= 1974 Anti-Ahmadiyya riots =

Riots targeting the Ahmadi community in Pakistan

- Part of Persecution of Ahmadis
- Date: 29 May 1974-October 1974
- Location: Pakistan
- Caused by: Attack on Students of Nishtar Medical University at Chenab Nagar railway station
- Goals: Declaring Ahmaddiya Muslims as Non-Muslim minority in the Constitution of Pakistan
- Methods: Demonstrations; Civil resistance; Self-immolation; Strike actions; Mutiny; Army defections
- Result: Second Amendment to the Constitution of Pakistan; Ordinance XX: Declaration of Ahmadiyya Muslims as Non-Muslims in Pakistan

Lead figures
Syed Ata Ullah Shah Bukhari; Mohammad Abdul Ghafoor Hazarvi; Zulfiqar Ali Bhutto; Shah Ahmad Noorani; Abul Ala Maududi; Abdul Sattar Khan Niazi; Agha Shorish Kashmiri; Syed Abuzar Bukhari; Syed Faiz-ul Hassan Shah; Janbaz Mirza; Muhammad Yusuf Ludhianvi	Mirza Nasir Ahmad; Mirza Tahir Ahmad; Maulana Dost Muhammad Shahid; Maulana Abul ‘Ata Jallundhari; Sheikh Muhammad Ahmad Mazhar; Maulana Dost Muhammad Shahid; Maulana Syed Muhammad Zakir Hussain Shah Sialvi

Casualties
- Deaths: 27 Ahmadi Muslims

From late May to early September 1974, altercations occurred between students of Islami Jamiat-e-Talaba and youths of the Ahmadiyya Muslim community at the Rabwah railway station. The incidents were marked by a series of events such as protests, violence, property damage, and government action against the Ahmadiyya community across Pakistan. These events reportedly resulted in casualties among Ahmadi individuals and damage to Ahmadi mosques. Furthermore, in response to these events, the government took actions, including constitutional amendments, related to the status of Ahmadis.

== Background ==
Prior to the riots and government actions members of the community held positions in various sectors, including the military, judiciary, and government in Pakistan. The Ahmadiyya community had been a vocal proponent of the Pakistan Movement and actively engaged with the All-India Muslim League, having strong relations with many prominent Muslim Leaguers and were opposed to the Congress-backed Jamaat-e-Islami and Majlis-e-Ahrar-ul-Islam. At the same time they formed a small minority (making up approximately 2%) of Pakistan's population, and revivalist Muslims and Muslim religious leaders in Pakistan were adamant that the sect be repressed and its members stripped of their status as Moslems.

The major religious controversy differences between the Ahmadiyya and mainstream Sunni and Shia Muslims is the Ahmadiyya's interpretations of Khatam an-Nabiyyin (seal of the prophethood). Orthodox Muslims consider Ahmadiyya's interpretations blasphemous. Sunni and Shia Muslims are awaiting the coming of the Mahdi and the Second Coming of Jesus and reject the claims of Mirza Ghulam Ahmad whom Ahmadis believe to be the Promised Messiah and Mahdi. The Ahmadiyya were a vocal proponent of the Pakistan Movement and was actively engaged with the Muslim League, having strong relations with many prominent Muslim Leaguers and were opposed by Jamaat-e-Islami and Majlis-e-Ahrar-ul-Islam.

== Timeline of events ==
During 1974, a group of anti-Ahmadis were aboard a train to Peshawar had stopped at the Rabwah railway station. The IJT students began to raise slogans against Ahmadiyya and cursed the community’s spiritual figurehead, Mirza Ghulam Ahmad. Some had exposed themselves to Ahmadi women, which had caused the Ahmadi men to retaliate and attack some of the students. The train then left the station taking the charged students to Peshawar.

However, when the incident was related to some Ahmadiyya leaders in Rabwah, they ordered Ahmadiyya youth to reach the station with hockey sticks and chains when the train stopped again at Rabwah on its way back from Peshawar. After finding out that the students would be returning to Multan from Peshawar on the 29th of May, dozens of young Ahmadi men gathered at the Rabwah railway station. As the train came to a halt, the men fell upon the bogeys carrying the IJT members. A fight ensued and 30 IJT men were severely beaten for insulting the religious sentiments of the Ahmadiyya. This incident triggered year-long country-wide attacks on Ahmadis leading to the loss of many lives and property.

On September 17, the Parliament of Pakistan unanimously passed an amendment to the constitution defining Ahmadis as 'non-Muslim'.

May 29 - Mr. Basheer Ahmad Tahir killed in Kundiaro district Nawabshah.

May 30 - 222 shops and 5 houses belonging to Ahmadis were ransacked in Chiniot. Ahmadiyya Mosques were damaged in Gojra, Shorkot and Rawalpindi.

May 31 - 26 Shops belonging to Ahmadis in Faisalabad, 7 shops in Bhera, 3 in Bahawalnagar, 7 in Rahim Yar Khan and 6 in Gujranwala were ransacked and burnt.

Jun 01 - Seven Ahmadis Mohammad Afzal Khokhar, Mohammad Ashraf Khokhar, Saeed Ahmad Khan, Manzoor Ahmad Khan, Mahmood Ahmad Khan, Sajjad Pervaiz and Ahmad Ali were killed in Gujranwala.

Jun 01 - Chaudhry Shaukat Hayat killed in Hafizabad.

Jun 02 - Six Ahmadis Basheer Ahmad, Muneer Ahmad, Mohammad Ramzan, Mohammad Iqbal, Inayatullah and Ghulam Qadir killed in Gujranwala.

Jun 02 - Ahmadiyya Mosque occupied by opponents in Lala Musa.

Jun 03 - Two Ahmadis killed in Gujranwala.

Jun 03 - 12 shops belonging to Ahmadis ransacked in Jhang.

Jun 04 - Mohammad Ilyas Arif killed in Wah Cantt.

Jun 04 - Ahmadiyya Library burnt to ashes in Mardan.

Jun 05 - Supply of milk was stopped for the residents of Rabwah.

Jun 05 - 12 Ahmadis were severally tortured in Islamabad. One Ahmadi's mouth was filled with cow dung.

Jun 05 - 3 Ahmadi Houses were robbed, and demolished in Tarnab, Charsadda

Jun 06 - Factories and Houses belonging to two Ahmadis were burnt in Sargodha.

Jun 07 - Opponents offered Friday Prayers in Ahmadiyya Mosque, Kohat after forcibly occupying it. House belonging to an Ahmadi ransacked in Haripur, Hazara.

Jun 08 - Naqab Shah Mehmund killed in Peshawar.

Jun 09 - Syed Moulood Ahmad killed in Quetta.

Jun 09 - Two Ahmadis Ghulam Sarwar and Israar Ahmad killed in Topi (Khyber Pakhtunkhwa). Israar Ahmad's dead body was sprayed with bullets and mutilated.

Jun 10 - 7 shops belonging to Ahmadis were ransacked and burnt in Mardan.

Jun 11 - Mohammad Fakhruddin Bhatti killed in Abbotabad. His corpse was also set on fire.

Jun 11 - Two Ahmadis (father and son) Mohammad Zaman Khan and Mubarak Ahmad killed in Balakot. Jun 12 - All Ahmadis were arrested in Dera Ismail Khan.

Jun 13 - Wheat crop and agricultural machinery of an Ahmadi's farm was looted in Shah Nagar.

Jun 14 - Shop of an Ahmadi was burnt to ashes in Mailsi.

Jun 15 - House belonging to President of Jamaat Ahmadiyya, Sadhoki Gujranwala, was set on fire.

Jun 17 - Crops belonging to Ahmadis were destroyed in Chak 39DB Sargodha.

Jun 18 - 12 Ahmadis were arrested in Pakpattan.

Jun 19 - Social Boycott of Ahmadis in Muridke.

Jun 20 - Ahmadiyya Mosque set on fire in Tulwandi, Khajoorwali.

Jun 21 - All Ahmadiyya population of Rahim Yar Khan confined to their homes.

Jun 22 - An Ahmadi's dead body was disinterred in Khushab.

Jun 24 - All Ahmadi shops in Sargodha were picketed.

Jun 29 - An Ahmadi father and son were tortured by Police in Chak 303GB, Toba Tek Singh.

Jul 01 - Faces of Ahmadis were blackened and they were forcibly moved through the streets of Bhera.

Jul 02 - Sethi Maqbool Ahmad killed in Jehlum.

Jul 05 - Ahmadiyya Mosque occupied by opponents in PakPattan.

Jul 07 - An Ahmadi's dead body was disinterred in Khushab.

Jul 12 - Ahmadi families in Bhera started starving due to severe boycott.

Jul 14 - Doors of Ahmadiyya houses in Meeruk district Sahiwal were barricaded.

Jul 14 - All Ahmadi men were arrested in district Sargodha.

Jul 16 - Ahmadiyya delegation who went to meet detainees of Sargodha were fired upon at Sargodha Railway Station.

Jul 18 - Flour Mills refused to grind the wheat for Ahmadis.

Jul 19 - Ahmadiyya Mosque attacked and occupied in Takht Hazara district Sargodha.

Jul 21 - Ahmadiyya Mosque attacked and occupied in Moghulpura, Lahore.

Jul 22 - Ahmadiyya Mosque attacked and occupied in Lala Musa.

Jul 23 - Supply of milk was denied to Ahmadis in Bahawalnagar.

Jul 24 - Shops of Ahmadis were forced to shut down in Sheikhupura.

Jul 26 - Ahmadiyya Mosque ransacked and destroyed in Uch Shareef, Bahawalpur. All record and valuable things were burnt to ashes.

Jul 27 - Shops belonging to two Ahmadis were burnt to ashes in Okara.

Jul 28 - Punjab Chief Minister refused to meet with Ahmadiyya delegation.

Jul 28 - Ahmadiyya Mosque demolished in Bhoyanwala, Gujrat.

Jul 29 - Ahmadiyya Mosque sealed in Samburial, Sialkot.

Jul 29 - Ahmadis forbidden to take water from public well in Dolian Juttan.

Jul 30 - All Ahmadi residents of Burewala were expelled.

Jul 30 - Water supply and sanitation facilities were refused to Ahmadi residents of Haroonabad, Bahawalnagar

Jul 31 - Shops of Ahmadis were forced to shut down in Duska.

Aug 01 - Severe social boycott of Ahmadis in Hafizabad. Purchased goods were forcibly taken back.

Aug 02 - An Ahmadi was tied to tree and severally beaten in Mundi Bahauddin.

Aug 04 - A barber's face was painted black for providing hair cut to Ahmadis.

Aug 06 - Three shops belonging to Ahmadis were set on fire.

Aug 09 - Ahmadis were barred to enter their Mosque in Gujranwala.

Aug 09 - In Gujranwala 14 Ahmadis were dismissed from their jobs only because of their faith.

Aug 13 - Ahmadiyya Mosque demolished in Da’ata district Hazara.

Aug 18 - Burial of an Ahmadi woman was not allowed in Campbellpur. Other old graves were also dug out.

Aug 18 - Mr. Mohammad Akbar, an Ahmadi, was tied up in a jungle for three days in Barali, Azad Kashmir.

Aug 24 - Stone pelting and destruction of Ahmadiyya Mosque in Kot Momin, Sargodha.

Aug 24 - Ahmadi students were beaten up in Multan. Aug 27 - An Ahmadi youngster, kidnapped from Gurmoola Virkan, Gujranwala, was released after 17 days of confinement. He lost his conscious due to severe torture.

Sep 02 - Professor Abbas bin Abdul Qadir was killed in Hyderabad.

Sep 03 - Stone pelting on Ahmadiyya houses in Chak 32 South, Sargodha.

The following members appeared before the Parliament of Pakistan. Mirza Nasir Ahmad, the Khalifatul Masih of the time Mirza Tahir Ahmad, 4th Khalifatul Masih Maulana Abul ‘Ata Jallundhari, a renowned scholar. Sheikh Muhammad Ahmad Mazhar, Former Amir, Jama‘at Ahmadiyya, District Faisalabad Maulana Dost Muhammad Shahid, Historian of the community. Under pressure from Islamists, Zulfiqar Ali Bhutto and other members declared Ahmadis to be non-Muslims.

Oct 05 - Despite the presence of Punjab Chief Minister in the city, opponents played havoc with lives and property of Ahmadis in Sargodha. Ahmadiyya Mosque was demolished. Some 38 houses and shops belonging to Ahmadis were set on fire after looting valuables. Five Ahmadis sustained severe injuries.

Oct 07 - Mr. Basharat Ahmad killed in Tahal district Gujrat.

All meetings & conventions of auxiliary Ahmadiyya organisations were cancelled for not getting permission from Government.
