= 1953 Lahore riots =

Series of riots against the Ahmadis

Lahore riots of 1953
- Part of the persecution of Ahmadis in Pakistan
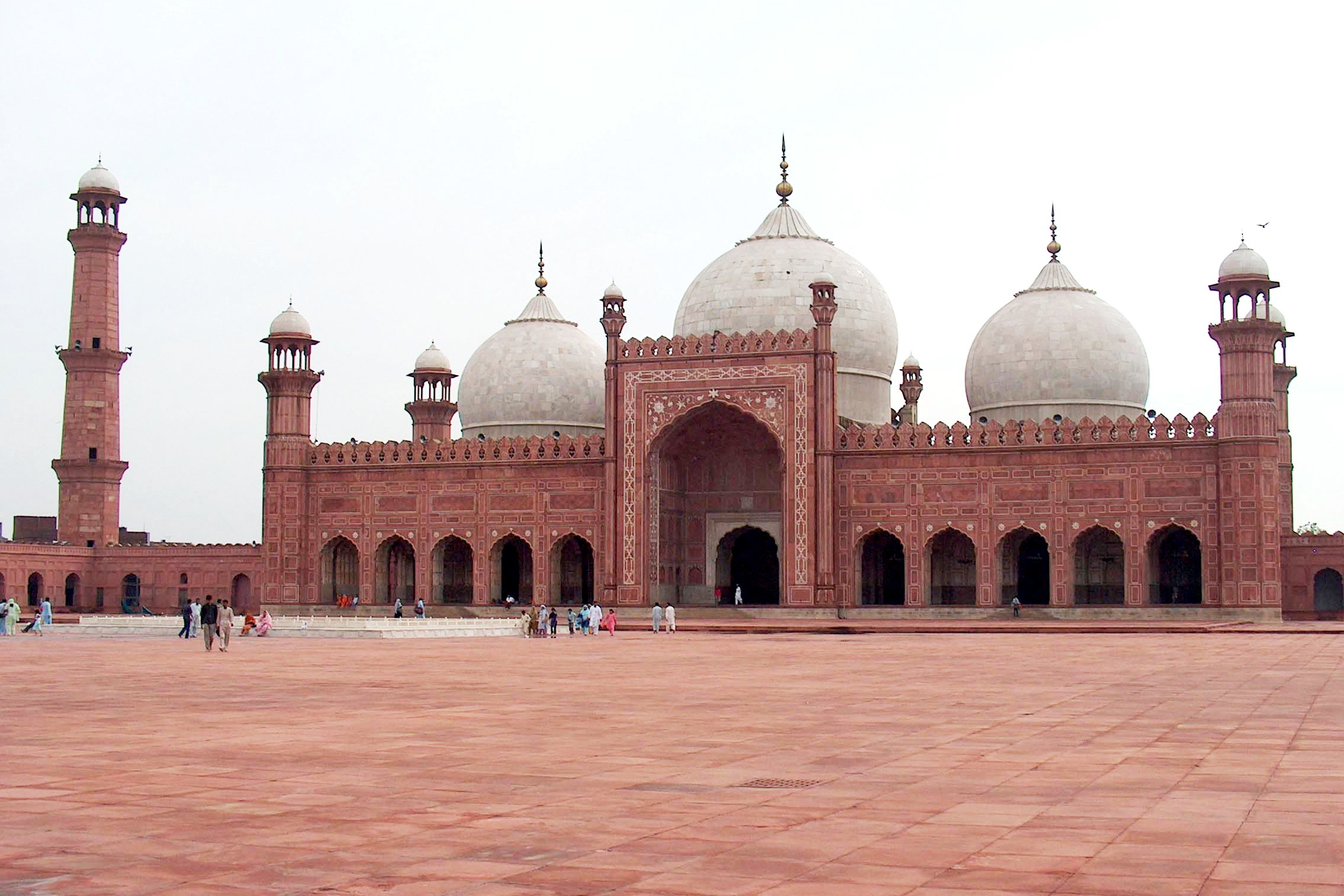
- Badshahi Mosque, Lahore
- Date: 1 February 1953 – 14 May 1953
- Location: Lahore, Pakistan
- Goals: Removal of Muhammad Zafarullah Khan (an Ahmadi) as Foreign Minister; Removal of Ahmadis from top government offices; Declaration of Ahmadis as non-Muslims.
- Result: See Aftermath section: Military suppression of the riots; Mass anti-Ahmadi violence ended; Lifting of martial law over Lahore; Dismissal of Khawaja Nazimuddin's government by Malik Ghulam Muhammad; None of the demands accepted

Parties
| Pakistan Army; Punjab Police | Majlis-e-Ahrar-e-Islam; Majlis-e-Tahaffuz-e-Khatme Nabuwwat; Jamaat-e-Islami Pakistan; Jamiat Ulema-e-Pakistan |

Lead figures
| Major General Azam Khan; Civil Service Chief Secretary Hafiz Abdul Majid (as Azam Khan's deputy); Brigadier Haq Nawaz; Brigadier F.R. Kallue; Captain Rahimuddin Khan; Deputy Superintendent Syed Firdous Shah † | Syed Ata Ullah Shah Bukhari; Mohammad Abdul Ghafoor Hazarvi; Syed Faiz-ul Hassan Shah; Syed Abuzar Bukhari; Maulana Mazhar Ali Azhar; Master Taj-ud-Din Ansari; Abul Ala Maududi; Abdul Sattar Khan Niazi; Chaudhry Muhammad Akbar Sialkoti; Mian Tufail Mohammad |

Casualties and losses
| 2 soldiers killed, 4 injured 1 police officer killed | 11 killed 49 wounded |
- Between 200 and 2,000 Ahmadis killed

The 1953 Lahore riots were a series of violent riots against the Ahmadiyya movement, a faith marginalized in Pakistan, mainly in the city of Lahore, as well as the rest of Punjab, which were eventually quelled by the Pakistan Army which declared two months of martial law. The demonstrations began in February 1953, soon escalating into citywide incidents, including looting, arson and the murder of somewhere between 200 and 2,000 people. Thousands more were left displaced. According to the official inquiry conducted by the Punjab Government, the actual number killed in these riots was around 20. The first page of the inquiry says that before the declaration of martial law, the police killed two people on the night of 4 March and ten the 5th. 66 people were admitted to Lahore hospitals with gunshot wounds. The military attempting to quell the disturbances in Lahore admitted to killing 11 and wounding 49. There were additional casualties in other towns. Seeing that police were unable to contain the increasingly widespread unrest, Governor-General Malik Ghulam Muhammad handed over the administration of the city to the army under Major General Azam Khan, imposing martial law on 6 March.

== Background ==
One of the major controversial differences between Ahmadis and mainstream Muslims is their different interpretations of Khatam an-Nabiyyin. Mainstream Muslims are awaiting the coming of the Mahdi and the Second Coming of Jesus and reject the claims of Mirza Ghulam Ahmad whom Ahmadis believe to be the Promised Messiah and Mahdi. The Ahmadiyya Community was a vocal proponent of the Pakistan Movement and were actively engaged with the Muslim league having strong relations with many prominent Muslim Leaguers and were opposed to the Congress backed Majlis-e-Ahrar-ul-Islam. After the independence of Pakistan in 1947, Ahmadis prospered and reached many high ranking Government and Military positions in Pakistan, due to an extremely high literacy rate. They held up stay as an important political force in Pakistan, due to its support for secularism and acted as a counterbalance to Majlis-e-Ahrar-ul-Islam. This group was disillusioned and disorganized after 1947 and politically isolated. Even before partition one of its primary targets was the Ahmadiyya movement. However, in 1949, the Majlis-e-Ahrar launched countrywide campaigns and protests resulting in a ban on Majlis-e-Ahrar in 1954.

== Demands and culmination ==
Disturbances began after an ultimatum was delivered to the Prime Minister of Pakistan on 21 January 1953 by a deputation of ulama representing Majlis-i Amal (Note: council of action) constituted by an All-Pakistan Muslim Parties Convention held in Karachi from 16 to 18 January 1953. The ultimatum stated unless three demands were met:

- Removal of Zafarullah Khan from the foreign ministry;
- Removal of Ahmadis from top government offices;
- Declaration of Ahmadis as non-Muslims.

... Majlis-e-Amal would resort to direct action (rast iqdum).

== Disturbances and aftermath ==
The ultimatum was rejected and disturbances commenced.

On 6 March martial law was declared. Two people were killed by police prior to martial law and casualties "admitted by the military" caused in "quelling the disturbances in Lahore" were eleven killed and 49 wounded.

Marking the military's first foray into civilian politics, the 70-day-long military deployment saw Lahore return to normalcy under Azam Khan's coherent leadership; the Secretary General of the Awami Muslim League, Maulana Abdul Sattar Khan Niazi, was arrested and sentenced to death, but his sentence was subsequently commuted. The riots also brought unprecedented political consequences; Ghulam Muhammad first dismissed Mian Mumtaz Daultana from the post of Chief Minister of Punjab on 24 March, allegedly for manipulating the religious element in anti-Ahmadi violence for political benefits. Next on 17 April, using his special powers under the Government of India Act 1935, Ghulam Muhammad dismissed Prime Minister Khwaja Nazimuddin and the entire federal cabinet. Pakistan's ambassador to the United States, Muhammad Ali Bogra replaced him. Bogra, who did not know why he was being called back, took the oath as new Prime Minister within hours of Nazimuddin's dismissal.

In March 1953, several instigators of the riots, including, Abul Ala Maududi, Mawlana Amin Hussain Islahi, Malik Nasrullah Khan Azeez, Syed Naqiullah, Chaudhry Muhammad Akbar Sialkoti and Mian Tufail Mohammad were arrested and sent to the Central Jail Lahore.

On 19 June 1953 a Court Of Inquiry was established to look into disturbances, known as the Punjab Disturbances Court Of Inquiry. The inquiry commenced on 1 July and held 117 sittings. The evidence was concluded on 23 January 1954 and arguments in the case lasted to 28 February 1954. Conclusions were formulated and the report issued 10 April 1954.

== Timeline ==
- January - After the convention of the All Pakistan Muslim League at Dhaka, anti-Ahmadiyya elements threatened to take direct action after 22 February 1953, if their demands were not met.
- 1 February - Burial of an Ahmadi was resisted by anti-Ahmadiyya crowds in Sargodha.
- 23 February - Anti-Ahmadiyya riots broke out in West Pakistan mainly in the Punjab Province.
- 27 February - Alfazal, a publication of the Ahmadiyya community, published from Lahore, was banned by the Government for one year. The vacuum was filled by the publication of Farooq. The first issue of Farooq was published on 4 March but after the second issue, it was forced to stop publication on 11 March.
- 4-5 March - Order of arrest passed for Abdul Sattar Khan Niazi for his highly inflammatory speech given at the Wazir Khan Mosque. Arrest not carried out, as the mosque was surrounded by agitators and protestors.

Violent riots break out, shops and factories forcibly closed by mobs; post offices and government buildings set on fire; shops and homes looted by the mob; Master Manzoor Ahmed, a teacher, is killed in Baghbanpura, Lahore.

- 6 March - Ahmadiyya Noor Mosque in Rawalpindi is attacked and set on fire by a mob. Many shops and houses belonging to Ahmadis and the President of Jamaat Ahmadiyya, Rawalpindi were ransacked. Countrywide riots including torture, murder attempts and arson started against the Ahmadiyya especially in Lahore.
  - Pakistan's first Martial law declared in Lahore at 1:30 PM by Major General Azam Khan. Curfew imposed, cinemas and other entertainment hubs closed. Over the following nine weeks, the army takes control of the city and their efforts include improvements in sanitation, action against hoarding and black marketeering, and stricter enforcement of traffic laws.
- 8 March - Havaldar Abdul Ghafoor and another Ahmadi perfumer were killed in Lahore.
- 10 March - 600 people were arrested in a mosque area
- 12 March - Additional Magistrate Jhang prohibited the Supreme Head of the Ahmadiyya Community from commenting on anti-Ahmadiyya riots and the anti-Ahmadiyya movement.
- 14 March - 13 people, including two Pakistan Army soldiers are killed and 53, including four soldiers, are injured during the riots.
- 1 Apr - Mirza Shareef Ahmad and Mirza Nasir Ahmad were arrested in Lahore during the riots. They were released on 28 May.
  - Superintendent of Police Jhang searched Qasre Khilafat and the central offices of Sadar Anjuman Ahmadiyya, Rabwah.
  - Nazir Tableegh was arrested.
- 7 May - Martial law authorities sentence Abdul Sattar Khan Niazi to death.
- 11 May - Martial law authorities sentence Abul A'la Maududi to death for provoking civil unrest by writing Qadyani Masla, and certain press statements delivered in February and March.
- 13 May - The death sentences of Niazi and Maududi were changed to life sentences.
- 14 May - Martial law was lifted.
- 16 May - Dawn writes: "Memories of the Army rule in Lahore will linger for a long time to come, and the new look the city has acquired and the sense of discipline among its people inculcated by the army will bear eloquent testimony to the good work done by Maj Gen Azam Khan and his men."
