= Takfiri =

Term describing Muslims who engage in excommunication

Takfiri (Note: Arabic: تَكْفِيرِيّ, romanized: takfīriyy, lit. 'excommunicational') is an Arabic and Islamic term denoting a Muslim who excommunicates one of their coreligionists—i.e., who accuses another Muslim of being an apostate, or murtadd, 'one who turns back'.

According to the traditional interpretations of Islamic law (Sharia), the punishment for apostasy is death. Potentially a cause of strife and violence within the Muslim community (ummah), an ill-founded accusation of takfir is considered a major forbidden act (haram) in Islamic jurisprudence. Takfirism has been called a "minority ideology" that "advocates the killing of other Muslims declared to be unbelievers."

The accusation itself, takfīr, is derived from the Arabic word kafir ('unbeliever') and described as when "one who is a Muslim is declared impure". In principle, in mainstream Sunni Islam, the only group authorized to declare another Muslim a kāfir are the scholars of Islam (ulama); this is done only if all the prescribed legal precautions have been taken. Traditionally, the declaration of takfīr was used against self-professed Muslims who denied one or more of the five pillars of Islam. Throughout the history of Islam, Islamic denominations and movements, such as Shia Islam and Ahmadiyya Islam, have been accused of takfīr and labeled as kuffār ('unbelievers') by Sunni leaders, becoming victims of religious discrimination, religious violence, and religious persecution. The term Takfiri has also been pejoratively deployed by Shia jihadist groups to demonise and justify violence against Sunnis.

In the history of Islam, a sect originating in the 7th century CE known as the Kharijites carried out takfīr against both Sunnī and Shīʿa Muslims, becoming a dominant source of intra-Islamic insurrection against caliphates for centuries. Since the latter half of the 20th century, takfīr has also been used for "sanctioning violence against leaders of Islamic states" who do not enforce Sharia or are otherwise "deemed insufficiently religious". This arbitrary application of takfīr has become a "central ideology" of insurgent Wahhabi-Salafi jihadist extremist and terrorist groups, particularly al-Qaeda and Islamic State of Iraq and the Levant (ISIL), which have drawn on the ideas of the medieval Islamic scholars Ibn Taymiyyah and Ibn Kathir, and those of the modern Islamist ideologues Sayyid Qutb and Abul A'la Maududi. The practice of takfīr has been denounced as deviant by mainstream branches of Islam and Muslim scholars, such as Hasan al-Hudaybi (died 1977) and Yusuf al-Qaradawi.

== Issues and criticisms ==
Traditionally, Muslims have agreed that someone born a Muslim or converting to Islam who rejects the faith is deserving of capital punishment, provided legal precautions have been taken (the accused being educated in their error, given a chance to repent, evaluated for mental soundness, etc.). This is true in the case of a self-professed apostates, or "extreme, persistent and aggressive" proponents of religious innovation (bidʻah).

Generally, Muslims agree that the declaration of takfīr is "so serious, and mistakes therein are so grave", that great care is needed. There is also a belief shared by various Muslim scholars which assert that the practice of takfīr may be dangerous for the entire Muslim community (ummah); they believe that if takfīr is "used wrongly or unrestrainedly", retaliation could lead down a slippery slope of "discord and sedition" to mutual excommunication and "complete disaster". The Sunnī Islamist militant group and Salafi-jihadist terrorist organization ISIL (a.k.a. ISIS; IS; Daesh), for example, have declared takfīr not only upon Shīʿa Muslims and Sufi Muslims but also against rival insurgent Islamist groups (although they are also Salafi-Jihadists) and all those who oppose its policy of enslaving and killing Shīʿa Muslims and non-Muslim religious minorities, particularly Christians and Yazidis.

What to do in a situation where self-professed Muslim(s) disagree with other Muslims on an important doctrinal point is more controversial. In the case of the Ahmadiyya Muslim community—who are accused of denying the basic tenet of the Finality of Prophethood—the Islamic Republic of Pakistan declares in Ordinance XX of the Second Amendment to its Constitution, that Ahmadi Muslims are non-Muslims and deprives them of religious rights. All religious seminaries and madrasas in Pakistan belonging to different sects of Islam have prescribed essential reading materials specifically targeted at refuting Ahmadiyya beliefs. Throughout the 20th and 21st centuries, the political and religious persecution of Ahmadi Muslims in Pakistan has sparked several large riots (the 1953 Lahore riots and the 1974 Anti-Ahmadiyya riots) and bombings (the 2010 Ahmadiyya mosques massacre) which have targeted and killed hundreds of Ahmadi Muslims in the country.

== Modern political uses ==
The importance of takfir in modern Islamic political thought, insurgent Islamist groups, and religiously-motivated terrorist attacks on civilians is underscored by the fact that as of 2017 (according to Anthony Cordesman and the Center for Strategic and International Studies [CSIS]), "the overwhelming majority" of violent terrorist attacks had occurred in Muslim-majority countries and the "primary victims" of these attacks were Muslims.

Studying the largest Arab country, Egypt, Elie Podeh distinguishes between three groups: conservative Islamists, "jihadi" Muslims, and takfiri. All three see the government and society sadly lacking in piety and in need of Islamification and restoration of Sharia law. Conservative Islamists do not support armed struggle against the secular government, whereas jihadist and takfiri groups do, and invoke the concepts of jahiliyya (regression of Muslims to pre-Islamic ignorance), al-hakimiyya (God's sovereignty), and al-takfir. However, according to Podeh's formulation, takfiri groups are more extreme, and regard not just some Muslims but the whole of Egyptian society as kafir, and consequently completely disengage from it. Podeh also points out that unlike jihadists, takfiri groups make no distinction between the regime and the ordinary population when employing violence.

Some political scientists and scholars of Middle Eastern studies (such as Jacob Zenna, Zacharias Pier, and Dale Eikmeier) argue that the accusation of takfir may serve as a sort of ingenious "legal loophole" for Islamist insurgents, allowing them to bypass the Sharia injunction against imprisoning or killing fellow Muslims. Since it is very difficult to overthrow governments without killing their (self-proclaimed) Muslim rulers and officials or any Muslim opposing the Islamists, and since enforcing Sharia is the insurgents raison d'être, the prohibition against killing Muslims is a major impediment against taking power. But if the enemy can be made to be not Muslims but unbelievers claiming to be Muslims, the prohibition is turned into a religious obligation.

Takfiris have also been classified by some scholars as violent offshoots of the Salafi movement. Although most Salafis oppose terrorism or violence within the Muslim community (ummah), Takfiris condone acts of violence as legitimate methods of achieving religious or political goals. Middle East expert Robert Baer has written that:

... takfiri generally refers to a Wahabi Salafi who looks at the world in black-and-white; there are true believers and then there are nonbelievers, with no shades in between. A takfiri's mission is to re-create the Caliphate according to a literal interpretation of the Qur'an.

Takfiris also reject the traditional Muslim duty to obey one's legitimate rulers in all manners that do not contradict the Sharia, as sedition is viewed as a great danger to a nation. However, takfiris consider all political authority that does not abide by their interpretation of Islam to be illegitimate and therefore apostate; this view closely mirrors Qutb's views on what he perceived as jahiliyyah in the Muslim world. As such, violence against such regimes is considered legitimate.

The term takfiri was brought to greater public prominence by the BBC investigative journalist Peter Taylor in his 2005 BBC Television series The New Al Qaeda.

=== Suicide ===
Takfiri views on suicide also differ significantly from those of orthodox Muslims. In mainstream Islam, suicide is considered a major sin, but Takfiris believe that one who deliberately kills himself whilst attempting to kill a religious enemy is a martyr (shahid) and therefore goes straight to Jannah (paradise) without having to wait for the Day of Judgement. According to this doctrine, all sins of the martyrs are absolved when they die in martyrdom, allowing carte blanche for the indiscriminate killing of civilians and non-combatants.

== Historical background ==
In the "early times" of Islam, "charges of apostasy" were also "not unusual, and ... the terms 'unbeliever' and 'apostate' were commonly used in religious polemic" in hopes of silencing the deviant and prodding the lax back to the straight path. Classical manuals of jurisprudence in Islam sometimes provided fairly detailed lists of practices and beliefs that would render a Muslim an apostate that went far beyond infractions of the basic tenets of Islam. For example, Madjma' al-Anhur by Hanafi scholar Shaykhzadeh (d.1667 CE), declared such misdeeds as "to assert the createdness of the Quran, to translate the Quran, ... to pay respect to non-Muslims, to celebrate Nowruz the Iranian New Year", would make a Muslim an unbeliever. Nonetheless, those accused of apostasy were usually left "unmolested", and in general executions for apostasy were "rare in Islamic history", unless the violation was "extreme, persistent and aggressive".

According to researcher Trevor Stanley, the precedent "for the declaration of takfir against a leader" came from the medieval Islamic scholar Taqi al-Din ibn Taymiyyah (1263–1328 CE), who supported the Mamluks in their jihad against the invading Central Asian Mongols. After the Mongols converted to Islam, another cause was sought for the jihad against them. In his famous fatwa, Ibn Taymiyyah reasoned that since the Mongols followed their traditional Yassa law rather than Sharia (Islamic law), they were not really Muslims, and since non-Muslims who called themselves Muslims were apostates, the Mongols should be killed. Ibn Taymiyya wrote that he "was among the strictest of people in forbidding that a specific person be accuse of unbelief, immorality or sin until proof from the Messenger [to this effect] has been established", yet he "regularly accused his opponents of outright unbelief and has become a source of inspiration to many Islamist and even takfiri movements."

From the 19th century onwards, liberal, modernist, or reformist Muslims have complained that this capital punishment is a violation of the principle of no compulsion in religion, and only those guilty of treason should be executed. Revivalist and conservative Muslims see the capital punishment as a matter of obedience to the Islamic law (sharīʿa) and protection of the faith. Since the 20th century, capital punishment is seldom applied by the state in Muslim-majority countries; instead, it is frequently carried out by "vigilantes" who believe that they are executing their "individual duty".

=== Kharijites ===
Islamic extremism dates back to the early history of Islam with the emergence of the Kharijites in the 7th century CE. The original schism between Kharijites, Sunnis, and Shiʿas among Muslims was disputed over the political and religious succession to the guidance of the Muslim community (ummah) after the death of the Islamic prophet Muhammad. From their essentially political position, the Kharijites developed extreme doctrines that set them apart from both mainstream Sunni and Shiʿa Muslims. Shiʿas believe Ali ibn Abi Talib is the true successor to Muhammad, while Sunnis consider Abu Bakr to hold that position. The Kharijites broke away from both the Shiʿas and the Sunnis during the First Fitna (the first Islamic Civil War); they were particularly noted for adopting a radical approach to takfīr (excommunication), whereby they declared both Sunni and Shiʿa Muslims to be either infidels (kuffār) or false Muslims (munāfiḳūn), and therefore deemed them worthy of death for their perceived apostasy.

The Islamic tradition traces the origin of the Kharijities to the battle between 'Ali and Mu'awiya at Siffin in 657 CE. When 'Ali was faced with a military stalemate and agreed to submit the dispute to arbitration, some of his party withdrew their support from him. "Judgement belongs to God alone" (لاَ حُكْم إلَا لِلّهِ) became the slogan of these secessionists. They also called themselves al-Shurāt ('the Vendors'), to reflect their willingness to sell their lives in martyrdom.

These original Kharijites opposed both 'Ali and Mu'awiya, and appointed their own leaders. They were decisively defeated by 'Ali, who was in turn assassinated by a Kharijite. Kharijites engaged in guerilla warfare against the Umayyads, but only became a movement to be reckoned with during the Second Fitna (the second Islamic Civil War) when they at one point controlled more territory than any of their rivals. The Kharijites were, in fact, one of the major threats to Ibn al-Zubayr's bid for the caliphate; during this time they controlled Yamama and most of southern Arabia, and captured the oasis town of al-Ta'if.

The Azariqa, considered to be the extreme faction of the Kharijites, controlled parts of western Iran under the Umayyads until they were finally put down in 699 CE. The more moderate Ibadi Kharijites were longer-lived, continuing to wield political power in North and East Africa and in eastern Arabia during the 'Abbasid period. Because of their readiness to declare any opponent as apostate, the extreme Kharijites tended to fragment into small groups. One of the few points that the various Kharijite splinter groups held in common was their view of the caliphate, which differed from other Muslim theories on two points.

- First, they were principled egalitarians, holding that any pious Muslim ("even an Ethiopian slave") can become Caliph and that family or tribal affiliation is inconsequential. The only requirements for leadership are piety and acceptance by the community.
- Second, they agreed that it is the duty of the believers to depose any leader who falls into error. This second principle had profound implications for Kharijite theology. Applying these ideas to the early history of the caliphate, Kharijites only accept Abu Bakr and 'Umar as legitimate caliphs. Of 'Uthman's caliphate they recognize only the first six years as legitimate, and they reject 'Ali altogether.

By the time that Ibn al-Muqaffa' wrote his political treatise early in the 'Abbasid period, the Kharijites were no longer a significant political threat, at least in the Islamic heartlands. The memory of the menace they had posed to Muslim unity and of the moral challenge generated by their pious idealism still weighed heavily on Muslim political and religious thought, however. Even if the Kharijites could no longer threaten, their ghosts still had to be answered. The Ibadis are the only Kharijite group to survive into modern times.

=== Colonial era and after ===
In the colonial and post-colonial Muslim world the influence and pressure of Western powers meant that not only was apostasy rare in practice, but that it was (contrary to Sharia) abolished as a crime punishable by death in state statutes of law (the West also encouraged establishing laws giving equal rights to women and non-Muslims in violation of Sharia). Some Muslims (such as the cleric 'Adb al-Qadir 'Awdah) responded by preaching that if the state would not kill apostates then it had "become a duty of individual Moslems" to do so, and gave advice on how to plead in court to avoid punishment after being arrested for such a murder.

==== Sayyid Qutb ====
Sayyid Qutb could be said to have founded the actual movement of radical Islam. Unlike the other Islamic thinkers that have been mentioned above, Qutb was not an apologist. He was a prominent leader of the Muslim Brotherhood and a highly influential Islamist ideologue, and the first to articulate these anathemizing principles in his magnum opus Fī ẓilāl al-Qurʾān (In the shade of the Qurʾān) and his 1966 manifesto Maʿālim fīl-ṭarīq (Milestones), which lead to his execution by the Egyptian government. Other Salafi movements in the Middle East and North Africa and across the Muslim world adopted many of his Islamist principles. According to Qutb, the Muslim community has been extinct for several centuries and reverted to jahiliyah (the pre-Islamic age of ignorance) because those who call themselves Muslims have failed to follow the Sharia law. In order to restore Islam, bring back its days of glory, and free the Muslims from the clasps of ignorance, Qutb proposed the shunning of modern society, establishing a vanguard modeled after the early Muslims, preaching, and bracing oneself for poverty or even death as preparation for jihad against what he perceived as jahili government and society, and overthrow them. Qutbism, the radical Islamist ideology derived from the ideas of Qutb, was denounced by many prominent Muslim scholars as well as other members of the Muslim Brotherhood, like Yusuf al-Qaradawi.

== Late 20th and early 21st century ==
=== Qutb and insurgents ===
By the mid 1990s, one list of Qutb-inspired groups included al-Jihaad al-Islami, Takfir wal-Hijra, Jund Allah, al-Jihaad, Tanzim al-Faniyyah al-Askariyyah. (Note: Al-Jihaad al-Islami; Jama'a al Jihaad; and al-Takfir wa al-Hijrah were Egyptian terrorist groups. There was a Jund Allah in Egypt and in Lebanon.)

While Qutb declared that the Islamic world had "long ago vanished from existence" and that true Muslims would have to confront "arrogant, mischievous, criminal and degraded people" in the struggle to restore Islam, he had not specifically stated that the self-professed Muslim "authorities of the jahili system" were apostates (or whether they should all be killed).

Ayman al-Zawahiri, "jihad's main ideologist," (originally of al-Jihaad al-Islami aka Egyptian Islamic Jihad), and the leader of al-Qaeda from 2011 until his death in 2022, paid homage to Qutb in his book Knights under the Prophet's Banner (2001). Al Qaeda is commonly described as seeking to overthrow the "apostate" regimes in the Middle East and replace them with "true" Islamic governments, and having a "habit" of denouncing Muslims who did not "accept a narrow interpretation" of Sunni Islam as "non-believers and legitimate targets".

Shukri Mustaf, founder of Jama'at al-Muslimin (known to the public as Takfir wal-Hijra) had been in prison with Qutb and was a disciple of his.

The Takfir of Islamic State may be more rooted in Wahhabism and Ibn Abd al-Wahhab than Qutb, but "one famous quote" from him "has been seen written on walls and has also appeared repeatedly in IS texts: 'Whoever does not pay the price of jihad, shall pay the price of abstention'". Iranian Shia researcher Jamileh Kadivar writes that the "roots" of ISIL's "takfiri" ideology "can be found in the Khawarij's view, and in the writings of Ibn Taymiyyah, Ibn Abd al-Wahhab, and Sayyid Qutb."

=== Egypt ===
In Qutb's home country of Egypt in the 1980s and 1990s many authorities of "the jahili system" were attacked and killed (along with non-Muslims such as tourists and Christians) by extremists.

In 1974, 100 members of the "Islamic Liberation Organization", led by one Salih Sirriya, stormed the armory of the Military Technical College in Cairo, seizing weapons and vehicles, as part of a plan to kill President Anwar El Sadat and other top Egyptian officials.

In 1977, the group Jama'at al-Muslimin (known to the public as Takfir wal-Hijra for its strategy of takfiring Muslim society and going into psychological hijra – exile from it), kidnapped and later killed an Islamic scholar and former Egyptian government minister Muhammad al-Dhahabi. The group's founder, Shukri Mustaf – who had been imprisoned with Sayyid Qutb, and was now one of Qutb's "most radical" disciples – believed that not only were the Egyptian President and his government officials apostates, but so was "Egyptian society as a whole" because it was "not fighting the Egyptian government and had thus accepted rule by non-Muslims". Hundreds of members of the group were arrested and Shukri Mustafa was executed but (according to journalist Robin Wright), the group reorganized with thousands of members. Later its ex-members went on to help assassinate Anwar Sadat, and be involved in the Algerian Civil War and Al-Qaeda.

In 1981, President Sadat was successfully assassinated (along with six diplomats) by members of the Tanzim al-Jihad movement.

During the 1990s, a violent Islamic insurgency in Egypt, primarily perpetrated by Al-Gama'a al-Islamiyya, targeted police, government officials (but also civilians including tourists). In one particularly bloody year (1993), 1106 persons were killed or wounded, and "several senior police officials and their bodyguards were shot dead in daylight ambushes."

=== Algerian Civil War ===
But in addition to the authorities of the jahili system, civilians also were targeted. Unlike the scholars of classical Islam, extremists not only expanded the definition of what constituted an apostate, but enforced its penalty. Along with other traditional socio-economic-ethnic-military-personality factors of insurgency, takfir played a part in the bloodshed of extremist violence.

In the brutal 1991–2002 Algerian Civil War between the Algerian Government and various Islamist rebel groups, takfir was known to be declared by the hardline Islamist GIA (Armed Islamic Group of Algeria). Starting in April 1998, a series of massacres in villages or neighborhoods killed tens, and sometimes hundreds, of civilians without disregard to the age and sex of victims. Although the government had infiltrated the insurgents and it is thought by many that security forces as well as Islamists were involved in massacres, the GIA amir, Antar Zouabri claimed credit for two massacres (Rais and Bentalha massacres), calling the killings an "offering to God" and declaring impious the victims and all Algerians who had not joined its ranks. He declared that "except for those who are with us, all others are apostates and deserving of death". Between 100,000 and 200,000 were ultimately killed in the war.

=== Afghanistan ===
In August 1998 the Taliban insurgents slaughtered 8000 mostly Shia Hazara non-combatants in Mazar-i-Sharif, Afghanistan. The Taliban indicated revenge, or ethnic hatred, may have been a motivation for the slaughter, but comments by Mullah Niazi, the Taliban commander of the attack and newly installed governor, also indicated that takfir may also have been a motive. Niazi declared in a number of post-slaughter speeches from Mosques in Mazar-i-Sharif: "Hazaras are not Muslim, they are Shi’a. They are kofr [infidels]. The Hazaras killed our force here, and now we have to kill Hazaras. ... You either accept to be Muslims or leave Afghanistan. ...".

Ironically, the Taliban seemed to have backed off the "Hazaras are not Muslim" approach and were later denounced by the ISIS for their tolerance of Shia. The 13th issue of the ISIS magazine Dabiq (19 January 2016) attacked the Taliban for "considering the Rāfidah [a slur for Shia] to be their brothers and publicly denouncing those who target the Rāfidah:" Dabiq quoted "Abdullāh al-Wazīr, the official correspondent of the nationalist Taliban media committee:

The Shī’ah are Muslims ... Everyone who says there is no god but Allah and Muhammad is Allah's Messenger is a Muslim. The sects are many and Allah will decide between them on Judgment Day.

as evidence of Taliban wrongdoing.

=== Al Qaeda ===
Al Qaeda shared some of the takfir beliefs of ISIS, with, for example senior leader Ayman al-Zawahiri denigrating Shi’a as "a religious school based on excess and falsehood", but al-Zawahiri (and Abu Muhammad al-Maqdisi) also opposed attacks on Shia as a distraction from the more important goal of defeating the "far enemy", the United States. Attacks "on ordinary Shi’a, their mosques, and the mausoleum of their Imams" would "lift the burden from the Americans by diverting the mujahedeen to the Shi’a". What did provoke it to takfir and "legitimize targeting" was the fighting by Muslim soldiers as the allies of the West against Muslims.

=== War in Iraq (2013–2017) and aftermath ===
From its inception in 2013 to 2021, directly or through affiliated groups, ISIS (also Daesh or Islamic State of Iraq and the Levant), "has been responsible for 27,947 terrorist deaths". (Note: Reported by Jamileh Kadivar, citing: Global Terrorism Index 2019. The Institute for Economics and Peace (IEP). 2019.) The majority of these have been Muslims (Note: According to Jamileh Kadivar, who cites the following in support: Global Terrorism Database (GTD). National Consortium for the Study of Terrorism and Responses to Terrorism. 2020.; Herrera, Jack (18 March 2019). "Most Terrorist Victims Are Muslim". Pacific Standard.; Human Rights Office of the UNHCHR; UNAMI Human Rights Office (2014). Report on the protection of civilians in armed conflict in Iraq: 6 July – 10 September 2014 (PDF) (Report). United Nations High Commissioner for Human Rights; United Nations Assistance Mission for Iraq. Archived (PDF) from the original on 9 April 2025.; Ibrahim, Raymond (27 November 2017). "Why Does ISIS Kill Muslims?". Middle East Forum. (First published under the title "The Jihad on Sufism" in Front Page Magazine).; Obeidallah, Dean (7 October 2014). "ISIS's Gruesome Muslim Death Toll". The Daily Beast.; Obeidallah, Dean (16 November 2015). "Muslims Hate ISIS Most of All". The Daily Beast.) "because it has regarded them as kafir".

==== Anti-Shia ====
Abu Musab al-Zarqawi, who founded Jama'at al-Tawhid wal-Jihad in Iraq in 1999, is said to have turned "an insurgency against US troops" in Iraq "into a Shia–Sunni civil war". He saw himself as fighting not just the occupying United States military, but what he called "the sects of apostasy" (i.e. Shia Muslims). In September 2005 he declared "all-out war" on Shi'ites in Iraq after the Iraqi government offensive on insurgents in the Sunni town of Tal Afar.

The 13th issue of the ISIS magazine Dabiq dedicates "dozens of pages" were devoted "to attacking and explaining the necessity of killing Shia", who the group refers to by the label Rafidah.

Initiated by a sly Jew, [the Shia] are an apostate sect drowning in worship of the dead, cursing the best companions and wives of the Prophet, spreading doubt on the very basis of the religion (the Qur’ān and the Sunnah), defaming the very honor of the Prophet, and preferring their "twelve" imāms to the prophets and even to Allah! ...Thus, the Rāfidah are mushrik [polytheist] apostates who must be killed wherever they are to be found, until no Rāfidī walks on the face of earth, even if the jihād claimants despise such...

==== Broader takfir ====
In addition to takfiring Shia, from about 2003 to 2006 al-Zarqawi expanded "the range of behavior" that could make large number of self-proclaimed Muslims apostates: including "in certain cases, selling alcohol or drugs, wearing Western clothes or shaving one's beard, voting in an election—even for a Muslim candidate—and being lax about calling other people apostates".

Al-Zarqawi was killed in 2006 the successor of the Jama'at al-Tawhid wal-Jihad—the Islamic State of Iraq and the Levant, aka ISIL or Daesh, expanded takfir still further. ISIL not only called for the revival of slavery of non-Muslims (specifically of the Yazidi minority group), but takfired any Muslim who disagreed with their policy.

Yazidi women and children [are to be] divided according to the Shariah amongst the fighters of the Islamic State who participated in the Sinjar operations... Enslaving the families of the kuffar and taking their women as concubines is a firmly established aspect of the Shariah that if one were to deny or mock, he would be denying or mocking the verses of the Koran and the narrations of the Prophet ... and thereby apostatizing from Islam.

Starting in 2013, the ISIL began "encouraging takfir of Muslims deemed insufficiently pure in regard of tawhid (monotheism)". The Taliban were found "to be "a 'nationalist' movement, all too tolerant" of Shia. In 2015 ISIL "pronounced Jabhat al-Nusrat—then al-Qaida's affiliate in Syria—an apostate group."

One of ISIL's "most infamous large-scale killings" was the June 2014 Camp Speicher massacre in Iraq, "when the group murdered more than 1,500 Shi’a army cadets in Tikrit". In a film made by ISIL about the Camp Speicher massacre, a narrator states: "All are apostates who have come from cities of apostates to kill Sunnis here, we have more than 2,000 of them."

==== Attacks on Sufis ====
Along with Shia, ISIL and to a lesser extent Al-Qaeda have takfired Sufi Muslims, considering their the shrines and these living saints a violation of monotheism. The deadliest attack by ISIL on Sufis, and "the worst terrorist attack in Egypt's modern history", occurred on 24 November 2017, when approximately 40 gunmen attacked the al-Rawda mosque (associated with the Jaririya Sufi order) near El-Arish Sinai during Friday prayers. 311 people were killed and at least 122 injured. While no group claimed responsibility for the attack, the Islamic State's Wilayat Sinai branch was strongly suspected. On 25 November, the Egyptian public prosecutor's office, citing interviews with survivors, said the attackers brandished the Islamic State flag. In an interview in the Islamic State magazine Rumiyah (January 2017 issue five) an insurgent Islamic State commander condemned Sufi practices and identified the district where the attack occurred as one of three areas where Sufis live in Sinai that Islamic State intended to "eradicate."

=== Syrian civil war ===
Writing in 2014, Aaron Y. Zelin and Phillip Smyth argue that the combatants in the Syrian Civil War have used sectarian language to "cast one another" as non-Muslims (infidels), dehumanizing the enemy and intensifying the bloodshed and mayhem. The Shia Hizbollah, for example, had successfully "tarred all shades of the opposition, and indeed sometimes all Sunnis", with the brush of "takfiri". The Sunnis and Shiites antagonism has spread from Syria, Iraq and Lebanon, so that "there have been incidents in Australia, Azerbaijan, Britain, and Egypt". Well-known cleric Yusuf al-Qaradawi, who was often considered moderate, declared Nusayris (Alawites) of Syria bigger infidels than even the Jews or Christians in a conference in June 2013 in Cairo (a conference that called for jihad in Syria and was attended by the Grand Imam of al-Azhar), for their worship of Ali rather than God. Indications that executions of the enemy may have religious motivation came from an October 2013 video clip where Shiite Islamist fighters executed alleged captured Syrian rebels with the claim by one of the shooters that: "We are performing our taklif [religious order] and we are not seeking personal vengeance."

=== Boko Haram in Nigeria ===
According to researchers Jacob Zenna and Zacharias Pier, takfir has been a major part of the focus of Boko Haram under the leadership of Abubakar Shekau.

...after 2010 ... Shekau, believed that jihad was obligatory and that not actively joining his jihad was tantamount to apostasy. This did not mean Shekau actively killed anyone after he announced jihad and renamed the group "JAS" in 2010. Rather, there was a "priority scale" with Christians, the government, and publicly anti-JAS Muslim preachers targeted first. This also meant any Muslims killed collaterally were not a concern since they were "guilty" for not having joined his jihad. ... [by] October 2010, ... assassinations targeting Muslim religious leaders, especially Salafists who opposed JAS's religious interpretation, as well as civil servants, became an almost weekly occurrence in northeastern Nigeria. In addition to this, prisons, banks, churches and beer halls also were common targets of attack.

The policy led to a schism in the group, and after Shekau ordered an "urban invasion" (the January 2012 Northern Nigeria attacks) in Kano, where "up to 200 people" were killed, a splinter group called "Ansaru" left, complaining of the excessive killing of Muslims.

== See also ==
- Deobandi
- Islamofascism
- Wahhabism
