= Majlis-e-Tahaffuz-e-Khatme Nabuwwat =

Islamic religious movement in Pakistan

Majlis-e-Tahaffuz-e-Khatme Nabuwwat مجلسِ تحفظِ ختمِ نبوت
- Secretary-General: Pir Afzal Qadri
- Leader: Sahibzada Hamid Raza
- Founder: Mohammad Abdul Ghafoor Hazarvi
- Founded: 1950
- Ideology: Khatam an-Nabiyyin
- Colors: Green

Website
- http://www.khatm-e-nubuwwat.org

Majlis-e-Tahaffuz-e-Khatme Nabuwwat (Urdu: مجلسِ تحفظِ ختمِ نبوت, lit. '"The Assembly to Protect the End of Prophethood"') is the programmatic name of a Pakistani Barelvi organization and Islamic religious movement in Pakistan aiming to protect the belief in the finality of prophethood of Muhammad based on Quran and Sunnah concept of Khatam an-Nabiyyin. It was founded by Mohammad Abdul Ghafoor Hazarvi in 1950.

== After Independence of Pakistan ==
The roots of Majlis-e-Tahaffuz-e-Khatme Nabuwwat can be traced back to the 1880s when Mirza Ghulam Ahmad of Qadian proclaimed himself to be a prophet in Islam. The organization gained momentum during the 1953 riots against Ahmadi Muslims. The Court of enquiry report on the disturbances explains the real reasons for this violent uprising against Ahmadiyya. Main reasons being criticism of Ahmadi was due to the theological differences and using the Ahmadiyya issues by Muslim conservatives to gain political mileage. The rioters had three major demands:

1. Removal of Sir Muhammad Zafarullah Khan from the foreign ministry
2. Removal of Ahmadi Muslims from top government offices;
3. Declaration of Ahmadis as non-Muslims.

The movement launched countrywide campaigns and protests to persecute Ahmadis across the nation. Majlis, along with many religious leaders, spearheaded this movement to declare Ahmadis as non-Muslims.

== Ahmadis declared Non-Muslims in 1974 ==
Many Islamist theologians Pakistan particularly Ulama-I-Ahle-Sunnat under the leadership of Shah Ahmad Noorani Siddiqui started a successful campaign against the Ahmadis and compelled the members of the National Assembly to declare Ahmadis as non-Muslims. And such a clause was inserted in the 1973 Constitution of Pakistan declaring that followers of Mirza Ghulam Ahmed are non-Muslims by Second Amendment to the Constitution of Pakistan. After meeting the first agenda, Khatme-Nabuwat started the next phase of their campaign – to force Ahmadis to comply with the new law. They started demanding legal sanctions on Ahmadis barring them from using the title of Muslim. This campaign was at its peak when Shah Ahmad Noorani and Punjab-based Khalid Hasan Shah were leading the Kul Jamaati Majlis-e-Amal Tahafuz-e-Khatam-e-Nabuwat in 1984 and 1985. The then president General Muhammad Zia-ul-Haq passed an ordinance in 1984 amending the Pakistan Penal Code (PPC) that called for punitive sanctions on Ahmadis in 1984, commonly known as Ordinance XX.

== Present ==
The TLP political party opposes any change in the blasphemy law of Pakistan and also claims the hanging of Mumtaz Qadri was unjustifiable. They demand that Sharia law be established as law of Pakistan through a gradual legal and political process. This is a Sunni majority group and most of its members belong to Barelvi school of thought.

=== Restoration of Khatm e Nabuwat Bill ===
The government of Pakistan uses the word "oath". This word was changed to "declaration" in "Elections Bill 2017", by government authorities. Country wide objections arose about this change, Minister of Law Zahid Hamid said "The statement of objects and reasons of the amended in order to avoid controversy, there is a consensus among the political parties in the National Assembly that the original text of ‘Declaration and oath by the person nominated”, included in original form-1A should be restored in toto'. Tehreek Labbaik Pakistan, being a pro-Muslim party, went on to protests. The protests occurred in whole country including federal capital, Islamabad.

Khadim Hussain Rizvi declared to continue the protests until their demands were met. In November 2017, government restored the previous version of the blasphemy law and Khatm e Nabuwat. They continued their protests even after restoration of words for Khatm-e-Nabuwat for elections bill. According to this Tehreek, it was a plan to weaken Khatm-e-Nabuwat. The Tehreek demanded resignations of Zahid Hamid for he was held responsible for the change of words and Rana Sanaullah Khan for his pro-Ahmadiyya speeches. The government cut off food and water supply to participants of sit-in but they declared to continue the protests until all of their demands were fulfilled. The political unrest caused economic damage to the country.

== See also ==
- Aalmi Tehreek-e-Namoos-e-Risalat
- Meher Ali Shah
- Mohammad Abdul Ghafoor Hazarvi
- Majlis-e-Ahrar-e-Islam
- Syed Ata Ullah Shah Bukhari
- 1953 Lahore riots
- 1974 Anti-Ahmadiyya riots
- Shah Ahmad Noorani Siddiqi
- Khatme Nubuwwat Academy
- Ordinance XX
- 2017 Faizabad sit-in
