= Syed Ata-ul-Muhaimin Bukhari =

Pakistani politician (1944–2021)

Ibn-e-Ameer-e-Shariyat Hazrat Peer Ji Syed Ata-ul-Muhaimin Bukhari
- سید عطاء المہیمن بخاری

President of Majlis-e-Ahrar-ul-Islam
- In office 1999 – 6 February 2021
- Preceded by: Syed Ata-ul-Mohsin Bukhari
- Succeeded by: Syed Muhammad Kafeel Bukhari

Personal life
- Born: 1 July 1944 Amritsar, Punjab, India
- Died: 6 February 2021 (aged 76) Multan, Punjab, Pakistan
- Parent: Syed Ata Ullah Shah Bukhari (father)
- Political party: Majlis-e-Ahrar-ul-Islam

Religious life
- Religion: Islam
- Movement: Deobandi

Syed Ata-ul-Muhaimin Bukhari (1 July 1944 – 8 February 2021) (سید عطاء المہیمن بخاری) was a Pakistani scholar and religious leader, President of Majlis-e-Ahrar-ul-Islam and the son of Syed Ata Ullah Shah Bukhari.

== Books ==
Syed Ata-ul-Muhaimin Bukhari authored several books and pamphlets focusing on Islamic teachings, the ideology of Majlis-e-Ahrar-e-Islam, and contemporary issues of the Muslim ummah. Notable books include:

- احرار کا پیغام, The Message of the Ahrar — outlining the mission, ideology, and continuing relevance of the Majlis-e-Ahrar-e-Islam.
- ختم نبوت اور ہماری ذمہ داریاں, Finality of Prophethood and Our Responsibilities — a discussion of the Khatm-e-Nubuwwat belief and the duties of Muslims in defending it.
- اسلامی سیاست کے رہنما اصول, Guiding Principles of Islamic Politics — examining the principles that should guide political engagement according to Islamic teachings.
- برصغیر کے مسلمانوں کی جدوجہد, The Struggle of Muslims of the Subcontinent — a historical account of the sacrifices and movements led by Muslims during and after British colonial rule.
