= Muhammad Ismail =

Muhammad Ismail or Mohammad Ismail may refer to:

== Arts and academia ==
- Mohammad Ismail (poet) (1928–2003), Indian Telugu-language poet, critic, academic and university administrator.
- Mohammad Ismail (academic) (born 1978), Bangladeshi academic and Vice-Chancellor of Noakhali Science and Technology University
- Muhammad Ismail Zabeeh (1913–2001), Pakistani writer, orator, historian and journalist

== Politicians ==
- Mohammad Ismail (Bangladeshi politician), Bangladeshi MP
- Mohammad Ismail Khan (Indian politician) (1884–1958), 19th-century Indian politician
- Mohammad Ismail Khan (Afghan politician) (born 1946), Afghan government minister
- Mohammad Esmaeil Saeidi (born 1961), Iranian politician
- Muhammad Ismail (governor) (1927–2008), Indonesian military officer and governor of Central Java
- Muhammad Ismail (Pakistani politician), Pakistani politician from Gilgit Baltistan
- Muhammad Ismail Rahoo (born 1962), Pakistani government minister
- Muhammad Ismail of Jaora, 19th-century Indian royal from Jaora
- Mohammad Ismail Sloan a.k.a. Sam Sloan (born 1944), American perennial candidate
- M. Muhammad Ismail (1896–1972), Indian politician and founder of the Indian Union Muslim League

== Sports ==
- Mohammad Ismail (cricketer) (born 1997), Pakistani cricketer
- Mohammad Ismail Abu Shanab (born 1998), Qatari footballer

== Others ==
- Muhammad Ismail Agha, Afghan detainee at Guantanamo Bay

== See also ==
- Mohamed Ismail (disambiguation)
