= Sheikh Hissamuddin =

Indian independence activist

- شیخ حسام الدین

4th President of Majlis-i Ahrar-i Islam
- In office 1939–1940
- Preceded by: Habibur Rehman Ludhianvi
- Succeeded by: Master Taj-ud-Din Ansari

Religious life
- Religion: Islam
- Denomination: Sunni
- Jurisprudence: Hanafi
- Creed: Maturidi

Sheikh Hissamuddin was an Islamic scholar who served as the fourth president of the Majlis-i Ahrar-i Islam in three terms, first from 1939 to 1940, then from 1942 to 1946, and lastly from 1962 to 1966.

A figure in the history of Indian subcontinent and a leader of All India Majlis-e-Ahrar-ul-Islam. After the partition of India he left politics and struggle for Khatm-e-Nubuwwat movement with Syed Ata Ullah Shah Bukhari, chief of Majlis-e-Ahrar-e-Islam Pakistan. In 1953, he had a role in the movement of Tehreek-e-Khatme Nabuwwat. In 1958, the Ahrar organized again. At that time, Sheikh Hissam-ud-Din was elected for the seat of Secretary General of Majlis-e-Ahrar-e-Islam Pakistan.

== Books ==
Sheikh Hissamuddin wrote and contributed to several books and pamphlets on Islamic theology, political activism, and the independence movement in British India. Notable books attributed to him include:

- اسلام اور آزادی, Islam and Freedom — exploring the relationship between Islamic teachings and the struggle for independence.
- تحریک احرار کی تاریخ, History of the Ahrar Movement — a historical account of the Majlis-e-Ahrar-e-Islam and its role in Indian politics.
- مسلمانانِ ہند کے مسائل, The Problems of Indian Muslims — essays addressing the social and political challenges faced by Muslims in British India.
- علماء اور سیاست, The Ulama and Politics — discussing the role of religious scholars in political movements.

His writings, along with his speeches and articles published in contemporary newspapers and journals, contributed to the intellectual discourse on Islam, nationalism, and colonialism.
