= M. R. Kayani =

Pakistani judge (1902–1962)

Chief Justice of West Pakistan
- In office 1958–1962
- Preceded by: S. A. Rahman
- Succeeded by: Manzoor Qadir

Personal details
- Born: Malik Muhammad Rustam Khan Kayani; 18 October 1902 Kohat District, North-West Frontier Province, British India
- Died: 15 November 1962 (aged 60) Chittagong, East Pakistan, Pakistan
- Resting place: Shahpur, Khyber Pakhtunkhwa, Pakistan

Malik Muhammad Rustam Khan Kayani (Urdu: ملک محمد رستم کیانی), also known as M. R. Kayani or Justice Kayani, (18 October 1902 – 15 November 1962) was a distinguished Pakistani jurist who served as Chief Justice of West Pakistan from 1958 to 1962. He is noted for his opposition to the dictatorship of General Ayub Khan.

== Life and career ==
He hailed from the village Shahpur, in Kohat, Pakistan, where he was born on 18 October 1902 to an ethnic Pashtun family in the home of Khan Bahadur Abdul Samad Khan Kayani. He passed the matriculation examination from Islamia High School Kohat and did his F.A. from Edwards College, Peshawar. He earned his master's degree in English from Government College, Lahore.

He started his career in civil service in Punjab, British India in 1927, and after having served for eight years on the executive side, he was transferred to the judiciary in 1938. He rose to become a judge of the Punjab High Court in 1949 and then the chief justice of the West Pakistan High Court in 1958. In 1956, he was elected president of the West Pakistan Branch of the CSP Association. In that capacity he strove to uphold the status of the Civil service of Pakistan. He was also the member of the famous Punjab Disturbances Court of Inquiry.

== As a chief justice ==
Kayani retired in October 1962. He was not elevated to the Supreme Court of Pakistan because of his open criticism of the military regime. The citizens of Lahore arranged a farewell reception in his honor in which he was named as Lisan-e-Pakistan (Voice of Pakistan).

In one of his more memorable comments he wrote:

"There are quite a few thousand men who would rather have the freedom of speech than a new suit of clothes and it is these that form a nation, not the office hunters, the licenses even the tillers of the soil and drawers of the water."

One major Pakistani English newspaper comments about him, "Mr. Kayani was gifted with a keen sense of humour. He was satirical without being sarcastic, humorous without being offensive. Frail, lean and thin, he was very gentle and genial in conversation, yet firm and unshakable in conviction."

== Last visit ==
In November 1962, he embarked upon a visit to East Pakistan where he was invited by the Bar Associations of Dhaka, Rajshahi and Chittagong. He died on 15 November 1962 in Chittagong Circuit House. His half-written speech was lying on the table beside his bed. The collections of his English and Urdu speeches entitled Not the Whole Truth, Some More Truth and Afkar-e-Pareeshan appeared posthumously.

== Legacy ==
One of the six boarding hostels at the Garrison Cadet College Kohat is named in his honour.
