= Agha Shorish Kashmiri =

Pakistani journalist and poet (1917–1975)

- Born: Abdul Karim; 14 August 1917; Lahore, Punjab, British India
- Died: 25 October 1975 (aged 58); Lahore, Punjab, Pakistan
- Citizenship: Pakistani
- Occupations: Journalist, orator, poet, political activist, historian
- Writing career
- Pen name: Shorish
- Genres: Nazm poetry and newsmagazine editor
- Notable works: Chattan weekly magazine of Lahore, Pakistan
- Movement: Indian independence movement

Agha Shorish Kashmiri (1917–1975; Urdu: آغا شورش کاشمیری) was a Pakistani Islamic scholar, journalist and author, who was a senior leader of the Majlis-e-Ahrar-e-Islam.

He was a figure of the Indian independence movement in the British Raj during the 1930s and 1940s, as well as the chief editor of the weekly Chattan magazine launched from Lahore in Pakistan on 1 January 1949.

Kashmiri died in 1975 at Lahore, Pakistan.

== Early life and career ==
Kashmiri started his political career in 1935 when he delivered a historic speech at the Shaheed Ganj Mosque conference when Maulana Zafar Ali Khan was serving as the President of Ahrar Party, India. He was a student of Maulana Zafar Ali Khan but was disappointed by the violence at the Shaheed Ganj Mosque in 1935.

Kashmiri was impressed by Chaudhry Afzal Haq as well, who was a political leader of the Indian sub-continent, so he joined All-India Majlis-e-Ahrar-e-Islam and the struggle for Ahrar Party. Kashmiri was also impressed by his religious and political teacher (teacher meaning murshad in the Urdu language) Ameer-e-Shariyyat Syed Ata Ullah Shah Bukhari.

Kashmiri was elected as Secretary-General of All-India Majlis-e-Ahrar-e-Islam in 1946. He played a role in Tehreek-e-Khatme Nabuwwat in 1974 during Zulfiqar Ali Bhutto's regime in Pakistan.

== Death ==
Agha Shorish Kashmiri died in 1975 at Lahore, Pakistan.

In 2014, then Punjab governor in Pakistan, Chaudhry Muhammad Sarwar was speaking at a book-launching ceremony in Lahore. This book was written about the late Agha Shorish Kashmiri's life. The Punjab governor said that he was a great journalist who had exposed oppression everywhere. Journalists today can learn a lot from him. The governor said that Maulana Zafar Ali Khan's influence was reflected in Kashmiri's writings and Attaullah Shah Bukhari's influence in Kashmiri's speech.

== Books ==
- Qaid-i farang, Maulānā Ẓafar ʻAlī K̲h̲ān̲ ke ayām-i asīrī, on Zafar Ali Khan قیدِ فرنگ -مولانا ظفر علی خان کے ایامِ اسیری
- Kulliyyāt-i Shorish Kāshmīrī, کُلیاتِ شورش کاشمیری his poetry collection
- Iqbāl aur Qādiyāniyat, اِقبال اور قادیانیات on the relations between Muhammad Iqbal and the Ahmadiyya
- al-Jihād va al-jihād الجِہاد والجِہاد, poetry about the 1965 Indo-Pakistan war
- Iqbal, payāmbar-i inqilāb اقبال پیامبرِ اِنقلاب, Collection of addresses and articles about Muhammad Iqbal
- Hindustān men̲ Ibn-i Taymiyah ہندوستان میں ابن تیمیہ, author's reminiscences on the life and eminence of Abul Kalam Azad
- Qalmī cihre قلمی چہرے, articles chiefly on literary and political personalities from South Asia
- Tahrik i khatm-i nubūvvat, 1891 se 1974 tak تحریکِ ختمِ نبوّت ۱۸۹۱ سے ۱۹۷۴ تک, on the history of the movement defending the finality of prophet-hood (1891–1947)
- Cih qalandarānah guftam, چہ قلندراں گفتم poetry
- Nau ratan : Lāhaur ke nau ṣaḥāfiyon̲ kā ijmālī taz̲kirah نو رتن: لاھور کے نو صحافیوں کا اجمالی تذکرہ, biographical study of nine journalists from Lahore
- Maẓāmīn-i Shorish مضامینِ شورش : Āg̲h̲ā Shorish Kāshmīrī kī g̲h̲air mudavvin adabī aur tāʼas̲s̲urātī taḥrīren̲ آغا شورش کاشمیری کی غیر مدون ادبی اور تاثراتی تحریریں, collection of literary articles by the author
- Mirzāʻīl; Qādiyāniyat kā siyāsī maḥāsabah مِرزائیل؛ قادیانیت کی سیاسی مہا بھاشا, on the Ahmadiyya
- Iqbāliyāt-i Shorish اِقبالیاتِ شورش, criticism and interpretation on the works of Muhammad Iqbal
- Sayyid ʻAt̤āʼullāh Shāh Bukhārī : savāniḥ va afkār سید عطاء اللہ شاہ بُخاری: سوانح و افکار, on the life and work of Syed Ata Ullah Shah Bukhari
- Abūlkalām Āzād : savāniḥ o afkārابوالکلام آزاد: سوانح و افکار, on the life and works of Abul Kalam Azad
- Buay Gul Nala-E-Dil Dood-E-Charagh-E-Mehfil by Shorish Kashmiri
- Pase Diwar E Zindan by Shorish Kashmiri
