= Zafar Ali Khan =

Poet and journalist (1874-1956)

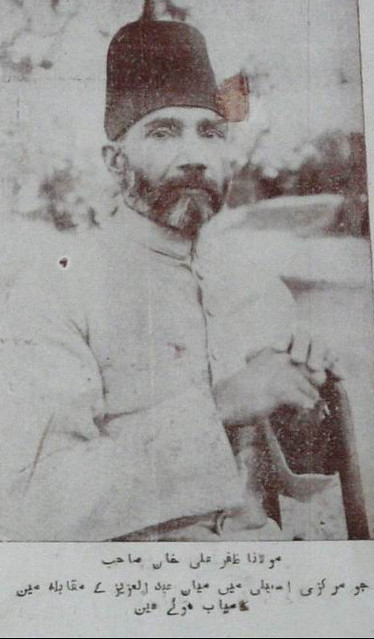
- Zafar Ali Khan in 1937
- Born: 1873; Kot Marath, Sialkot District, Punjab, British India (today Pakistan)
- Died: 27 November 1956 (aged 82–83); Wazirabad, West Pakistan, Pakistan
- Occupations: Islamic scholar Poet; Journalist
- Relatives: Raja Mehdi Ali Khan (nephew)

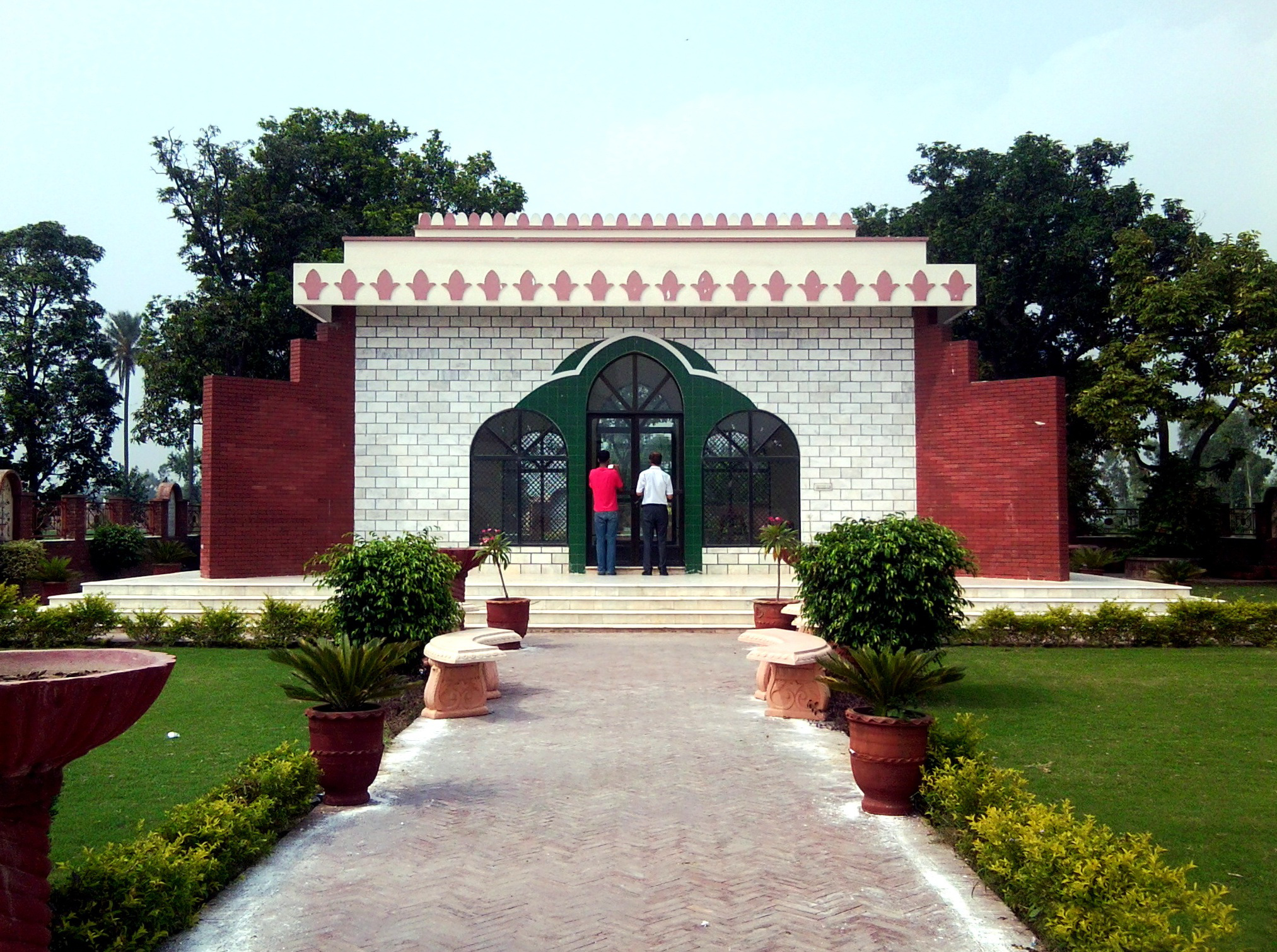
Tomb of Zafar Ali Khan

Zafar Ali Khan (Note: Urdu: ظفر علی خان, romanized: Ẓafar ʿAlī Khān) (1873 – 27 November 1956) was a Pakistani writer, poet, translator and a journalist who used his work against the British rule. He was also one of the Majlis-e-Ahrar-e-Islam's founding members.

Working with both Islamic and Western knowledge and contemporary trends in economics, sociology and politics, he is considered one of the fathers of Urdu journalism.

== Early life and education ==
Zafar was born in the Sialkot District in 1873 into a Punjabi family of the Rajput Janjua clan, as per the contemporary report of 1920.

He received his early education at Mission High School, Wazirabad, Wazirabad District, matriculated (10th grade) from Patiala, and passed his intermediate (12th grade) from the Aligarh College in 1895. Next, he worked in the postal department of the princely state of Jammu and Kashmir, the same place where his father worked, but resigned over a row with his seniors. He rejoined Aligarh College and gained his BA degree from there, placing fifth in his batch.

== Career ==
=== Journalism ===
After graduation, Khan was appointed secretary to a Muslim political leader Mohsin-ul-Mulk, then in Bombay. Then he worked for some time as a translator in Hyderabad, Deccan, rising to the post of Secretary, Home Department. He returned from Hyderabad and took over the daily Zamindar newspaper from Lahore in 1908, founded by his father Maulvi Sirajuddin Ahmad in 1903. At one time, this newspaper was an important newspaper of the Punjab.

=== Relation with the Ahmadiyya Movement ===
Zafar Ali Khan's relationship with the Ahmadiyya was belligerent. He was among the vanguard, who censured Mirza Ghulam Ahmad from Qadian by writing satirical poems against him. He even wrote the preface to the book "His Holiness", which was written as a refutation of the Ahmadiyya movement. Later on, when Pakistan was created, he was an ardent participant in the 1953 Tehreek e Khatm e Nabuwat (a movement against the Ahmadis), writing articles against them.

=== Poetry ===
He chose to write in Urdu. Khan's interest in poetry began in his childhood. His poems have religious and political sentiments. He was especially versed in impromptu compositions. His poetical output includes Baharistan, Nigaristan, and Chamanistan. His other works are Marka-e-Mazhab-o-Science, Ghalba-e-Rum, Sayr-e-Zulmet and an opera Jang-e-Roos-o-Japan.

==== Most popular Naats ====
- Woh Shama Ujalaa Jis Ne Kiya 40 Baras Tak Ghaaron Mein sung by Mehdi Hassan, a Radio Pakistan production, a popular Naat written by Zafar Ali Khan
- 'Dil jis se zinda hai woh tamanna tum hi tau ho' sung by Muneeba Sheikh, a Pakistan Television production, a popular Naat written by Zafar Ali Khan

== Death and legacy ==
He died on 27 November 1956, and was buried in Wazirabad, Punjab. His funeral prayer was led by his companion and friend Mohammad Abdul Ghafoor Hazarvi.

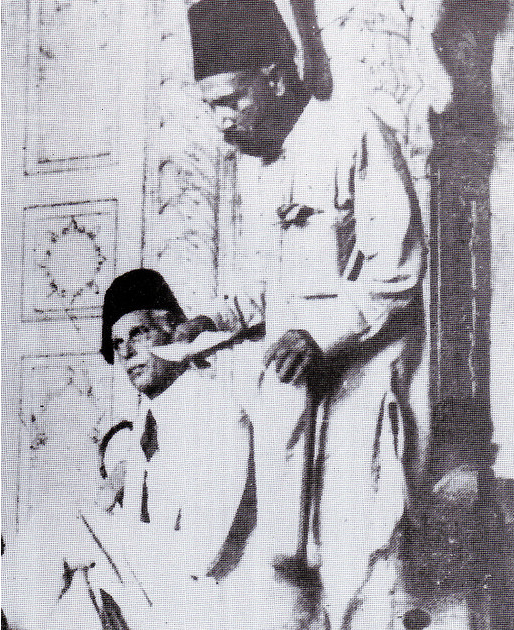
Muhammad Ali Jinnah with Maulana Zafar Ali Khan at Badshahi Mosque in 1940

Sahiwal Stadium, а multi-purpose stadium in Sahiwal, Punjab, was renamed as Zafar Ali Stadium in his honour. It is used for football and cricket games. The stadium holds 10,000 people.

Zafar Ali Khan was an active member of the Khilafat Movement and a close associate of Maulana Muhammad Ali Jauhar.

Renowned journalist Agha Shorish Kashmiri, was among his notable protege.

S. M. Ikram, a noted Pakistani scholar and historian writes about Zafar Ali Khan:

"He was young, forceful and courageous, and enthusiastically responded to the new political trends. In his hands the Zamindar became the most influential Urdu daily of Northern India and his role in politics was second only to that of Ali Brothers and Abul Kalam Azad during the Khilafat movement".

Later, he also served the Pakistan Movement and was an outspoken activist against British rule. Recognising Zafar Ali Khan's contributions to the Pakistan Movement, the Punjab government in Pakistan established a 'Maulana Zafar Ali Khan Trust' that initiated the 'Zafar Ali Khan Award' for outstanding journalists to be awarded every year. A public degree college in Wazirabad is named after him as Government Maulana Zafar Ali Khan Degree College.

=== Commemorative postage stamp ===
Pakistan Post issued a commemorative postage stamp in his honor in its 'Pioneers of Freedom' series.

== Books ==
Some of his notable publications include:

=== Poetry ===
- Bahāristān
- Nigāristān
- Camanistān
- Rahāristān
- Armag̲h̲ān-i Qādiyān
- Kulliyāt-i Maulānā Ẓafar ʻAlī K̲h̲ān
- Ḥabsiyāt
- Nashīd-i Shīrāz, collection of Persian poems and articles published in different periodicals
- K̲h̲amistān-i Ḥijāz, poetry about Muhammad

=== Essays ===
- G̲h̲albah-yi Rūm: ek tārīk̲h̲ī tafsīr, historical commentary of Sūrat ar-Rūm on the victory of Romans over the Persians and the Muslims over the Meccan polytheists as predicted by Koran in AD 615
- Taqārīr-i Maulānā Ẓafar ʻAlī K̲h̲ān̲, speeches of the author, especially in regard with the Khilafat movement
- Lat̤āʼifuladab, on the relation between literature and Islam
- Mʻaās̲h̲irat, on the social sciences
- Jamāluddīn Afg̲h̲ānī: yaʻnī itiḥād-i Islāmī ke muharrik-i aʻzīm, Misr, Ṭarkī, Īrān aur Hindūstān ke z̲arīʻah ʻalim-i Islām man̲, biography of the Muslim reformer and independence fighter Jamāl al-Dīn al-Afghānī

=== Plays ===
- Jang-i Rus va Japān: yaʻnī ek tārīk̲h̲ī ḍrāmā, a play on the Russian Japanese War, (1904–1905)

=== Translations ===
- Jangal buk, Urdu translation from the English of Rudyard Kipling's Jungle Book
- Al-Farooq: the life of Omar the Great, English translation from the Urdu of Shibli Nomani's Al-Farooq, a biography of Umar

== See also ==
- List of Pakistani journalists
- List of people on the postage stamps of Pakistan

== Notes ==
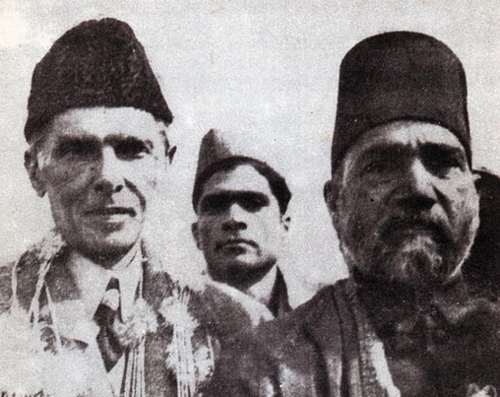
Quaid-e-Azam with Maulana Zafar Ali Khan

Maulana would never miss a chance to snub the British government and the Heavens had provided him ample opportunities to carry out his sacred mission. Shaheed Ghazi Ilam Din had killed a blasphemous person and was sent to gallows in the Mianwali jail. The government buried him in Mianwali which infuriated the Muslims in Punjab. They protested and made a unanimous demand to bring Shaeed's body to Lahore but no one was prepared to give coverage to their voice as Hindus dominated most of the newspapers in the old Punjab before 1947. A large procession led by Lal Din Qaiser reached the office of Zamindar in 1903 newspaper which was the only hope for the Muslims at that time and succeeded in getting newspaper coverage for their event.
