= Habibur Rehman Ludhianvi =

Islamic scholar and freedom fighter (1892–1956)

- حبیب الرحمن لدھیانوی

3rd President of Majlis-i Ahrar-i Islam
- In office 1935–1939
- Preceded by: Chaudhry Afzal Haq
- Succeeded by: Sheikh Hissamuddin

Personal details
- Born: 3 July 1892 Ludhiana, Punjab, India
- Died: 2 September 1956 (aged 64)

Religious life
- Religion: Islam
- Denomination: Sunni
- Jurisprudence: Hanafi
- Creed: Maturidi

Habibur Rehman Ludhianvi (Note: Urdu: حبیب الرحمن لدھیانوی) (3 July 1892 – 2 September 1956) was an Islamic scholar who served as the third president of the Majlis-i Ahrar-i Islam from 1935 to 1939.

He belonged to an Arain tribe and was a direct lineal descendant of Shah Abdul Qadir Ludhianvi, the freedom fighter against British Colonial rule during the Indian Rebellion of 1857.

== Biography ==
=== Family history ===
Habibur Rehman Ludhianvi's grandfather Shah Abdul Qadir Ludhianvi led an armed rebellion against the British East India Company during the Indian Rebellion of 1857 and was among the first ones to rebel against them from the Punjab. Abdul Qadir gathered a large fighting force that drove the British out of not only Ludhiana but also Panipat. This fighting force included Muslims, Hindus and Sikhs. He then proceeded to Delhi to support the Mughal emperor Bahadur Shah II. Abdul Qadir Ludhianvi gave his life fighting along with thousands of others at Chandni Chowk, Delhi in 1857.

== Early life and career ==
Habibur Rehman Ludhianvi was born on 3 July 1892 at Ludhiana, British India. He married Bibi Shafatunnisa, the daughter of Abdul Aziz.

Ludhianvi was one of the founders of Majlis-e-Ahrar-ul-Islam, a nationalist movement that wanted an end to the British rule in India. He chose to stay back in East Punjab, India to represent thousands of Muslims still remaining there, after the partition and the independence of Pakistan on 14 August 1947, thus becoming aother symbol of secularism in India along with Maulana Abul Kalam Azad and Rafi Ahmed Kidwai. He was also known to be a sincere supporter of India's Congress Party. He argued, at that time, that the remaining Muslims in East Punjab should not be abandoned. Ludhiana is considered a major industrial city of Punjab, India. A large number of working Muslims from the provinces of Uttar Pradesh and Bihar also come there to work.

=== Accomplishments ===
- Among his accomplishments was the end of practice of keeping separate water pitchers at railway stations in India for Hindus and Muslims which he successfully opposed and this practice finally ended.
- After independence of India and Pakistan in 1947, he set up a "Phir Basau Committee" (Rehabilitation Committee) to make possible the return of Muslim, Hindu and Sikh girls who had been forcibly detained in the turbulent circumstances to their parents' homes in all three countries.

== Death ==
Habibur Rehman was prisoned for 14 years, during his lifetime, at various places like Shimla, Mianwali, Multan, Dharamshala and Ludhiana. This took a toll on his health and he developed a serious infection in jail which ended his life on 2 September 1956 at age 64.

== See also ==
- List of Deobandis
