= Mazhar Ali Azhar =

British Indian and Pakistani politician

- Born: 13 March 1895; Batala, Punjab, British India
- Died: 4 November 1974 (aged 79); Lahore, Punjab, Pakistan
- Education: Government College University, Lahore
- Occupations: Lawyer; Islamic scholar; politician
- Spouse: Fatima Mazhar
- Children: Bakhtiar Abbas (son); Qaiser Mustafa (son); Khakan Babar (son); Riaz Fatima (daughter); Imtiaz-un-Nisa (daughter)
- Parent: Muhammad Abdullah (Father)

Mazhar Ali Azhar (13 March 1895 – 4 November 1974) was a politician in British India and later Pakistan, and one of the founders of Majlis-e-Ahrar-ul-Islam. He was elected three times to the Punjab Assembly, took part in the Madhe Sahaba Agitation in Lucknow, and became a prominent opponent to the partition of India.

== Early life and education ==
He was born on 13 March 1895 in Batala, Punjab, British India. He graduated with a Bachelor of Arts from Government College University, Lahore in 1915 and later earned a Bachelor of Laws in 1917. He began practising as a lawyer in 1918.

== Career ==
He was born into a Shia family but later joined the Deobandi movement within Sunni Islam and ran a madrassa and mosque in Gurdaspur. Being a close companion of Syed Attaullah Shah Bukhari, he joined Majlis-e-Ahrar-ul-Islam, an offshoot of the Khilafat Movement.

=== Role in Madhe Sahaba Agitation ===
The Madhe Sahaba Agitation of Lucknow is predecessor of the sectarian violence in Pakistan. Mazhar Ali Azhar played a prominent role in that movement. He believed that "Madhe Sahaba can be a weapon against the League"- an obvious reference to Jinnah's own background as a Khoja Shia. Justice Munir wrote in his report:

How they attempted to defeat the Muslim League with Islam as their weapon will be apparent from some utterances of Maulana Mazhar Ali Azhar, the Ahrar leader, to whom is ascribed the couplet in which the Quaid-i-Azam was called kafir-i-azam. This gentleman is a Shia, but madh-i-sahaba with him is dearer than life, and during the days of Shia-Sunni riots in Lucknow both he and his son adopted this slogan which rouses the fire of every Shia and went from Lahore to Lucknow to fan the Shia-Sunni fire. Speaking outside Bhati Gate at a public meeting of the Ahrar, he said that he had, for the preceding two or three months, been asking the Muslim League whether the names of sahaba-i-karam would be revered in Pakistan, but had received no reply. He alleged that in the Congress-governed Provinces where Government was still with the British and the League had no power, the Leaguers were not permitting the sahaba to be named with reverence and asked whether, if power passed to the League; the state of affairs would be the same as in Lucknow and other Provinces where Muslims were in a majority and madh-i- sahaba would be an offence. Proceeding, he inquired if words of praise for Hazrat Abu Bakr, Hazrat Umar and Hazrat Usman could not be uttered in Lucknow and Mahmudabad, what would be the condition in League's Pakistan and what interest the Musalmans could have in such Pakistan (vide 'Shahbaz' of 20 November 1945)? In its issue of 2 November 1945, the 'Nawa-i-Waqt' published a letter written by this very gentleman to another Ahrar leader. As the genuineness of this letter was questioned, we examined Maulana Mazhar Ali Azhar about it. He says that he does not definitely remember having written it but since this letter was published in one of the prominent papers of Lahore and was not contradicted by him, we have no hesitation in holding that the Maulana did write this letter. It is impossible that the Maulana, a renowned leader as he was in those days, should not have been aware of the publication of this letter, and, if he failed to contradict it, the only inference can be that the 'Nawa-i-Waqt' was in possession of the original letter, the authorship of which, in case the matter came to proof, could have conclusively been proved. The subject-matter of this letter is again madh-i- sahaba and we may repeat that the Maulana himself is a Shia. In this letter the Maulana says that the weapon of madh-i-sahaba could effectively be used against the League and that both the League and that both the League and the Government will have to surrender over this issue whatever might, be the result of the elections. This conduct of the Maulana shows quite clearly how the Ahrar and other parties can conveniently exploit religion for their political ends. In this connection we may also mention a similar effort made by the Muslim League itself in 1946 to have pirs and masha'ikh, who command considerable followings, on its side in the struggle for the establishment of Pakistan."

=== Life after independence ===
Mazhar Ali Azhar referred to Jinnah as Kafir-e-Azam ("The Great Kafir"). He, as with other Ahrar leaders, opposed the partition of India.

In 1947, after the creation of Pakistan, he choose to reside in Lahore. He took part in the 1953 riots against Ahmadiyya community. Under the Displaced Persons Act of 1957, he was allotted a Bungalow in Fane Road, Lahore by the government of Pakistan against his claim of the assets he had left behind while migrating from Gurdaspur. He died in 1974.

== Books, essays & articles ==
As a prominent Ahrari leader and scholar, authored and translated several works in Urdu and was active in writing political essays and speeches.

| Original title | English Translation | Year | Publisher | Type | Description |
|---|---|---|---|---|---|
| Soviet Rūs kā Nizām-e-Kāry | The Working System of Soviet Russia | 1905 | Punjab Academy (Amritsar) | Urdu Translation | Translation of a work outlining Soviet economic and administrative systems. |
| – | Political speeches and essays in Ahrar publications | 1930s–1940s | – | Essay/Speeches | Numerous political writings and speeches during the Ahrar campaigns, particularly on Muslim electoral politics. |
| Judāgāna Intikhab se Pakistan Tak | From Partition to Pakistan Through Segregated Elections | 1944 | – | Book | A political analysis of the 1946 elections and transition to Pakistan. |
| Dunyā kī Bisāat-e-Siyāsat | The Global Political Balance | – | – | Book | A survey of international political dynamics and post-war global order. |
