= Ismail Mohamed =

Ismail Mohamed may refer to:

== Given name ==
- Ismail Mohamed (activist) (born 1983), Egyptian atheist human rights activist
- Ismail Mohamed (footballer) (born 1980), Maldivian footballer
- Ismail Mohamed (Malaysian politician), Malaysian politician
- Ismail Mohamed (mathematician) (1930–2013), South African activist and mathematician
- Ismail Mohamed (Ohio politician) (born 1992), American politician
- Ismail Mohamed Ali (1918–1998), Malaysian businessman
- Ismail Mohamed Osman, Somalilander lawyer
- Ismail Mohamed Said (born 1965), Malaysian politician
- Ismail Mohamed Youssef (born 1967), Qatari athletics competitor

== See also ==
- Ismaeel Mohammad (born 1990), Qatari professional footballer
- Ismail Mahomed (1931–2000), South African lawyer and co-author of the Constitution of Namibia
- Ismail Mahomed Ayob (born 1942), South African lawyer
- Ismail Mohammed (disambiguation)
- Mohamed Ismail (disambiguation)
