= Ismail Mohammed =

Ismail Mohammed may refer to:

- Ismail Mohammed Sharif (born 1962), Iraqi footballer
- Ismail Mohammed (football coach) (1922–2008), Iraqi football coach
- Ismail Mohammad, Bangladeshi screenwriter

== See also ==
- Ismail Mohamed (disambiguation)
- Ismaeel Mohammad (born 1990), Qatari professional footballer
