= Muhammad Ismail Zabeeh =

Pakistani writer, historian and journalist (1913–2001)

- محمد اسماعیل ذبیح
- Born: 1913; Gwalior, Gwalior State, British India (now, Madhya Pradesh, India)
- Died: 27 September 2001 (aged 87 or 88); Islamabad, Pakistan
- Known for: Being an advocate of the Pakistan Movement; Works regarding History

Maulana Muhammad Ismail Zabeeh (1913 – 27 September 2001) was a Pakistani writer, orator, historian and journalist who actively participated in the Pakistan movement, during British Raj. He was a leader of Majlis-e-Ahrar-ul-Islam.

== Family origins ==
Zabeeh hailed from a scholarly family of Hazara heritage. He was born to Maulana Ghulaam Yahya Hazarvi, at Gwalior, British India, in 1913. His studied under various luminaries of his time. They included two famous students of the eminent Maulana Muhammad Qasim Nanotvi.

== Educational career ==
In his early teens, Zabeeh went to the institution headed by his father. At 13 he was studying Arabic language at the Darul Uloom of Deoband when his father recalled him to Jamia Illahiyaat, at Kanpur. He later went to study Jamia Millia at Delhi and studied under Dr. Zakir Husain.

== Efforts for the Pakistan Movement ==
His sagacity and journalistic talent caught the attention of Muhammad Ali Jinnah who appointed him as the head of the publicity campaign of the All India Muslim league in the 1946 elections. Due to his effective and persuasive publicity campaign in favour of Muslim League candidates, they won almost all the 67 Muslim seats in Uttar Pradesh. He also campaigned for the victory of Liaquat Ali Khan, which was acknowledged by the later during his address to a large gathering at Kanpur.

== Journalist career ==
His journalistic career started while he was in his teens, and last until his death at the age of 87. In his early teens, he remained associated with 'Bombay punch' (a humorous mag), 'Paishwa' and 'Maulvi' at Delhi, and published the monthly 'Arif'. He reported the 'Kanpur Riots' at the age of 17 in 1930. He also was publicity secretary of All India Majlis-e-Ahrar-ul-Islam in 1938. Upon arrest of its president Ameer-e-Shariyat Maulana Syed Ata Ullah Shah Bukhari, Zabeeh acted as president of All India Majlis-e-Ahrar-ul-Islam in 1939. In 1941, he started publishing the 'Qaumi Akhbar', an Urdu-language daily, which soon became the leading voice of the uprising against the Britons, in the Muslim struggle for a free homeland. In 1947, he started publishing the Urdu-language daily 'Khursheed' from Karachi, along with Mr. Raees Ahmed. In 1949, he published his first English-language daily the 'Voice of Sindh' from Hyderabad. In 1954, he published the Urdu-language daily, the 'Anjam', which later evolved to 'Mashriq' in the 1960s and for which he was chief editor.

== As a historian ==
Zabeeh had particular interest in the history of the Indian subcontinent and its civilization. This became evident by the well-researched books he wrote on this subject.

== Works ==
- Quran-e- Kareem ke inqilbai faisley (The revolutionary judgements of the Holy Qur'an)
- Barr-e-sagheer main musalmanon ke urooj-o-zawaal ka aik aaina (A reflection of the rise and fall of the Muslims of subcontinent)
- Arthshastra – Kautilya Chankiya ke ramooz-e-siyasat aur hukumraani
- Islamabad – Aik Manzil-e-Muraad
- Islamabad – maazi, haal aur mustaqbil (Islamabad – past, present and future)
