= Persecution of Ahmadis (Pakistan) =

Social exclusion of Ahmadi Muslims in Pakistan

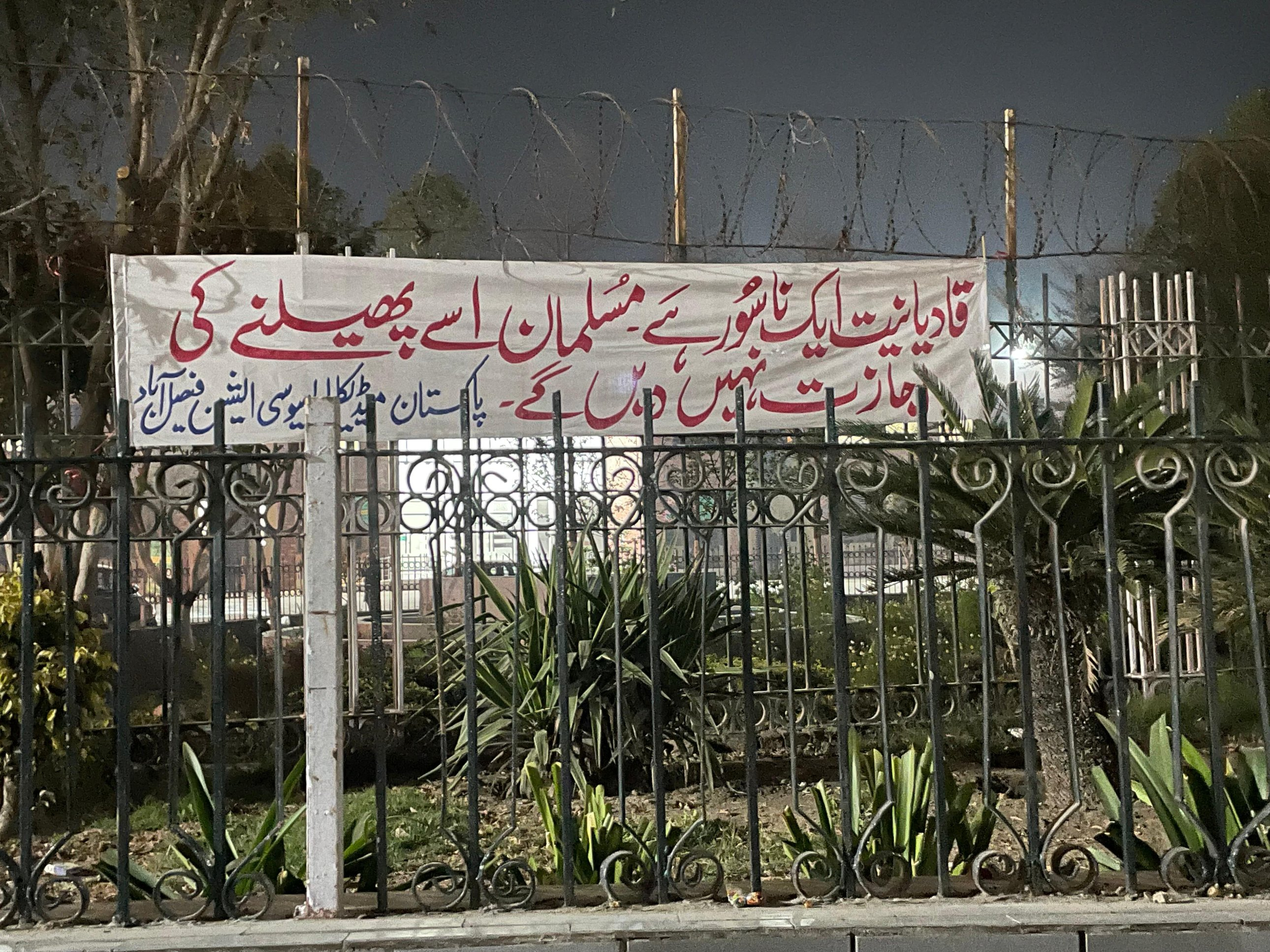
Banner containing hate speech against the Ahmadiyya Muslim community displayed outside the Allied Hospital in Faisalabad. Translation: "Qadianism [Ahmadiyya] is an ulcer. Muslims shall not let it spread. ~ Pakistan Medical Association Faisalabad"

Persecution of Ahmadis or religious apartheid of Ahmadis refers to systematic discrimination, persecution, and social exclusion experienced by the Ahmadiyya Muslim Community, primarily in Pakistan, where legal and social mechanisms have been established to marginalise and oppress the community, involving legislative actions, social ostracism, religious persecution, restrictions on civil liberties, and denial of fundamental human rights, mirroring an apartheid-like state. It is also observed in several other Muslim-majority countries.

== Background ==
The Ahmadiyya Muslim Community, founded by Mirza Ghulam Ahmad in 1889, identifies itself as Muslim. However, many mainstream Islamic authorities and states, notably Pakistan, deem Ahmadis non-Muslims due to theological differences, especially regarding the finality of Muhammad's prophethood.

The persecution of Ahmadis in Pakistan began in earnest in 1953, when anti-Ahmadi riots erupted in Lahore, part of the Punjab province. Instigated by religious groups such as the Majlis-e-Ahrar and Jamaat-e-Islami, the riots resulted in the deaths of numerous Ahmadis and the imposition of martial law. The conflict between Ahmadis and Majlis-e Ahrar-e Islam, however, takes root prior to the founding of an independent Muslim state in the Indian subcontinent, as early as the 1930s, when Ahraris were opposed to the proposal of an independent Muslim state. By 1933, the Ahrar were advocating for the expulsion of Ahmadis from educational institutes and Muslim institutions as well as for a boycott of Ahmadi representation in local and central politics.

In 1974, Pakistan's government formally declared Ahmadis as non-Muslims through a constitutional amendment following political and religious pressure. This marked the institutionalization of discrimination against Ahmadis, establishing a legal basis for apartheid-like conditions. The Munir Report, authored by a judicial commission, highlighted the role of religious intolerance but failed to prevent future escalation.

== Institutionalized persecution ==
A pivotal moment in the apartheid of Ahmadis occurred on September 7, 1974, when Pakistan's parliament, under Prime Minister Zulfikar Ali Bhutto, passed the Second Amendment to the Constitution. This amendment formally declared Ahmadis as non-Muslims, effectively excluding them from the Islamic community in the eyes of the state. The decision was driven by pressure from orthodox Islamic clerics and marked the beginning of legalized discrimination against Ahmadis.

In 1984, General Muhammad Zia-ul-Haq promulgated Ordinance XX, explicitly prohibiting Ahmadis from publicly identifying as Muslims. Under this law, Ahmadis are legally forbidden from:

- Using Islamic greetings such as As-salamu alaykum.
- Calling places of worship as 'mosques'.
- Using Islamic terminology
- Reciting Islamic prayers publicly
- Preaching their beliefs openly
- Celebrating Islamic holidays including carrying out Islamic rituals such as qurbani

These restrictions effectively criminalised the public practice of Ahmadi faith, subjecting Ahmadis to imprisonment, fines, and violent attacks for perceived "blasphemy." The sole safe-haven for Ahmadis in Pakistan is Rabwah, which is officially known as Chenab Nagar - a name-change which was ordained in the 90s due to the name Rabwah being of Arabic origin, mentioned in the Quran. Similarly, Ahmadi mosques in Pakistan cannot be called a 'masjid' [mosque], and instead substituted with the word "bait" [house], or often 'Ahmadiyya hall'.

== Social ostracism and discrimination ==
Beyond legal persecution, Ahmadis face severe social discrimination and boycotts. These often involve penalties or extend to people who do not comply with commands. Incidents include:

- Deprivation of water from all water sources
- Boycotts of Ahmadi-owned businesses
- Discrimination in education and employment, including incidents of expulsion from institutions due to mere association with Ahmadiyya faith.
- Discrimination in healthcare, with patients refusing treatment from Ahmadi professionals, and likewise Ahmadis seeking treatment from non-Ahmadi professionals
- Denial of entry into various professional and governmental positions
- Denial of entry into public shops
- Exclusion from voter rolls unless they declare themselves non-Muslim
- Declaration against Ahmadi beliefs on all ID Card and passport applications
- Declaration against Ahmadi beliefs on all marriage forms
- Ban and censorship of Ahmadiyya-related literature, media, websites and applications in Pakistan

== Violence and human rights violations ==
Certain religious political organizations, notably the Khatme Nabuwat Party (also known as Majlis Tahaffuz Khatme Nubuwwat (lit. The Assembly to Protect the End of Prophethood)) and Tehreek-e-Labbaik Pakistan (TLP), have actively contributed to anti-Ahmadi sentiment and legislation. These parties have mobilized public sentiment, organized large-scale protests, and influenced political policies, demanding further legal restrictions on Ahmadis and advocating harsher enforcement of existing laws.

Tehreek-e-Labbaik Pakistan, founded by Khadim Hussain Rizvi, has been particularly influential in fueling hostility against Ahmadis by advocating for strict blasphemy laws and campaigning vigorously against perceived blasphemers, significantly exacerbating tensions and violence against Ahmadis being targeted by such extremist groups, resulting in violence and assassinations. Notable incidents include the 2010 Lahore mosque attacks, where 94 Ahmadis were killed during prayers. Human rights organizations regularly document widespread violations against Ahmadis, describing the conditions as institutionalized apartheid.

== International reactions ==
The persecution of Ahmadis has drawn condemnation from international bodies, including the United Nations, Amnesty International, Human Rights Watch, and several Western governments. Calls for Pakistan to repeal discriminatory laws and safeguard the rights of Ahmadis have repeatedly been issued but remain largely unheeded. The term "Apartheid of Ahmadis" is employed to emphasize the systemic nature of discrimination, paralleling South African apartheid, characterized by legal, social, economic, and political segregation. Critics and human rights activists argue the treatment of Ahmadis meets the criteria of apartheid defined in international law, particularly under the Rome Statute of the International Criminal Court.
