= Khilafat Movement =

Movement in India (1919–1922)

The Khilafat movement (1919–1922) was a political campaign launched by South Asian Muslims in British India over British policy against Turkey and the planned dismemberment of the Ottoman Empire after World War I by Allied forces.

Leaders participating in the movement included Ahmad Sagheer Haji Variyami, Maulana Shaukat Ali, Maulana Mohammad Ali Jauhar, Hakim Ajmal Khan, and Abul Kalam Azad who organised the movement to redress the grievances of Turkey.

Mahatma Gandhi had supported the movement as part of his opposition to the British Empire, and he also advocated for a wider non-cooperation movement at the same time. Vallabhbhai Patel, Bal Gangadhar Tilak and other Hindu and Congress figures also supported the movement.

Generally described as a protest against the sanctions placed on the Ottoman Empire after the First World War by the Treaty of Sèvres, the movement is also noted for promoting Hindu–Muslim unity. It ended in 1922 after the end of the non-cooperation movement.

== Background ==
Ottoman sultan Abdul Hamid II (1842–1918) launched his pan-Islamist program in a bid to protect the Ottoman Empire from Western attack and dismemberment and to crush the democratic opposition at home. He sent an emissary, Jamaluddin Afghani, to India in the late 19th century. The cause of the Ottoman monarch evoked religious passion and sympathy amongst Indian Muslims. Being the caliph, the Ottoman sultan was nominally the supreme religious and political leader of all Sunni Muslims across the world. However, this authority was never actually used.

A large number of Muslim religious leaders began working to spread awareness and develop Muslim participation on behalf of the caliphate. Muslim religious leader Maulana Mehmud Hasan attempted to organize a national war of independence with support from the Ottoman Empire.

Abdul Hamid II was forced to restore the constitutional monarchy, marking the start of the Second Constitutional Era by the Young Turk Revolution. He was succeeded by his brother Mehmed V (1844–1918) but following the revolution, the real power in the Ottoman Empire lay with the Young Turks. The movement was a topic in Conference of London (February 1920); however, nationalist Arabs saw it as threat of continuation of Turkish dominance of Arab lands.

=== Partitioning ===
The Ottoman Empire, having sided with the Central Powers during World War I, suffered a major military defeat. The Treaty of Versailles (1919) reduced its territorial extent and diminished its political influence but the victorious Allied Powers promised to protect the Ottoman sultan's status as the caliph. However, under the Treaty of Sèvres (1920), territories such as Palestine, Syria, Lebanon, and Iraq were severed from the empire.

Within Turkey, a progressive, secular nationalist movement arose, known as the Turkish national movement. During the Turkish War of Independence (1919–1923), the Turkish revolutionaries, led by Mustafa Kemal Atatürk, abolished the Treaty of Sèvres with the Treaty of Lausanne (1923). Pursuant to Atatürk's Reforms, the Republic of Turkey abolished the position of the caliphate in 1924. Atatürk offered the caliphate to Ahmed Sharif as-Senussi, on the condition that he reside outside Turkey; Senussi declined the offer and confirmed his support for Abdulmejid. The title was then claimed by Hussein bin Ali, Sharif of Mecca and Hejaz, leader of the Arab Revolt, but his kingdom was defeated and annexed by Ibn Saud in 1925.

== Khilafat Movement in the Indian subcontinent ==
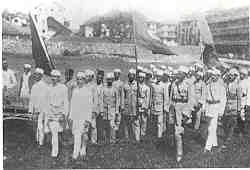
Khilafat activists leading a procession

Although political activities and popular outcry on behalf of the caliphate emerged across the Muslim world, the most prominent activities took place in India. A prominent Oxford educated Muslim journalist, Maulana Muhammad Ali Johar had spent four years in prison for advocating resistance to the colonial government and support for the caliphate. At the onset of the Turkish War of Independence, Muslim religious leaders feared for the caliphate, which the European powers were reluctant to protect. To some of the Muslims of India, the prospect of being conscripted to fight against fellow Muslims in Turkey was anathema. To its founders and followers, the Khilafat was not a religious movement but rather a show of solidarity with their fellow Muslims in Turkey.

Mohammad Ali and his brother Maulana Shaukat Ali joined with other Muslim leaders such as Pir Ghulam Mujaddid Sarhandi, Sheikh Shaukat Ali Siddiqui, Dr. Mukhtar Ahmed Ansari, Raees-Ul-Muhajireen Barrister Jan Muhammad Junejo, Hasrat Mohani, Syed Ata Ullah Shah Bukhari, Mohammad Farooq Chishti, Maulana Abul Kalam Azad and Dr. Hakim Ajmal Khan to form the All India Khilafat Committee. The organisation was based in Lucknow, India at Hathe Shaukat Ali, the compound of Landlord Shaukat Ali Siddiqui. They aimed to build political unity amongst Muslims and use their influence to protect the caliphate. In 1920, they published the Khilafat Manifesto, which called upon the British to protect the caliphate and for Indian Muslims to unite and hold the British accountable for this purpose. The Khilafat Committee in Bengal included Mohmmad Akram Khan, Manruzzaman Islamabadi, Mujibur Rahman Khan and Chittaranjan Das.

In 1920 an alliance was made between Khilafat leaders and the Indian National Congress, the largest political party in India and of the nationalist movement. Congress leader Mahatma Gandhi and the Khilafat leaders promised to work and fight together for the causes of Khilafat and Swaraj. Seeking to increase pressure on the colonial government, the Khilafatists became a major part of the non-cooperation movement – a nationwide campaign of mass, peaceful civil disobedience. Some also engaged in a protest emigration from North-West Frontier Province to Afghanistan under Amanullah Khan.

The movement also saw donations by Indians to help in this movement. A committee was also started for sending funds to help Ankara government of Mustafa Kemal.

The non-cooperation campaign was at first successful. The programme started with boycott of legislative councils, government schools, colleges and foreign goods, government functions and surrender of titles and distinctions. Massive protests, strikes and acts of civil disobedience spread across India. Hindus and Muslims joined forces in the campaign, which was initially peaceful. Gandhi, the Ali brothers and others were swiftly arrested by the colonial government. Under the flag of Tehrik-e-Khilafat, a Punjab Khilafat deputation comprising Moulana Manzoor Ahmed and Moulana Lutfullah Khan Dankauri took a leading role throughout India, with a particular concentration in the Punjab (Sirsa, Lahore, Haryana etc.). People from villages such as Aujla Khurd were the main contributors to the cause.

Although holding talks with the colonial government and continuing their activities, the Khilafat movement weakened as Muslims were divided between working for the Congress, the Khilafat cause and the Muslim League.

The Khilafat leadership fragmented on different political lines. Syed Ata Ullah Shah Bukhari created Majlis-e-Ahrar-e-Islam with the support of Chaudhry Afzal Haq. Leaders such as Dr. Ansari, Maulana Azad and Hakim Ajmal Khan remained strong supporters of Gandhi and the Congress. The Ali brothers joined Muslim League.

== Challenges to British colonization ==
Up to the turn of the 20th century, the British system of political control was effective in Sindh. During the Khilafat movement, however, the British dealt with another major challenge to their rule.

The Khilafat movement represented the first occasion on which a major number of Sindhi pirs came together on a common platform to oppose British policy, and their involvement showed the way in which they were being gradually involved in the issues of the broader Indian Muslim community. Similar to their co-religionists elsewhere, many of these pirs were affected due to the rise in pan-Islamic sentiment and also by the changing awareness of the position of Muslims in South Asia. Their participation in the agitation severely threatened to undermine the position of the British colonial rule in Sindh. Yet, regardless of the significant influence of the pirs and the considerable support which they attracted for the Khilafat cause, the system of control proved its credibility by reducing the threat posed to British rule to one of manageable proportions.

The British system of control was seriously threatened by the involvement of Sindhi pirs in the Khilafat movement. The concerns of the movement appealed strongly to a major section of the province's religious leadership as a result of the rise in interest in pan-Islamic issues during the years leading up to 1919. Support for broader Islamic concerns during this period was directly associated with the gradual erosion of the barriers which had isolated the Sindh region from developments taking place.

== Criticisms of the movement ==
Criticism of the Khilafat movement emerged regarding the religious motivations behind it, its connection to Indian nationalism and the repercussions of the collaboration between the Khilafatists and the Indian National Congress. Critics questioned whether a campaign centered around Ottoman Caliphate was compatible with a political movement intended for the unity of Indians across religious communities.

== Legacy ==
The movement is noted to have played a role in boosting unity among Hindus and Muslims. The Congress supported the movement in response to the divide and rule strategy by the British. The period of 1919–1922 is widely seen as the heyday of Hindu-Muslim unity. Mustafa Kemal Atatürk had thanked the Congress for its sympathy, and hoped that it would soon gain Swaraj.

The movement is described as a milestone in the growth of the Muslim nationalism and the history of civil disobedience in India. For example, Muhammad Ali Jinnah, who had at the time been a force for Hindu–Muslim unity in the aftermath of the 1916 Lucknow Pact, left the Congress after his words of caution against the entangling of the secular independence movement with the religious elements of the Khilafat movement were not heeded; later on, he became a key leader of the Pakistan Movement. Critics, however, argue that the Khilafat movement was not nationalist or anti-imperialist, but rather that its religious rhetoric concealed a weak and uncertain religious agenda.

Omair Anas, writing for the Turkish outlet Daily Sabah, noted that "It is impossible to recall Turkey's anti-colonial struggle without mentioning Gandhi's support for the unity and integrity of the then-crumbling Ottoman Empire."

== See also ==
- Nawab Mohammad Ismail Khan
- Moplah Riots
- Pakistan Movement
- Progressive Writers' Movement
- Majlis-e-Ahrar-ul-Islam
- Maulana Shaukat Ali
- Nehru Report
- Chauri Chaura incident
- All-India Muslim League
