= Mohamed Ismail =

Mohamed Ismail may refer to:

- Mohamed Ismail (judge), Egyptian judge and politician
- Mohamed Ismail (basketball), Egyptian basketball player
- Mohamed Ismail (footballer) (born 1999), Egyptian footballer
- Mohamed Ismaïl, Moroccan film director

== See also ==
- Ismail Mohamed (disambiguation)
- Muhammad Ismail (disambiguation)
