= Abdul Sattar Khan Niazi =

Pakistani religious leader and politician (1915-2001)

Maulānā Abdus Sattar Khan Niazi
- مولاناعبدالستارخان نیازی
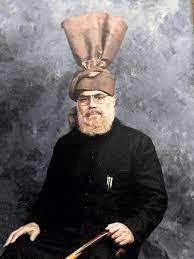

Member of the National Assembly of Pakistan
- In office 3 November 1990 – 18 July 1993
- Constituency: NA-53 (Mianwali-I)
- In office 30 November 1988 – 6 August 1990
- Constituency: NA-53 (Mianwali-I)

Personal details
- Born: 1 October 1915 Isakhel, British Indian Empire
- Died: 2 May 2001 (aged 85) Mianwali, Pakistan
- Party: Jamiat Ulema-e-Pakistan; All-Pakistan Awami League; Muslim League

Abdus Sattar Khan Niazi (مولاناعبدالستارخان نیازی) (1 October 1915 – 2 May 2001) was a Pakistani religious and political leader and a Pakistan Movement activist. He was also a poet, his na'at "Is Karam Ka Karon Shukar Kaise" having been sung by Nusrat Fateh Ali Khan.

== Early life ==
He was born on 1 October 1915 at Isakhel in Mianwali District, Punjab, British India. After initial education, he gained religious education in Lahore where he obtained his master's degree from Islamia College, Lahore in 1940.

== Professional life ==
Niazi became the Dean of Islamic Studies at his alma mater until 1947, and joined then active politics.

Niazi vigorously participated in the political struggle for the creation of Pakistan and the Pakistan Movement, and became the President of the Punjab Muslim Students Federation in 1938. He then served as the President of the Provincial (Punjab) Muslim League until the creation of Pakistan in 1947. He was considered among the trusted companions of both Muhammad Iqbal and Muhammad Ali Jinnah.

He was briefly arrested along with Abul Ala Maududi by the Pakistan Army for purportedly inciting the Lahore riots of 1953 against the Ahmadiyya. Both Maududi and Abdul Sattar Niazi were then sentenced to death by a military court but later released.

According to Dawn newspaper, "Capital punishment being irreversible, no remedy is available if a person's innocence is established after his execution. One shudders to imagine what might have happened if the sentence of death awarded to Maulana Maudoodi and Maulana Abdul Sattar Niazi by a military court in 1953 had been promptly carried out. Fears of miscarriage of justice have persuaded most sensible Muslim scholars to follow the dictum that it is better to let a culprit walk free than hang an innocent person".

He worked as the Secretary General of the Central Jamiat Ulema-e-Pakistan, a Sunni Barelvi political party from 1973 to 1989 and was elected as the President of the Central Jamiat Ulema-e-Pakistan in 1989. and for his political works in Mianwali District, people give him a Title of Mujahid e Millat after his death in 2001.

Maulana Abdul Sattar Khan Niazi was a respected leader and a powerful politician in Mianwali District. He earned the title of Mujahid e Millat for his dedication and service to his party and his people.

== Political career ==
Abdul Sattar Khan Niazi served as a member of Provincial Assembly of the Punjab, Lahore from 1947 to 1949.

He was elected member of the National Assembly of Pakistan twice, in 1988 and 1990.

He was elected to the Senate of Pakistan in 1994 for a six years term.

== Death and legacy ==
Abdul Sattar Khan Niazi died in 2001. Niazi never married and had no children.
