= Abdul Qadir Ludhianvi =

Punjabi Muslim revolutionary during 1857 rebellion

Maulana Abdul Qadir Ludhianvi (died 1860) was among the first Great Ulama of Islam to lead a rebellion in eastern Punjab, in Ludhiana, against the British East India Company in the Indian Rebellion of 1857. He was among the leaders who participated in the war with Bahadur Shah Zafar.

== Early life ==
Maulana Abdul Qadir Ludhianvi belonged to Arain tribe of Punjab. He was the father and grand father of the family of Ulema e Ludhiana.

== Rebellion ==
Ludhianvi made his way to Delhi to support Bahadur Shah Zafar. When the First War of Indian Independence erupted, a fatwa was issued against the British rulers, calling upon Muslims and Hindus alike to rise against the colonial power. Among the leading figures who responded was a revolutionary from Punjab, who dedicated his life to the struggle against foreign domination. He gathered a force of local fighters, peasants, artisans, and loyal supporters, uniting them under the common cause of freedom.

His army succeeded in driving the British not only out of Ludhiana but also from the historic city of Panipat, which had long been a battlefield of India’s destiny. From there, he marched towards Delhi, the symbolic heart of Hindustan, to extend his support to Bahadur Shah Zafar, the last Mughal emperor who had been reluctantly declared the leader of the revolt.

In Delhi, he joined hands with General Bakht Khan, who was commanding the rebel forces against the British. Together, they waged intense battles in the streets, especially around Chandni Chowk, the very heart of the capital. The resistance was fierce but costly. In one of the decisive confrontations, his wife fought shoulder to shoulder with him and his men. She, along with seven of his men, attained martyrdom in the flames of battle.

Her body was laid to rest in the courtyard of the historic Fatehpuri Mosque in Delhi.

== Death ==
After the failure of 1857 rebellion, he made his way back and stayed in a village near Ludhiana called Sutlana for a while. The British army chased Maulana back to the village. The Muslim tribes opposed the British forces allowing him to escape to nearby forests. He died in 1860 on his way to Ludhiana.
