= Punjab Disturbances Court of Inquiry =

Court inquiry into political turmoil around Ahmadiyya

On 19 June 1953 a Court of Inquiry was established to look into disturbances in the Punjab, Pakistan caused by agitation against the Ahmadiyya minority group. The disturbances prompted Martial law to be declared and dozens were killed by the military in the process of their quelling. The inquiry into the disturbances commenced on 1 July 1953. Evidence was concluded on 23 January 1954 and arguments on 28 February 1954. The report was issued 10 April 1954. The inquiry was headed by Chief Justice Muhammad Munir and its report is commonly referred to as the "Munir Report", or "Munir-Kiyani report".

== Disturbances ==
In the beginning of March 1953, widespread disturbances broke out in Punjab, which in some places continued till the middle of April 1953. These took so alarming a turn and assumed such a menacing form that in several places the military had to be called in, and in Lahore martial law had to be proclaimed, which remained in force until the middle of May 1953. Before the declaration of martial law, the police had to resort to firing in several places and at least two persons were killed on the night of 4 March and ten on 5 March. Sixty-six persons more must have been injured in the firing because that number of wounded persons admitted to the Lahore hospitals had gunshot wounds. The number of casualties admitted by the military to have been caused in quelling the disturbances in Lahore was eleven killed and forty-nine wounded. In some other towns there were also a number of casualties caused by firing by the police or the military.

== Causes ==
The disturbances were the direct result of the rejection by Khwaja Nazim-ud-Din, the then Prime Minister of Pakistan, of an ultimatum delivered to him in Karachi on 21 January 1953 by a deputation of the Ulama who had been authorised to do so by the Majlis-e-Amal constituted by the All-Pakistan Muslim Parties Convention held in Karachi from 16 to 18 January 1953. The ultimatum was to the effect that if within a month the Ahmadiyya Muslim Community, also derogatorily known as Qadiani, were not declared a non-Muslim minority and Muhammad Zafarullah Khan, the Foreign Minister who was an Ahmadi Muslim, and other Ahmadis occupying key posts in the State, not removed from their offices, the Majlis-e-Amal would resort to direct action (rast iqdam). At a conference of the Central Ministers and representatives of West Pakistan Provinces held in the early hours of the morning of 27 February it was decided to reject the ultimatum and to arrest the prominent members of Majlis-e-Amal in Karachi and some leaders of the movement in the Punjab. The disturbances commenced immediately after, and as a direct result of, these arrests.

== Court of Inquiry ==
=== Setting up ===
On 19 June 1953, the Governor of the Punjab promulgated Ordinance III of 1953 which, with certain amendments suggested by Muhammad Munir and Malik Rustam Kayani, became the Punjab Disturbances (Public Inquiry) Act, 1953, Punjab Act II of 1954, directing the setting up of a Court for holding a public inquiry into the disturbances. In exercise of the powers given by subsection (1) of section 3 of the Ordinance, the Governor appointed Muhammad Munir and Malik Rustam Kayani members of the Court of Inquiry with the direction to make an inquiry into the disturbances in accordance with the following terms of reference:-

1. the circumstances leading to the declaration of Martial Law in Lahore on 6 March 1953;
2. the responsibility for the disturbances; and
3. the adequacy or otherwise of the measures taken by the Provincial civil authorities to prevent, and subsequently to deal with, the disturbances.

The court of inquiry commenced the inquiry on 1 July 1953 and held 117 sittings of which 92 were devoted to the hearing and recording of evidence. The evidence was concluded on 23 January 1954 and arguments in the case lasted from 1 to 28 February 1954. Five weeks were taken by the court of inquiry to formulate their conclusions and in writing the report.

=== Munir Report ===
The report stated that

"If there is one thing which has been conclusively demonstrated in this inquiry, it is that provided you can persuade the masses to believe that something they are asked to do is religiously right or enjoined by religion, you can set them to any course of action, regardless of all considerations of discipline, loyalty, decency, morality or civic sense."

It hinted "at the undesirability of the confluence of religion and state in Pakistan even for the purpose of binding its disparate ethnic elements together."

However, according to Islamist professor Anis Ahmed, the report has been "condemned by the ulama" (Islamic scholars), "as a biased work".
