= Syed Ata-ul-Mohsin Bukhari =

Pakistani politician (1939–1999)

Syed Ata-ul-Mohsin Bukhari (سید عطاء المحسن بخاری) (also known as Mohsin E Ahrar, 21 January 1939 – 21 November 1999) was as a Pakistani leader of Majlis-e-Ahrar-e-Islam. He was the son of Syed Ata Ullah Shah Bukhari and a Muslim Hanafischolar, religious and political leader.

== Early life ==
Bukhari was born in Amritsar on 21 January 1939.

== Oratory and poetry ==
He was known for his intention. He was also a poet and most of his linguists were published in Monthly Naqeeb E Khatm E Nabuwat

== Death ==
Syed Ata Ul Mohsin Bukhari died on 21 November 1999 in Multan. In the age of 63 years he was buried in Multan near his father's (Syed Ata Ullah Shah Bukhari) and mother's grave.

== Books ==
Bukhari wrote on Islamic teachings, the history of religious movements, and contemporary social issues facing Muslims. Notable books include:

- مجلس احرار کی خدمات, The Services of Majlis-e-Ahrar — a detailed account of the contributions and sacrifices of the Majlis-e-Ahrar-e-Islam in the freedom movement.
- میرے والد کی جدوجہد, My Father's Struggle — memoirs about the life and mission of his father, Syed Ata Ullah Shah Bukhari.
- اسلام اور موجودہ دور, Islam and the Present Age — essays discussing how Islamic principles can be applied to modern challenges.
- تحریک ختم نبوت کا پس منظر, Background of the Khatm-e-Nubuwwat Movement — an analysis of the movement to uphold the belief in the finality of Prophethood.
