= Janbaz Mirza =

Pakistani Journalist

- جانباز مرزا
- Born: Pakistan
- Occupations: writer, poet, journalist

Janbaz Mirza (born Mirza Ghulam Nabi Janbaz) was a writer, poet, and journalist from Pakistan. He played a role in the Pakistan Movement and was the leader and official historian of the Majlis-e-Ahrar-ul-Islam party, which he joined in 1932. After the partition of India in 1947, he started to publish the weekly newspaper Tabsarah. He wrote Karvan-e-Ahrar, an eight-volume series of the history of the Indian subcontinent.

== Writings ==
- Janbaz Mirza (1970). Hayat-e-Ameer-e-Shariat.
- Janbaz Mirza. Karwan-e-Ahraar.
- Janbaz Mirza. Tareekh Azadi-e-Barr-e-Sagheer.
- Janbaz Mirza (1964). Tabsara Jild 5 Sh. 12 Oct. 1964 Shumara Number-012.
- Janbaz Mirza (1964). Tabsara Jild 6 Sh. 1 Nov. 1964 Shumara Number-001.
- Janbaz Mirza (1964). Tabsara Jild 6 Sh. 2 Dec. 1964 Shumara Number-002.
- Janbaz Mirza (1965). Tabsara Jild 6 Sh. 3 Jan.-Feb. 1965 Shumara Number-003.

== See also ==
- List of Pakistani journalists
