= Syed Ata Ullah Shah Bukhari =

Islamic scholar (1892–1961)

Shah Jee Syed Ata Ullah Shah Bukhari
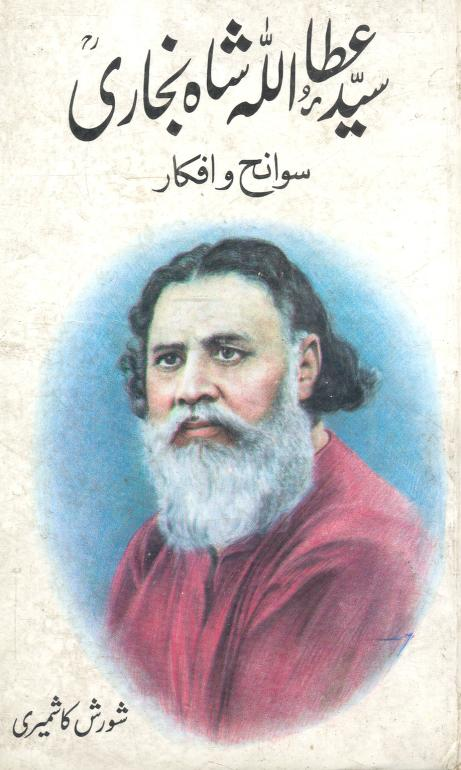

President of Majlis-e-Ahrar-ul-Islam
- In office 29 December 1929 – 1930
- In office 1946–1948

1st Emir of Aalmi Majlis Tahaffuz Khatm-e-Nubuwwat
- In office 1954–1961
- Preceded by: None (office created)
- Succeeded by: Qazi Ahsan Ahmed Shuja Abadi

Personal life
- Born: Syed Ata Ullah Shah; 23 November 1892 Patna, Bengal Presidency, British India
- Died: 21 August 1961 (aged 68) Multan, West Pakistan, Pakistan
- Resting place: Multan, Punjab, Pakistan
- Children: Syed Abuzar Bukhari; Syed Ata-ul-Mohsin Bukhari; Syed Ata-ul-Muhaimin Bukhari; Syed Ata-ul-Momin Bukhari
- Citizenship: British Indian (1892–1947); Pakistani (1947–1961)
- Political party: Majlis-e-Ahrar-ul-Islam
- Other name: Shah jee
- Occupation: Khatabat; orator; poet; political activist; historian; Islamic scholar
- Website: www ahrar.org.pk

Religious life
- Religion: Islam
- Denomination: Sunni
- Jurisprudence: Hanafi

Muslim leader
- Influenced by: Hafiz Syed Ziauddin (Father) Anwar Shah Kashmiri
- Influenced: Ilm Deen

Syed Ata Ullah Shah Bukhari (Urdu سید عطاء اللہ شاہ بخاری) (23 September 1892 – 21 August 1961), was a Hanafi Islamic scholar and a Religio-political figure from the Indian subcontinent. He was one of the Majlis-e-Ahrar-e-Islam's founding members. His biographer, Agha Shorish Kashmiri, states that Bukhari's greatest contribution had been his germination of strong anti-British feelings among the Indian Muslims.

He is one of the most notable leaders of the Ahrar movement which was associated with opposition to Muhammad Ali Jinnah and opposition to the establishment of an independent Pakistan, as well as opposition to the Ahmadiyya Movement.

He is considered as a legendary rhetoric, which made him famous among the Muslims.

== Birth and education ==
Born in Patna, British India, in 1892, to a Punjabi speaking Father from village Nagrian; Gujrat Pakistan and Bihari mother . he received his early religious education in what is now Gujrat, Pakistan and learned the Qur'an by heart from his father Hafiz Syed Ziauddin. He migrated to Amritsar in 1914 when he was 22 years old. He completed his early education by subscribing to a purist view of Islam. Although Bukhari did not subscribe to the Deobandi movement, he was influenced by some Deobandi scholars, including Mahmud Hasan Deobandi.

Bukhari began his career as a religious preacher in a small mosque in Amritsar, and taught the Quran for the next 40 years. He shared friendship with a section of socialists and communists but did not accept their ideology completely. He was ‘imbued with a brilliant exposition of romantic socialism, and led Muslims to a restlessness activism'. He studied the Sahih Bukhari in jail when he was imprisoned for an anti-government religious speech.

== Religious and political career ==
He started his religious and political career in 1916. His speeches graphically portrayed the sorrows and sufferings of the poor, and would promise his audience that the end of their sufferings would come about with the end of British rule. As the first step of his political career, he began to participate in the movements of the Indian National Congress in 1921 from Kolkata where he delivered a loaded speech and was arrested on 27 March 1921 because of that speech. He became an eyesore to the administration, and an official view about him said: Ata Ullah Shah is a man, who it is better to lock up in jail, away from Congress leaders than to parley with. He has spent a considerable part of his life preaching sedition. He is an amusing speaker, who can influence a crowd. After Nehru report Bukhari created All India Majlis-e-Ahrar-e-Islam with Mazhar Ali Azhar, Chaudhry Afzal Haq, Habib-ur-Rehman Ludhianvi, Hissam-ud-Din, Master Taj-ud-Din Ansari and Zafar Ali Khan on 29 December 1929. Later on the prominent Barelvi orator Syed Faiz-ul Hassan Shah also joined them. He was also the founding father of Majlis-e-Ahrar, Indian nationalist Muslim political movement in India. In 1943, Ahrar passed a resolution opposing the partition of India and "introduced a sectarian element into its objections by portraying Jinnah as an infidel in an attempt to discredit his reputation." He led a movement against Ahmadis and held an Ahrar Tableegh Conference at Qadian in 21–23 October 1934. Bukhari was a central figure in the Khatme Nabuwwat Movement of 1953, which demanded that government of Pakistan declare the Qadianis as non-Muslims.

== Oratory and poetry ==
He became known for his oratory. He was also a poet and most of his poetry was in Persian. His poetic verses were compiled by his eldest son Syed Abuzar Bukhari in 1956 under the name of Sawati-ul-ilham.

== Death ==
Bukhari died on 21 August 1961. He is buried in Multan, Pakistan. on Tareen Road Children Complex.

== Books ==
Syed Ata Ullah Shah Bukhari's speeches, sermons, and writings have been compiled into several books and collections, reflecting his powerful oratory, deep knowledge of Islamic theology, and unwavering opposition to colonialism and sectarianism. Notable books (and compilations of his work) include:

- خطباتِ بخاری, The Sermons of Bukhari — a collection of his famous sermons and speeches delivered across India.
- احرار کا پیغام, The Message of the Ahrar — his speeches and writings on the ideology and mission of the Majlis-e-Ahrar-e-Islam.
- خطبے اور مقالات, Speeches and Essays — selected addresses and articles covering religion, politics, and social reform.
- یادگارِ بخاری, Memorial to Bukhari — a posthumous compilation of his sayings, poetry, and biographical sketches.
- قادیانیت کی حقیقت, The Reality of Qadianism — his critiques of the Ahmadiyya movement, reflecting his prominent role in the Khatm-e-Nubuwwat movement.

== Sources ==
- Yaqoob, Hafiz Sajid; Amjad, Muhammad (2021). "Role of Syed Atta Ullah Shah Bukhari in the Religious Movements of Sub-Continent (Analytical Study)". Malakand University Research Journal of Islamic Studies (in Urdu). 3 (2): 99–114. ISSN 2708-6577.
- Syed Ata ullah shah bukhari ka aqeeda-e-khatm-e-nubuwwat
- Syed Ata Ullah Shah Bukhaqri ka khitab (Nawai-waqt Newspaper)
- Column of Nawabzada Nasrullah Khan
- Column of Professor Khalid Shibbir Ahmad
- Agha Shorish Kashmiri. Syed Ata Ullah Shah Bukhari.
- Janbaz Mirza. Hayat-e-Ameer-e-Shariat.
- Syed-ul-Ahrar, Ameer-e-Shariat, Khateeb-ul-Hind, Maulana Ata Ullah Shah Bukhari (rehmatullah-e-allaih
- Syed Ata Ullah Shah Bukhari ki zindagi (Nawai-waqt Column)
