= Chaudhry Afzal Haq =

Islamic scholar and writer (1891–1942)

- چوہدری افضل حق

2nd President of Majlis-i Ahrar-i Islam
- In office 1931–1934
- Preceded by: Ataulla Bukari
- Succeeded by: Habibur Rehman Ludhianvi

Personal details
- Born: 1891 Hoshiarpur, British India
- Died: 8 January 1942 (aged 50–51) Lahore, British India
- Children: 7

Religious life
- Religion: Islam
- Denomination: Sunni
- Jurisprudence: Hanafi
- Creed: Maturidi

Chaudhry Afzal Haq (Note: Urdu: چوہدری افضل حق) (1891–8 January 1942) was an Islamic scholar and writer who served as the second president of Majlis-i Ahrar-i Islam from 1931 to 1934.

== Biography ==
A senior political figure in the history of the Indian subcontinent, born in a Rajput Family of Garhshankar he worked to help the poor and unrepresented in the Punjab. He founded Ahrar with Ataulla Bukari. He was elected three times to the Punjab Assembly. He was a Member of the Legislative Assembly of India. His children have since died however his grandchildren, his great-grandchildren and great-great-grandchildren can still be found mostly in Lahore and various other parts of the Punjab province of Pakistan. Some of his descendants have relocated to other places around the globe. He was known as Mufakkir-e-Ahrar "Thinker of the Ahrar Party". He wrote many books such as Zindagi, Mehbub-e-Khuda, Deen-e-Islam, Azadi-e-Hind, Mera Afsanah, Jawahraat, Mashooqa-e-Punjab, Shaoor, Dehati rooman, Pakistan and untouchability, Taareekh-e-Ahrar, Dunya may dozakh, Islam and Socialism, etc. He died on 8 January 1942, in Lahore.
