= Abuzar Bukari =

Pakistani politician

- Died: 24 October 1995 Multan, Punjab, Pakistan
- Parent: Syed Ata Ullah Shah Bukhari (father)

Religious life
- Religion: Islam

Syed Abu Moavia Abuzar Bukari (Note: Urdu: سید ابو معاویہ ابوذر بخاری) (died 24 October 1995) was a Pakistani Islamic scholar and writer who served as the eighth president of the Majlis-i Ahrar-i Islam, first from 1975 to 1979, and then from 1993 to 1994.

== Biography ==
Bukari was the elder son of Ataulla Bukhari and a leader of the Majlis, being elected multiple times as President or Secretary General of the Ahrar Party. Bukhari was also founder of Majlis-e-Khuddam-e-sahabah and had an important role in Tehreek-e-Khatme Nabuwwat 1953, 1974 and 1984.

Bukhari assembled a conference in 1962 on the day of the death of Mu'awiya I at Qasim Bagh Multan. On multiple occasions, Bukhari was arrested over delivering anti-government religious and political speeches. He was also editor of the monthly news corporation, Al-Ahrar published from Lahore and Multan. Bukhari was also a poet; his PhD thesis has been written on his Persian book Kaan Parsi in Iran.

== Death ==
Bukhari died on 24 October 1995 in Multan. He was buried in Multan near his father's (Syed Ata Ullah Shah Bukhari) grave.

== Books ==
Abuzar Bukhari wrote extensively on Islamic philosophy, social reform, and the political challenges facing Muslims in the Indian subcontinent. Some of his notable works include:

- ابوذر اور اسلام, Abu Dharr and Islam — a study of the life and teachings of Abu Dharr al-Ghifari and their relevance to modern Muslim society.
- تحریک پاکستان اور مسلمان, The Pakistan Movement and the Muslims — an analysis of the role of Muslims in the struggle for an independent homeland.
- اسلامی سیاست کے اصول, Principles of Islamic Politics — outlining the foundations of political thought in Islam.
- مسلمانوں کی موجودہ حالت, The Present Condition of Muslims — a critical look at the social and moral decline of the Muslim community and possible remedies.
