= Master Taj-ud-Din Ansari =

Politician

Master Taj-ud-Din Ansari was a figure in the history of Indian subcontinent and a leader of All India Majlis-e-Ahrar-ul-Islam. After the partition of India he left politics and struggle for Khatm-e-Nubuwwat movement with Syed Ata Ullah Shah Bukhari, chief of Majlis-e-Ahrar-e-Islam Pakistan. In 1953 he had a role in the movement of Tehreek-e-Khatme Nabuwwat. In 1958, the Ahrar organized again. At that time, Master Taj-ud-Din Ansari was elected for the president seat of All Pakistan Majlis-e-Ahrar-e-Islam.
