= Majlis-e Ahrar-e Islam =

Former Muslim organisation in the Indian subcontinent

Majlis-e-Ahrar-e-Islam
- مجلسِ احرارِ اسلام

- Flag of Majlis-e-Ahrar
- Formation: 29 December 1929 (96 years ago)
- Founder: Syed Ata Ullah Shah Bukhari; Dawood Ghaznavi
- Type: Religious organisation
- Purpose: Finality of Prophethood; Hukumat-e Ilahiyya; Pakistani nationalism
- Headquarters: Ahrar Central Secretariat. 69-C, New Muslim Town, Wahdat Road, Lahore, Pakistan
- Secretary General: Abdul Latif Khalid Cheema
- President: Syed Muhammad Kafeel Bukhari
- Central & Senior Vice-President: Professor Khalid Shabbir Ahmad; Malik Muhammad Yousuf
- Central preacher: Maulana Muhammad Mugheera
- Central Information Secretary: Dr. Umar Farooq Ahrar
- Affiliations: Tehreek-e Talaba-e-Islam; Ahrar Students Federation (ASF)
- Website: ahrarindia.com www.ahrar.org.pk

Majlis-e Ahrar-e Islam (Urdu: مجلسِ احرارِ اسلام), also known simply as the Ahrar, is a religious Muslim organisation in the Indian subcontinent that was formed during the British Raj (prior to the Partition of India) on 29 December 1929 at Lahore.

The group became composed of Indian Muslims inspired by and supporting the Khilafat Movement, which cleaved closer to the Congress Party. The organisation was based in Punjab and gathered support from the urban lower-middle class. Chaudhry Afzal Haq, Maulana Habib-ur-Rehman Ludhianvi, Syed Ata Ullah Shah Bukhari Muhammad Ali Jalandhari were the leaders of the organisation.

Religious leaders from all sects Barelvi, Deobandi, Ahle Hadith, Shia Progressive and politically Communists were the members of Majlis-e-Ahrar. Chaudhry Afzal Haq, Syed Ata Ullah Shah Bukhari, Muhammad Ali Jalandhari, Habib-ur-Rehman Ludhianvi, Mazhar Ali Azhar, Zafar Ali Khan and Dawood Ghaznavi were the founders of the organisation. The Ahrar was composed of Indian Muslims disillusioned by the Khilafat Movement, which cleaved closer to the Congress Party.

The organisation, being a member of the All India Azad Muslim Conference, is associated with opposition to Muhammad Ali Jinnah and establishment of an independent Pakistan. Syed Faiz-ul Hassan Shah was the only ahrari leader who actively participated in the Pakistan independence movement.

After 1947, it separated into the Majlis-e-Ahrar Islam Hind (مجلس احرارلأسلام ہند), based in Ludhiana and led by descendants of Maulana Habib-ur-Rehman Ludhianvi, as well as the Majlis-e-Ahrar-e-Islam (مجلس احرارلأسلام اسلام), based in Lahore and led by descendants of Syed Ata Ullah Shah Bukhari.

== History and activities ==
=== Ideology and philosophy ===
Majlis-e-Ahrar-ul-Islam or simply called 'Ahrars' had an anti-imperialist, anti-feudal and Indian nationalist ideology. It worked to free India from the British rule. This party, before fading away, was highly active in Punjab Province (British India) and left an impact on major cities of Punjab like Amritsar, Lahore, Sialkot, Multan, Ludhiana and Gurdaspur.

The Majlis-e-Ahrar-e-Islam, was originally part of the failed Khilafat movement and emerged as a religio-political party after the Jallianwala Bagh massacre of 1919 and the disintegration of the Khilafat movement in 1922.

Syed Ata Ullah Shah Bukhari presided over the meeting and Maulana Mazhar Ali Azhar delivered the manifesto of an All India Majlis-e-Ahrar-e-Islam. It became first line offending party against Ahmadi Muslims by declaring that their objectives were to guide the Muslims of India on matters of nationalism as well as religion. Ahrar spearheaded the movement to have Ahmadi Muslims officially declared as non-Muslims.

By the early 1930s, the Majlis-e-Ahrar-e-Islam (hereafter called Ahrars) had become an important political party of Muslims in the Punjab. The activists' agitation centered on the princely states, and was predicated on mobilisation around socio-religious issues. Besides these campaigns, the Ahrar also participated in the mainstream political developments of British India between 1931 and 1947. Its political career can be divided into two parts; the AHRAR's response to political and constitutional issues, and its performance in electoral politics.

The Majlis-e-Ahrar-ul-Islam stood strongly against the partition of India, with its leader Afzal Haq stating that the "Partition of India is, in fact, the cry of upper classes …. It is not a communal demand as some people think but a stunt in order that the poor classes may not concentrate their thought and energies on all important questions of social and economic justice." It was a member of the All India Azad Muslim Conference, which gathered to show support for a united India.

=== Activism in Pakistan ===
Syed Muhammad Kafeel Bukhari is present President Of Majlis Ahrar Islam Pakistan. In November 2012, the Government of Pakistan banned Abdul Latif Khalid Cheema, leader of Tehreek-e-Khatme Nabuwwat and Secretary General of Majlis-e-Ahrar-e-Islam, from delivering a speech in the Chichawatni and district Sahiwal area due to the security situation in Muharram. In Pakistan, the party opposed the Ahmadiyya Movement. This culminated in the 1953 Lahore riots; in 1954, Majlis-e-Ahrar was banned. The associated Islamist religious movement Tehreek-e-Khatme Nabuwwat remains.

== List of organisation leaders ==
- Syed Ata Ullah Shah Bukhari, founder, 1st president
- Chaudhry Afzal Haq, co-founder, 2nd president, Member of the Legislative Assembly, 1934–1942
- Mazhar Ali Azhar, co-founder, secretary General, Member of the Legislative Assembly, 1934–1942
- Habib-ur-Rehman Ludhianvi, third President, 1942–1944
- Syed Muhammad Kafeel Bukhari, President
- Professor Khalid Shabbir Ahmad, Vice president
- Abdul Latif Khalid Cheema, vice President.
- Muhammad Mughira General Secretary
- Dr Omar Farooq Ahrar, Secretary Information,
- Master Taj-ud-Din Ansari
- Sheikh Hissam-ud-Din
- Agha Shorish Kashmiri
- Janbaz Mirza, official Ahrar historian

== Notable members and leaders ==
=== Presidents ===
- Syed Ata Ullah Shah Bukhari, founder and first President, 1929–1930, 1946–1948
- Chaudhry Afzal Haq, second President, 1931–1934 Member of the Legislative Assembly
- Habib-ur-Rehman Ludhianvi, third President, 1935–1939
- Sheikh Hissam-ud-Din, 1939–1940, 1942–1946, 1962–1966
- Master Taj-ud-Din Ansari, 1948–1952
- Ghulam Ghaus Hazarvi, 1958
- Ubaid Ullah Ahrar, 1966–1974
- Syed Abuzar Bukhari, 1975–1978, 1993–1994
- Malik Abdul Ghafur Anwari, 1979–1980
- Mirza Muhammad Hassan Chughtai, 1981–1992
- Abdul Haq Chauhan, 1995–1997
- Syed Ata-ul-Mohsin Bukhari, 1998–1999
- Syed Ata-ul-Muhaimin Bukhari, President 1999–2021 president of Majlis-e-Ahrar-e-Islam, Pakistan
- Syed Muhammad Kafeel Bukhari, President 2021–present

=== Secretaries general ===
- Maulana Dawood Ghaznavi, founder, 1st Secretary General, 1929–1932
- Maulana Mazhar Ali Azhar, founder, 2nd Secretary General, 1932–1933, 1933–1938, 1941–1945 Member of the Legislative Assembly
- Agha Shorish Kashmiri, 1939–1940, 1945 secretary Ahrar Punjab
- Nawabzada Nasrullah Khan, 1946–1947
- Sheikh Hissam-ud-Din, 1948–1953
- Syed Abuzar Bukhari, 1962–1963, 1965–1973
- Janbaz Mirza, 1964–1965
- Chaudhry Sana Ullah Bhutta, 1973–1974
- Syed Ata-ul-Mohsin Bukhari, 1975–1983, 1990–1995
- Abdul Aleem Raipuri Shaheed, 1984–1986
- Syed Ata-ul-Momin Bukhari, 1987–1989
- Ishaq Saleemi, 1990–1995
- Professor Khalid Shabbir Ahmad, 1998–2008
- Abdul Latif Khalid Cheema, 2008–2011, 2012–present

=== Other ===
- Janbaz Mirza, journalist
- Muhammad Ismail Zabeeh, Secretary, Punjab, 1937
- Syed Faiz-ul Hassan Shah, scholar
- Haji Abdul Jabar Khan Abbottabad NWFP

== See also ==
- List of Deobandi organisations
