= Al-Hilal (newspaper) =

Weekly language in India (1912–1914)

- Type: Weekly newspaper
- Founder: Maulana Abul Kalam Azad
- Editor: Maulana Abul Kalam Azad
- Founded: 1912
- Ceased publication: 1914 (shut down by the then British government)
- Political alignment: Indian nationalism
- Language: Urdu

Al-Hilal (Urdu: هلال "The Crescent") was a weekly Urdu language newspaper established by the Indian Muslim independence activist and first education minister of India Maulana Abul Kalam Azad. The paper was notable for its criticism of the British Raj in India and its exhortation to Indian Muslims to join the growing Indian independence movement. Al-Hilal ran from 1912 to 1914, when it was shut down under the Press Act.

== Background ==
Al-Hilal followed several earlier forays into publishing by Azad. His earliest attempt was Nairang-e-Alam, a poetry periodical published in 1899 when he was 11 years old, followed by Al-Misbah, a current events periodical published in 1900, and Lisan-us Sidq ("The Voice of Truth") in 1904. Azad also contributed to journals like Khadang-i-Nazar, Makhzan, and Al-Nadva.

In 1908, Azad embarked on travels through several Muslim countries in Asia and Africa and was exposed to anti-imperial movements in Iraq, Turkey, and Egypt. He became particularly close with Egyptian activist Mustafa Kamil Pasha and was inspired by his active and explicit dissent against British authorities in Egypt. Al-Hilal was named after the publication with the same title published in Egypt, pointing to the influence of Egyptian anti-imperial activists on Azad's thinking.

== 1912 to 1914 ==
The first edition of Al-Hilal was published in Calcutta in 1912. According to British authorities at the time, Al-Hilal was at odds with the majority of the Muslim press in India, which they claimed was largely pro-government. Al-Hilal was often mentioned in British reports alongside The Comrade, a newspaper established by the Indian Muslim scholar Muhammad Ali. While The Comrade and Al-Hilal shared a critical view of British imperialism, The Comrade was an English-language publication targeted at British-educated Muslims, while Al-Hilal was an Urdu-language publication.

Along with critical coverage of the British government, Al-Hilal also covered issues related to theology, war, and science. Its politics centered around complete freedom from British rule, with a notable emphasis on the importance of Hindu-Muslim unity. It was only openly disapproving of the Muslim League, which Azad claimed had "betrayed the people." Additionally, Al-Hilal reflected Azad's pan-Islamic approach to anti-imperialism and often included news about anti-imperial struggles among Muslim populations in other parts of Asia and Africa. For example, during the Balkan War, Al-Hilal published photos of Turkish independence activists and compared British activities in Turkey with British attitudes towards the destruction of the Kanpur mosque in India. In his writing, Azad drew from Islamic theology and the Quran in order to contextualize the Indian independence struggle for his Muslim readership.

Over the course of its two-year run, Al-Hilal established itself as an extremely popular newspaper in the Indian Muslim community. Its readership spanned Bengal, the United Provinces, and Punjab. By Azad's own account, the newspaper had devoted readers in Afghanistan as well. At the time, Al-Hilal's peak circulation of over 25,000 marked a record for Urdu journalism, and back issues were regularly republished due to high demand.

== Shutdown in 1914 ==
British authorities regularly expressed concerns about Al-Hilal's hostile attitude towards the colonial government, and monitored it closely throughout its run. The newspaper was notorious enough that it was mentioned at a 1915 meeting of the House of Commons, where British leaders specifically drew attention to Al-Hilal's apparent "anti-British and pro-German" stance and its publication of an article that stated that the British Army "prefer[red] retreating to fighting."

In 1914, Azad was fined Rs. 2000 under the Press Act, which allowed for the censorship of Indian publications promoting nationalist views. Once he had paid the initial fine, he was fined a further Rs. 10,000. Al-Hilal was finally forcibly shut down by British authorities in November 1914.

Azad attempted to revive Al-Hilal as Al-Balagh ("The Message") in 1915, but the new newspaper only lasted five months. He tried again to establish a new newspaper with Paigham in 1921, but the paper was banned by December 1921 and Azad was arrested for his continued refusal to comply with the Press Act.

== Impact and legacy ==
Al-Hilal is widely considered to be a major turning point in Muslim engagement with the independence movement, inspiring a new community resistance to the British Raj. Several prominent independence activists acknowledged the importance of Azad's work with the newspaper, even after its shutdown. In a 1920 edition of his publication Young India, Mahatma Gandhi highlighted the importance of Al-Hilal's critique of the British government. Similarly, in his 1944 book The Discovery of India, Jawaharlal Nehru praised Azad for the political and literary innovations he pioneered with Al-Hilal, stating that:

Abul Kalam Azad spoke in a new language to them [the Indian Muslim population] in his weekly Al-Hilal. It was not only a new language in thought and approach, even its texture was different, for Azad's style was tense and virile, though a little difficult because of its Persian background. He used new phrases for new ideas and was a definite influence in giving shape to the Urdu language, as it is today. The older conservative leaders among the Muslims did not react favourably to all this and criticized Azad's opinions and approach. Yet not even the most learned of them could easily meet Azad in debate and argument, even on the basis of scripture and old tradition, for Azad's knowledge of the happened to be greater than theirs.

In 1921, Mufti Shaukat Ali Fehmi purchased the press that Azad had used to publish Al-Hilal to establish his own Urdu-language magazine, Din Dunia. The press continued to be used for almost five decades to publish Urdu publications. While the Fehmi family attempted to have the press preserved in recognition of its historical significance, they received little interest from any universities, museums, or government agencies, and it was eventually sold for scrap.
