= Amjadi Bano =

Indian Independence activist

Amjadi Bano Begum

Member of the Uttar Pradesh Legislative Council
- In office 1946 – 28 March 1947

Personal details
- Born: 1885 Rampur
- Died: 28 March 1947 (aged 61–62) Bombay, India
- Spouse: Mohammad Ali Jauhar (m. 1902)
- Relations: Abadi Bano Begum (mother-in-law)
- Children: 4

Amjadi Bano (1885-28 March 1947) also known as Amjadi Bano Begum was an Indian revolutionary, freedom fighter, politician and journalist. She was married to Maulana Muhammad Ali Jauhar. She was the lone women in the first working committee of the Muslim League.

She also attended the First Round Table Conference in London. She established Roznama Hind, an Urdu daily to spread the message of freedom. She was elected unopposed for a seat in Uttar Pradesh in the general elections of 1946.

== Early life ==
Bano was born in 1885 to Azmat Ali Khan, a high official of Rampur State, and received primary education at her home.

== Personal life ==
Bano was married to Muhammad Ali Jauhar, her cousin, at the age of 17 in 1902. She started her career in activism with her husband and Bi Amma, her mother-in-law.

They had four daughters, two of them dying at 19.

== Death and legacy ==
Bano died on 28 March 1947 and was buried at Khilafat House, Bombay (now Mumbai).

Mahatma Gandhi, in his Young India of 29 November 1921, wrote a special article about her entitled 'A Brave Woman'.
