= The Comrade =

Weekly English-language Indian newspaper (1911-14)

The Comrade was a weekly English-language newspaper that was published and edited by Mohammad Ali Jauhar between 1911 and 1914.

Mohammad Ali was a forceful orator and writer, contributing articles to various newspapers including The Times, The Observer and The Manchester Guardian before he launched The Comrade. Produced on expensive paper, The Comrade quickly gained circulation and influence becoming famous even internationally, securing subscribers in several foreign countries. The paper, launched from Calcutta, shifted to Delhi, the newly announced capital of the Raj, in 1912 where the first issue of the Delhi edition appeared on 12 October. In 1913, in order to reach out to the Muslim masses, he started an Urdu daily, the Hamdard.

== Aims and editorial stance ==
Mohammad Ali was a member and senior leader of the Muslim League and The Comrade often voiced that party's political line. Ali wrote a series of articles in his paper criticising the annulment of the Partition of Bengal in 1911 and criticised papers such as The Tribune, Surendranath Banerjee's The Bengalee and others that were opposed to the League and the Aligarh school of politics. In its inaugural edition of 14 January 1911, the paper outlined “the frank recognition of yawning differences that divide” Hindus and Muslims. Nevertheless, The Comrade advocated Hindu-Muslim entente, and called on both communities to work together for the national cause.

Ali aimed to create national and global networks of support for Muslim causes through The Comrade. It carried several articles that highlighted the plight of Muslims globally during important international events of the time such as the Balkan Wars, the occupation of Egypt by the British and Turkey's role in the First World War. The articles and editorials were particularly scathing of a perceived British hostility to the Muslim world in general and to Turkey in particular. In his Discovery of India, Jawaharlal Nehru observed thus about Ali and his journalistic stance in The Comrade: "The annulment of the Partition of Bengal in 1911 had given him a shock and his faith in the bona fides of the British Government had been shaken. The Balkan Wars moved him and he wrote passionately in favour of Turkey and the Islamic tradition it represented. Progressively he grew more anti-British and the entry of Turkey in World War I completed the process"

With the start of the First World War, the British government became keen that Indians remain loyal to the Allied cause. The British Indian government was particularly concerned about Muslim public opinion and Pan-Islamic activism. They singled out Mohamed Ali and his newspapers for galvanising Muslim sentiment against the British and the Allies during the early period of the First World War.

== Closure and legacy ==
In 1914 Ali wrote, in The Comrade, an article entitled "The Choice of the Turks" in which he listed a series of wrongs that he said had been done against them by the British, but nonetheless advised the Turks to join with the Allies. This article proved to be the undoing for his paper. On 26 September 1914 The Comrade was banned by the colonial authorities, its deposit of Rs. 2,000 forfeited and all copies of the newspaper impounded under the provisions of the Press Act of 1910.

After the withdrawal of the Non-Cooperation Movement and the collapse of the Khilafat Movement in 1922, Ali, who along with his brother Shaukat Ali, had played an important role in them, revived The Comrade and the Hamdard in 1924, using them to preach a message of Hindu-Muslim amity. The Comrade however closed down two years later.

In 1937, the Bengali journalist and freedom fighter Mujibur Rahman Khan founded an English periodical named The Comrade in honour of Maulana Mohammad Ali's eponymous original.
