= Gul Mohamad Zhowandai =

Afghan writer, intellectual and novelist (1905-1988)

Gul Mohammad Zhowandai
- گل محمد ژوندی
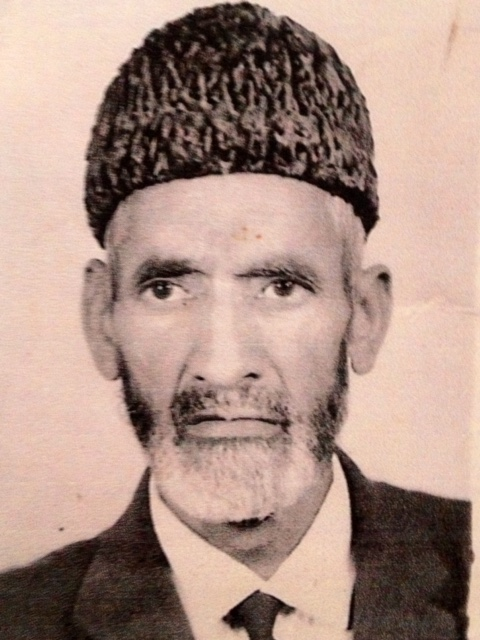
- Born: May 11, 1905; Kabul, Afghanistan
- Died: Kabul, Afghanistan
- Resting place: Shuadaye Saleheen, Kabul
- Occupations: Short story writer, novelist, Poet, Editor
- Writing career
- Language: Persian/Dari
- Notable works: فیروز Firoz, آروزی پر آشوب Chaotic desire, Kachkol, کچکول

Gul Mohamad Zhowandai (Persian: گل محمد ژوندی; May 11, 1905 – 1988) was an Afghan novelist, poet, and editor for several Afghan daily newspapers, including Islah and Anīs.

== Early life ==
Zhowandai was born in Kabul, Afghanistan to Khair Mohamad Khan Popalzai.

== Career ==
During his career as an editor for Afghan newspapers, Zhowandai published short stories and articles which often featured mythical creatures, magical elements, and characters inspired by Afghan folklore. By incorporating traditional storytelling techniques and themes into contemporary narratives, Zhowandai revitalized interest in Afghan folktales and traditions. Throughout his career, Zhowandai received numerous accolades in recognition for his contributions to literature.

His publications were novels written in Persian, and several volumes of inspirational verse. His published works include:

- Ferroz — short stories (Kabul, Afghanistan)
- Ahrezo ah ye per ahshoob — short stories (Kabul, Afghanistan: Islla Publications)
- Kachkol — novel (Kabul, Afghanistan)
- Collection of Poems (Kabul, Afghanistan: Islla, Anis)

In Timeri Murari's novel The Taliban Cricket Club the narrator described Gul as "our most celebrated poet and writer."

== Sources ==
- Modern Fiction In Afghanistan (Taraneh Publication)
- An Encyclopedia of Persian Literature in Afghanistan Vol. 3 (Tehran, 1999)
- Mahseerin Sukhanwar (Kabul, Afghanistan)
- Islah daily Newspaper 1935-1947 Library of Congress scanned Afghanistan printed materials
