= Al-Islah (newspaper) =

Pakistani Urdu-language newspaper

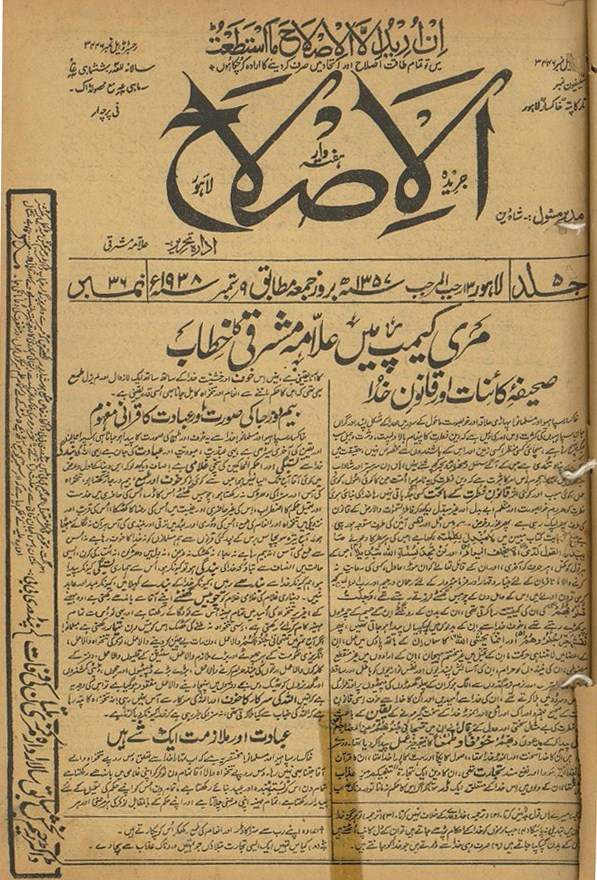
- Al-Islah 1938's edition
- Type: Weekly newspaper
- Format: Broadsheet
- Founder: Inayatullah Khan Mashriqi
- Founded: 1934; 92 years ago
- Ceased publication: 1947
- Language: Urdu
- Headquarters: Lahore, Pakistan

Al-Islah (Urdu: الاصلاح) was an Urdu language official weekly newspaper of the Khaksar movement. It was started in 1934 by the founder of the movement, Allama Mashriqi and continued until it was banned 1947. It was printed and distributed from Lahore, India, and contained Mashriqi's speeches as well as articles that reflected the philosophy and ideology of the Khaksar movement.

On 22 February 1940, the Punjab police raided the printing press of the newspaper and seized the copies of the publications. It was later banned by the government. It primarily used to publish news of the Indian subcontinent following the independence uprisings besides writing political ideology of the movement.
