= Ichhra =

Residential neighborhood in Lahore, Pakistan

Coordinates: 31°34′0″N 74°18′58″E

Ichhra اِچھرا
- Neighbourhood
- Interactive map of Ichhra اِچھرا
- Country: Pakistan
- Province: Punjab
- City: Lahore
- Tehsil: Model Town

Government
  - Type: Union Council

A view of the Ichhra Bazaar (market) at night.

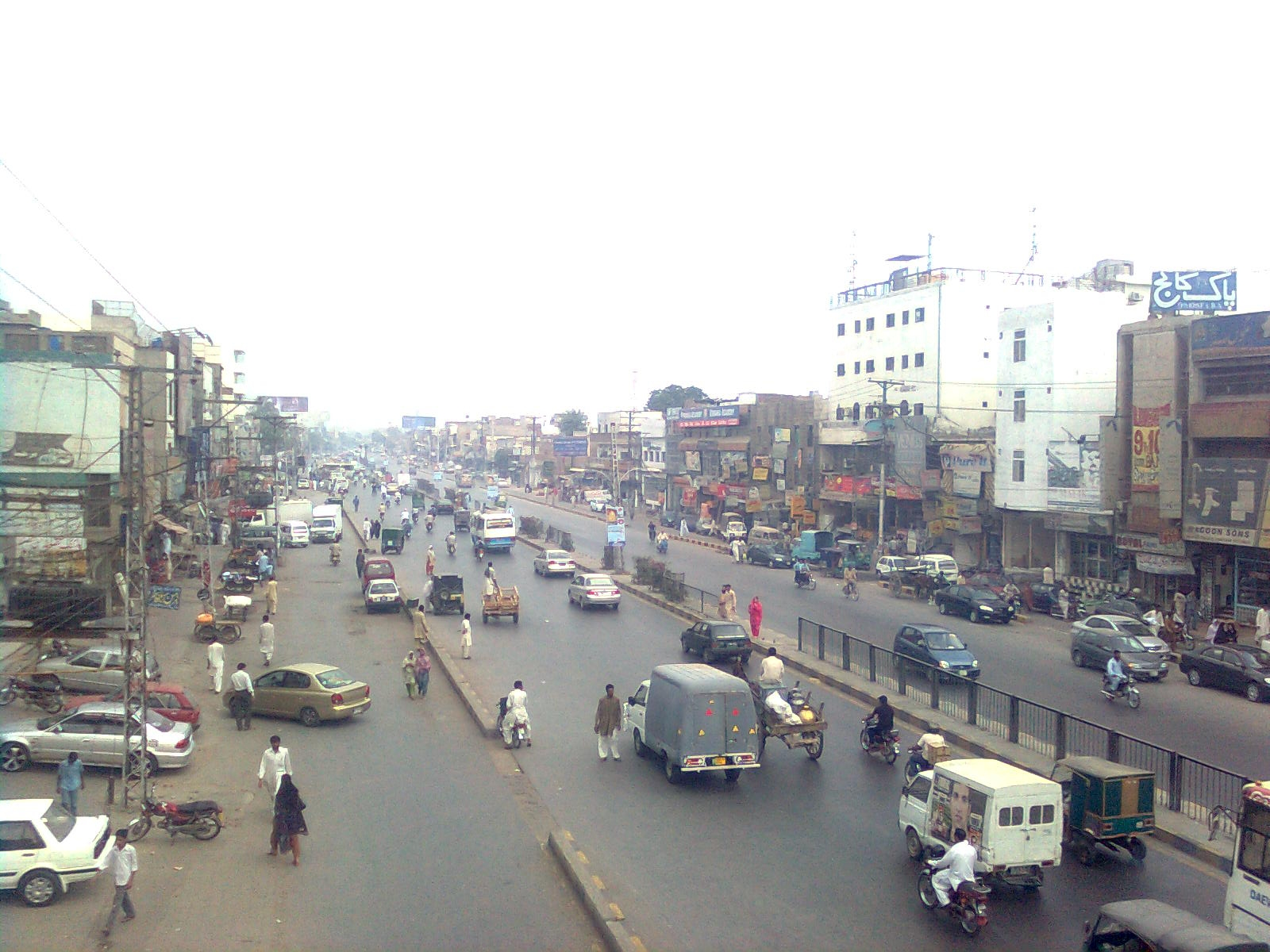
A view of the Ferozpur Road near Ichhra Bazaar.

Ichhra (Punjabi, Urdu: اِچھرا) is a residential and commercial area in Lahore, Punjab, Pakistan.

Being a very old locality, some very old buildings can be seen in Ichhra. It is noted for its Ichhra Bazaar, among the most economical markets of Lahore. This market is known for its traditional and cultural dresses and other handicrafts supplied from all over Punjab, as well as its furniture selection. There is a large Christian community living in Ichhra.

In 1931, Inayatullah Khan Mashriqi known as Allama Mashriqi, launched his Khaksar movement from Ichhra and in 1963, upon his death, Mashriqi was buried here.

Syed Abul A'la Maududi, the Islamic scholar and founder of the Jamaat-e-Islami, also lived in Ichhra.
