= National Education Day (India) =

Designated Day in India

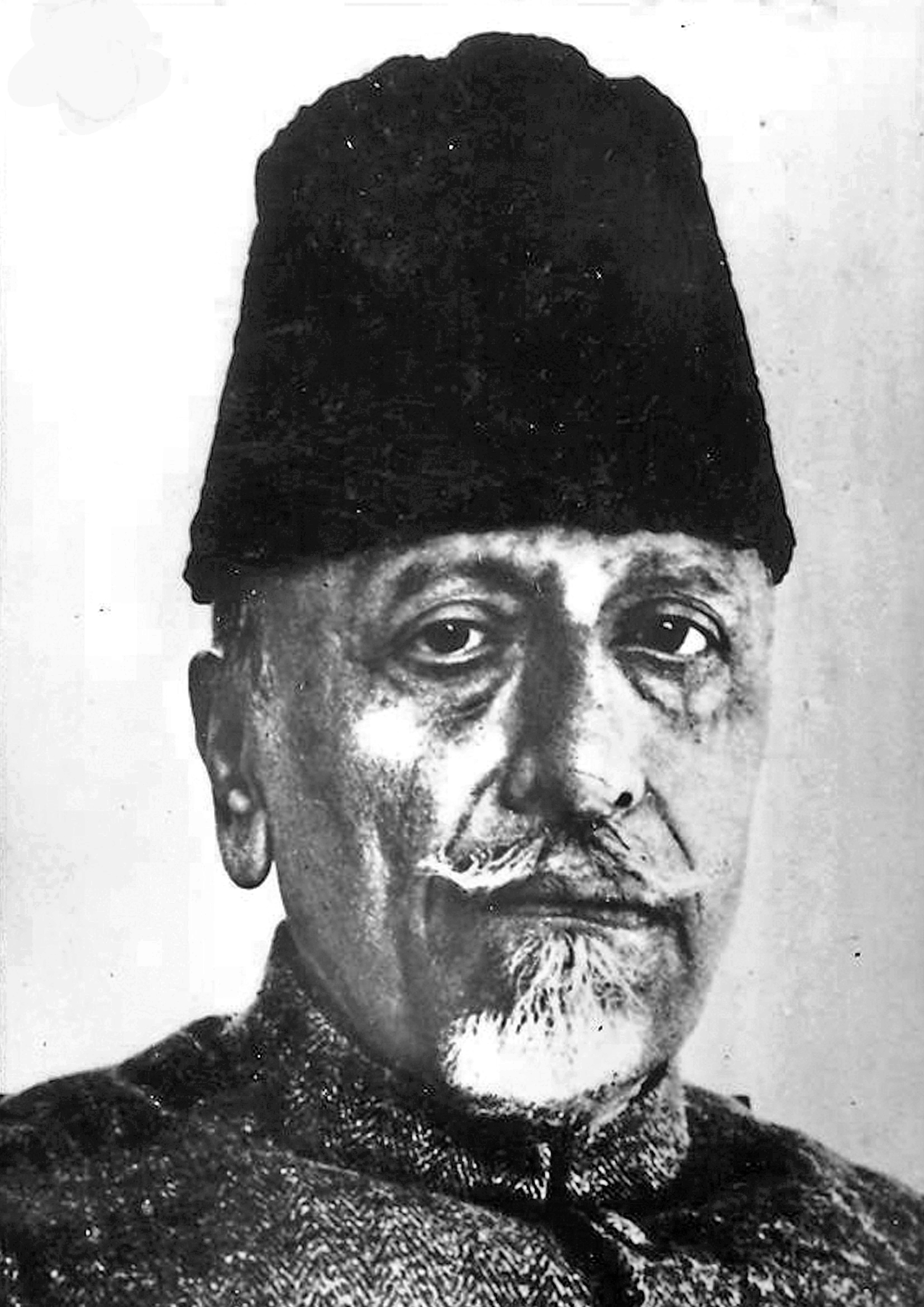
Maulana Abul Kalam Azad

National Education Day is an annual observance in India to commemorate the birth anniversary of Maulana Abul Kalam Azad, the first education minister of independent India, who served from 15 August 1947 until 2 February 1958. National Education Day of India is celebrated on 11 November every year.

The Ministry of Human Resource Development announced on 11 September 2008, "The Ministry has decided to commemorate the birthday of this great son of India by recalling his contribution to the cause of education in India. November 11 every year, from 2008 onwards, will be celebrated as the National Education Day, with declaring it as a holiday." All educational institutions in the country mark the day with seminars, symposia, essay-writing, elocution competitions, workshops and rallies with banner cards and slogans on the importance of literacy and the nation's commitment to all aspects of education.

The day is also seen as an occasion to remember Azad's contribution in laying the foundations of the education system in an independent India, and evaluating and improving the country's current performance in the field.
