= The Vakil =

Urdu language newspaper

- Type: Weekly
- Format: Broadsheet
- Owner(s): Sheikh Ghulam Muhammad
- Editor: Mirza Heyrat Dehlavi; Insha Allah Khan; Abu Kalam Azad; Abdullah Minhas; Shujaullah
- Founded: 1895
- Language: Urdu
- Headquarters: Amritsar, British Raj

The Vakil (Urdu: وکیل) was an Urdu language newspaper published from Amritsar during the British Raj. Initially it was bi-weekly newspaper but later it became three days. This newspaper was started by Inayatullah Khan Mashriqi's father Khan Ata Muhammad Khan in 1895 and published until about July 28, 1931.

The first editor of the newspaper was Mirza Hairat Dehlavi but separated after editing two pamphlets. In October of the same year, Insha Allah Khan became the editor. Abul Kalam Azad was associated with Vakil as one of the editor for five years, from 1903 to 1908.
