= Khaksar movement =

Part of the Indian independence movement

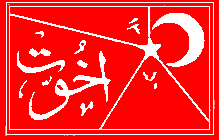
- Founder: Inayatullah Khan Mashriqi
- Founded: 1931
- Newspaper: Al-Islah
- Religion: Islam
- Colors: Red & White

The Khaksar movement was established by Inayatullah Khan Mashriqi in 1931, with the aim of freeing India from the rule of the British Empire.

The Khaksars opposed the partition of India and favoured a united country. The membership of the Khaksar movement was open to everyone regardless religion, race, caste or social status. There was no membership fee. The emphasis was on the brotherhood of mankind and being inclusive for all people.

== History ==
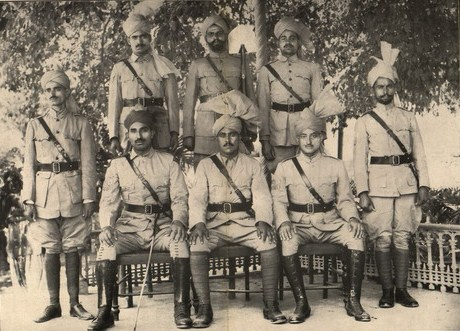
Khaksars in uniform

Khaksars in Hyderabad

Around 1930, (Note: Amalendu De says that the foundation was in 1931; Roy Jackson believes that it was in 1930.) Allama Mashriqi, a charismatic Muslim intellectual whom some considered to be of anarchist persuasion, revisited the principles for self-reform and self-conduct that he had laid out in his 1924 treatise, entitled Tazkira. He incorporated them into a second treatise, Isharat, and this served as the foundation for the Khaksar movement, which Roy Jackson has described as being "...essentially to free India from colonial rule and to revive Islam, although it also aimed to give justice and equal rights to all faiths." They took their name from the Persian words khak and sar, respectively meaning dust and like and roughly combined to translate as a "humble person". Shorty after its formation Khaksar visited travelled to Germany, where he met Nazi leaders, provoking British authorities.

Adopting the language of revolution, Mashriqi began recruiting followers to his cause in his village of Ichhra near Lahore. An early report said that the movement began with 90 followers. It quickly expanded, adding 300 young members within a few weeks. By 1942 it was reported that the membership was four million and Jackson remarks that it was "phenomenal in its success." There was also an associated weekly newspaper called Al-Islah.

On 4 October 1939, after the commencement of the Second World War, Mashriqui, who was then in Lucknow jail, offered to increase the size of the organisation to help with the war effort. He offered a force of 30,000 well-drilled soldiers for the internal defence of India, 10,000 for the police, and 10,000 to provide help for Turkey or to fight on European soil. His offer was not accepted.

On 19 March 1940, just 3 days before All India Muslim Leagues most momentous meeting, at least 32 or as much as 300 Khaksars, including their pivotal leader Agha Zaigham were mercilessly killed by the Punjab Police under the command of the Superintendent Police, D. Gainsford in Lahore, British India. Because of which then Premier of Punjab Sikandar Hayat Khan consulted Jinnah for postponement of All India Muslim League session which Jinnah denied.

Due to the movement's rigid manifesto and strict policies to adhere to their own ideology, it often came into conflict with the ruling British government. Allama Mashriqi and some of his followers spent much time in British government's jails. Mashriqi was kept in jail without any legal proceedings. In protest, he had fasted to the point of death. Mashraqi was released from Vellore Jail on 19 January 1942, but his movements were restricted to Madras Presidency. He remained interned until 28 December 1942. Mashraqi arrived in New Delhi on 2 January 1943.

The Khaskar Movement was vocal in its opposition to the partition of India, and instead favored a united India. During the partition itself, the Khaksars took a vow to do what they could to protect those in distress; this resulted in many lives being saved, including Hindus, Sikhs and Muslims. In one incident, a Khaksar volunteer entered a local colony near Rawalpindi to calm people down, but was stabbed to death.

Allama Mashriqi disbanded the Khaksar Tehrik on 4 July 1947 considering that the Muslims of India were more than satisfied after the newly revived hope of a new separate Muslim state i.e. Pakistan and he felt that they had lost much of their motivation which could meet the requirements of the Khaksar movement. Khaksar movement's declared objectives of unity of India regardless of religion eventually came in conflict with All-India Muslim League's and Muhammad Ali Jinnah's objectives of two-nation theory based on the religions of Hindus and Muslims of British India. A significant number of the Indian Muslim population gravitated to the formation of a separate Muslim nation and thus helped create Pakistan in 1947.

The Khaksar was banned in India after the government launched a crackdown against organisations dedicated to promoting communal hatred or preaching violence in the aftermath of the assassination of Mahatma Gandhi.

Khaksar Tehrik was later revived as a civilian political group after the death of Mashriqi on 27 August 1963 at Lahore and it sometimes made political alliances with other Pakistani political parties, for example, it joined the Pakistan National Alliance in 1977.

== Ideology ==
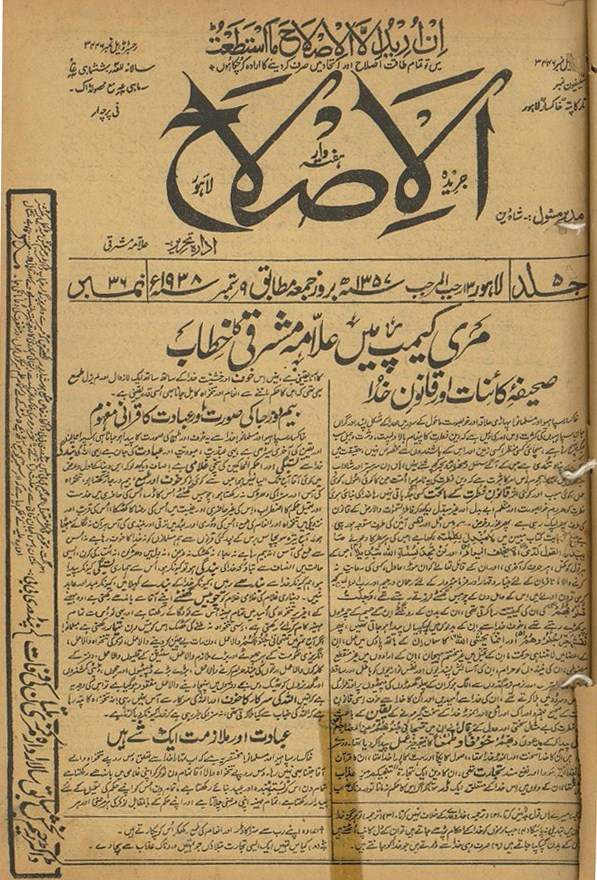
"Al-Islah" (Khaksar Tehrik weekly)

=== Twenty-Four Principles ===
Mashriqi had said in 1931 that the Khaksar movement had three distinct objectives; "to emphasise the idea of superiority of God, unity of the nation and service to mankind". In addition, Mashriqi outlined twenty-four principles on 29 November 1936 in an address to a Khaksar camp at Sialkot. This initial speech and subsequent set of principles laid out by the movement founder, encouraged members of the movement to serve the people regardless of their caste or religion; and Khaksars were expected to convince others to join the movement through "love and affection".

=== Fourteen Points; The Khaksar Creed ===
On 14 March 1937, Mashriqi again addressed a camp of Khaksars at Lahore to further clarify the fourteen points that became the foundation of the movement. These points solidified the notion that the movement was both dictatorial and militaristic. In other words, the movement founder Mashriqi was mainly shaping the policy guidelines. The organisation was set up in a way where Mashriqi was the Khaksar-e-Azam (the biggest khaksar) with an advisory council but Allama could overrule any advice. He was entitled to remove any movement member from the organisation while there was no procedure to remove him. At this point, its aims were to establish self-rule in India. However the success of Muslim rule in India necessitated certain conditions, such as: "(a) "regard for the religious and social sentiments of the various communities that live in British India: (b) maintenance of their particular culture and customs, and (c) general tolerance".

The volunteers of the Khaksar movement were expected to participate daily in military parade and social work. They were seen drilling and parading in playgrounds, streets and neighborhoods wearing khaki uniforms with spades on their shoulders. The movement workers were required to bear their own expenses and find spare time for work of social welfare in the community.

== Khaksar symbols ==
All members, regardless of rank, wore the same uniform: a khaki shirt with khaki pyjama secured with a belt, together with military boots. The khaki colour was chosen because it was "simple and unassuming" and "cheap and available for all"; in practice, however, the uniforms were paid for by the Khaksar organisation. They wore a red badge (akhuwat) on their right arm as a symbol of brotherhood. On their heads, Khaksars wore the white handkerchief of the Arabs and Hajis, consisting of a white cloth the length and width of one and one-half yards which was secured around the head with a cotton string. Some Khaksar's wore the Punjabi style turban on their head with the cloth flowing down and a fan shaped shamla peaking up.

All Khaksars carried a bailcha (spade) as a sign of unity and strength. In addition, the spade represents humility; in the same way that a spade is used to level the ground, the Khaksars used it as a symbol of the "leveling" of society. In other words, it was meant to be used to level the existing society for equity and equality and remove the existing division among the rich and the poor.

The flag of the Khaksars is a modified Ottoman symbol: a crescent moon and a star on a red background.

== Notable Members ==
- Sheikh Mohammed Sultan, Bangladeshi Artist and he is considered one of the greatest artists in South Asia.
- Khan Abdul Jabbar Khan, Pakistani politician and 1st Chief Minister of West Pakistan.
- Ahmad Faraz, Pakistani poet and founding director general (later chairman) of Pakistan Academy of Letters.
- Habibullah Khan Marwat, Pakistani politician and 1st Chairman of the Senate of Pakistan.
- Bayazeed Khan Panni, former East Bengal commander and founder of pesudo-islamic Quranist movement Hezbut Tawheed.

== See also ==
- Al-Islah (newspaper)
- All India Azad Muslim Conference
- Composite Nationalism and Islam
