= Abadi Bano Begum =

Indian independence movement activist

Abadi Bano Begum (Bi Amma )
- Born: 1850; Mughal Empire
- Died: 13 November 1924 (aged 73–74)
- Known for: Indian independence movement activist
- Spouse: Abdul Ali Khan
- Children: 6 including Maulana Mohammad Ali Jouhar; Maulana Shaukat Ali

Abadi Bano Begum (Bi Amma) (Urdu: عبادی بانو بیگم) (Born 1850 Died:13 November 1924) was a prominent voice in the Indian independence movement. She was also known as Bi Amma. She was one of the first Muslim women to actively take part in politics and was part of the movement to free India from the British Raj.

== Early & personal life ==
Born in 1839 in Amroha, then a village of Uttar Pradesh, she married Abdul Ali Khan, a senior official in the Rampur State. The couple had one daughter and five sons. After her husband's death at a young age, the responsibility to look after her children fell on her. Even though she had limited resources, Abadi Bano Begum pawned her personal jewellery to educate her children. Bano Begum did not have any formal education but still sent her children to an English-medium school in the town of Bareilly, Uttar Pradesh. Her sons, Maulana Mohammad Ali Jouhar and Maulana Shaukat Ali went on to become leading figures of the Khilafat Movement and the Indian independence movement. They played an important role during the non-cooperation movement against the British Raj.

== Contribution in Indian independence movement ==
Abadi Bano Begum took an active part in politics and was part of the Khilafat committee. In 1917, she joined the agitation to release Annie Besant and her two sons from prison. Mahatma Gandhi encouraged her to speak, as she could get the support of women in the freedom movement. In 1917, during the sessions of the All India Muslim League, she gave a most touching and forceful speech which left a lasting impression on the Muslims of British India.

She traveled extensively throughout India to galvanize support for the Khilafat movement. Abadi Bano Begum played an important part in fundraising for the Khilafat movement and the Indian independence movement. She, along with Begum Hasrat Mohani, the wife of Maulana Hasrat Mohani, Basanti Devi, Sarala Devi Chaudhurani, and Sarojini Naidu, often addressed women-only gatherings and exhorted women to donate to the Tilak Swaraj Fund which was set up by Bal Gangadhar Tilak for the Indian freedom movement. She was active in the freedom movement until her death in 1924.

== Death ==
Abadi Bano Begum died on 13 November 1924 at age 73.

=== Commemorative postage stamp ===
On 14 August 1990, Pakistan Post Office issued a commemorative postage stamp in her honor in its 'Pioneers of Freedom' series.
