= Mohammad Ali Jauhar =

Indian Muslim activist (1878–1931)

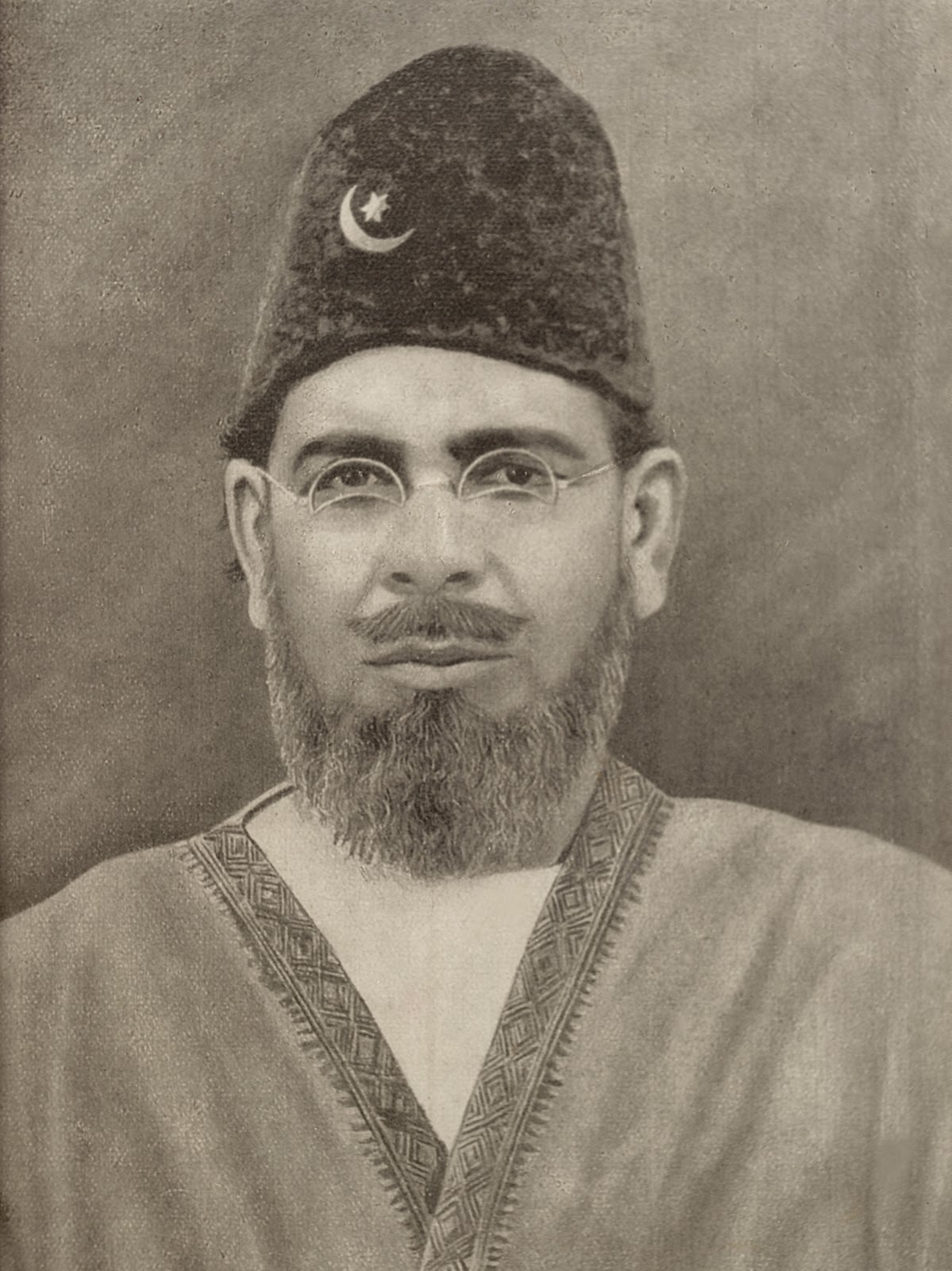
- Jauhar, before 1931

10th President of All-India Muslim League
- In office 30 December 1917 – 1 January 1918
- Preceded by: Muhammad Ali Jinnah
- Succeeded by: Mohammad Ali Mohammad Khan

41st President of Indian National Congress
- In office 1923–1923
- Preceded by: Chittaranjan Das
- Succeeded by: Abul Kalam Azad

Personal details
- Born: 10 December 1878 Rampur, Rampur State, British India
- Died: 4 January 1931 (aged 52) London, England
- Resting place: Jerusalem
- Party: All India Muslim League
- Other political affiliations: Indian National Congress
- Spouse: Amjadi Bano Begum (m. 1902–1931)
- Relations: Shaukat Ali (brother); Zulfiqar Ali Khan (brother); Gauhar Ali Khan (brother)
- Parent(s): Abdul Ali Khan (father); Abadi Bano Begum (mother)
- Occupation: Journalist, scholar, political activist, poet
- Known for: Khilafat movement
- Religion: Islam
- Founder of: Jamia Millia Islamia

Mohammad Ali Jauhar (10 December 1878 – 4 January 1931) was an Indian politician and activist of the Indian independence movement. He was a co-founder of the All-India Muslim League and Jamia Millia Islamia.

Born into an anti-colonial family, Jauhar was a member of the Aligarh movement. He was elected president of the Indian National Congress in 1923, but his tenure lasted only a few months owing to disagreements with the organization—particularly with Mohandas Gandhi—over the abrupt ending of the Non-Cooperation Movement. In the following years, he ended up being antithetical to Congress and accused Gandhi and Motilal Nehru of succumbing to the appeasement of Hindus and refusing to accommodate Muslim demands for political representation. As one of the founders and the 10th president of the All-India Muslim League, he represented the party in the first round-table conference held in London.

Jauhar was also a leading figure of the Khilafat Movement.

== Early life and career ==
Mohammad Ali Jauhar was born in 1878 at Rampur in North-Western Provinces, British India. He was born to a wealthy family with roots in the city of Najibabad. His father, Abdul Ali Khan, died when he was five years old. His brothers were Shaukat Ali, who became a leader of the Khilafat Movement, and Zulfiqar Ali. His mother Abadi Begum (1852 – 1924), affectionately known as 'Bi Amman', inspired her sons to take up the mantle of the struggle for freedom from the British colonial rule. To this end, she was adamant that her sons were properly educated. Due to the efforts, determination and sacrifice of their mother, Jauhar and his brothers were able to get a good quality education.

Despite the early death of his father, Jauhar attended Aligarh Muslim University and the Allahabad University, eventually moving to England in 1898, attending Lincoln College, Oxford to study modern history.

Upon his return to India, he served as education director for the Rampur state, and later joined the Baroda civil service. He became a writer and an orator as well as a political leader, writing articles in major British and Indian newspapers like The Times, London, The Manchester Guardian and The Observer. He launched the English weekly The Comrade in 1911 in Calcutta. It quickly gained circulation and influence internationally. He moved to Delhi in 1912 and there he launched an Urdu-language daily newspaper Hamdard in 1913. He married Amjadi Bano Begum (c. 1886–1947) in 1902. Amjadi Begum was also actively involved in the national and Khilafat movement.

Jauhar worked hard to expand the Aligarh Muslim University, then known as the Muhammadan Anglo-Oriental College, and was one of the co-founders of the Jamia Millia Islamia in 1920, which was later moved to Delhi.

== Khilafat movement in India ==
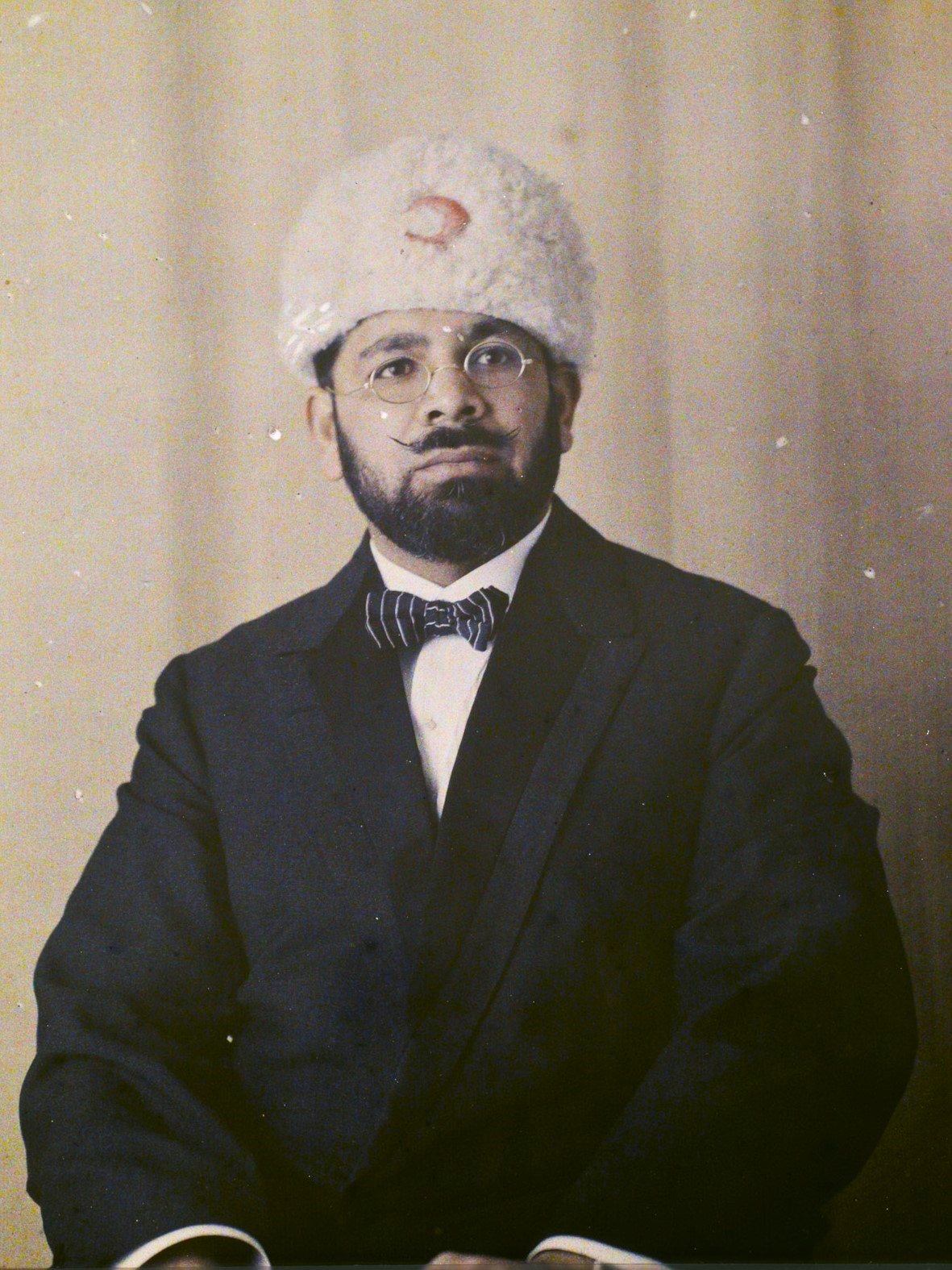
Autochrome portrait by Auguste Léon, 1920

Jauhar had attended the founding meeting of the All India Muslim League in Dacca in 1906, and served as its president in 1918. He remained active in the League till 1928. Jauhar "had the unique distinction of having directed the affairs of the three most important political parties/movements in the country — The Indian National Congress, the All India Muslim League and the Khilafat movement."

He represented the Muslim League delegation that travelled to England in 1919 to convince the British government to influence the Turkish nationalist Mustafa Kemal not to depose the Sultan of Turkey, who was the Caliph of Islam and the presumed leader of all the Islamic nations of that time. The British government's rejection of these demands resulted in the formation of the Khilafat committee which directed Muslims all over India to protest and boycott the British government.

In 1921, Jauhar formed a broad coalition with the nationalist leaders like Shaukat Ali, Abul Kalam Azad, Hakim Ajmal Khan, Mukhtar Ahmed Ansari, Syed Ata Ullah Shah Bukhari as well as Mahatma Gandhi, who then enlisted the support of the Indian National Congress and many thousands of Hindus, who joined the Muslims in a demonstration of unity against the British government. Jauhar also wholeheartedly supported Gandhi's call for a national civil resistance movement and inspired many hundreds of protests and strikes all over India. He was arrested by British authorities and imprisoned for two years for what was termed as a seditious speech at the meeting of the Khilafat Conference.

== Alienation from Congress ==
Jauhar was disillusioned by the end of Khilafat movement and Gandhi's suspension of non-cooperation movement in 1922, owing to the Chauri Chaura incident.

He restarted his daily Hamdard and left the Congress Party. He opposed the Nehru Report, which was a document proposing constitutional reforms and a dominion status of an independent nation within the British Empire, written by a committee of Hindu and Muslim members of the Congress Party headed by President Motilal Nehru. Jauhar particularly opposed the Nehru Report's 'acception' of separate electorates for Muslims, and supported the Fourteen Points of Muhammad Ali Jinnah and the Muslim League. He became a critic of Gandhi, breaking with fellow Muslim leaders like Abul Kalam Azad, Hakim Ajmal Khan and Mukhtar Ahmed Ansari, who continued to support Gandhi and the Indian National Congress.

== Imprisonment in Karachi ==
In 1921, the British government established a court in Khaliqdina Hall in Karachi and punished him with two-and-a-half years' imprisonment in Karachi central jail. Besides this jail sentence, he had served many and frequent jail sentences due to his anti-government activities. However, he kept fighting for the Muslim League.

== 1930 Round Table Conference in London ==
Jauhar's frequent jail sentences, his diabetes and lack of proper nutrition while jailed, made him very sick. Despite his failing health, he wanted to attend the first Round Table Conference held in London in 1930. He attended the 'Conference' in London, chaired by Sir Agha Khan of the Muslim delegation, to show that only the Muslim League spoke for India's Muslims. Reportedly, his words to the British government were that he would not return to India alive unless the country was set free: "I would prefer to die in a foreign country so long as it is a free country, and if you do not give us freedom in India, you will have to give me a grave here."

== Death and legacy ==
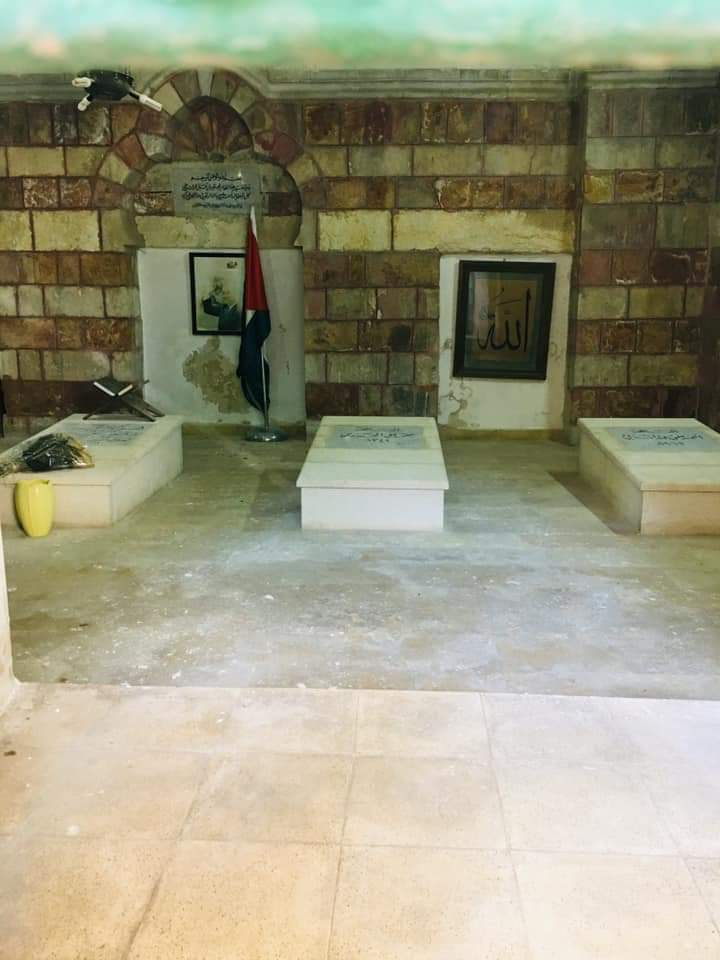
Grave of Mohammad Ali Jauhar in Jerusalem

Jauhar died of a stroke in London on 4 January 1931 and was buried in Jerusalem by the choice of his relatives, friends and admirers. The inscription on his grave in the Khātūniyya Madrasa, which is near the Dome of the Rock, says: "Here lies al-Sayyid Muhammad Ali al-Hindi."

== Commemorative postage stamp ==
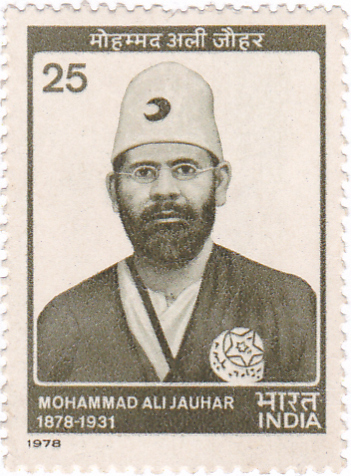
A commemorative postage stamp of Mohammade Ali Juahar

Indian Postal Service issued a birth centenary commemorative postage stamp in 1978. Pakistan Postal Services issued a commemorative postage stamp for Mohammad Ali Jauhar in its 'Pioneers of Freedom' series on his birth anniversary in 1978. A number of educational intuitions like Mohammad Ali Jauhar University in Rampur, India, Maulana Muhammad Ali Jauhar Academy of International Studies in Jamia Millia Islamia in Delhi, India, Maulana Mohammad Ali College in Bangladesh and places including Johar Town, Jauharabad, Gulistan-e-Jauhar in Pakistan are named after Jauhar .

== In popular culture ==
Maulana Mohammad Ali Jauhar is a 1984 documentary film directed by Saiyed Ahmad and produced by the Government of India's Films Division, it covers his political career and life as an Indian freedom fighter.

== Speeches ==
"I had long been convinced that here in this Country of hundreds of millions of human beings, intensely attached to religion, and yet infinitely split up into communities, sects and denominations, Providence had created for us the mission of solving a unique problem and working out a new synthesis, which was nothing low than a Federation of Faiths … For more than twenty years I have dreamed the dream of a federation, grander, nobler and infinitely more spiritual than the United States of America, and today when many a political Cassandra prophesies a return to the bad old days of Hindu-Muslim dissensions I still dream that old dream of 'United Faiths of India.'" —Mohammad Ali Jauhar; from the Presidential Address, I.N.C. Session, 1923, Cocanada (now Kakinada).
