= Day of Deliverance =

1939 All-India Muslim League celebration

The Day of Deliverance was a celebration day marked by the All-India Muslim League and others on 22 December 1939 during the Indian independence movement. It was led by the Muslim League's president Muhammad Ali Jinnah and was intended to celebrate the resignation of all members of the rival Indian National Congress party from provincial and central offices in protest over their not having been consulted over the decision to enter World War II alongside Britain.

== Background ==
In 1938 and 1939, the Muslim League tried to bring light to the grievances of Muslims and Muslim groups in Indian states run by Congress governments; the effort led to documents like the Pirpur Report: 1938, Muslim sufferings under the Congress rule by A. K. Fazlul Huq and Sharif Report: 1938, documenting pro-Hindu and anti-Muslim bias under Congress governments.

Lord Linlithgow, the Viceroy of India, declared India at war with Nazi Germany on 3 September 1939. The Indian National Congress, the dominant political party of Subcontinent, objected strongly to the declaration of war without prior consultation with Indians. The Congress Working Committee suggested that it would cooperate if there were a central Indian national government formed, and a commitment made to India's independence after the war. The Muslim League promised its support to the British, with Jinnah calling on Muslims to help the Raj by "honourable co-operation at the critical and difficult juncture," while asking Linlithgow for increased protection for Muslims.

Congress considered Linlithgow's subsequent response "wholly unsatisfactory and calculated to rouse resentment among all those who are anxious to gain India's independence," and on 22 October 1939, "call[ed] upon all Congress ministries to tender their resignations." The unilateral protest resignation was supported by Jawaharlal Nehru, but less so by Mahatma Gandhi, who felt that it would "strengthen the [Muslim] League and give the British full freedom in militarizing India throughout the war." Both Linlithgow and Jinnah were pleased with the resignations.

== Jinnah's appeal ==
On 2 December 1939, Jinnah put out an appeal, calling for Indian Muslims to celebrate 22 December 1939 as a "Day of Deliverance" from Congress:

I wish the Muslims all over India to observe Friday 22 December as the "Day of Deliverance" and thanksgiving as a mark of relief that the Congress regime has at last ceased to function. I hope that the provincial, district and primary Muslim Leagues all over India will hold public meetings and pass the resolution with such modification as they may be advised, and after Jumma prayers offer prayers by way of thanksgiving for being delivered from the unjust Congress regime. I trust that public meetings will be conducted in an orderly manner and with all due sense of humility, and nothing should be done which will cause offence to any other community, because it is the High Command of the Congress that is primarily responsible for the wrongs that have been done to the Musalmans and other minorities.

=== Congress reaction ===
The proposed Day of Deliverance was criticized as being divisive. On 9 December 1939, Gandhi appealed to Jinnah to end the observance in light of pending Congress/Muslim league unity discussions, and in anticipation of third party review of Muslim League allegations made about Congress' treatment of Muslims.

Nehru exchanged several letters with Jinnah between 9–14 December 1939, offering to deal with specific allegations of anti-Muslim actions, but the discussions fell through because Nehru refused to disassociate Congress from Indian Muslims unaffiliated with the Muslim League, and concluded that:

I regret to learn this for this means that, apart from communal questions, we differ entirely on purely political grounds. The Congress demand is essentially for a declaration of war aims and more especially for a declaration of Indian independence and the right of the Indian people to frame their own constitutions without external interference. If the Muslim League does not agree to this, this means that our political objectives are wholly dissimilar.

The celebration was also criticized by prominent senior Muslim members of Congress, including Abul Kalam Azad, who stated:

And now, when the Congress has given up on the government of eight provinces of its own choice and free will, what advice has the League President to offer to the Muslims? It is this that they should march toward the mosques and thank God on their deliverance from Congress ministries which preferred duty to power and have resigned not only on the issue of India's freedom but for the rights of all downtrodden peoples of the East. It is difficult to imagine any group of Muslims, howsoever at loggerheads with the Indian National Congress, would tolerate to be presented to the world in such colors.

== Observance ==
The Day of Deliverance was celebrated in many parts of India by Muslim League supporters, as well some non-Muslim Congress opponents. The latter included the All-India Depressed Classes Association, Dalit leader B. R. Ambedkar and the Independent Labour Party, Periyar, as well as some Parsis, and Anglo-Indians.

Before the Day of Deliverance events, Ambedkar stated that he was interested in participating: "I read Mr. Jinnah's statement and I felt ashamed to have allowed him to steal a march over me and rob me of the language and the sentiment which I, more than Mr. Jinnah, was entitled to use." He went on to suggest that the communities he worked with were twenty times more oppressed by Congress policies than were Indian Muslims; he clarified that he was criticizing Congress, and not all Hindus.

Jinnah and Ambedkar jointly addressed the heavily attended Day of Deliverance event in Bhindi Bazaar, Bombay, where both expressed "fiery" criticisms of the Congress party, and according to one observer, suggested that Islam and Hinduism were irreconcilable.

Periyar of the Justice Party called upon his party and all Dravidians to celebrate 22 December "on a grand scale...to rid the country of the menace of the Congress."

Meetings and rallies were held by Muslims in various parts of Bengal, which was a step in the development of Bengali Muslim separatist politics.

== Remembrance ==
The Day of Deliverance is included in the Pakistani Federal Public Service Commission and Civil Service Commission's competitive examinations.

== Sources ==
- Keer, Dhananjay (1954). Dr. Ambedkar: Life and Mission. Mumbai: Popular Prakashan. ISBN 81-7154-237-9.
