= Din Dunia =

Urdu magazine published from New Delhi

Din Dunia, a historical Urdu magazine published from Old Delhi. Established in 1921, Din Dunia originally covered politics, films, and society gossip. Today, it is a monthly journal that covers Islamic matters. Mufti Shaukat Ali, who had founded it in 1921 as a weekly tabloid on society, politics, and films. The publication was temporarily suspended during the years following the Partition, after which the magazine was restarted with a single-minded focus on Islam. Owing to his father's ill health, Asif Fehmi took over Din Dunia in 1987.

At the moment, Din Dunia is published monthly.
