= Inayatullah Khan Mashriqi =

Pakistani mathematician (1888–1963)

Allama Inayatullah Khan Mashriqi
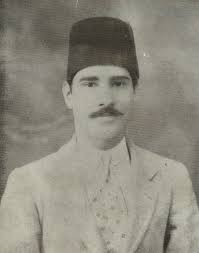
- Born: 25 August 1888; Amritsar, Punjab, British India
- Died: 27 August 1963 (aged 75); Lahore, Punjab, Pakistan
- Other name: Allama Mashriqi
- Citizenship: British India (1888-1947); Pakistan (1947-1963)
- Education: University of the Punjab; Christ's College, Cambridge
- Organization: Khaksar movement
- Movement: Indian independence movement Opposition to the partition of India

Inayatullah Khan Mashriqi (Punjabi: عنایت اللہ خاں مشرقی 'Ināyatullāh Khān Maśriqī; August 1888 – 27 August 1963), also known by the honorary title Allama Mashriqi (علامہ مشرقی 'Allāmah Maśriqī), was a British Indian, and later, Pakistani mathematician, logician, political theorist, Islamic scholar and the founder of the Khaksar movement.

Around 1930, he founded the Khaksar Movement, a para-military organization aiming both to revive Islam among Muslims as well as to advance the condition of the masses irrespective of any faith, sect, or religion. It was modelled after the German SS, Mashriqi being an admirer of Adolf Hitler, whom he had met.

== Early years ==
=== Background ===
Inayatullah Khan Mashriqi was born on 25 August 1888 to a Punjabi Rajput family from Amritsar. Mashriqi's father Khan Ata Muhammad Khan was an educated man of wealth who owned a bi-weekly publication, Vakil, in Amritsar. His forefathers had held high government positions during the Mughal and Sikh Empires. Because of his father's position he came into contact with a range of well-known luminaries including Jamāl al-Dīn al-Afghānī, Sir Syed Ahmad Khan, and Shibli Nomani as a young man.

=== Education ===
Mashriqi was educated initially at home before attending schools in Amritsar. From an early age, he showed a passion for mathematics. After completing his Bachelor of Arts degree with First Class honours at Forman Christian College in Lahore, he completed his master's degree in mathematics from the University of the Punjab, taking a First Class for the first time in the history of the university.

In 1907 he moved to England, where he matriculated at Christ's College, Cambridge, to read for the mathematics tripos. He was awarded a college foundation scholarship in May 1908. In June 1909 he was awarded first class honours in Mathematics Part I, being placed joint 27th out of 31 on the list of wranglers. For the next two years, he read for the oriental languages tripos in parallel to the natural sciences tripos, gaining first class honours in the former, and third class in the latter.

After three years' residence at Cambridge he had qualified for a Bachelor of Arts degree, which he took in 1910. In 1912 he completed a fourth tripos in mechanical sciences, and was placed in the second class. At the time he was believed to be the first man of any nationality to achieve honours in four different Triposes, and was lauded in national newspapers across the UK. The next year, Mashriqi was conferred with a DPhil in mathematics receiving a gold medal at his doctoral graduation ceremony.

He left Cambridge and returned to India in December 1912. During his stay in Cambridge his religious and scientific conviction was inspired by the works and concepts of Professor Sir James Jeans.

== Early career ==
On his return to India, Mashriqi was offered the premiership of Alwar, a princely state, by the Maharaja. He declined owing to his interest in education. At the age of 25, and only a few months after arriving in India, he was appointed vice principal of Islamia College, Peshawar, by Chief Commissioner Sir George Roos-Keppel and was made principal of the same college two years later. In October 1917 he was appointed under secretary to the Government of India in the Education Department in succession to Sir George Anderson. He became headmaster of the High School, Peshawar on 21 October 1919.

In 1920, the British government offered Mashriqi the ambassadorship of Afghanistan, and a year later he was offered a knighthood. However, he refused both awards.

In 1930, he was passed over for a promotion in the government service, following which he went on medical leave. In 1932 he resigned, taking his pension, and settled down in Ichhra, Lahore.

=== Nobel nomination ===
In 1924, at the age of 36, Mashriqi completed the first volume of his book, Tazkirah. It is a commentary on the Qur'an in the light of science. It was nominated for the Nobel Prize in 1925, subject to the condition it was translated into one of the European languages. However, Mashriqi declined the suggestion of translation. Shortly after is publication he travelled to Germany, where he met Nazi leaders, provoking British authorities.

== Political life ==
=== Mashriqi's philosophy ===
A theistic evolutionist who accepted some of Darwin's ideas while criticising others, he declared that the science of religions was essentially the science of collective evolution of mankind; all prophets came to unite mankind, not to disrupt it; the basic law of all faiths is the law of unification and consolidation of the entire humanity. According to Markus Daeschel, the philosophical ruminations of Mashriqi offer an opportunity to re-evaluate the meaning of colonial modernity and notion of post-colonial nation-building in modern times.

Mashriqi is often portrayed as a controversial figure, a religious activist, a revolutionary, and an anarchist; while at the same time he is described as a visionary, a reformer, a leader, and a scientist-philosopher who was born ahead of his time.

After Mashriqi resigned from government service, he laid the foundation of the Khaksar Tehrik (also known as Khaksar Movement) around 1930.

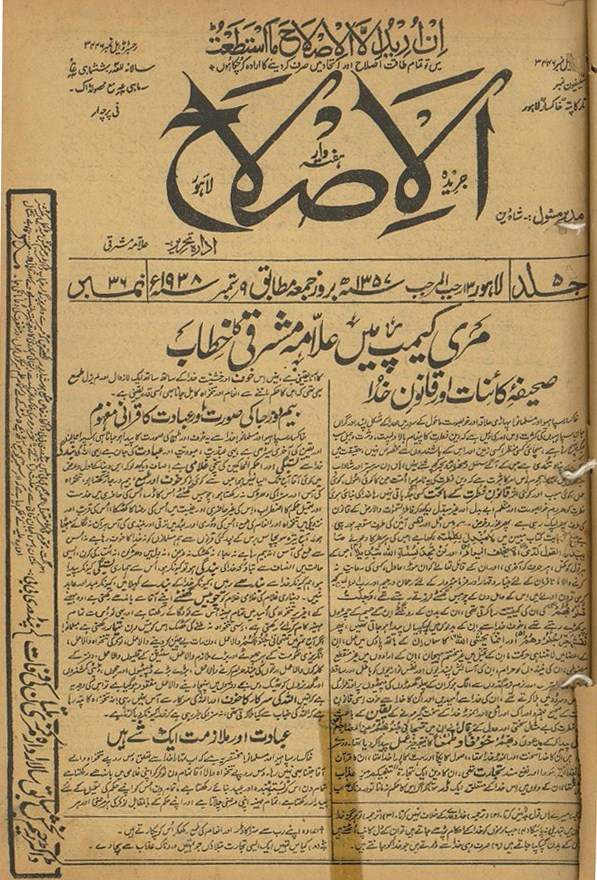
Al-Islah (Khaksar Tehrik weekly)

Mashriqi and his Khaskar Tehrik opposed the partition of India. He stated that the "last remedy under the present circumstances is that one and all rise against this conspiracy as one man. Let there be a common Hindu-Muslim Revolution. ... it is time that we should sacrifice…in order to uphold Truth, Honour and Justice." Mashriqi opposed the partition of India because he felt that if Muslims and Hindus had largely lived peacefully together in India for centuries, they could also do so in a free and united India. Mashriqi saw the two-nation theory as a plot of the British to maintain control of the region more easily, if India was divided into two countries that were pitted against one another. He reasoned that a division of India along religious lines would breed fundamentalism and extremism on both sides of the border. Mashriqi thought that "Muslim majority areas were already under Muslim rule, so if any Muslims wanted to move to these areas, they were free to do so without having to divide the country." To him, separatist leaders "were power hungry and misleading Muslims in order to bolster their own power by serving the British agenda."

=== Imprisonments and allegations ===
On 20 July 1943, an assassination attempt was made on Muhammad Ali Jinnah by an individual named Rafiq Sabir Mazangavi who was assumed to be a Khaksar worker. The attack was deplored by Mashriqi, who denied any involvement. Later, Justice Blagden of the Bombay High Court in his ruling on 4 November 1943 dismissed any association between the attack and the Khaksars.

In Pakistan, Mashriqi was imprisoned at least four times: in 1958 for alleged complicity in the murder of republican leader Khan Abdul Jabbar Khan (popularly known as Dr. Khan Sahib); and, in 1962 for suspicion of attempting to overthrow President Ayub's government. However, none of the charges were proven, and he was acquitted in each case.

In 1957, Mashriqi allegedly led 300,000 of his followers to the borders of Kashmir, intending, it is said, to launch a fight for its liberation. However, the Pakistan government persuaded the group to withdraw and the organisation was later disbanded.

== Death ==
Mashriqi died at the Mayo Hospital in Lahore on 27 August 1963 following a short battle with cancer. His funeral prayers were held at the Badshahi Mosque and he was buried in Ichhra. He was survived by his wife and seven children.

== Mashriqi's works ==
Mashriqi's prominent works include:

- Armughan-i-Hakeem, a poetical work
- Dahulbab, a poetical work
- Isha’arat, the Manifesto of the Khaksar movement
- Khitab-e-Misr (The Egypt Address), based on his 1925 speech in Cairo as a delegate to the Motmar-e-Khilafat
- Maulvi Ka Ghalat Mazhab
- Tazkirah Volume I, 1924, discussions on conflicts between religions, between religion and science, and the need to resolve these conflicts.
- Tazkirah Volume II, published posthumously in 1964.
- Tazkirah Volume III.

=== Fellowships ===
Mashriqi's fellowships included:

- Fellow of the Royal Society of Arts, 1923
- Fellow of the Geographical Society (F.G.S), Paris
- Fellow of Society of Arts (F.S.A), Paris
- Member of the Board at Delhi University
- President of the Mathematical Society, Islamia College, Peshawar
- Member of the International Congress of Orientalists (Leiden), 1930
- President of the All World's Faiths Conference, 1937

=== Edited works ===
- God, Man, and Universe: As Conceived by a Mathematician (works of Inayatullah Khan el-Mashriqi), Akhuwat Publications, Rawalpindi, 1980 (edited by Syed Shabbir Hussain).

== See also ==
- All India Azad Muslim Conference
- Teilhard de Chardin
- Karl Marx
