= Shaukat Ali (politician) =

Indian activist

Shaukat Ali Khan
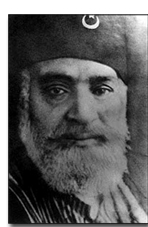
- Born: 10 March 1873; Rampur State, British India
- Died: 26 November 1938 (aged 65); Delhi, British India
- Movement: Khilafat movement
- Parent(s): Abdul Ali Khan(father); Abadi Bano Begum (mother) affectionately known as Halima II (1852- 13 November 1924)
- Relatives: Mohammad Ali Jauhar (brother); Zulfiqar Ali Khan (brother); Gauhar Ali Khan (brother)

Shaukat Ali Khan (10 March 1873– 26 November 1938; Urdu: مولانا شوكت علی خان) was an Indian Muslim member of the Khilafat Movement. He was the elder brother of the renowned political leader Mohammad Ali Jouhar.

== Early life ==
Shaukat Ali Khan was born in 1873 into a wealthy family with roots in the city of Najibabad in what is today Uttar Pradesh in India; other than that little is known about his family background.

He was educated at the Aligarh Muslim University. He was extremely fond of playing cricket, captaining the university team. Shaukat Ali served in the civil service of the United Provinces of Oudh and Agra for 17 years in British India.

== Khilafat movement ==
Shaukat Ali helped his younger brother Mohammad Ali Jauhar to publish the Urdu weekly Hamdard and the English weekly Comrade. In 1915 he published an article which said Turks were right to fight the British. These two weekly magazines played a key role in shaping the political policy of Muslim India back then. In 1919, while jailed for publishing what the British charged as seditious materials and organizing protests, he was elected as the last president of the Khilafat conference. He was re-arrested and imprisoned from 1921 to 1923 for his support to Mahatma Gandhi and the Indian National Congress during the Non-Cooperation Movement (1919–1922). His fans accorded him and his brother the title of Maulana. In March 1922, he was in Rajkot jail and was later released in 1923.

Though he is widely known as an advocate of non-violence in the struggle against the British colonialists, he supplied guns to Indian revolutionaries like Sachindra Nath Sanyal.

== Nehru report ==
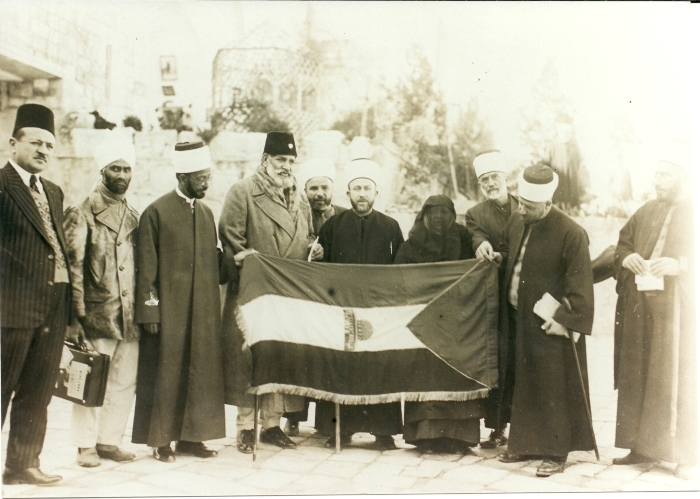
Handing of the Palestinian Muslim flag with a drawing of the Dome of the Rock over to Indian Muslim anti-colonial leader Shaukat Ali during his visit to Jerusalem, Mandatory Palestine, 1931

While still a supporter of Congress and its non-violent ethos, Shaukat Ali even surpassed some of his colleagues in also providing support to the revolutionary independence movement. To this end, he supplied guns to Sachindranath Sanyal.

He opposed the 1928 Nehru Report. Instead, he demanded separate electorates for Muslims and finally the Khilafat Committee rejected the Nehru Report. Shaukat Ali attended the first and second Round Table Conferences (India) in London in 1930-31. His brother Jauhar died in 1931, and Shaukat Ali continued on and organized the World Muslim Conference in Jerusalem.

In 1936, Shaukat Ali became a member of the All India Muslim League and became a close political ally of and campaigner for Muhammad Ali Jinnah, the future founder of Pakistan. He served as member of the 'Central Assembly' in British India from 1934 to 1938. He travelled all over the Middle East, building support for India's Muslims and the struggle for independence from the British rule in India.

== Death and legacy ==
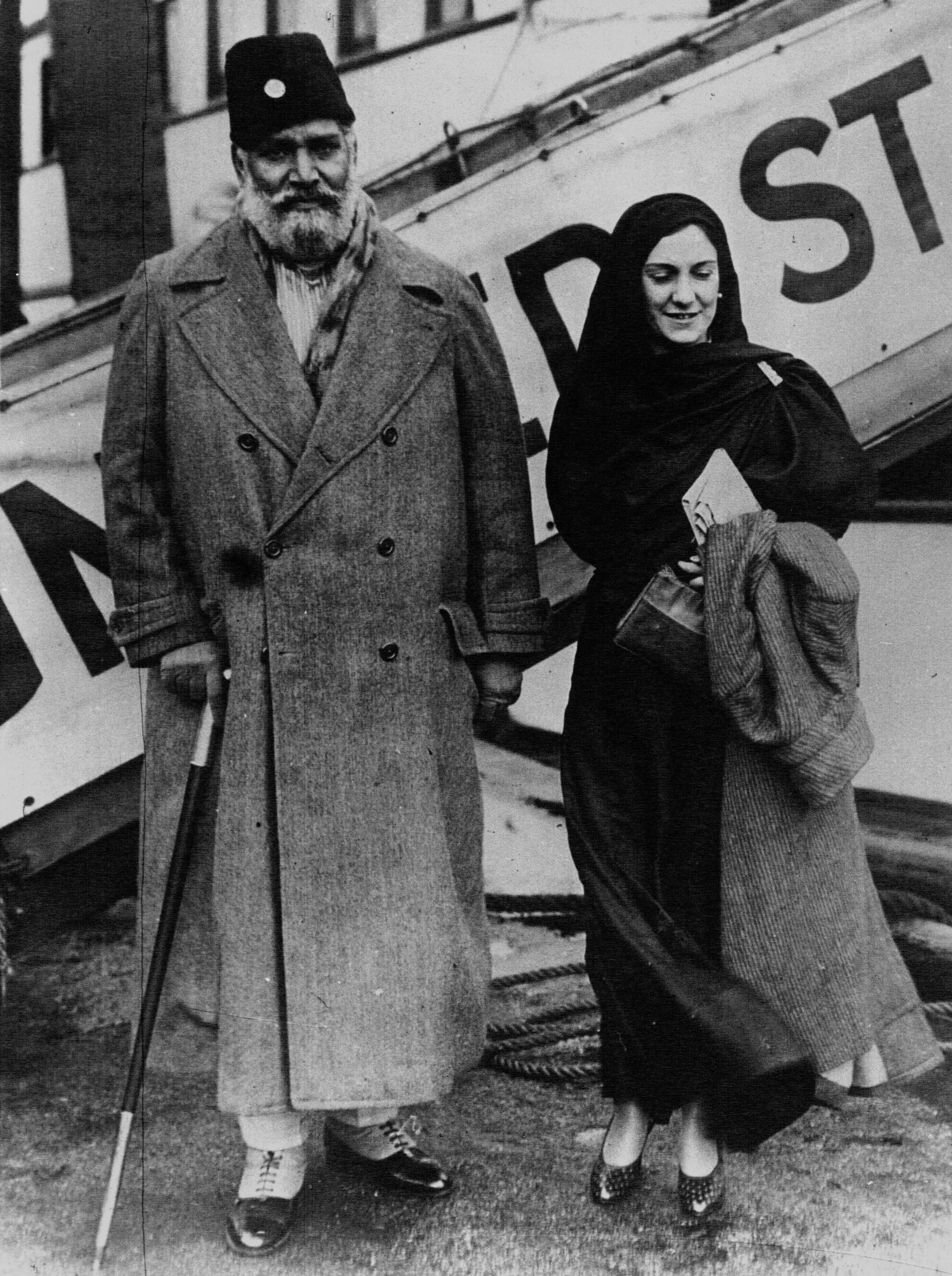
Maulana Shaukat Ali with his wife 1932

Shaukat Ali died on 26 November 1938 at the residence of Begum Mohammad Ali Jauhar, the widow of his brother, in Karol Bagh, a neighbourhood in Delhi. His body was buried near Jama Masjid, mina bazar in Shaukat Ali Masjid, Delhi on 26 November 1938.

=== Commemorative postage stamp ===
Pakistan Postal Services issued a commemorative postage stamp in his honor in 1995 in its 'Pioneers of Freedom' series.

=== Roads ===
A street in Mumbai (formerly Grant Road) is named after him. A road in Lahore is also named after him. A road in Rampur, UP named after him (Shaukat Ali Rd)
