= Non-cooperation movement (1919–1922) =

Indian freedom movement (1921-22)

The non-cooperation movement was a political campaign launched on 4 September 1920 by Mahatma Gandhi to encourage Indians to withdraw their cooperation from the British government, with the aim of persuading them to grant self-governance.

This came as a result of the Indian National Congress (INC) withdrawing its support for British reforms following the Rowlatt Act of 18 March 1919 – which suspended the rights of political prisoners in sedition trials, and was seen as a "political awakening" by Indians and as a "threat" by the British—which led to the Jallianwala Bagh massacre of 13 April 1919.

The movement was one of Gandhi's first organized acts of large-scale satyagraha. Gandhi's planning of the non-cooperation movement included persuading all Indians to withdraw their labour from any activity that "sustained the British government and also economy in India," including British industries and educational institutions. Through non-violent means, or ahimsa, protesters would refuse to buy British goods, adopt the use of local handicrafts, and picket liquor shops. In addition to promoting "self-reliance" by spinning khadi, buying Indian-made goods only, and boycotting British goods, Gandhi's non-cooperation movement also called for stopping planned dismemberment of Turkey (Khilafat Movement) and the end to untouchability. This resulted in publicly-held meetings and strikes (hartals), which led to the first arrests of both Jawaharlal Nehru and his father, Motilal Nehru, on 6 December 1921.

The non-cooperation movement was among the broader movement for Indian independence from British rule and ended, as Nehru described in his autobiography, "suddenly" on 4 February 1922 after the Chauri Chaura incident. Subsequent independence movements were the Civil Disobedience Movement and the Quit India Movement.

Though intended to be non-violent, the movement was eventually called off by Gandhi in February 1922 following the Chauri Chaura incident. After police opened fire on a crowd of protesters, killing and injuring several, the protesters followed the police back to their station and burned it down, killing the shooters and several other police inside. Nonetheless, the movement marked the transition of Indian nationalism from a middle-class basis to the masses.

== Factors leading to the non-cooperation movement ==
The non-cooperation movement was a reaction towards the oppressive policies of the British Indian government such as the Rowlatt Act of 18 March 1919, as well as the Jallianwala Bagh Massacre of 13 April 1919.

Although the Rowlatt Act of 1919, which suspended the rights of political prisoners in sedition trials, was never invoked and declared void just a few years later, it motivated Gandhi to conceive the idea of satyagraha (truth), which he saw as synonymous with independence.

Motivation for Gandhi's movement was further solidified following the events of 13 April 1919, when a large crowd had gathered at Jallianwala Bagh near the Golden Temple in Amritsar to protest against the arrest of Saifuddin Kitchlew and Dr. Satyapal, while others had come to attend the annual Baisakhi festival. The civilians were fired upon by soldiers under the command of Brigadier-General Reginald Dyer, resulting in killing and injuring thousands of protesters. The outcry generated by the massacre led to thousands of unrests and more deaths by the hands of the police. The bagh became the most infamous event of British rule in India.

Gandhi, who was a preacher of nonviolence, was horrified. He lost all faith in the goodness of the British government and declared that it would be a "sin" to cooperate with the "satanic" government. Likewise, the idea of satyagraha was subsequently authorised by Jawaharlal Nehru, for who the massacre also endorsed "the conviction that nothing short of independence was acceptable."

Gandhi derived his ideologies and inspiration from ongoing non-cooperation movements, particularly that by Satguru Ram Singh, who is credited as being the first Indian to use non-cooperation and boycott of British merchandise and services as a political weapon.

In response to the Jallianwala Bagh massacre and other violence in Punjab, the movement sought to secure Swaraj, independence for India. Gandhi promised Swaraj within one year if his non-cooperation programme was fully implemented. The other reason to start the non-cooperation movement was that Gandhi lost faith in constitutional methods and turned from cooperator of British rule to non-cooperator campaigning for Indian independence from colonialism.

Other causes include economic hardships to the common Indian citizen, which the nationalists attributed to the economic exploitation of India under colonial rule, the hardships faced Indian artisans due to British factory-made goods replacing handmade goods, and conscription being employed by the British Indian Army to gather enough recruits during the First World War.

== Movement ==
The non-cooperation movement aimed to challenge the colonial economic and power structure, and British authorities would be forced to take notice of the demands of the independence movement.

Gandhi's call was for a nationwide protest against the Rowlatt Act. In promoting "self-reliance," his planning of the non-cooperation movement included persuading all Indians to withdraw their labour from any activity that "sustained the British government and also economy in India," including British industries and educational institutions.

Through non-violent means, or ahimsa, protesters would refuse to buy British goods, adopt the use of local handicrafts (by spinning khadi, etc.), and picket liquor shops. Moreover:

- all offices and factories would be closed;
- Indians would be encouraged to withdraw from Raj-sponsored schools, police services, the military, and the civil service, and lawyers were asked to leave the Raj's courts;
- public transportation and English-manufactured goods, especially clothing, was boycotted; and
- Indians returned honours and titles given by the government and resigned from various posts like teachers, lawyers, civil and military services.

Gandhi's non-cooperation movement also called for the end to untouchability.

For Gandhi, the use of charkha to spin khadi and abandoning foreign clothes was important for the movement. According to Shashi Tharoor in the Inglorious Empire, the British Empire enriched itself by exploiting India’s cotton: raw cotton was bought cheaply, shipped to Manchester for processing, and sold back in India through the railways, while heavy duties of 70–80% crippled Indian textiles—so much so that historian H. H. Wilson admitted Manchester could not have competed otherwise. India’s share in global textile trade collapsed by 25%, master weavers were reduced to beggars, and British exports of cotton goods skyrocketed from 60 million yards in 1830 to nearly a billion by 1870. Gandhi’s call for the charkha and khadi became both an economic and symbolic weapon against colonialism, embodying simplicity and self-reliance. In India’s Struggle for Independence, historian Bipan Chandra recounted an episode from 1921, when students in Madurai complained khadi was costly, Gandhi shed his kurta and dhoti, donning only a langot(loincloth) as he felt that the problem could be solved by wearing less clothes.

Publicly-held meetings and strikes (hartals) during the movement ultimately led to the first arrests of both Jawaharlal Nehru and his father, Motilal Nehru, on 6 December 1921. The calls of early political leaders like Bal Gangadhar Tilak (Congress Extremists) were called major public meetings. They resulted in disorder or obstruction of government services. The British took them very seriously and imprisoned him in Mandalay in Burma and V. O.Chidambaram Pillai received 40 years of imprisonment.

Veterans such as Bal Gangadhar Tilak, Bipin Chandra Pal, Mohammad Ali Jinnah, and Annie Besant opposed the idea outright. The All India Muslim League also criticized the idea. However, the younger generation of Indian nationalists was thrilled and backed Gandhi, whose plans were adopted by the Congress Party in September 1920 and launched that December.

Gandhi strengthened the movement by supporting the contemporaneous Khilafat Movement, the Muslim campaign to restore the status of the Khalifa and protest the dismemberment of the Ottoman Empire after World War I. As such, Gandhi received extensive support from Indian-Muslim leaders like Maulana Azad, Mukhtar Ahmed Ansari, Hakim Ajmal Khan, Maghfoor Ahmad Ajazi, Abbas Tyabji, Maulana Muhammad Ali Jauhar and Maulana Shaukat Ali.

The eminent Hindi writer, poet, playwright, journalist, and nationalist Rambriksh Benipuri, who spent more than eight years in prison campaigning for India's independence, wrote:

When I recall Non-Cooperation era of 1921, the image of a storm confronts my eyes. From the time I became aware, I have witnessed numerous movements, however, I can assert that no other movement upturned the foundations of Indian society to the extent that the Non-Cooperation movement did. From the most humble huts to the high places, from villages to cities, everywhere there was a ferment, a loud echo.

== Impact and suspension ==
The impact of the revolt was a total shock to British authorities and a massive support to millions of Indian nationalists. Unity in the country was strengthened and many Indian schools and colleges were created. Indian goods were encouraged. On 4 February 1922 a massacre took place at Chauri Chaura, a small town in the district of Gorakhpur, Uttar Pradesh. A police officer had attacked some volunteers picketing a liquor shop. A whole crowd of peasants that had gathered there went to the police chowki (station). The mob set fire to the police chowki with some 22 policemen inside it. Around 30 mobs were there for this incident. This cruelty made Gandhi think to end the movement.

Mahatma Gandhi felt that the revolt was veering off-course, and was disappointed with the rise of violent nature of the movement. Before the non-cooperation movement there had been some instances of violence due to Rowlatt Satyagraha, one of which made the pretext for Jallianwala Bagh Massacre. During the non-cooperation movement, various incidents of violence emerged, including some major ones. In 1921, there had been Prince of Wales riots where Parsis, Jews and Anglo-Indians were attacked by a Hindu-Muslim mob which caused large scale destruction. Moplah Rebellion of 1921 had veered away from non-violent methods. Chauri Chaura incident was the final shock to him. Gandhi thought that Indian masses hadn't still internalised the importance of non-violence in his movements. Mahatma Gandhi did not want the movement to degenerate into a contest of violence, with police and angry mobs attacking each other back and forth, victimizing civilians in between. Gandhi appealed to the Indian public for all resistance to end, went on a fast and on 12 February 1922 called off the non-cooperation movement.

=== End of non-cooperation movement ===
The non-cooperation movement was withdrawn after the Chauri Chaura incident. Although he had stopped the national revolt single-handedly, on 12 February 1922, Mahatma Gandhi was arrested. On 18 March 1922, he was imprisoned for six years for publishing seditious materials. This led to the suppression of the movement and was followed by the arrest of other leaders.

Although most Congress leaders remained firmly behind Gandhi, the determined leaders broke away, including the Ali brothers (Shaukat Ali and Mohammad Ali Jouhar). Motilal Nehru and Chittaranjan Das formed the Swaraj Party, rejecting Gandhi's leadership. Many nationalists had felt that the non-cooperation movement should not have been stopped due to isolated incidents of violence, and most nationalists while retaining confidence in Gandhi, were discouraged.

== Aftermath ==
Gandhi's commitment to nonviolence was redeemed when, between 1930 and 1934, tens of millions again revolted in the Salt Satyagraha which made India's cause famous worldwide for its unerring adherence to non-violence. The Satyagraha ended in success. The demands of Indians were met and the Congress was recognized as a representative of the Indian people. The Government of India Act 1935 also gave India its first taste in democratic self-governance. The success of the Salt Satyagraha demonstrated Gandhi’s deliberate use of strategic retreat during the non-cooperation movement, reflecting his broader non-violent strategy of ‘Struggle–Truce–Struggle’ (S-T-S).

Gandhi had promoted Swadeshi campaign during this movement, which made good results. 62% of cloth sold in India was being made locally by 1936, rising to 76% by 1945. His promotion of the charkha enabled people to produce their own yarn, striking at the heart of British economic dominance while rallying anti-colonial sentiment, and this Gandhian influence on self-reliance has manifested in different forms in post-independence India as well.

== See also ==
- Champaran Satyagraha (1917)
- Rowlatt Satyagraha
- Civil-disobedience Movement (1930)
- Quit India Movement (1942)
- Bhoodan movement

== Biography ==
- Jawaharlal Nehru An Autobiography. Oxford University Press (1936)
- Tharoor, Shashi. Nehru: The Invention of India. Arcade Publishing (2003). New York. First edition. ISBN 9781559706971
- Jawaharlal Nehru and Nayantara Sahgal. Before freedom, 1909–1947 : Nehru's letters to his sister. Roli Books (2004). ISBN 8174363475 OCLC 85772500
- Wagner, Kim, Amritsar 1919: An Empire of Fear and the Making of a Massacre. Yale University Press (2019). ISBN 9780300200355
- Anand, Anita, The Patient Assassin: a true tale of massacre, revenge, and India's quest for independence, Simon & Schuster (2019), ISBN 978-1-5011-9570-9
