= Kohat (disambiguation) =

Kohat is a city in Khyber Pakhtunkhwa, Pakistan.

Kohat may also refer to:

- Kohat Division, an administrative unit of Khyber Pakhtunkhwa
  - Kohat District, a district within the division
    - Kohat Tehsil, a tehsil within the district, including several "Union Councils":
      - Kohat (Urban-I)
      - Kohat (Urban-II)
      - Kohat (Urban-III)
      - Kohat (Urban-IV)
      - Kohat (Urban-V)
      - Kohat (Urban-VI)
  - Kohat Subdivision, formerly Frontier Region Kohat, a region of Khyber Pakhtunkhwa adjacent to Kohat District
  - Kohat University of Science and Technology, a university in Pakistan
- Kohat Tunnel, a highway tunnel under the Khigana Mountains, Pakistan

== See also ==
- Kohat Enclave, a neighbourhood of North West Delhi, Delhi, India
  - Kohat Enclave metro station, a railway station in India
