= Punjabi Hindus =

Ethnoreligious group

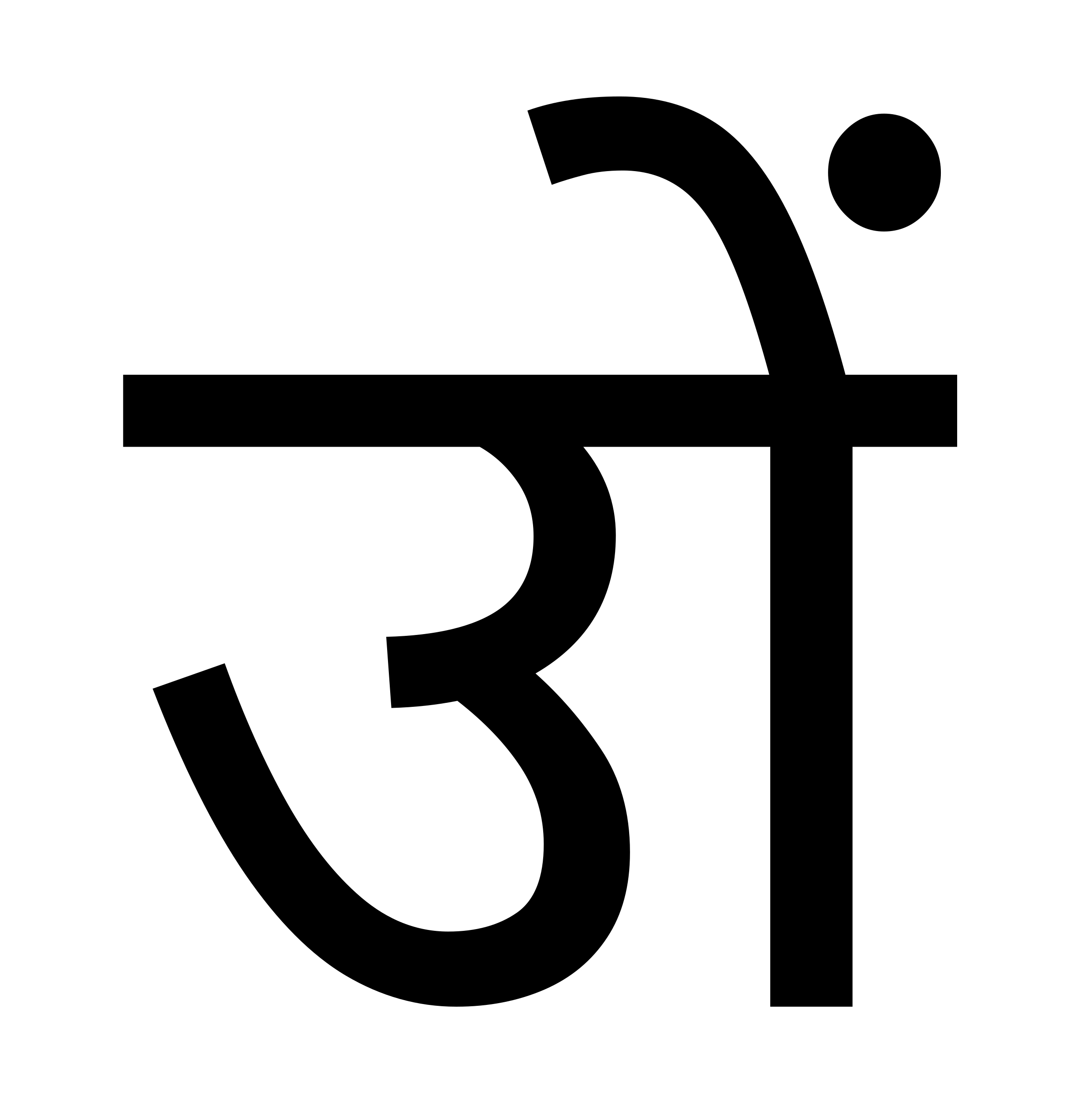
- Om/Omkar glyph found in historical manuscripts of Punjab and other northwestern regions of the Indian subcontinent

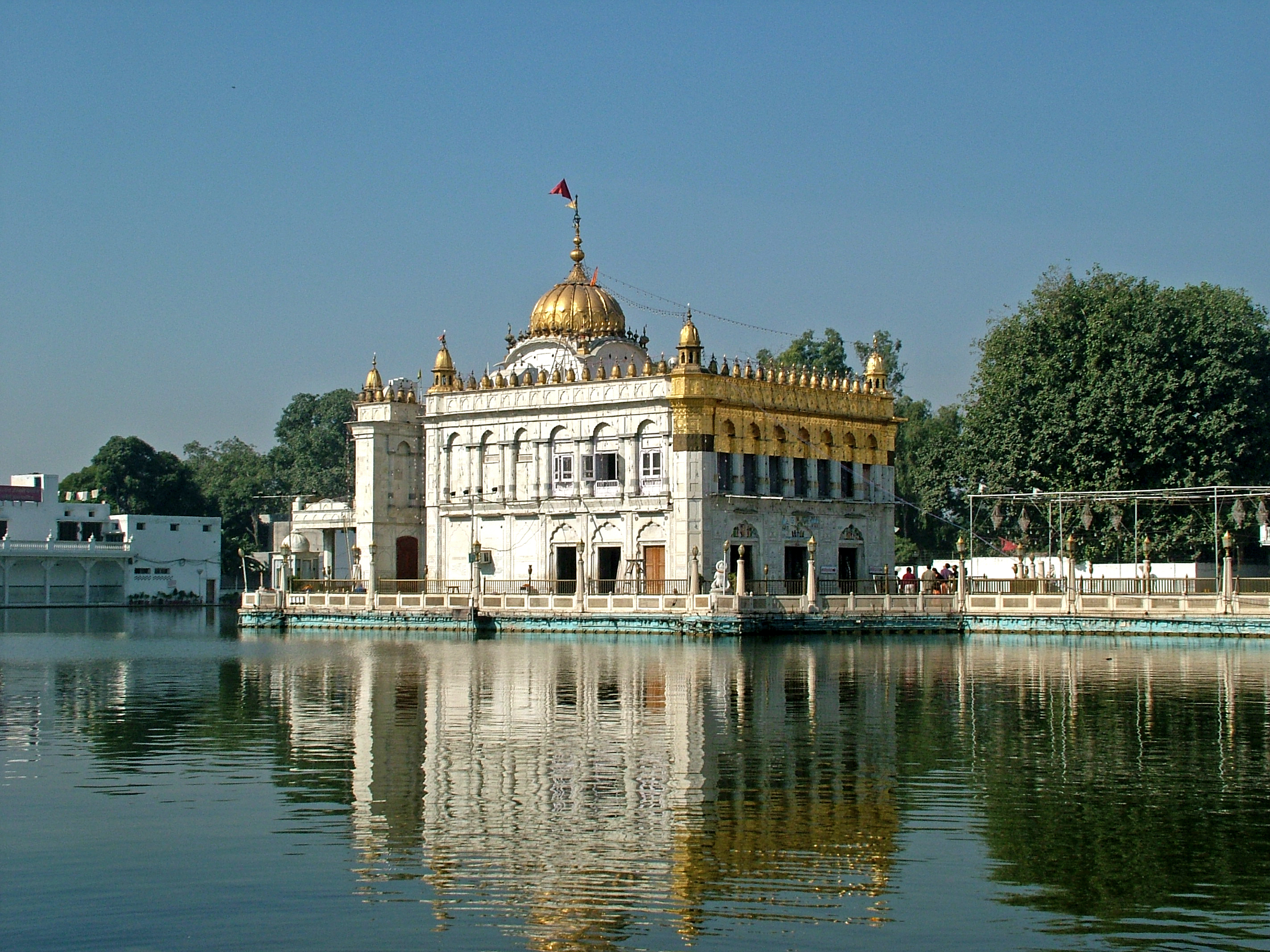
- Durgiana Temple, Amritsar

Total population
- c. 17,630,000–19,990,000 approx.

Regions with significant populations
- Punjab, India: 10,678,140 (2011 census)
- Delhi: 4,029,110 – 5,875,780 (2011 est.) (Note: “The most important section among settlers is the Punjabis who are estimated to constitute around 35 percent of the population.") (Note: “Though Punjabis constitute a mere twenty-four per cent of so of the capital city's population, on average they hold fifty-three per cent of the available managerial positions.") (Note: Punjabi Hindus represent between 24 and 35 per cent of Delhi's population, determined from 1991 and 2015 estimates. Based on the 2011 official census counts out of a total population of 16,787,941, this amounts to between 4,029,106 and 5,875,779 persons.)
- Haryana: 2,028,120 – 2,535,150 (2011 est.) (Note: “Punjabis constitute about eight per cent of the state’s population, they are a can’t-be-ignored political constituency.") (Note: “Political experts attribute the rise of the BJP in the region to sustained consolidation among certain communities, especially the Punjabis who account for 8% of the state’s estimated population of around 28 million.”) (Note: “From the announcement of candidates to the election campaign, the Congress primarily focused on the 22-25 percent Jat and 20-22 percent Scheduled Caste voters. In contrast, the BJP, in line with its non-Jat strategy, focused on the 30-32 percent OBCs, 9-10 percent Punjabis and 8-9 percent Brahmins.”) (Note: “The Punjabi population of Haryana is considered to be 10 percent of the total population of the state. Many constituencies even put this figure at around 14 percent. Of this population, 4 percent are Sikhs and the rest are Hindus.”) (Note: Punjabi Hindus represent between 8 and 10 percent of Haryana's population, determined from 2014, 2019, 2024, and 2025 estimates. Based on the 2011 official census counts out of a total population of 25,351,462, this amounts to between 2,028,117 and 2,535,146 persons.)
- Rajasthan: 281,050 (2011 est.)
- Himachal Pradesh: 222,410 (2011 est.)
- Punjab, Pakistan: 249,716 (2023 census)
- Chandigarh: 94,150 (2011 est.)
- Jammu: 59,930 (2011 est.)
- Uttarakhand: 27,240 (2011 est.)

Religions
- Hinduism (incl. Nanakpanthi)

Languages
- Punjabi and its dialects Hindi

Punjabi Hindus are ethnic Punjabis who adhere to Hinduism. Punjabi Hindus mostly inhabit the Indian state of Punjab, as well as Haryana, Himachal Pradesh, Delhi, and Chandigarh.

Punjabi Hindus are of a diverse range of castes, with the urban castes, particularly Khatris and Aroras, having historically played a dominant role in the region's trade, commerce, and industry. According to available demographic data, out of the Punjab state's total Hindu population of 38.5% (2011 census), Scheduled Castes constitute approximately 11%, while Other Backward Classes account for around 8.3%.

== History ==
=== Ancient period ===
Hinduism is the oldest recorded religion practiced by the Punjabi people. The historical Vedic religion of the Vedic period (1500–500 BCE) constituted the religious ideas and practices in Punjab, and centred primarily in the worship of Indra, the Hindu god of heaven and lightning. The Vedic tribes moved further eastwards and towards the Ganges-Yamuna doab during the late Vedic period, and Brahminism developed out of the Vedic origins in the Kurukshetra area. The Rigveda and other Vedas were composed during this period. The religion of the Vedic period is one of the precursors of Hinduism, and the Vedic period ended when the Hindu synthesis developed out of the interaction between Brahminism, Sramanism, and local religions. (Note: Michaels (2004, p. 38): "The legacy of the Vedic religion in Hinduism is generally overestimated. The influence of the mythology is indeed great, but the religious terminology changed considerably: all the key terms of Hinduism either do not exist in Vedic or have a completely different meaning. The religion of the Veda does not know the ethicised migration of the soul with retribution for acts (karma), the cyclical destruction of the world, or the idea of salvation during one's lifetime (jivanmukti; moksa; nirvana); the idea of the world as illusion (maya) must have gone against the grain of ancient India, and an omnipotent creator god emerges only in the late hymns of the rgveda. Nor did the Vedic religion know a caste system, the burning of widows, the ban on remarriage, images of gods and temples, Puja worship, Yoga, pilgrimages, vegetarianism, the holiness of cows, the doctrine of stages of life (asrama), or knew them only at their inception. Thus, it is justified to see a turning point between the Vedic religion and Hindu religions." Jamison, Stephanie; Witzel, Michael (1992). "Vedic Hinduism" (PDF). Harvard University. p. 3.: "... to call this period Vedic Hinduism is a contradictio in terminis since Vedic religion is very different from what we generally call Hindu religion – at least as much as Old Hebrew religion is from medieval and modern Christian religion. However, Vedic religion is treatable as a predecessor of Hinduism." See also Halbfass 1991, pp. 1–2)

An ancient Indian law book called the Manusmriti, developed by Brahmin Hindu priests, shaped Punjabi religious life from 200 BCE onward.

=== Medieval period ===
Punjabi Hinduism in the mediaeval period was characterized by Shaivism, Vaishnavism, and Shaktism. Temples for each tradition had their own sub-set of Brahmins dedicated to them.

At Shaivist temples, the Agamas and Puranas were held in esteem. Shaivist ascetics were known as sanyasis or dasnamis, who traditionally had ten internal orders. Wandering Shaivist ascetics founded centres which were known as maths.

Vaishnavists, usually found in urban mercantile communities, held the Bhagavad Gita, Bhagavata Purana, and Vishnu Purana in high-regard. Vaishnavist ascetics were known as bairagis. The Vaishnavists were vegetarians and teetotlers. After the Ghaznavid conquest, Gorakhnath founded a new tradition of Vaishnavism where hathyoga was theologically altered with Shiva as the supreme deity, with followers of this tradition becoming known as jogis or naths. The jogis/naths became very popular in the Punjab, headquartered at the Tilla of Gorakhnath, Tilla Jogian, in the Sindh Sagar Doab. By the early 16th century, the Nath tradition consisted of twelve divisions, known as bhekh-bara. Advanced jogis were known as kanpatas, distinguished by the mudra earrings they wore. The jogis believed they could achieve spiritual liberation while being alive (known as jiwan-mukti) and permanent bliss (sahaj), which could transform them into powerful siddhas. They rejected ritualism and metaphysics. They believed they could extend their life through meditative and breathing practices, and engaged in alchemy and herbal medicine. At their spiritual centres (maths), they maintained a permanent-fire known as a dhuni and a kitchen (bhandar). The jogis were accepting of all castes but shunned women.

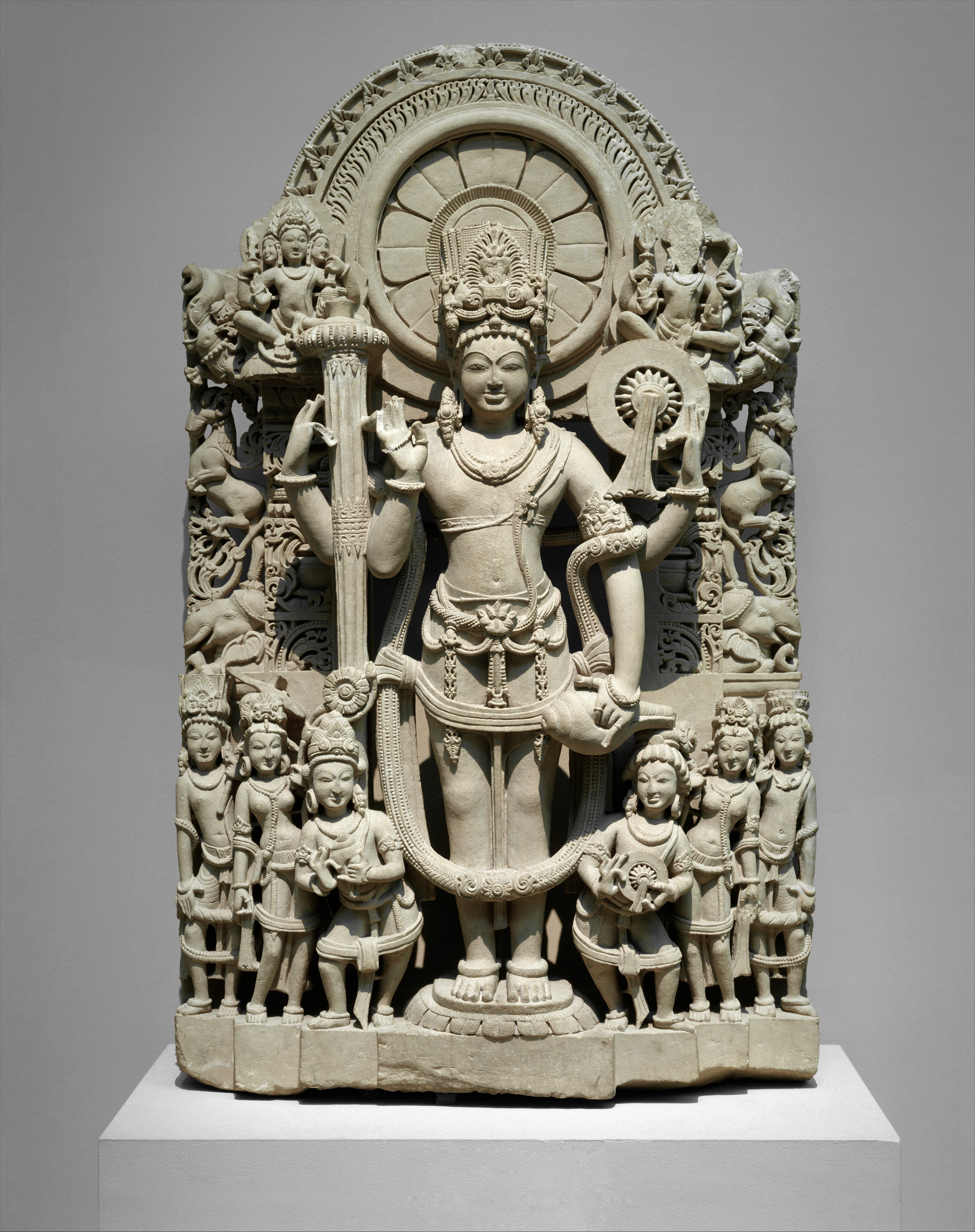
Vishnu sculpture found in Punjab, India, circa 10th–11th century, from The Metropolitan Museum of Art

Also among the Vaishnavists arose the Bhakti movement (originating from Ramanuja in southern India), which held that devotion (bhakti) was just as valid as a path to spiritual liberation or enlightenment, just as knowledge (gian or jnana) and rituals (karma) were held as. By the 13th and 14th centuries, the Bhaktists advocated for Vishnu's incarnations Rama and Krishna (and their consorts) as the supreme-deities to focus on and began promoting bhakti as the only path to spiritual salvation. The cult of Ram was developed further by the Ramanandis in the 14th and 15th centuries, with pathshalas and gaushalas being attached to their spiritual centres. The cult of Krishna followed in the late 15th and early 16th centuries, with its kirtan performances, developed by the followers of Chaitanya and Vallabha.

There was also the sant tradition, associated with the sants, which rejected idolatry and incarnation. Although not directly venerating Vishnu, was heavily influenced by Vaishnavism. The sants came from various backgrounds, such as jogis and Sufis. Two popular sants were Kabir and Ravidas, whom both rejected the prevailing socio-religious norms and customs of their eras. It focused on an immanent and transcendent divinity that could be reached internally in a state of union (sahaja-samadhi) to achieve live-liberation (jiwan-mukti). God was taken as the spiritual teacher, known as satguru and the divine word, shabad.

Shaktists venerated the goddesses and a cosmic force known as shakti and performed animal sacrifice. The Shaktists could be divided into two groups: the cultus of the right-hand and the cultus of the left-hand. Right-handers were similar to Shaivists whilst left-handers (known as vamacharis) were engaged in esoteric, black-rite practices that were supposed to be performed only by the advanced members. These esoteric practices were to achieve unity between Shakti and Shiva and involved alcohol (madya), fish (matsya), flesh (mansa), parched grain (mudra), and intercourse (maithuna).

Furthermore, popular religion as (distinguished from organized and formal religion) amongst the masses consisted of animism and fetishism, with the veneration and acceptance of folk-deities linked to nature and disease, malevolent-spirits, totems, and animal-worship. Cults formed around heroic figures and ancestors became venerated.

==== Medieval Punjabi Hindu society ====
Punjab was a Hindu-Buddhist society when Islam arrived in the region. The rise of Muslim-rule led to the disempowerment of Brahmins and Rajputs from their traditional leading roles within the society. Muslim rulers rarely gave patronage to Hindu institutions in Punjab. Brahmins became tied to the jajmani system and Hindu Rajputs were excluded from rule. Due to the lack of a strong Brahminical and kshatriya class amongst the Hindus, the Hindu Vaishya became very influential within the community.

With the oncoming of Islam in the region and local conversion to it, the usage of the term Hindu changed from its original, secular usage to describe an inhabitant of the Indian subcontinent to the new religious meaning of describing an inhabitant of the subcontinent that followed its indigenous religious traditions, to differentiate local Muslims from locals following native beliefs and practices. Punjab was conquered by the Muslim rulers and its native Rajput polities disintegrated, with some Rajputs converting to Islam while others moved to the desert or hill regions. Under the Lodhi Sultanate, Hindus remained the most popular religious community despite conversions, outnumbering Muslims, especially in the rural areas. However, the proportion of the Hindu population compared to the Muslim population was lower (especially in southwestern Punjab) when compared to other areas of the Indian subcontinent at the time. Some tribes wholly converted to Islam in the Sindh Sagar Doab and the southern portions of the Chaj, Rechna, and Bari doabs. Hindus were still found amongst the ruling administration, especially in the intermediate and lower rungs of power, such as the Rai zamindars whom acted as chaudaries and muqaddams, especially in the parganahs that adjoined the Shivalik Hills area. Conversion to Islam by Punjabi Hindus accelerated during the late 15th and early 16th century. In Punjab, conversion to Islam by locals was most prevalent in the western areas closer to Afghanistan and the Iranian plateau, characterised by mountain-passes, foothills, and plains, while the areas in the east of Punjab, such as the Himalayan foothills and highground, and the eastern and southeastern plains, remained predominantly Hindu (in the areas situated near Himachal Pradesh and Haryana), especially east of the Ravi River.

In the 11th century, Al-Biruni made observations about the varna and the castes associated with each in the region. By the late 15th century, the varna system was no longer functioning as it did in the rest of India, with the role of each caste in Punjab becoming ambiguous. The differentiation between the kshatriyas and the Vaishyas became difficult to decipher in Punjab's chatur-varna system. Jatis became more important than varnas. The role that Brahmins played in society diminished. Brahmins mostly lost their ruling patronage (as the Muslim rulers patronized the ulama instead) as Hindu political sovereignty collapsed. Instead, the Brahmins began serving as family priests, became temple caretakers, and began teaching at pathshalas. Other Brahmins abandoned their traditional roles and became engaged in agriculture, money-lending, or the trades and other services. The kshatriyas no longer properly existed as a varna by the 15th century (with an exception being found in the hilly region), with their duties now being done by the new rulers. Khatris, traditionally regarded as kshatriyas, became engaged in banking and money-lending, acting as sahukars, especially in urban areas, benefiting from the development of the local economy in the 14th and 15th centuries. Other mercantile castes included the Aroras in the western doabs and the Banias in the cis-Sutlej region. Jats were dominant in the rural areas, especially the upper Bari and Rechna doabs, and in the Bist Doab and cis-Sulej area, most Jats were no longer pastoralists and became cultivators but some became chaudaries and muqaddams alongside the Rajputs. The Gujjars, originally pastoralists, became cultivators and in the 15th century were still adhering to non-Islamic beliefs and practices. In-addition to land-cultivation, education, and administration, there were castes based in the services, artistry, and craftspeople, such as carpenters, leather-workers, potters, barbers (Nais), water-warriers (Jhivar), weavers, oil-pressers, gold-smiths, shoe-makers, brewers, bards (Bhats), singers, dyers, tailors, boaters, fishers, hunters, washers, basket-makers, and labourers/menials. Untouchables were known as Chandals. Despite the decline of a proper-functioning varna system, the Brahmins, Khatris, and Rajputs still considered themselves superior to other sections of the Hindu society and were patriarchal. Mercantile castes were more likely to be literate and trained in account-keeping. Administrative castes were educated in the Persian language, the language of governance. Hindu society still studied religious literature like the Vedas, Puranas, and Upanishads, and religious philosophy such as the six traditional schools of Hindu thought. Furthermore, they studied the secular fields of math, astronomy, medicine, grammar, prosody, jurisprudence, palmistry, and magic. Sati and child-marriage was practiced while widow remarriage was not. Hardship was explained as being due to the age of kalyug passing.

According to Devdutt Pattanaik, the roots of Sikhism lay in the trading classes of mediaeval Punjabi society. The Khatris were prominent within the Hindu society. They claimed kshatriya status but explained themselves taking up mercantile and trading professions due to a vow they had made to Parashuram for their survival. Sikhism had emerged within the Punjabi Khatri Hindu society (with all the Sikh gurus having a Khatri caste background), with a focus and emphasis on the nirguna aspect of the divine. Despite not claiming to venerate the Hindu deities, the Sikh gurus incorporated the corpus of Indic mythology, including its deities (saguna), in their teachings to appeal to the popular masses in Punjab at the time, such as the Jatts. The Jatts, similar to the Khatris, also claimed kshatriya status and claimed to have forgone their warrior ways and taken up ploughing due to a vow made to Parashuram. Other Jatts claimed a mythological origin to the hair-locks of Shiva (known as jata). The Jatts had a low ranking in the traditional Hindu society due to them not engaging in sati (widow immolation) and their practice of widow remarriage (chadar chadhana). Due to Mughal oppression, militarism amongst the Punjabi agriculturalist, pastoralist, and mercantile castes was revived and took shape in the Khalsa of Guru Gobind Singh in around 1700. The Sikh martiality incorporated Hindu themes, such as the goddess Bhagavati being reinterpreted as the sword.

Islam dominated the Punjab Plain politically for eight-hundred years. Although some Punjabi Hindus served as officials within the Muslim polities or may have briefly seized power, there were no Punjabi Hindu states during this period in the plains although Hindu polities existed in the mountaine area of the Punjab Hills ruled by Rajputs. Hindu Punjabis were heavily influenced by Islam and Islamicate culture and administration. By the late 18th century, Islamic political power in the region faltered due to the ascending Sikhs, with Ranjit Singh establishing a Sikh polity based in the region in 1799. After the arrival of Sikhism and emergence of a Sikh kingdom in the Punjab under Ranjit Singh, Punjabi Hindus were confronted with two religious groups attracting converts from among their fold, the Sikhs and the Muslims. However, the dilineation between Punjabi Hindus and Sikhs was difficult, due to religious syncretism being widespread. Despite some Punjabis starting to revere the Sikh gurus, the Guru Granth Sahib, and nominally being Sikh, in-actuality many maintained their traditional beliefs and practices that were more Hindu-inflected. Persons who were baptized into the Khalsa (amritdharis) tended to be more Sikh-orientated but the laypersons amongst the Sikhs maintained many Hindu influences. Some of these traditional beliefs and practices that lingered amongst the Sikhs included giving donations to Brahmins on sraadh days, observing karwa fasts, feeding dhianis (maidens), displaying and keeping iconography of Indic deities within households, burning incense, observing Hindu festivals and holidays, respecting sadhus, and venerating ancestors at their tomb (mutti).

=== Modern period ===
==== British colonial era ====
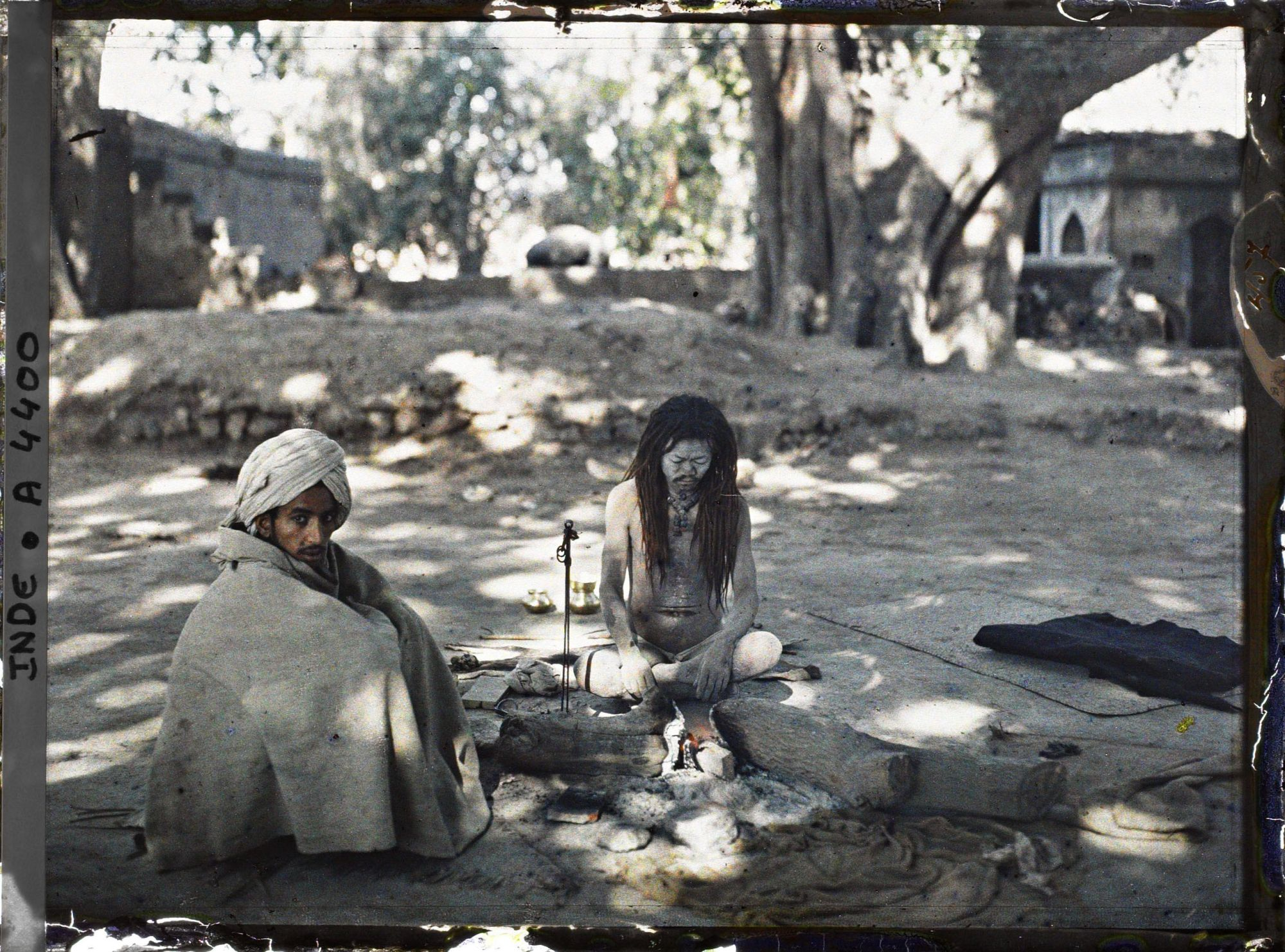
Colour photograph of a sadhu and companion sitting under a large tree in Lahore, British India in 1914, taken by Stéphane Passet

With the oncoming of colonial-rule, British influences first appeared in urban areas but for most Punjabis, remained confined only to land-revenue and legal matters. The sections of Punjabi Hindu society that were most influential during this era were the Khatris (who had assumed kshatriya status in the absence of Rajputs, a sign of the ambiguousness of the varna system in Punjab) and their associates, the Saraswat Brahmins. According to Kenneth W. Jones, Punjab was one of the three regions of the Indian subcontinent (alongside Bengal and Maharashtra) whose regional history played a special role in the consolidation of a modern Hindu identity, which began in the Punjab during the 1860s in a social setting that was partially British and partially Punjabi. Punjabi Hindus had primarily identified with their caste and its associated structures (such as jati) rather than their religion, and the onset of British-rule allowed for the development of a more regional Punjabi identity. Identifying as a Hindu alone was "too abstract, too vague, and too universal" to the commonfolk.

By the mid-19th century, Muslims accounted for around half of the Punjab region's population. During the colonial era, the practice of religious syncretism among Punjabi Hindus and Punjabi Muslims was noted and documented by officials in census reports:

"In other parts of the Province, too, traces of Hindu festivals are noticeable among the Muhammadans. In the western Punjab, Baisakhi, the new year's day of the Hindus, is celebrated as an agricultural festival, by all Muhammadans, by racing bullocks yoked to the well gear, with the beat of tom-toms, and large crowds gather to witness the show, The race is called Baisakhi and is a favourite pastime in the well-irrigated tracts. Then the processions of tazias, in Muharram, with the accompaniment of tom-toms, fencing parties and bands playing on flutes and other musical instruments (which is disapproved by the orthodox Muhammadans) and the establishment of Sabils (shelters where water and sharbat are served out) are clearly influenced by similar practices at Hindu festivals, while the illuminations on occasions like the Chiraghan fair of Shalamar (Lahore) are no doubt practices answering to the holiday-making instinct of the converted Hindus."
"Besides actual conversion, Islam has had a considerable influence on the Hindu religion. The sects of reformers based on a revolt from the orthodoxy of Varnashrama Dharma were obviously the outcome of the knowledge that a different religion could produce equally pious and right thinking men. Laxity in social restrictions also appeared simultaneously in various degrees and certain customs were assimilated to those of the Muhammadans. On the other hand the miraculous powers of Muhammadan saints were enough to attract the saint worshiping Hindus, to allegiance, if not to a total change of faith... The Shamsis are believers in Shah Shamas Tabrez of Multan, and follow the Imam, for the time being, of the Ismailia sect of Shias... they belong mostly to the Sunar caste and their connection with the sect is kept a secret, like Freemasonry. They pass as ordinary Hindus, but their devotion to the Imam is very strong."

— Excerpts from the Census of India (Punjab Province), 1911 CE

The earlier issues regarding conversions to other religions increased during the colonial-era due to Christian missionaries. Due to the unique context of the British administration in the Punjab, the administration of the colonial empire was linked to the establishment of Christian missionaries in the province. A Christian mission had already been established in Ludhiana in 1834, the first major Christian mission-station beyond Delhi in northwest India, with a press being established the next year in 1835 to disseminate Christian literature in the vernacular languages. Beyond the Sutlej, the American Presbyterian missionaries Rev. John Newton and Rev. C. W. Forman arrived in Lahore after its annexation in November 1849, with them founding a Christian mission and school there by December 1849. These Christian organizations were being supported by donations from the British within Punjab. Thus, the Punjabi commonfolk began linking the British administration with Christianity. After the 1857 Indian rebellion, Christian missionary activity in the Punjab increased further. In the 1850s, Christian missions were present in the Punjab Hills, Multan, and Attock, with their presence being found in all of the province by the 1880s, being found in places such as Delhi, Ambala, Lahore, Peshawar, the southern Afghan border, Dera Ismail Khan, Tank, Dera Ghazi Khan, Multan, the Punjab Hills, and Kashmir. The zenana missions by the Christian missionaries were controversial, with missionaries attempting to reach native women observing purdah in their own homes by sending women missionaries to such houses while the men of the home were away in the fields. In 1868, the colonial administration leased valuable, irrigated land in the Chunian tehsil of Lahore district for the purpose of building a Christian colony by the Church Missionary Society of Lahore. The Christian missionaries found the most success in the central Majha region of Punjab (such as in the Lahore, Amritsar, and Sialkot districts) and in Delhi but they were less successful in the princely-states, the west-central districts of Montgomery, Jhang, Shahpur, and the border districts of Kohat and Dera Ismail Khan. The missionary initially found converts among the Punjabi upper-class but later on most of the locals who converted were from the downtrodden sections of society, such as Chuhras, who converted on-mass, especially in Sialkot district. The Christian converts numbered 3,912 in 1881, 19,750 by 1891, 37,980 in 1901, and 163,994 by 1911, with the increasing Christian numbers creating anxiety amongst the Hindu, Muslim, and Sikhs, especially since native conversion to Christianity was highly publicized, with Christianity being viewed as a threat. The Punjabi Hindu population was around 40% of the region in the 1891 census but continuously declined in subsequent censuses. Many outcaste Hindus were converting to other religions in their attempts to seek upward social mobility and escape prejudices, initially by converting to Islam or Sikhism, later to Christianity. Rebellion failed to rid the British in 1857, therefore change came internally via reform. This would spur the formation of various reform movements within the Hindu community becoming popularized to address the perceived issues facing the Hindus.

After the annexation of Punjab, the colonial framework led to Brahmins, Baidyas, and Kayasthas, both Christians and Brahmoists, from the Bengal and North-western Provinces to move to Punjab for work in the colonial administration, bringing with them ideologies that had developed in their Bengali and Hindustani homelands. Several Brahmoist movements were prevalent in the Punjab. Bengalis and some Punjabis founded the Brahmo Samaj of Lahore in 1863, which gave the Hindus a more concrete sense of identity, the lack of which was seen as a weakness that made them vulnerable to the preachings of other religions. The four Punjabi founding members of the Brahmo Samaj in Lahore were all Hindu clerks who had ties with the Bengali community of Punjab. The Brahmo Samaj advocated for modernity and rationality. However, the Brahmo Samaj had trouble recruiting native Punjabis, thus they began to print literature in the local languages of Punjabi, Hindi, and Urdu in 1876 and established a printing-press (one of the few outside of Bengal) in Punjab in 1877. Many Brahmo figures would visit Punjab, such as Keshab Chandra Sen and Debandra Nath Tagore. However, after the conversion of Pandit Navin Chandra Rai, who founded the Adi Dharm in Lahore, to the Samaj, the local Kali temple noticed a drop in subscribers, which ignited an orthodox Hindu backlash against the Brahmo Samaj. Furthermore, regionalist factionalism was forming within the Samaj due to disagreements between its Punjabi and Bengali members, as the Bengali members were seen as too extreme and radical in their reforms to the degree that their Hinduness was questioned and began being viewed as apostates. Furthermore, the Bengali Brahmos were viewed as too tolerant of Christianity by the Punjabi Brahmos. Pandit Shiv Narain Agnihotri was another influential figure of the reformist movement, founder of the Dev Samaj, as he found the Brahmo Samaj too neutral. In 1882, Agnihotri left his job at the Educational Department and took-up the role of sanyasi at the Brahmo Mandir in Lahore. However, in 1892 Agnihotri declared to have no theistic beliefs and became inclined to scientism, re-adopting orthodox Hinduism that he had previously rejected. A proponent of the Brahmo Samaj movement was Ruchi Ram Sahini, who advocated against casteism and idolatry. Sahini founded the Young Men's Religious Association with Bhai Kashi Ram.

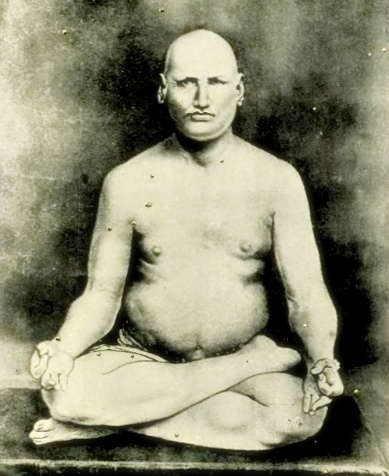
Dayananda Saraswati, circa late 19th century

The Arya Samaj ("Society of Aryans"), a Hindu reformist sect was active in propagating their message in Punjab, founded by a Gujarati Hindu named Dayananda Saraswati in Punjab in 1875. Dayananda had been influenced by the earlier Brahmo Samaj but focused his reform on the promotion of a uniquely Hindu identity distinct from other religions, motivated by the ancientness of the faith, and venerated the Sanskrit language. According to Dayananda, the Aryans of ancient India were bestowed with a divine message in Sanskrit but that Indian society and religion became corrupted over time. One example Dayananda argues for this corruption is his belief that castes (specifically varnas) were originally based upon "talents, skills, or personality" of an individual, not lineage or other hereditary aspects. Thus, Dayananda envisioned an ancient Hindu past where all Hindus had been united, with this idea later being developed by Hindutva thinkers, such as Savarkar. As per Dayananda, enemies of the Hindus were the Christians and Muslims, and to a lesser extent, Sikhs. Dayananda was fundamentalist in-regards to his belief in Hindu supremacy in India over other religious believers but he was a progressive when it came to women, caste, and child-marriage, preferring a more egaliterian society in those regards.

Dayananda enacted a religious conversion ceremony known as shuddhi that was claimed to purify a non-Hindu individual by returning them to the "religion" of their ancestors (i.e. Hinduism). The Shuddhi ceremony was based upon a Brahmin cleansing ritual after coming into contact with a lower-caste and in-theory it resembled the Christian sacrament of adult baptism. The Arya Samaj practice of shuddhi conversion brought them into conflict with Sikhs and Muslims in the Punjab who opposed this notion of returning to a hypothetical ancestral religion of one's ancestors. In one case, the Arya Samajis shaved the head of outcaste Sikhs, known as Rahtias, in their Shuddhi ceremony, which damaged Hindu-Sikh relations in the region. Furthermore, Dayananda had openly criticized the Sikh gurus and scripture, claiming Nanak was a "semi-literate preacher" and that Sikhs should join the Arya Samaj instead. This would widen the gap between Punjabi Hindus and Sikhs. Traditionalist sections of the Punjabi Hindu society, notably Brahmins, also opposed the Arya Samajis due to their rejection of caste divisions. The Arya Samajists also rejected idolatry and promoted a more philosophically aligned understanding of Hinduism that was different from the popular form of Hinduism, with them focusing on a more abstract absolute concept of divinity rather than a personal one. The Arya Samaj was pro-vegetarian, as vegetarianism was a marker for upper-castes, leading to the adoption of a vegetarian diet amongst the Punjabi masses. Thus, adoption of vegetarianism was a way to achieve higher social mobility. This change also influenced the decision to mandate only vegetarian food at Sikh langars.

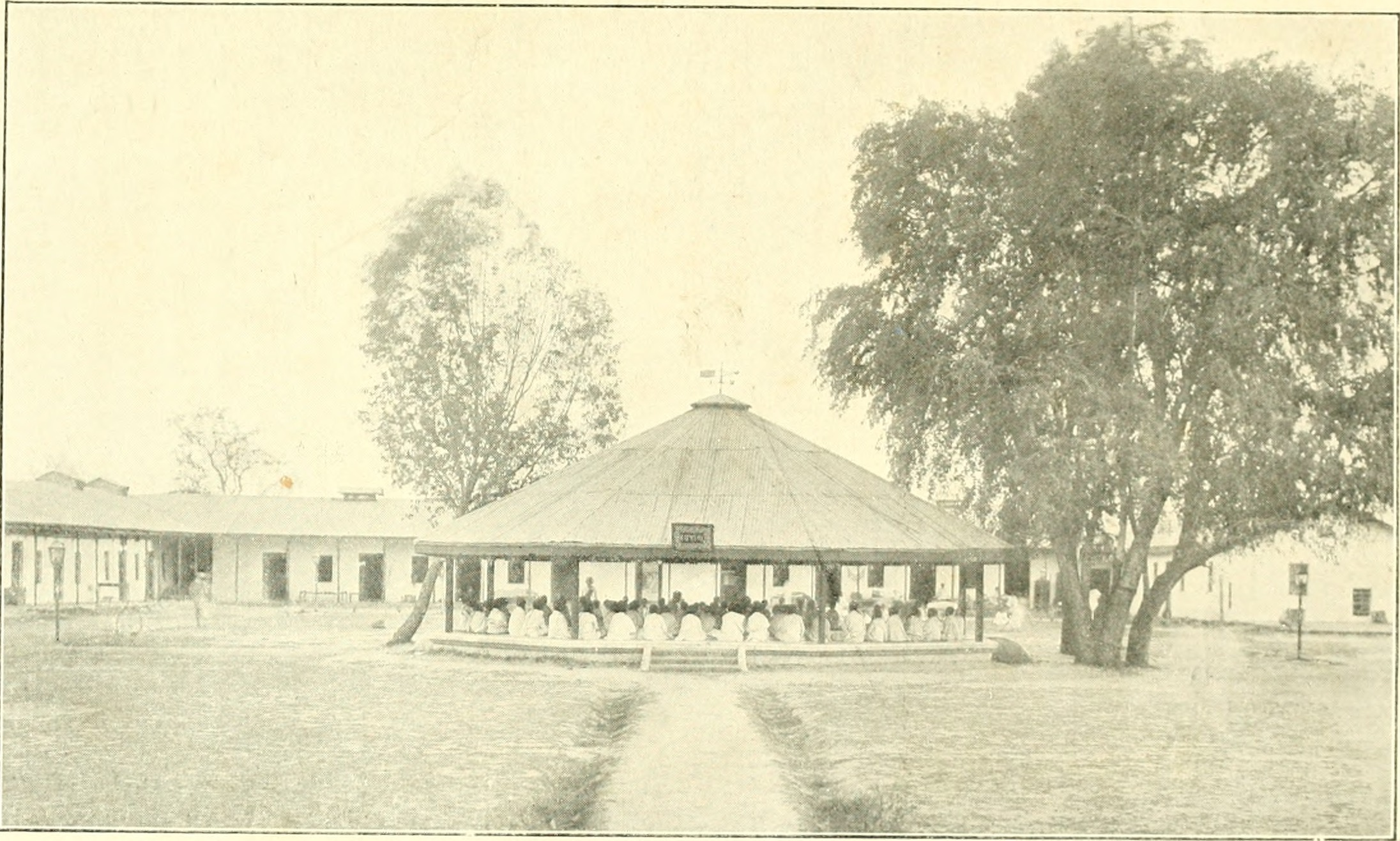
Arya Samaj gurukul boys performing a homa ritual, c. 1915

By the late 19th century, the Arya Samaj was well-rooted in the Punjab (including in Lahore, which had been a stronghold of traditional Hinduism). The Arya Samaj was influenced by the British and regional culture. The Arya Samaj eventually became more successful than the Brahmo Samaj in Punjab. According to Kumar, the Arya Samaj was successful because it successfully enjoined the idea of the Hindu past with their new, Anglicised reality. The Arya Samaj focused on creating an educated elite-class with esteem being given to Vedic knowledge. The organisation would produce much literature. Prominent Indian nationalists from Punjab, such as Lala Lajpat Rai, belonged to the Arya Samaj. In the 1890s, an educated Punjabi Hindu elite had emerged in the mercantile and professional circles in urban areas of the province, such as at Lahore, who began to question the traditionalist takes on their religion. This educated group of doctors, engineers, and educationists were attracted to the Arya Samaj's mission. The Arya Samaj was originally decentralized but after its founder's death, numerous organisations and educational institutions were founded claiming to carry-on his mission and to combat Christian evangelism. One of these samaj groups was the Lahore Samaj, which had been formulated by 6 December 1883, being led by Lala Hans Raj in 1885 who worked without pay. Later in June 1886, the Dayanand Anglo-Vedic Managing Committee (D.A.V.) in Lahore was founded by Lala Hans Raj and Pandit Gurudatta Vidhyarthi. On 18 May 1889, the DAV school became affiliated with Punjab University. The DAV school in Lahore served as a model for other local chapters of the Arya Samaj to base the elementary and secondary schools they founded in their locality on. In 1893, the Arya Samaj was divided into two factions: the conservatives and the moderates. The conservaties were led by Gurudatta and controlled most of the local Arya Samaj chapters and the Arya Pratinidhi Sabha, Punjab. Meanwhile, the moderates maintained control over the Managing Committee and the DAV school.

An urban and rural divide occurred in Punjabi society during the late 19th and early 20th centuries. Various peasant movements arose regarding water rates, administration and legislation regarding the canal colonies, and agriculture. The Punjabi Hindu money-lenders had benefited from the changes to agriculture that came under colonialism, such as commercialization, the revenue-system, and the introduction of private property. However, the introduction of the Land Alienation Act after demands by peasant proprietors weakened the urbanite Punjabi Hindu traders as its restricted ownership of agricultural land to certain "agriculturalist" castes. Relations between the various religious groups of Punjab worsed by 1910 over competition for employment. This shift was characterized by more animosity between Hindus and Sikhs in Punjab. The Sikhs were undergoing their Singh Sabha and Gurdwara Reform movements, focusing on a distinct Sikh identity that alienated Punjabi Hindus. The Singh Sahbaists' reforms led to the abandonment of many Brahminical influences amongst the Sikh laity. Many Sikhs stopped visiting Hindu temples and started going to Sikh temples instead, undergoing the pahul initiation ceremony to become Khalsa. There was a generational passing of leadership from Sikhs who had been alive in the 19th-century and still held onto traditional Hindu customs to a newer generation of reformist Sikhs who were more orthodox. Due to the Gurdwara Reform movement in the 1920s, many formerly Hindu deras were legally changed by definition to Sikh gurdwaras. To avoid being usurped by reformist Sikhs, many Hindu places of worship in Punjab removed the Guru Granth Sahib from their premises to prevent being legally declared a Sikh place of worship, which would forfeit ownership of said site to a Sikh body. The British fanned communal tensions by setting the Chief Khalsa Diwan and Indian nationalists against one another and by preferentially recruiting Sikhs into the armed forces and bestowing martial-race status upon them. Master Tara Singh and an educated class of Sikhs took on the mantle of leadership for the whole Sikh community, uniting urban and rural Sikhs, with them further highlighting Sikhs' distinction from Hinduism.

The Hindus felt that the Sikhs were being appeased by the British due to the large role that the Sikhs played in the British Indian military whilst the Muslims were favoured by the British due to their demographics, where as Hindu interests were ignored in Punjab by the colonial authorities. The Hindu educated class opposed the decision to create a separate electorate for Muslims in the province when representational government was introduced at the district and later provincial level in Punjab. Furthermore, the urban Hindus were upset at special quotas in higher education and jobs being given to Muslims in the province. In the canal colonies, government grants were mostly given to Muslim and Sikh Jats, whilst the Hindu money-lenders were disregarded. One of the reasons for this was due to caste biases within the colonial administration, which considered Hindus to not be ideal cultivators. Another reason was to ensure the land was being used for agricultural productivity rather than being traded like a commodity for financial benefit. In the urban areas, the Hindus felt unrepresented yet the Hindus in rural areas had formed mutually beneficial political relationships with the Muslim and Sikh landlords. The Hindu landlords joined forces with the Muslim and Sikh landlords in the formation of the Unionist Party, which protected the class interests of rural elites. Due to the communalist and class divides based on religion present in Punjab, the Indian Congress was not able to form a strong-hold in the province, with a weak nationalist presence existing, with Lahore being dominated by the Arya Samaj. Gokul Chand Narang in the Daily Milap (24 October 1936) suggested that the lack of Hindu influence in Punjab was due to Hindus being too externally focused and he suggested that they focus more on their religion and internal struggles.

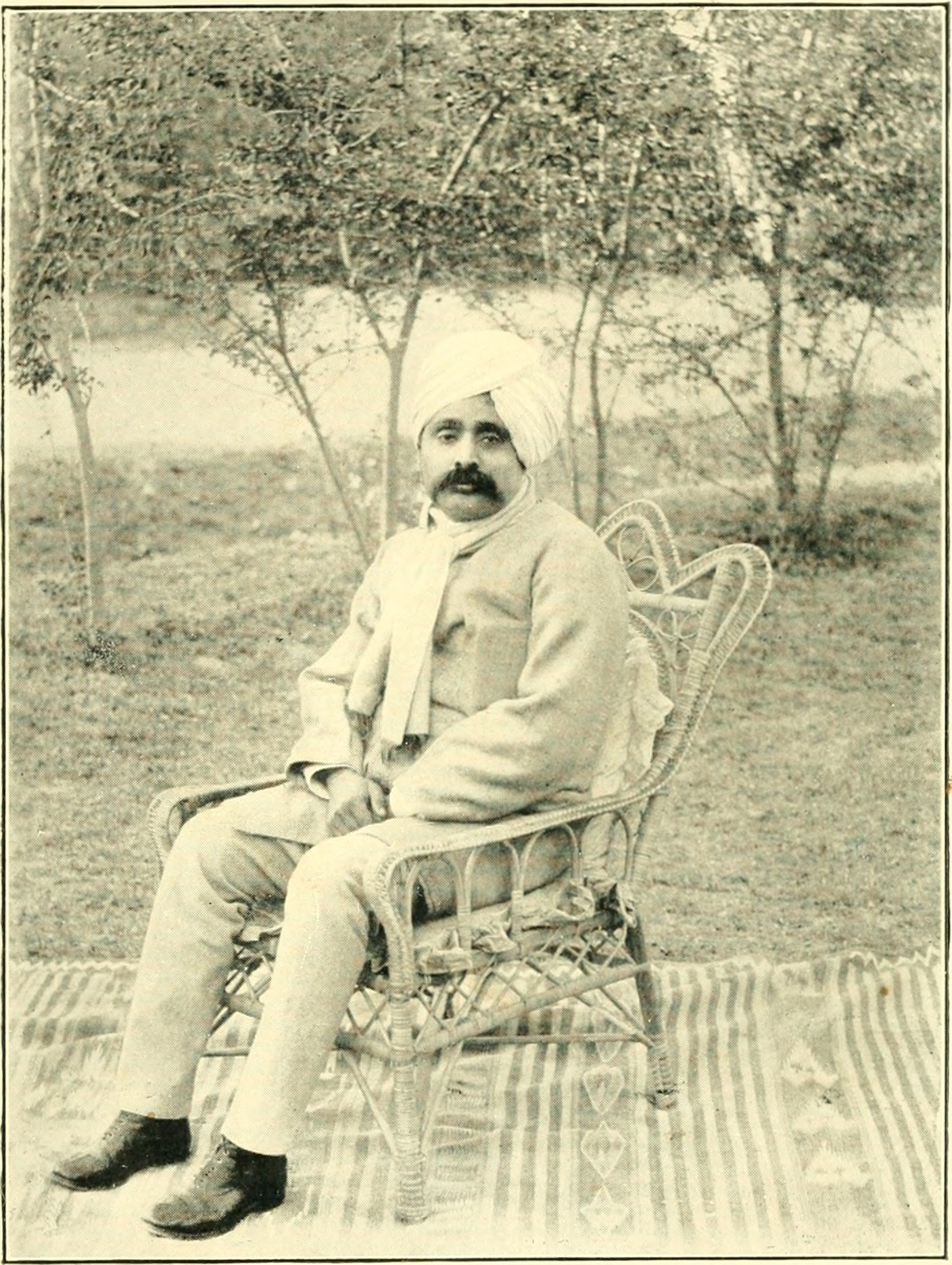
Lala Lajpat Rai, 1908

In the early part of the 20th century, the Samaj and organisations inspired by it, such as Jat-Pat Todak Mandal, were active in campaigning against caste discrimination. The mandal operated its conferences out of the residence of Gokul Chand Narang at 5 Montgomery Road in Lahore. In 1935, the mandal invited B. R. Ambedkar to give a lecture in Lahore on the issue of caste but cancelled the planned event when they learnt that Ambedkar believed that a fundamental way to rid India of caste discrimination was to eliminate the "religious notions" on which it was based upon. Ambedkar would later publish his views a year later in 1936 in his work The Annihilation of Caste. Other activities in which the Samaj engaged included campaigning for the acceptance of widow remarriage and women's education. Lala Lajpat Rai was pivotal for organizing the Punjabi Hindus as a consolidated community and identity for social-change and protest. Lajpat Rai and Ajit Singh launched an anti-colonial movement in Punjab. Lajpat Rai was one of the few nationalist leaders in Punjab at the time but he died in November 1928.

In the early 20th century the Punjabi Hindus were also influenced by the promotion of Shivaji as a Hindu national hero under the guise of B. G. Tilak and the book The Indian War of Independence by Sarvarkar promoting the 1857 rebellion as a nationalist movement. The 18th-century figure Haqiqat Rai was imagined as a Punjabi Hindu religious martyr. The Indian Congress Party became influenced by Hindu revivalism, with many of the Hindu Congressmen in Punjab playing a role in the cow protection movement and the founding of the Hindu Sabha in December 1915 at Allahabad. The Arya Samaj was involved in the Sangathan movement in the 1920s.

==== 1947 Partition ====
Approximately 3 million Punjabi Hindus migrated from West Punjab and North-West Frontier Province (present-day Pakistan) to East Punjab and Delhi (present-day India) during the partition of India.

This split the former British province of Punjab between the Dominion of India and the Dominion of Pakistan. The mostly Muslim western part of the province became Pakistan's Punjab province; the mostly Sikh and Hindu eastern part became India's East Punjab state (later divided into the new states of Punjab, Haryana and Himachal Pradesh). Many Hindus and Sikhs lived in the west, and many Muslims lived in the east, and the fears of all such minorities were so great that the partition saw many people displaced and much intercommunal violence. Some have described the violence in Punjab as a retributive genocide.

The newly formed governments had not anticipated, and were completely unequipped for, a two-way migration of such staggering magnitude, and massive violence and slaughter occurred on both sides of the new India-Pakistan border. Estimates of the number of deaths vary, with low estimates at 200,000 and high estimates at 2,000,000. The worst case of violence among all regions is concluded to have taken place in Punjab. These Punjabi Hindu refugees from West Punjab settled in East Punjab, Delhi, or Mumbai.

==== Punjabi Suba and trifurcation of Punjab ====
After the partition, Sikh leaders, such as Master Tara Singh, and political parties demanded a "Punjabi Suba" (Punjabi Province) where Punjabi language written in the Gurumukhi script would be the language of the state in northern India. Language-politics would characterise the associated developments. Punjabi Hindus affiliated to the Arya Samaj and Jana Sangh believed it was a political/religious movement (an attempt to establish a Sikh theocratic state under the guise of creating a Punjabi-speaking state) rather than a linguistic one and instead advocated for Maha Punjab despite language differences. The Punjabi Hindus recorded their mother-tongue as Hindi despite them actually speaking Punjabi or having Punjabi origins.

At the instigation of the Arya Samaj, many Punjabi Hindus in present-day Ambala, Una, and Sirsa stated Hindi as their mother tongue in the censuses of 1951 and 1961. Some areas of the erstwhile East Punjab state where Hindi, Haryanvi, and Western Pahari-speaking Hindus formed the majority, became part of the newly created states of Haryana and Himachal Pradesh where Hindi was declared the state language. This was in contrast with the primarily Punjabi-speaking locals in some regions of the newly created states. A direct result of the trifurcation of East Punjab into three states made Punjab a Sikh-majority state in India.

==== Religious relations ====
According to Pramod Kumar, communalist political parties were prevalent in Punjab after independence but tensions were limited as the state was experiencing prosperity and development due to a favourable economy, agriculture, education, industry, infrastructure, and employment, highlighted by the Green Revolution. The Punjab Pradesh Congress was passive in their communalism whilst the Akali Dal, the Jana Sangh, the Arya Samaj had been actively communalist. Pratap Singh Kairon gave favour to both Hindus and Sikhs but he interfered in the elections of the Sikh body, the Shiromani Gurdwara Parbandhak Committee, which politicised religion further in Punjab. The passing of leadership and death of the generation of leaders who had secured India's independence from the British by the mid-1960s meant that the leadership had passed onto a new generation of leaders who were more communal. The Akali Dal had split in 1962, leaving the party increasingly under the influence of the Jat peasantry. In 1972, Giani Zail Singh came to power but communalist politics developed further during his tenure. Political leaders advocated for the benefit of their religious community, not for the benefit of Punjab and its population as a whole. According to Pramod Kumar, the prosperity experienced in the state led to the development of an urban Hindu and Sikh bourgeouis of traders and capitalists that competed with one another. In the rural areas, a rural Jat bourgeoisie also formed due to their political emancipation and subsequent investing of surplus into industrial production. The urban Hindu, urban Sikhs, and rural Jats came into conflict with one another in such an environment.

Earlier movements demanding territorial, agricultural, economic, and language goals for Punjab were mostly led by Sikhs and when the demands were not met, the sense of discrimination that Sikhs perceived in India was strengthened. Pramod Kumar describes the process as a type of politicization of religion and formation of a communal consciousness, drawing upon perceived historical injustices or events. Some Hindu groups, such as the Vishva Hindu Parishad, claimed that Sikhs were a type of Hindu, which led to divisions between the two groups as Sikhs rejected that idea and promoted fundamentalism within their ranks to support their separate identity. Punjabi Sikhs and Punjabi Hindus had a complicated relationship. Many Punjabi Sikhs had claimed that they were the protectors of the Punjabi Hindus, which was rejected by the Hindus as insinuating that they were protege. Sikhs perceived themselves as victims of the central government, which they associated with Hindus. Punjabi Hindus were wary of Punjabi Sikh aspirations for nationhood, fearing a Sikh domination of the Punjab and their subsequent maginalization as a result. As a result, Sikhs identitfied more with Punjabi regionalism whilst Hindus identified more with the Indian nation. The Hindus felt that the government appeased the Sikhs in politics and employment. A common criticism lodged against the Hindus was that the Punjabi Hindus abandoned the Punjabi language, culture, and traditions but Pramod Kumar questions the basis of this accusation as Punjabi Hindus continued to use Punjabi as their language and did not adopt Hindi, despite attempts to do so. In the 1981 census, the vast majority of Punjabi Hindus recorded their language as Punjabi. Regarding the matter of conferring holy-city status onto Amritsar, the Hindu representatives to the discussion were Gopi Chand Bhatia, president of the Durgiana Mandir, Bhola Nath Dilawari of the Arya Samaj, O. P. Prabhakar, and Ram Prakash Seth while the Sikh representatives were Amrik Singh and Harminder Singh Sandhu, whom were president and general-secretary of the All-India Sikh Students' Federation. The Hindu side proposed the condition that the sale of meat and alcohol be banned in the city, which the Sikhs agreed to.

==== 21st century ====
Today, Punjabi Hindus make up approximately 38.5% population of present Punjab State of India. A recent push has been for a Hindu Temple Act to address temple mismanagement.

== Demographics ==
=== India ===
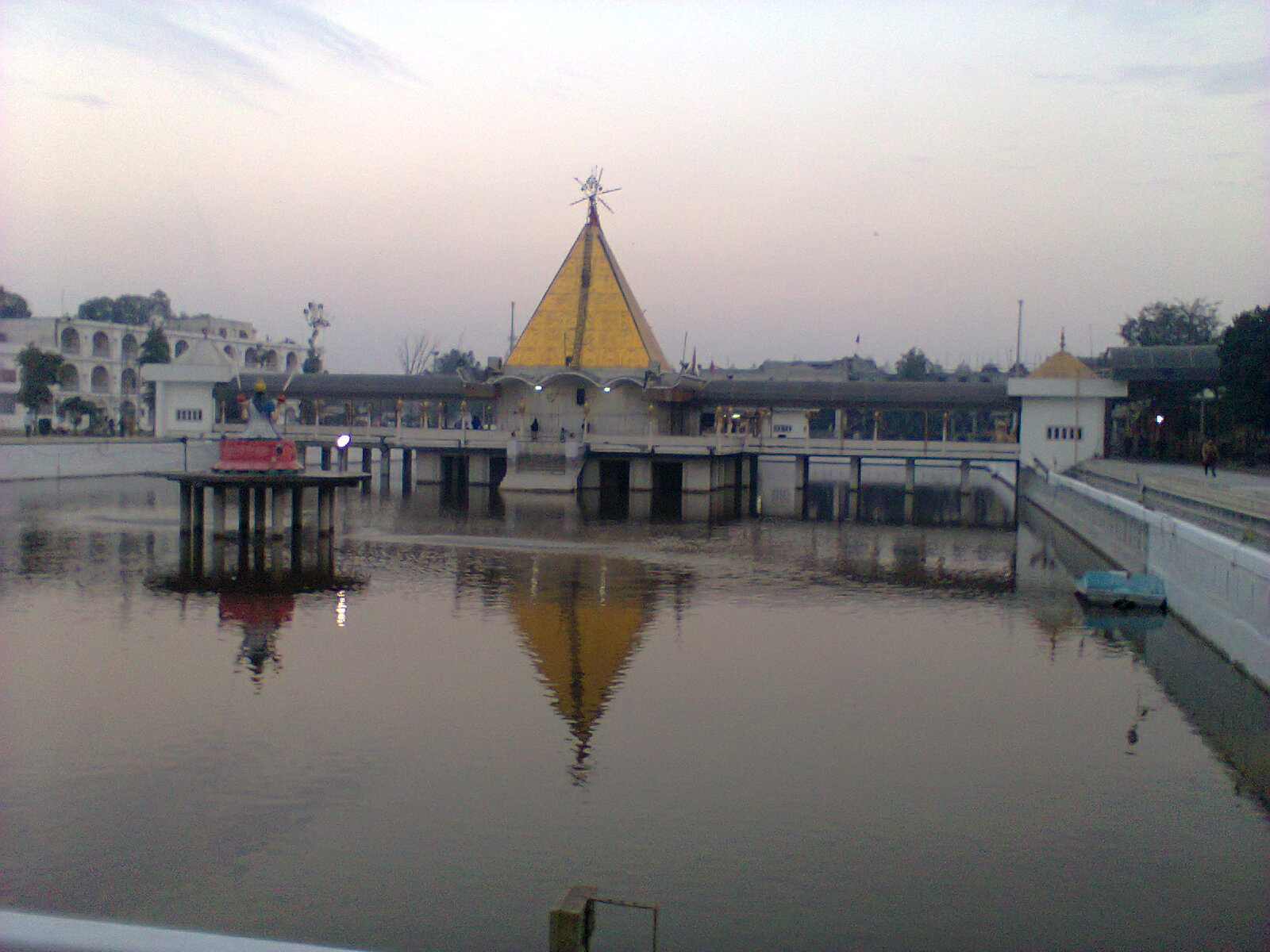
Devi Talab Mandir in Jalandhar, Punjab, India.

In the Indian state of Punjab, Punjabi Hindus make up approximately 38.5% of the state's population; numbering 10.7 million and are a majority in the Doaba region. Punjabi Hindus form a majority in five districts of Punjab, namely, Pathankot, Jalandhar, Hoshiarpur, Fazilka and Shaheed Bhagat Singh Nagar districts.

During the 1947 partition, many Hindus from West Punjab and North-West Frontier Province settled in Delhi. Determined from 1991 and 2015 estimates, Punjabi Hindus form approximately 24 to 35 percent of Delhi's population; based on 2011 official census counts out of a total population of 16.8 million, this amounts to between 4 and 5.9 million people.

Punjabi Hindus form between approximately 8 and 10 percent of Haryana's population; based on 2011 official census counts out of a total population of 25.4 million, this amounts to between 2.03 and 2.54 million people. Similar to Delhi, most Punjabi Hindus in Haryana can trace their ancestry to West Punjab and North-West Frontier Province due to mass migration associated with the 1947 partition. In the contemporary era, Punjabi Hindus are influential in the state politics.

Punjabi language as a mother tongue in Haryana (Note: Including speakers of Standard Punjabi and Western Punjabi (Lahnda))
| Subdivision | 1881 census | | 1931 census | | 1961 census | | 1971 census | |
| Subdivision | Population | Percentage | Population | Percentage | Population | Percentage | Population | Percentage |
|---|---|---|---|---|---|---|---|---|
| Ambala district | 351,418 | 32.93% | 264,521 | 35.61% | 418,656 | 30.48% | 153,142 | 13.94% |
| Hisar district (Note: 1881 census count includes Sirsa District, which was later amalgamated with Hissar District.) | 196,808 | 25.98% | 219,718 | 24.43% | 178,802 | 11.61% | 314,829 | 14.76% |
| Jind State/Jind district | 66,339 | 26.55% | 66,688 | 20.54% | —N/a | —N/a | 20,033 | 3.13% |
| Kalsia State | 28,168 | 41.6% | 10,551 | 17.63% | —N/a | —N/a | —N/a | —N/a |
| Karnal district | 26,580 | 4.27% | 16,430 | 1.93% | 198,292 | 13.3% | 279,421 | 14.1% |
| Rohtak district | 561 | 0.1% | 526 | 0.07% | 14,302 | 1.01% | 33,000 | 1.85% |
| Gurgaon district | 343 | 0.05% | 899 | 0.12% | 19,270 | 1.55% | 40,003 | 2.34% |
| Dujana State | 8 | 0.03% | 15 | 0.05% | —N/a | —N/a | —N/a | —N/a |
| Pataudi State | 2 | 0.01% | 1 | 0.01% | —N/a | —N/a | —N/a | —N/a |
| Loharu State | 0 | 0% | 16 | 0.07% | —N/a | —N/a | —N/a | —N/a |
| Mahendragarh district | —N/a | —N/a | —N/a | —N/a | 2,895 | 0.53% | 3,444 | 0.5% |
| Total Punjabi language population | 670,227 | 16.69% | 579,365 | 12.89% | 832,217 | 10.93% | 843,872 | 8.41% |
| Total Haryana population | 4,015,386 | 100% | 4,495,730 | 100% | 7,613,362 | 100% | 10,036,808 | 100% |

=== Pakistan ===
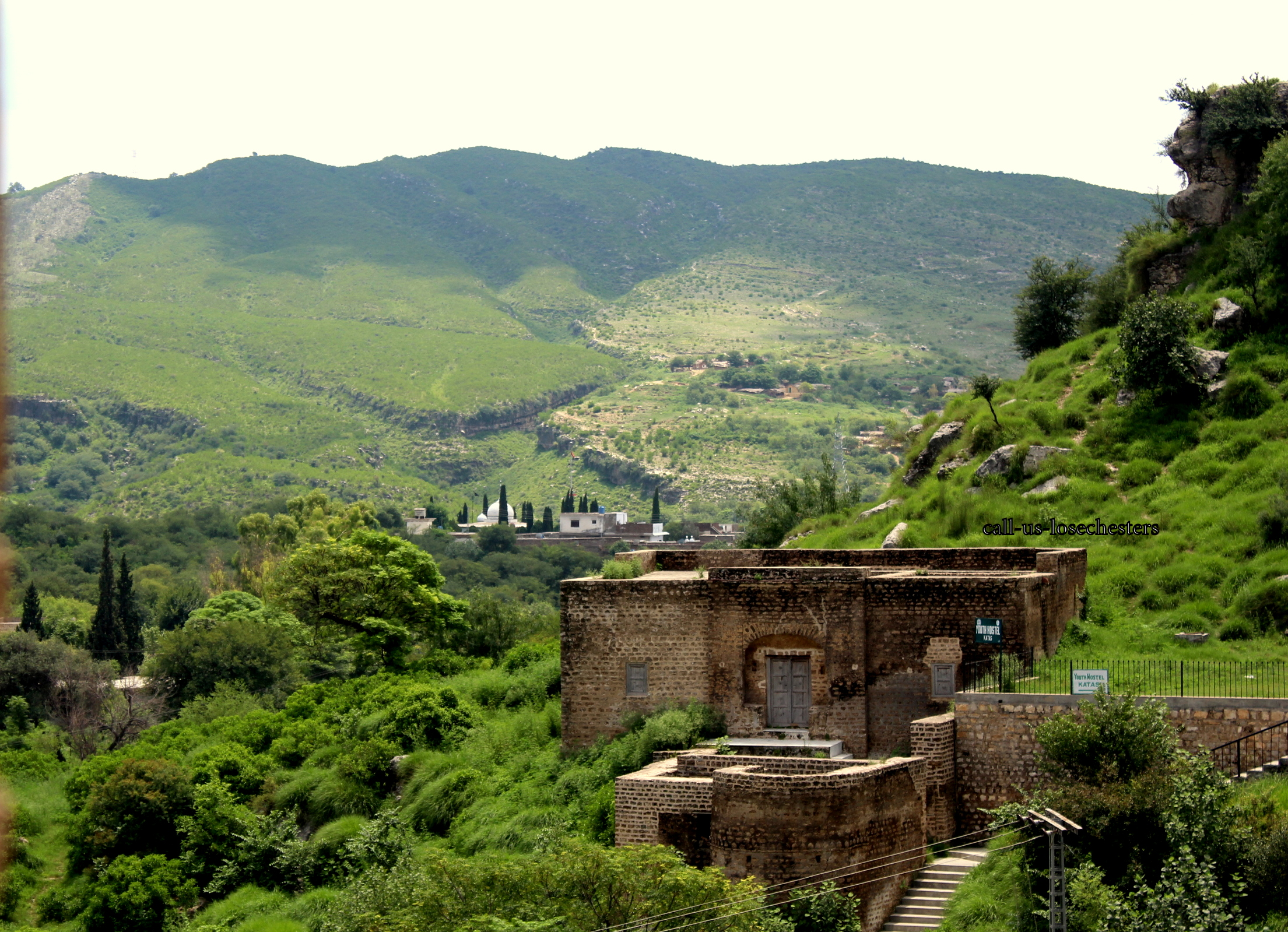
Katas Raj Temples in Chakwal District, Punjab, Pakistan.

Following the large-scale exodus that took place during the 1947 partition, there remains a small Punjabi Hindu community in Pakistan today. According to the 2017 Census, there are 249,716 Hindus in Punjab province, forming approximately 0.2% of the total population. Much of the community resides in the primarily rural South Punjab districts of Rahim Yar Khan and Bahawalpur where they form 3.17% and 1.14% of the population respectively, while the rest are in the districts of Sialkot, Lahore, Bahawalnagar etc. In 2006, the last functioning Hindu temple in Lahore, once the cultural capital of Punjabi Hindus, was rumoured to have been destroyed to make way for a multi-story commercial building, but the rumour was false. The Krishna Mandir still functions today in Lahore, along with the Valmiki Mandir.

=== Diaspora ===
Large diaspora communities exist in many countries including in Canada, the Gulf countries, Australia, the United States, and the United Kingdom. 35% of the Punjabi diaspora in the United Kingdom are Hindus. Many of the Punjabi Hindus in the UK are "twice migrants", who arrived from East Africa. While caste remains amongst the first generation diaspora, it becomes much less relevant by the second generation but was still important in-regards to marriage. The role of caste may decrease further in later generations as the acquired culture becomes more influential than the inherited culture of the diaspora.

== Culture and religion ==
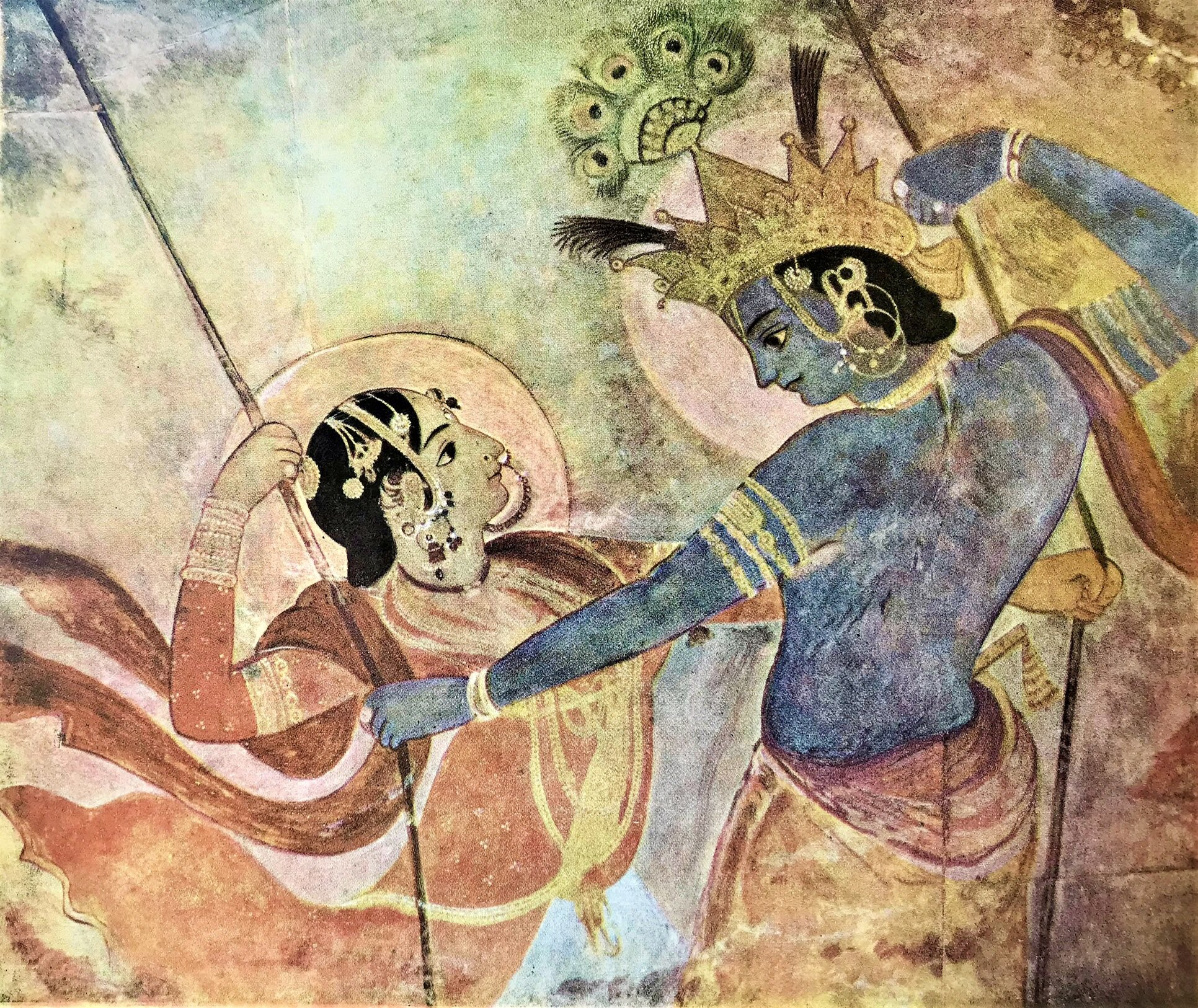
Fresco of Radha Krishna painted in the early 19th century on the walls of the Maiyanatha Thakurdwara in Katra Dulo, Amritsar, Punjab, India.

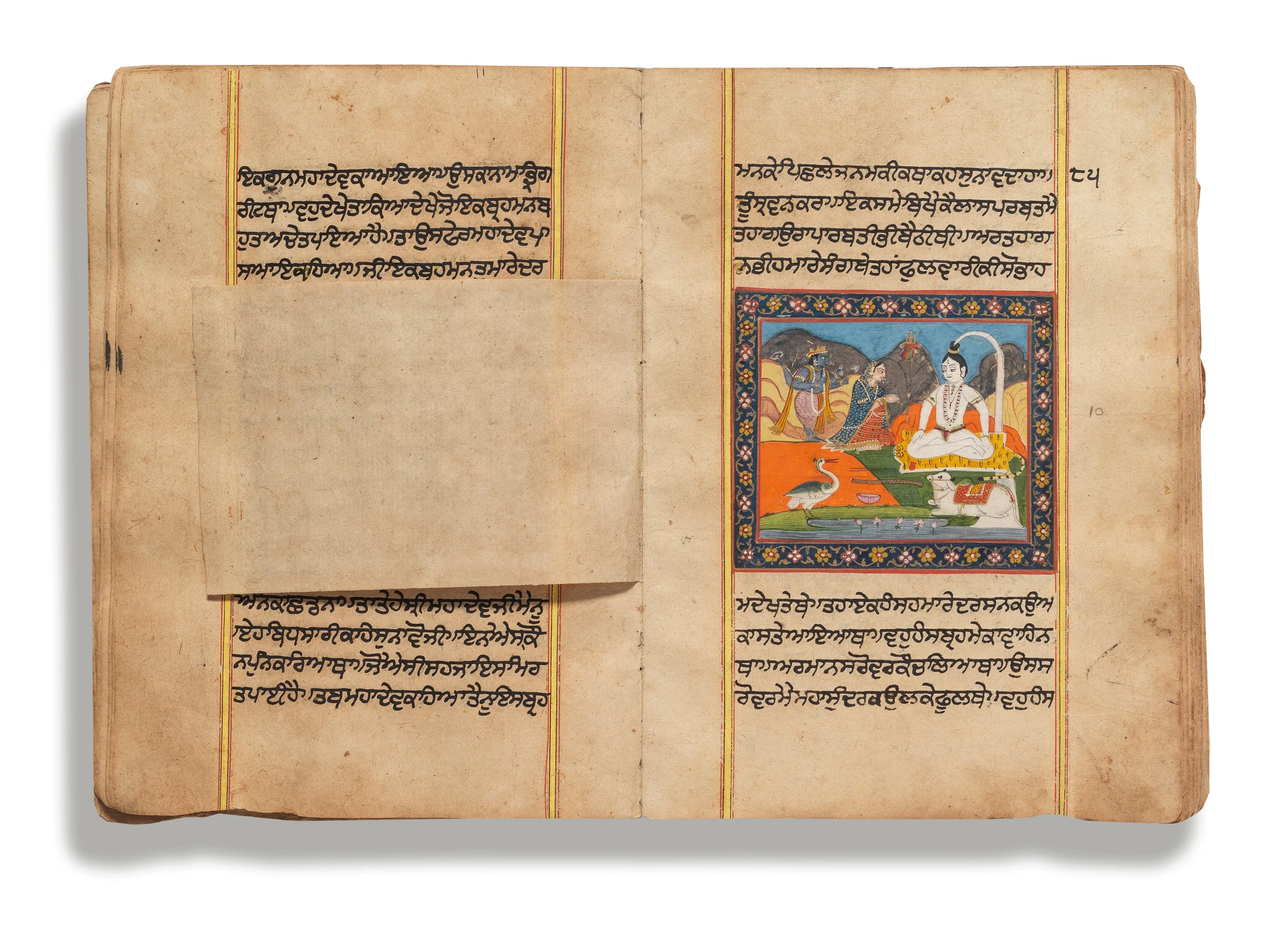
A Hindu illustrated manuscript written in Gurmukhi script with paintings inside.

As in many other parts of India, Hinduism in Punjab has adapted over time and has become a synthesis of culture and history.

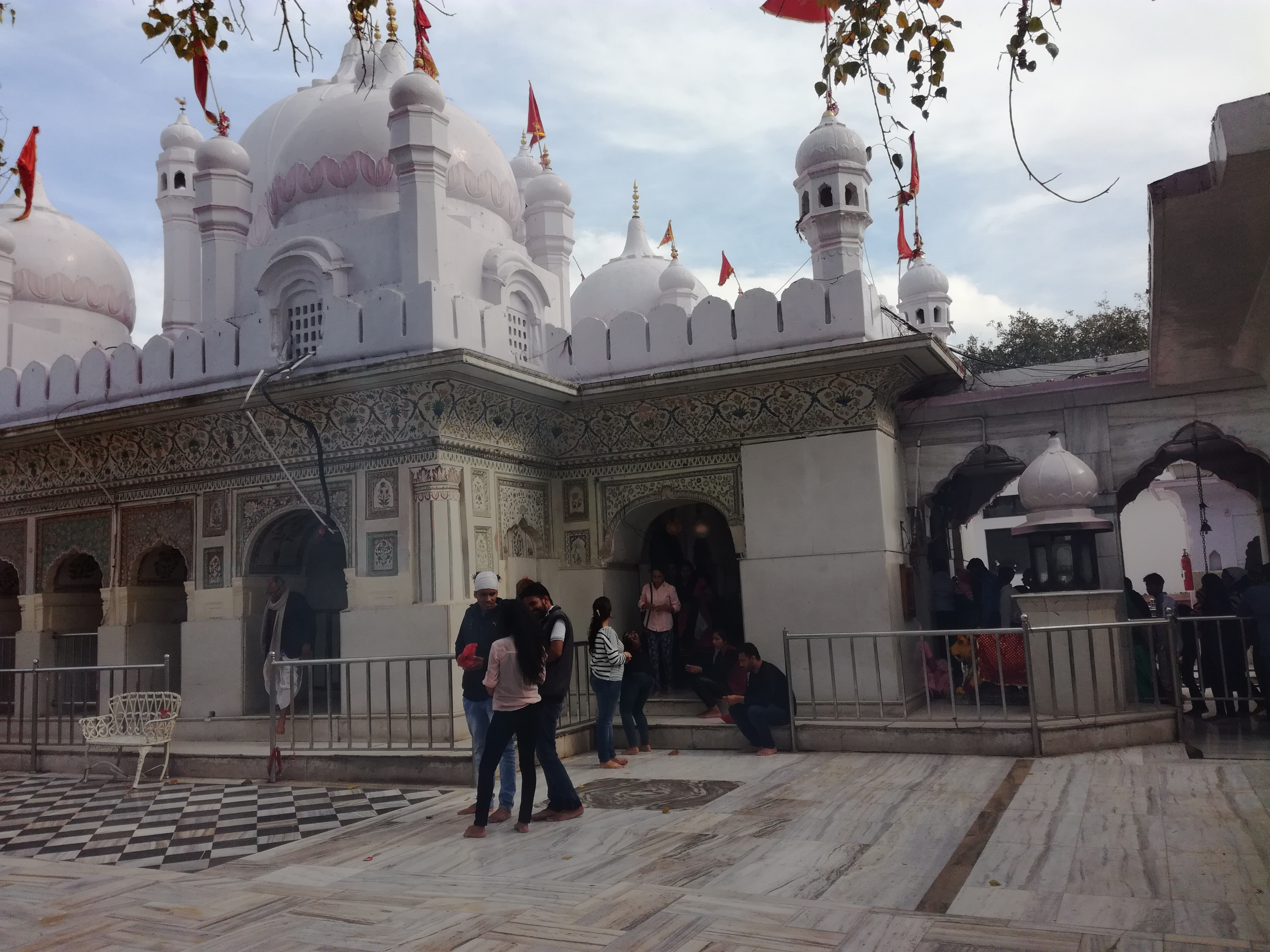
Mata Mansa Devi Mandir, Panchkula, Haryana, India

As Hindus believe that dharma is universal and evolves with time, many Hindus also value other spiritual paths and religious traditions. They believe that any traditions that are equally able to nurture one's atman should be accepted and taught. Hinduism itself encourages any being to reach their own self-realization in their own unique way either through bhagavan or through other means of devotion and meditation.

The Punjabi Hindus continue heterogeneous religious practices in spiritual kinship with Sikhism. This not only includes veneration of the Sikh gurus in private practice but also visits to Sikh gurdwaras in addition to Hindu temples.

According to Anjali Gera Roy, the Hindu Punjabis of Western Punjab settled away from their ancestral homeland during 1947 partition, speak a hybrid language based on Punjabi and Hindi (or Hindi with Punjabi accent).

=== Udasis ===
Udasi is a religious sect of ascetic sadhus centered in the Punjab region. The Udasis were key interpreters of the Sikh philosophy and the custodians of important Sikh shrines until the Akali movement. They brought many converts into the Sikh fold during the 18th and the early 19th centuries. However, their religious practices border on a syncretism of Sikhism and Hinduism. When the Singh Sabha, dominated by Tat Khalsa Sikhs, redefined the Sikh identity in the early 20th century, the Udasi mahants were expelled from the Sikh shrines. Since then, the Udasis have increasingly regarded themselves as Hindus rather than Sikhs.

=== Nanakpanthis ===
Numerous Punjabi Hindus are Nanakpanthi, who revere Guru Nanak alongside their Hindu deities but without following the other gurus, and nor identify as Sikhs in terms of religious affiliation; at the time of the 1891 census of British Punjab, it has been estimated that, out of the 1.8 million Sikhs around 579,000 were Hindu Nanakpanthis, but in later classifications the definitions of "Hindu" and "Sikh" would be more precise and the Hindu Nanakpanthis would stop being counted as "Sikhs".

=== Arya Samaj ===
The Arya Samaj was a Hindu reformist organization founded in the 1870s by Dayananda Saraswati, and while he was from Gujarat, the movement had a lot of influence among Punjabi Hindus, especially the Khatris and Aroras, the Arya Samajis being social reformers who aimed to promote monotheism and were against what they called "supersititions" such as idolatry, wanted to raise the literacy rates (especially for women) and were fighting caste discrimination.

== Temples ==
Punjabi Hindu temples historically had various names depending on the associated denomination, such as Shivala (Shaivist temple, also known as a Shivdwara), Devidwara (Shaktist temple), or Thakurdwara (Vaishnavist temple). Thakurdwara complexes often had a samadh (samadhi) mausoleum dedicated to the founder of the temple and a dharamsala (building for accommodating pilgrims and ascetics, such as bairagis). Devidwaras were devoted to the worship of the devi (goddesses). Temples often have various deities as their central focus in the form of a murti (idol), with there being no general uniformity in this regard. Hindu worshipping practices at a temple are more individualistic in-nature rather than congregational.

=== Temple architecture ===
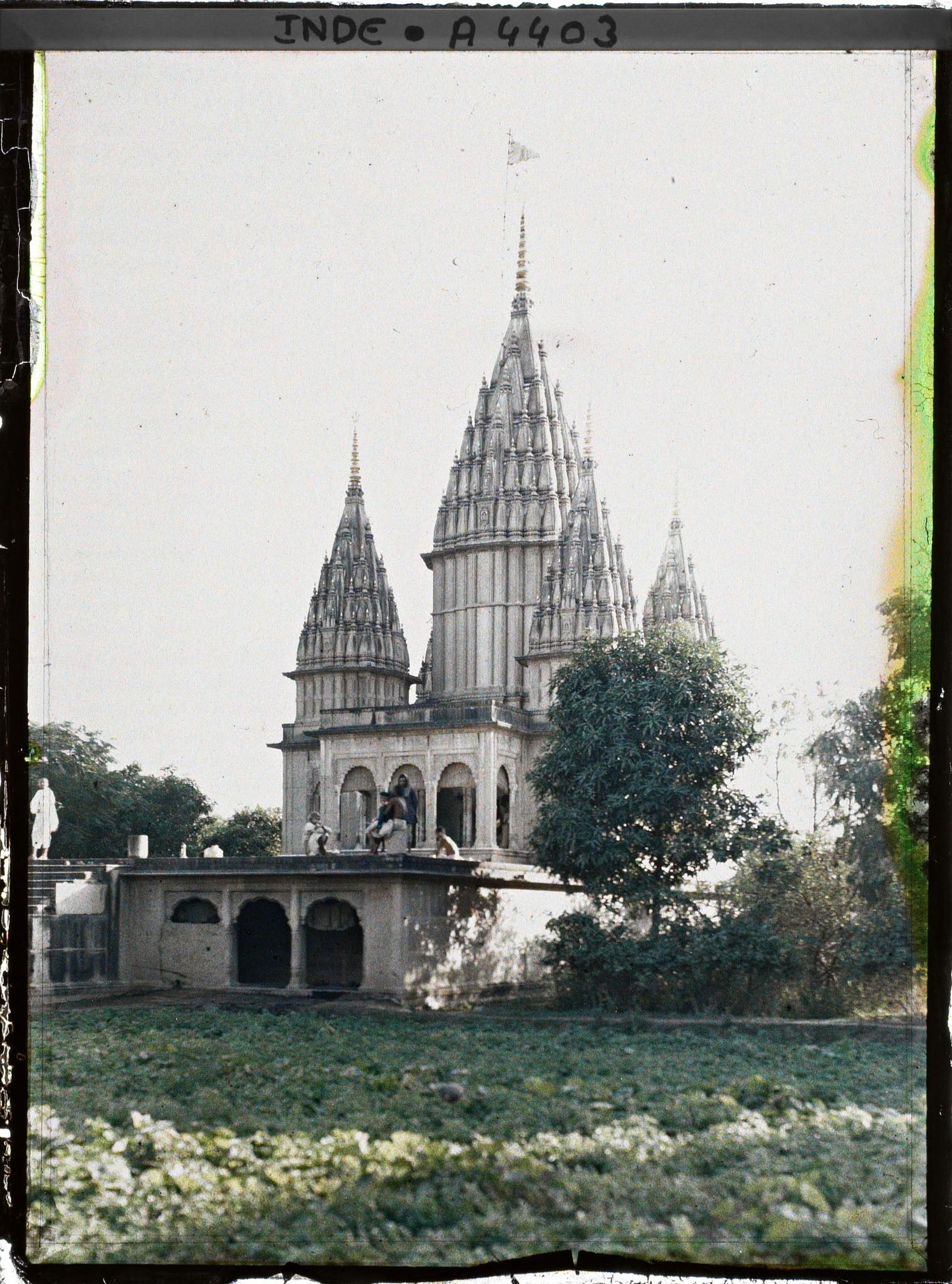
True-colour photograph - Lahore, British India. A Hindu temple, possibly Shaivite, 1914

Punjabi Hindu temples consist of three architectural features: a shikhara (dome), mandapa (pillard hall where the devotees pray), and garbhagriha (sanctum santorum where the murti is placed). The main room or area of a temple will house the deity in the form of a murti, with this space being known as garbhagriha, which is the "heart" or inner-most point of the temple. Also, there is a passageway that allows for circuambulation of the garbha griha space, which is a requirement after prayers are given. Architecturally, there is usually a dome or spire structure built over the garbha griha. Another feature is a small passageway called the antrala (vestibule), which connects the garbhagriha and mandapa spaces together. The mandapa is a pavilion that allows the devotees to congregate. Temples are built on a raised, staired platform with one entryway, with the entrance-porch being called a ardh-mandapa.

== Literature ==
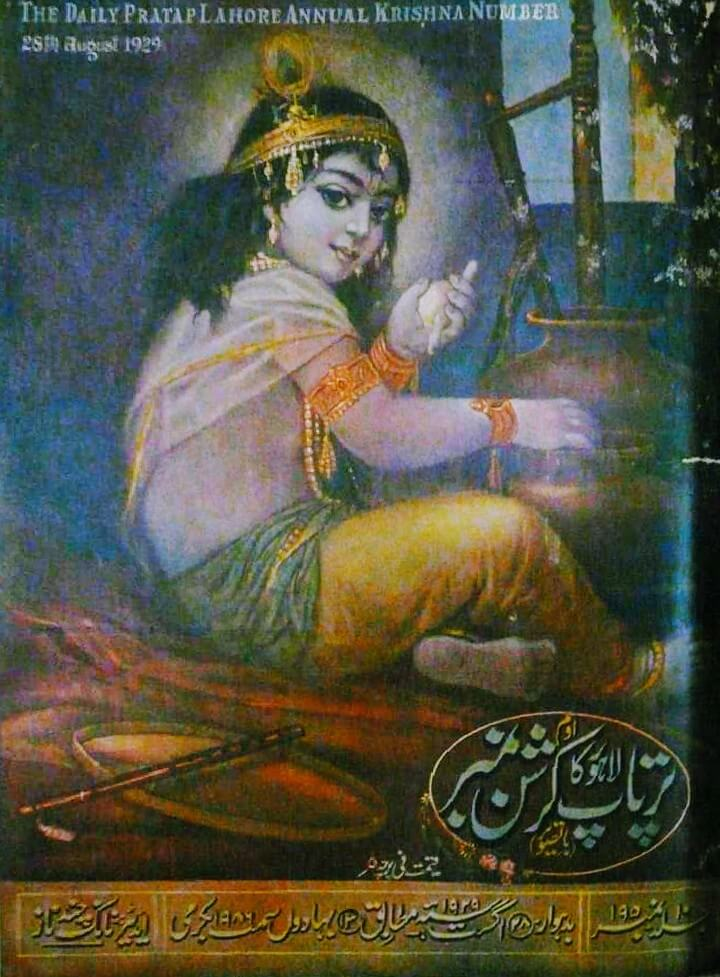
Depiction of Krishna, cover-artwork for the Daily Pratap's special edition on Krishna (29 August 1929)

A surviving example of Old Punjabi prose is the Ekadashi Mahatam work. During the colonial-era, the Punjab's administrative language was Urdu. Urdu was not challenged by Hindi and Devanagari proponents in Punjab like it was in the United Provinces and Bihar, thus Hindu Punjabis readily utilized the Urdu language in their literature. Some Punjabi periodicals in Lahore popular with Hindus were the Milap, Pratap, and Bande Matram. The Hindu newspapers published Urdu poetry that drew upon both Perso-Islamic and Indic literary influences, consisting of local and Persianized metaphors. The subject of poems were often religious martyrs, festivals, or natural landscapes. Meanwhile, periodicals in the city that were more popular with Muslim inhabitants were the Zamindar and Inqilab. After the partition of Punjab in 1947, the Milap periodical continues to be published in Indian Punjab. A Punjabi Hindu writer active in the colonial period was Shardha Ram, who wrote in various languages and wrote the first modern Hindi novel Bhagyavati in 1877 in Punjab.

== See also ==
- Punjabi Sikhs
- Punjabi Muslims
- Punjabi Christians
- History of Punjab
- List of Punjabi Hindus
- Hinduism in Punjab, Pakistan
- List of Hindu temples in India
- Bhabra
- List of Hindu festivals in Punjab
- East Punjab
- Hindu period in Lahore

== Sources ==
- Brass, Paul Richard (1974). Language, Religion and Politics in North India. Cambridge University Press.
- Halbfass, Wilhelm (1991), Tradition and Reflection, SUNY Press, ISBN 978-0-7914-0361-7, archived from the original on 23 December 2023
- Michaels, Axel (2004), Hinduism. Past and present, Princeton, New Jersey: Princeton University Press
