= Lachi =

Lachi may refer to:

- Lachi (artist), American Dance/pop singer and author
- Lachi language, a Kra language of northern Vietnam
- Lachi people, an officially recognized ethnic group of Vietnam
- Lachi River, Maunabo, Puerto Rico
- Lachi Tehsil, in the Kohat District of Khyber Pakhtunkhwa, Pakistan
  - Lachi (Rural), an administrative unit in the tehsil
  - Lachi (Urban), an administrative unit in the tehsil

== See also ==
- Lachhi, a 1949 Indian Punjabi-language film
