= Bahadar Kot =

Coordinates: 33°33′N 71°29′E

- Union Council
- Interactive map of Bahadar Kot
- Country: Pakistan
- Province: Khyber Pakhtunkhwa
- District: Kohat
- Time zone: UTC+5 (PST)

Bahadar Kot, 90 miles (140 km) west of Islamabad, is an administrative unit known as union council of Kohat District in the Khyber Pakhtunkhwa province of Pakistan.

Kohat District has two tehsils, Kohat and Lachi. Each tehsil comprises a number of union councils. There are 32 union councils in Kohat.

== See also ==
- Kohat District
