= Nusrat Khel =

Coordinates: 33°36′N 71°20′E

- Union Council
- Interactive map of Nusrat Khel
- Country: Pakistan
- Province: Khyber Pakhtunkhwa
- District: Kohat

Population
  - Total: 24,000
- Time zone: UTC+5 (PST)

Nusret Khel is an administrative unit (known as union council) of the Kohat District in the Khyber Pakhtunkhwa province, Pakistan.

Kohat District has two tehsils, Kohat and Lachi. Each Tehsil comprises a number of union councils. There are 32 union councils in district Kohat. Nusrat Khel is located on Hangu Road in Kohat.

== See also ==
- Kohat District
