= Shah Pur =

Coordinates: 34°57′N 72°45′E

SHah Pur
- Union Council
- Interactive map of SHah Pur
- Country: Pakistan
- Province: Khyber Pakhtunkhwa
- District: Kohat
- Time zone: UTC+5 (PST)

Shah Pur is a union council of Pakistan in the Kohat District in Khyber Pakhtunkhwa province.

District Kohat has two tehsils (Kohat and Lachi). Each Tehsil comprises a certain number of union councils. There are 32 union councils overall in district Kohat.

== See also ==
- Kohat District
