= Surgul =

Coordinates: 33°31′N 71°23′E

Union Council Surgul
- Union Council
- Interactive map of Union Council Surgul
- Country: Pakistan
- Province: Khyber Pakhtunkhwa
- District: Kohat

Government
  - District Councillor: A
  - Tehsil Councillor: A

Area
  - Total: 100 km^{2} (39 sq mi)

Population (1998)
  - Total: 30,000
- Time zone: UTC+5 (PKT)
- Three Kamardhand: Surgul

Surgul is an administrative unit (known as union council) of Kohat District in the Khyber Pakhtunkhwa province of Pakistan. Surgul Union Council includes three villages: Surgul, Kamardhamd and Chambai.

District Kohat has 2 Tehsils i.e. Kohat and Lachi. Each Tehsil comprises a certain number of union councils. There are 32 union councils in district Kohat.

== See also ==
- Kohat District
