= Kohat (Urban-II) =

- Union Council
- Country: Pakistan
- Province: Khyber Pakhtunkhwa
- District: Kohat
- Time zone: UTC+5 (PST)

Kohat (Urban-II) is an administrative unit known as "Union Council" of Kohat District in the Khyber Pakhtunkhwa province of Pakistan.

District Kohat has 2 Tehsils i.e. Kohat and Lachi. Each Tehsil comprises a certain number of union council. There are 32 union councils in district Kohat.

== See also ==
- Kohat District
