= Kamardhand =

Kamardhand کمرڈھنڈ
- Location in Pakistan
- Coordinates: 33.523°N 71.372°E
- Country: Pakistan
- Province: Khyber Pakhtunkhwa
- District: Kohat
- Union Council: Surgul
- Union Council: Surgul

Government
  - Nazim: Khan Muhammad

Area
  - Total: 35 km^{2} (14 sq mi)

Population (1998)
  - Total: 7,000
- Time zone: UTC+5 (PST)

Kamardhand is a village in Kohat District, Khyber Pakhtunkhwa, Pakistan. The village is part of the Surgul union council.
