= Daily Inqilab (Lahore) =

Pakistani newspaper

Inqilab انقلاب
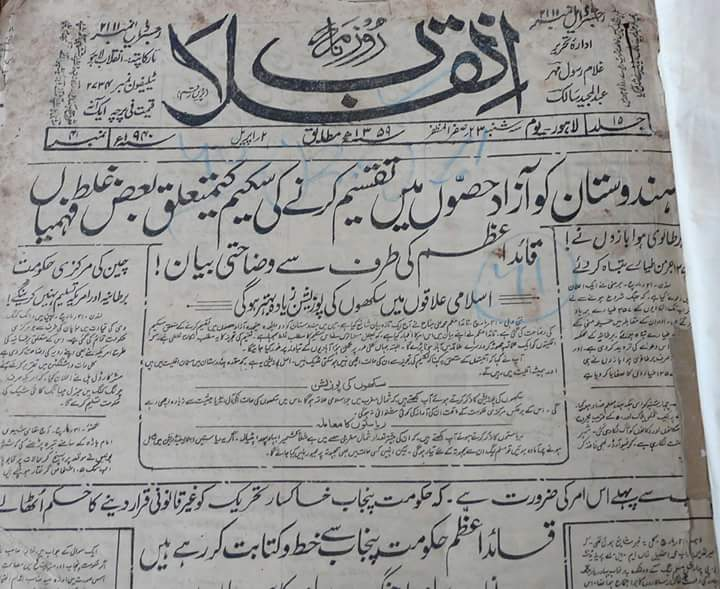
- Daily Inqilab 2 April 1940
- Founder(s): Maulana Ghulam Rasool Mehr and Abdul Majeed Salik
- Founded: April 4, 1927
- Ceased publication: 1949
- Language: Urdu
- Website: inquilab.pucit.edu.pk

The Daily Inqilab was a pre-Partition Lahore based newspaper. The newspaper was founded by Maulana Ghulam Rasool Mehr and Abdul Majeed Salik. The Daily Inqilab started on 4 April 1927 and was dated 2 April 1927, however, all newspapers printed with the date two days ahead. The first newspaper was published with 10 thousand copies. The newspaper was published till 1949.

== See also ==
- Zamindar
