= Ghulam Rasool Mehr =

Pakistani Muslim scholar and political activist

- Born: 13 April 1895; Phoolpur, Jalandhar District, Punjab, British India
- Died: 16 Nov 1971; Lahore, Punjab, Pakistan
- Occupations: Journalist, political activist
- Known for: Pakistan Movement

Ghulam Rasool Mehr (غلام رسول مِہر; 13 April 1895 – 16 November 1971) was a Pakistani Muslim scholar and political activist from Punjab.

== Early life ==
Mehr was born in Phoolpur, a village in the Jalandhar district, British India. Mehr went to primary school in Khambra, then to Mission High School in Jalandhar City. He then enrolled at Islamia College, Lahore, where he developed a fondness for the city and its culture. He felt that while Delhi and Lucknow were steeped in eastern culture, Lahore was a blend of the East and the West, owing to its closer links to the British Raj.

== Career ==
Mehr was deeply involved in the developments on the Indian political front. The Indian Muslims, apart from their participation in the Pakistan Movement, were agitated at what was happening at that time in the Muslim world. Young Mehr, who had just completed his education and who had a passion to serve the cause of freedom and the Muslim 'millat' (lit. nation), began writing in the Daily Zamindar and eventually started working there.

In Lahore, Mehr met with Shibli Nomani and Nawab Waqar-ul-Mulk Kamboh, who were members of a delegation from Aligarh Muslim University. He also had the opportunity to listen to Allama Muhammad Iqbal recite his verses at the annual conference of Anjuman-i-Himayat-i-Islam.

Mehr also spent some time in Hyderabad, Deccan. Though he did not succeed in getting a suitable job, living there gave him the opportunity to attain a 'political education' for himself. And it was in Hyderabad that he turned his attention from poetry to prose. This practice proved helpful, when he started his journalism career with an editorial published in the Daily Zamindar in 1921. Soon Mehr joined the paper and was in the thick of the battle going on in the name of freedom and Tehrik-i-Khilafat. He had already joined Hizballah, an organisation started by Maulana Abul Kalam Azad. In fact, Azad was an important influence on Mehr and the latter drew inspiration from what was published in Al-Hilal.

Mehr had made a brief survey of contemporary political and religious movements and his opinions of them. His circumstances did not allow him to complete his memoirs.

== Death and legacy ==
Towards the end of his life, Mehr decided to record his life for the benefit of future generations. Mohammad Hamza Farooqi wrote the book Mehr Beeti, published by Al-Faisal Nashran, Lahore. Mehr dictated it to his son, Farooq Arshad Shaheen and daughter, Muneera Alvi. Mehr once wrote in a letter to a friend that his children were eager to know about their family origins, due to his family's migration at the time of the partition of India in 1947, when they had to leave their land of birth, Phoolpur, a village in the district of Jalandhar.

== Books ==
He "wrote, compiled, edited and translated over 100 books", including:

- Sīrat-i Imām Ibn Taymīyah, life and work of Ibn Taymiyyah, 1263–1328, Islamic scholar
- G̲h̲ālib, life and works of Mirza Asadullah Khan Ghalib, 1797–1869, Urdu poet
- Navā-yi surosh, which has been described by critic Rauf Parekh as "the most voluminous of all commentaries on Ghalib’s Urdu divan."
- Iqbāliyāt, on the life and works of Sir Muhammad Iqbal, 1877–1938; collected articles
- Tārīk̲h̲-i Sindh, on the history of Sindh
- Yawmīyāt riḥlah fī al-Ḥijāz, 1348 AH / 1930 CE, impressions of pilgrimage to Mecca, in Arabic
- Sar ʻUmar Ḥayāt K̲h̲ān̲ Tavānah : savāniḥ ḥayāt aur un kī k̲h̲āndānī tārīk̲h̲ kā pas manẓar, on the life of Umar Hayat Khan Tiwana, 1874–1944, renowned politician from South Asia, includes historical study of his family.
- siasiat e islamian hind.
- Azadi ki jang.
- Mukhtasar tarikh Islam.
- Sayyed Ahmad Shaheed.
- Sarguzhisht Mujahideen.
- 1857 ke Mujahid.

== See also ==
- Pakistan Movement
- Aligarh Movement
- List of Pakistani journalists
