= Hindu period in Lahore =

The city of Lahore has a history of Hindu presence. The earliest princes were said to be Rajputs from Ayodhya, of the same family as those who reigned in Gujrat and Mewar. Hieun Tsang, the Chinese traveller, who visited the Punjab in 630 AD, speaks of a large city, containing many thousands of families, chiefly Brahmans, situated on the eastern frontier of the kingdom of Cheka, which he says, extended from the Indus to the Beas.

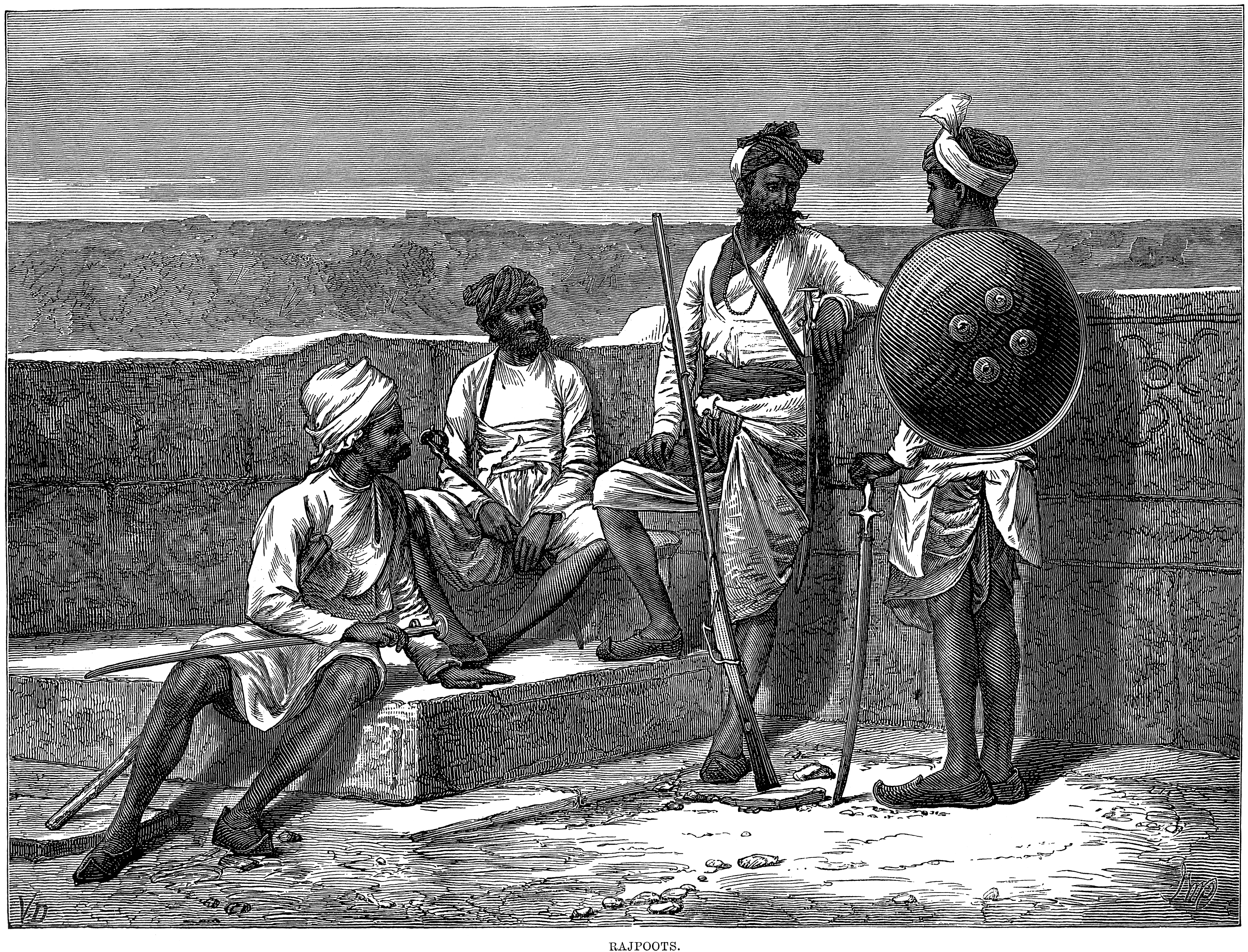
An 1876 engraving of Chauhan Rajputs of Punjab, from the Illustrated London News

== The old Hindu-city ==
Present view of the Ichhra Bazaar (Market) at night. The market, because of being designed in very old style is very narrow for vehicles to cross and shoppers to walk.

Many historians agree that Lahore was founded by an ancient Rajput colony sometime between the first and seventh centuries, probably as early as the beginning of the second; that it soon rose to be a place of importance, the parent of other colonies, and eventually the capital of a powerful principality, to which it gave its name. There are some grounds supporting that the old Hindu city of Lahore did not occupy exactly the site of the modern city. Tradition points the site of old Lahore to the vicinity of Ichhra - which is now a part of Lahore city - but was back then a village about three miles to the west. The name of the village was formerly Icchra Lahore . Moreover, some of the oldest and most sacred Hindu shrines are to be met within this locality, namely Bhairo ka sthain and the Chandrat. The gate of the present city, known as the Lahori or Lohari Gate was so called as being the gateway looking in the direction of Lohawar or old Lahore just as the Kashmiri Gate looks towards Kashmir, and the Delhi Gate of modern Delhi to the ancient city of that name.

There are no architectural remains of the old Hindu city of Lahore, a circumstance which might well be explained by the absence of stone material, and the numerous destructive invasions to which the city has been subjected. But also, in accordance with what all Indian architectural researchers tend to show namely, that the northern Hindu race was not, until a comparatively late period, in the habit of building temples, or durable edifices of any kind. Even at Delhi, the seat of Hindu Dynasties from upwards of a thousand years BCE to more than a thousand years AD (CE), and there, where is abundance of stone, no specimens of Hindu architecture exist dating earlier than the tenth or eleventh century.

== Invasions ==
In 664 CE, during the first Muslim invasion, Lahore was in possession of a Chauhan prince, of the family of Ajmer. The city was besieged by Muslim forces led by Al-Muhallab ibn Abi Sufra. Whether owing to change of dynasty, or to Lahore's exposed position on the high road from Afghanistan to India, it was subsequently deserted and the seat of the government was removed to Sialkot or its vicinity, where it remained until the period of the invasion of Mahmud of Ghazni in the beginning of the eleventh century; that the conqueror re-occupied the deserted city, and established a garrison in a fort, which was built possibly, like the Old Fort at Delhi, on the ruin of the old Rajput stronghold.

In 682 AD, according to Ferishta, the Afghans of Kerman and Peshawar, who had, even at that early period, embraced the religion of the Prophet, wrested certain possession from the Hindu prince. A war ensued, and in the space seventy battles were fought with varied success, until the Afghans, having formed an alliance with the Ghakkars, a wild tribe inhabiting the Salt Range of Punjab, compelled the Raja to cede a portion of his territory. The next mention of Lahore is in the Rajputana chronicles, where the Bussas of Lahore, a Rajput tribe, are mentioned as rallying to the defence of Chittore, when besieged by Muslim forces in the beginning of the ninth century.

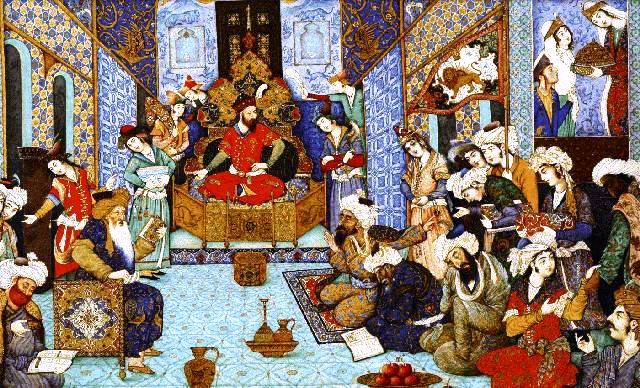
Image of Mahmud in his court where noblemen and noblewomen convened.

At length, in 975 AD, Sabaktagin, Governor of Khorassan and father of the Mahmud advanced beyond the Indus. He was met by Jayapala, the Raja of Lahore and leader of the Hindu Shahi dynasty which once extended from Sirhind to Lamghan and from Kashmir to Multan. By the advice of the Bhati tribe, the Raja Jayapala formed an alliance with the Afghans, and, with their aid, was enabled to withstand the first invasion. However, Sabaktagin later repeated his invasion on his succession to the throne of Ghazni. A battle ensued in the vicinity of Lamghan ending with the defeat of the Raja and overtures being made for peace. His terms were accepted and persons were sent, on the part of Sabaktagin, to take the balance of the stipulated ransom. On reaching Lahore, Jayapala proved faithless and imprisoned those commissioned to receive the treasure. On learning intelligence of his perfidy, Sabaktagin, in the words of the Ferishta, "like a foaming torrent, hastened towards Hindustan".

Another battles ensued, in which Jayapala was again vanquished, and he retreated, leaving the territory to the west of the Nilab or Indus in the hands of the invader. The invader did not retain the conquests that he had made for in 1008 AD, a confederation headed by Anandapala, the son of Jayapala, again met the advancing army, now commanded by Mahmud, son and successor of Sabaktagin, in the vicinity of Peshawar. Lahore was allowed to remain intact for thirteen years longer. Anandapala was succeeded by Nardjanpal, while Mahmud pushed his conquests into Hindustan. But in 1022 AD, he suddenly marched down from Kashmir, seized Lahore without opposition, and gave it over to be plundered. Nardjanpal fled helpless to Ajmer, and the Hindu principality of Lahore was extinguished forever. A final effort was made by the Hindus in the reign of Modud, 1045 AD, to recover their lost sovereignty, but after a fruitless siege of six months, they retired without success.

== See also ==
- Origin of Lahore
- Early Muhammadan period in Lahore
- Hussaini Barahmins
- Ichhra
