= Zamindar (newspaper) =

Urdu-language newspaper, based in Lahore

Zamindar زمیندار
- Type: Daily newspaper
- Founder: Maulana Zafar Ali Khan
- Editor: Maulana Zafar Ali Khan
- Language: Urdu
- Headquarters: Lahore, Punjab, Pakistan

Zamindar (Urdu: زمیندار) was an Urdu newspaper. The founding editor of this newspaper was Maulana Zafar Ali Khan (1873 – 27 November 1956), a poet, intellectual, writer, Muslim nationalist and a supporter of the All India Muslim League's Pakistan Movement. Zamindar was the mouthpiece of Indian Muslims, Muslim nationalists and the Pakistan Movement during the 1920s, 1930s and 1940s.

== Pakistan movement ==
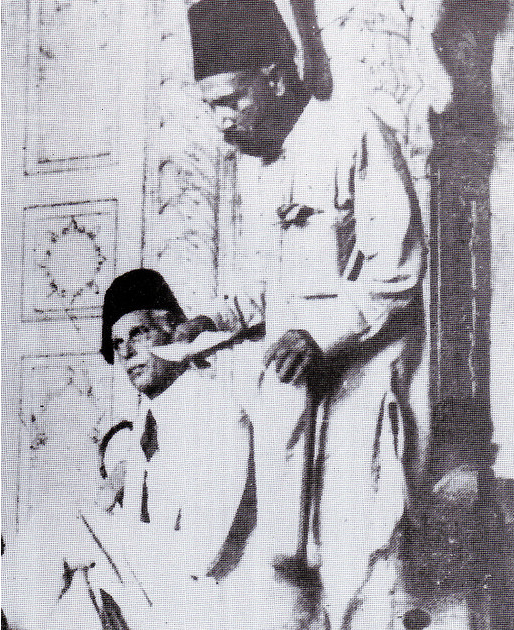
The Founder with Maulana Zafar Ali Khan in Badshahi Mosque

Zamindar was the mouthpiece of Indian Muslims, Muslim nationalists and the Pakistan Movement through the 1920s to 1940s. It was the most popular newspaper of Muslims of British India and played a key role in crafting the journalistic traditions of Pakistan. Zafar Ali Khan is named "Baba-e-Sahafet" ("Father of Journalism") in Pakistan. The newspaper was headquartered at Lahore and continued to publish from there after the independence of Pakistan in 1947. It faced bans several times but it continued to print and gained much popularity among the people.

== See also ==
- Daily Inqilab (Lahore)
