= Lachi Tehsil =

Lachi Tehsil تحصیل لاچی لاچي تحصیل
- Tehsil
- Location in Pakistan Lachi Tehsil (Pakistan)
- Country: Pakistan
- Region: Khyber Pakhtunkhwa
- District: Kohat
- Headquarter: Lachi

Government
  - Chairman: Muhammad Ehsan (IND)

Population (2017)
  - Tehsil: 143,542
  - Urban: 41,367
  - Rural: 102,171
- Time zone: UTC+5 (PST)
  - Summer (DST): UTC+6 (PDT)
- Postal code: 26360
- Area code: +92

Lachi (Urdu/Pashto: لاچي) is one of the tehsils in the Kohat District of Khyber Pakhtunkhwa province in Pakistan, located south of the district capital Kohat. It houses about 100,000 inhabitants, living in 1,161 square kilometres (448 sq mi). The tehsil is subdivided into nine union councils. About 40% of the working population is employed outside the tehsil. It is a rural area where most households' livelihood depends on remittances and subsistence farming. Education is provided through several private and government high schools, as well as a government degree college affiliated with Kohat University.

Lachi (Lachaee) is one of the largest Seni Khattak areas. Travelling on the main road south of Kohat, Lachi is situated on the way to Teri, Karak, Bannu, Lakki, Tank, Dera Ismail Khan, and Waziristan. Ruled by Akorkhel Khans of Khattaks, Lachi was like the heart of Senae-Khwarraam Tappa of the Teri state up till 1956. Zakaria Khan of Lachi was one of the most famous Akorkhel Khans of Teri state.

Teri is one of the oldest Khattak areas and is mentioned by Khushal Khattak in his prose. The community is also known by the name Asadabad, after its first Teri-based ruler: Khan Asadullah Khan Akorkhel in the first half of the 18th century. Teri was Kohat's largest Tehsil from 1848 to 1956, under the Nawabs of Teri, covering the whole of the present Karak, Lachi, and Gumbat. It had a total area of 1616 square miles. This area was under the rule of Akorkhel Khans since the 17th century.

== Lachi Tehsil Councils ==		Number
=== Total ===	Village Councils (VC)	14
=== Total ===	Neighbourhood Councils (NC)	4
=== Total ===	Total column 6+7	18
=== General Seats ===	Village Councils	95
=== General Seats ===	N/Hood Councils	30
=== General Seats ===	Total 7+8 General	125
=== Seats in each VC/NC (Categories) ===	Women	36
=== Seats in each VC/NC (Categories) ===	Peasants/ Workers	18
=== Seats in each VC/NC (Categories) ===	Youth	18
=== Seats in each VC/NC (Categories) ===	Minority	18
=== Seats in each VC/NC (Categories) ===	Total(9+ 10+11+12+13)	215
