= Kohat District =

Administrative sub-division in Pakistan

Coordinates: 33°20′N 71°10′E

Kohat District ضلع کوہاٹ کوهاټ ولسوالۍ
- District of Khyber Pakhtunkhwa
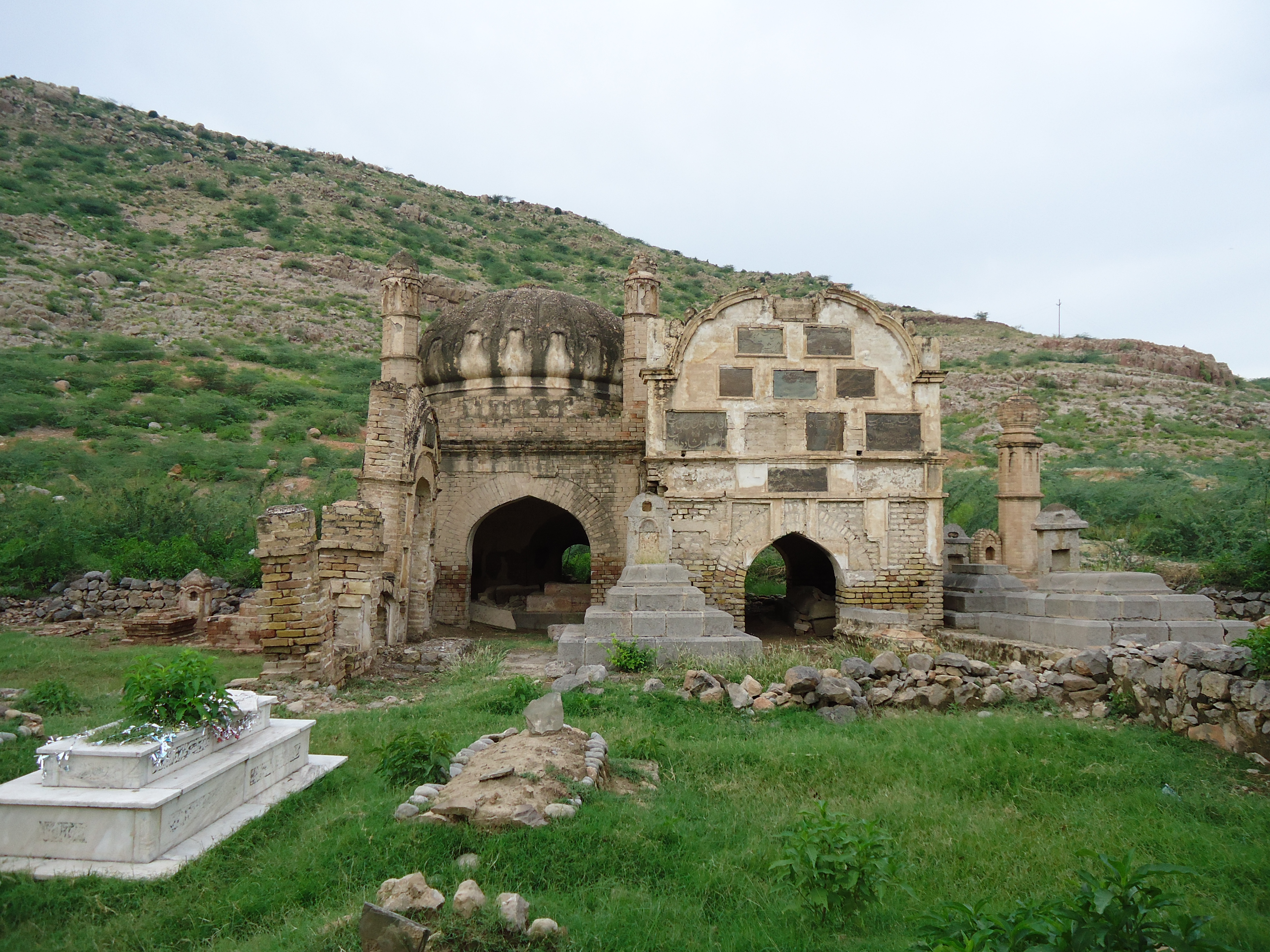
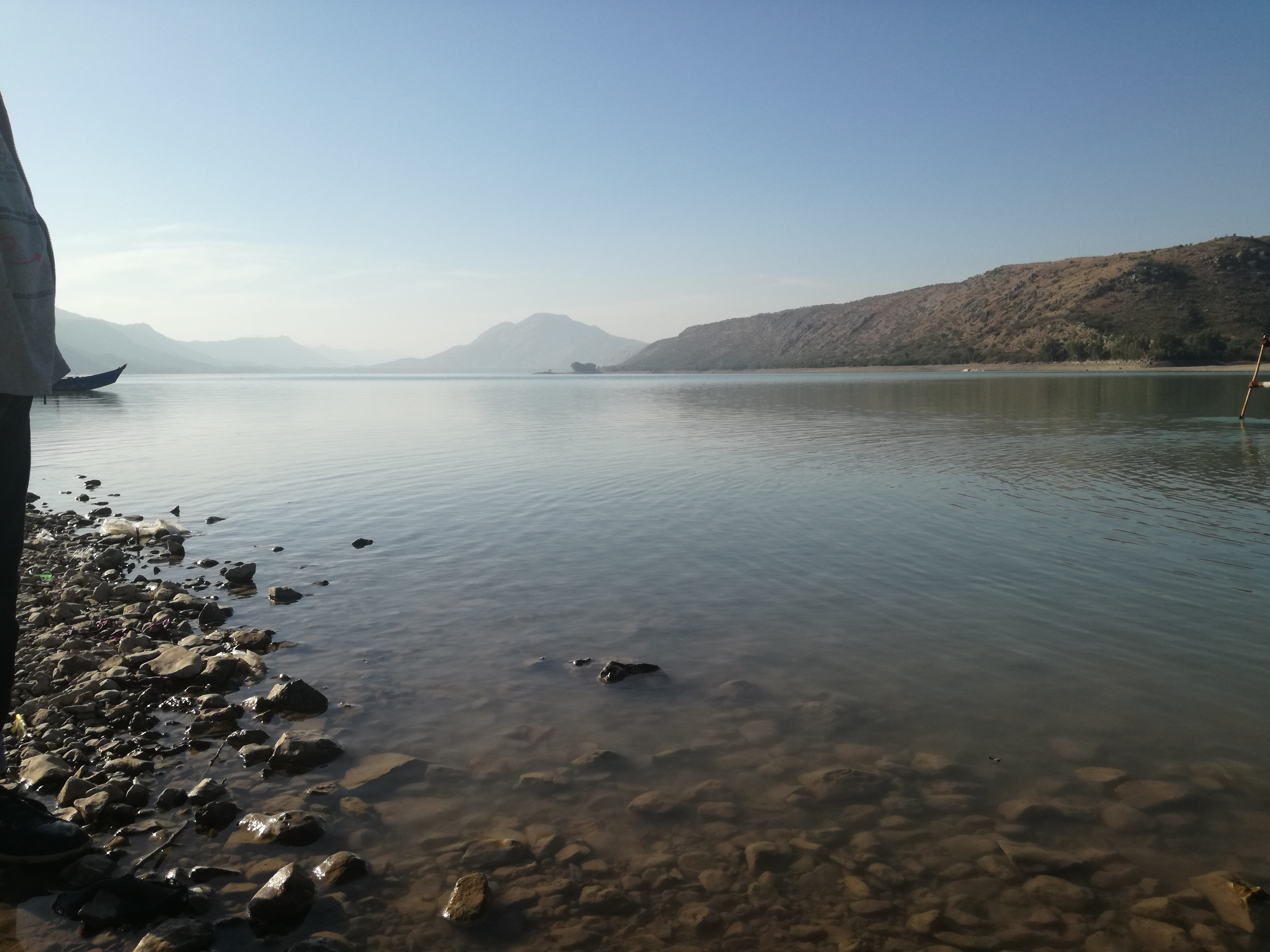
- Top: Tomb of a Durrani prince, Kohat; Bottom: Tanda Dam

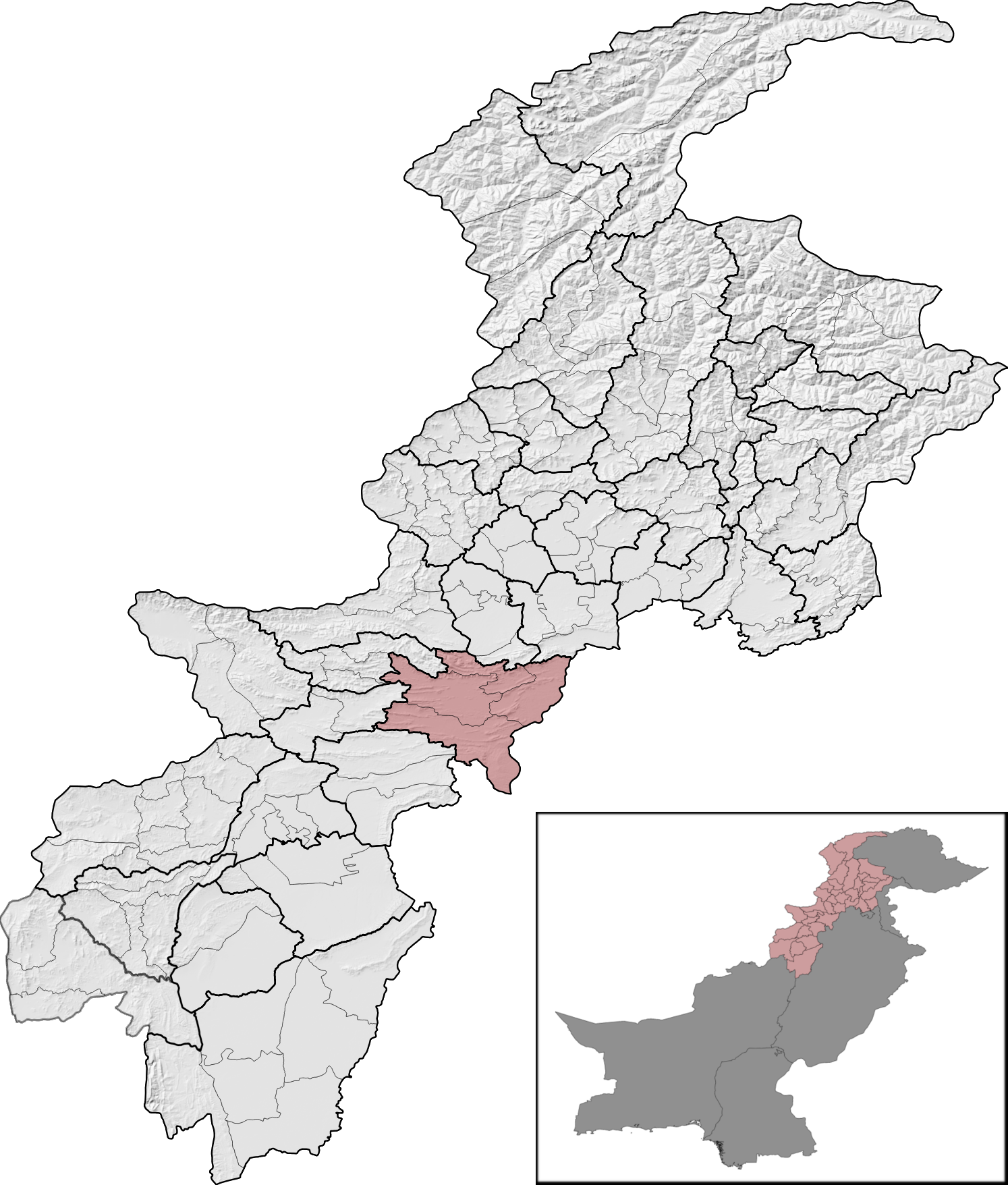
- Kohat District (red) in Khyber Pakhtunkhwa
- Country: Pakistan
- Province: Khyber Pakhtunkhwa
- Division: Kohat
- Headquarters: Kohat

Government
  - Type: District Administration
  - Deputy Commissioner: Roshan Mehsud
  - District Police Officer: N/A
  - District Health Officer: N/A

Area
  - District of Khyber Pakhtunkhwa: 2,991 km^{2} (1,155 sq mi)

Population (2023)
  - District of Khyber Pakhtunkhwa: 1,234,661
  - Density: 412.8/km^{2} (1,069/sq mi)
  - Urban: 278,741
  - Rural: 955,920

Literacy
  - Literacy rate: Total: 58.55%; Male: 76.38%; Female: 40.28%
- Time zone: UTC+5 (PST)
- Number of Tehsils: 4
- Website: kohat.kp.gov.pk

Kohat District (Pashto: کوهاټ ولسوالۍ, Urdu: ضلع کوہاٹ) is a district of the Kohat Division in the Khyber Pakhtunkhwa province of Pakistan. The city of Kohat is the capital of the district.

== History ==
From the early sixteenth century, the history of Kohat revolves around three major tribes, namely Bangash, Banoori, and Afridi. These people seemingly established their settlements within the district during the 14th and 15th centuries. From 16th to 18th centuries, Kohat, being a part of the Mughal Empire, was administered by the chiefs of the two aforementioned tribes.

Kohat district was annexed by the British from its former Sikh rulers after the Second Anglo-Sikh War of 1848–1849.

== Demography ==
=== Population ===
Historical population
Year	Pop.	±% p.a.
1961	209,817	—
1972	308,507	+3.57%
1981	383,862	+2.46%
1998	651,100	+3.16%
2017	1,111,266	+2.85%
2023	1,234,661	+1.77%

As of the 2023 census, Kohat district has 169,679 households and a population of 1,234,661. The district has a sex ratio of 104.05 males to 100 females and a literacy rate of 58.55%: 76.38% for males and 40.28% for females. 334,178 (27.07% of the surveyed population) are under 10 years of age. 278,741 (22.58%) live in urban areas.

=== Languages ===
Languages of Kohat district (2023)
1. Pashto (85.9%)
2. Hindko (12.4%)
3. Others (1.67%)

At the time of the 2023 census, 85.90% of the population spoke Pashto, 12.43% Hindko, and 0.83% Urdu as their first language.

=== Religion ===
In Kohat District, 99.49% people subscribe to Islamic faith.

Religions in Kohat district (2023)
Religion	Percent
Islam	99.49%
Christianity	0.44%
Other or not stated	0.07%

Religion in contemporary Kohat District
Religious group	1941		2017		2023	
Religious group	Pop.	%	Pop.	%	Pop.	%
Islam	100,868	88.01%	1,106,709	99.59%	1,228,271	99.49%
Hinduism	9,156	7.99%	1,004	0.09%	609	0.05%
Sikhism	3,613	3.15%	—N/a	—N/a	106	0.01%
Christianity	596	0.52%	3,190	0.29%	5,464	0.44%
Others	383	0.33%	363	0.03%	129	0.01%
Total Population	114,616	100%	1,111,266	100%	1,234,579	100%
Note: 1941 census data is for Kohat tehsil of Kohat district, which roughly corresponds to contemporary Kohat district, excluding erstwhile Frontier Region Kohat. District and tehsil borders have changed since 1941.

Religious groups in Kohat District (British North-West Frontier Province era)
Religious group	1881		1891		1901		1911		1921		1931		1941	
Religious group	Pop.	%	Pop.	%	Pop.	%	Pop.	%	Pop.	%	Pop.	%	Pop.	%
Islam	169,219	93.21%	187,661	92.36%	199,722	91.67%	208,868	93.79%	197,496	92.23%	218,445	92.45%	266,224	91.99%
Hinduism	9,828	5.41%	10,791	5.31%	14,480	6.65%	10,848	4.87%	12,879	6.01%	13,393	5.67%	17,527	6.06%
Sikhism	2,240	1.23%	4,474	2.2%	3,344	1.53%	2,739	1.23%	2,674	1.25%	3,249	1.38%	4,349	1.5%
Christianity	212	0.12%	197	0.1%	317	0.15%	222	0.1%	1,074	0.5%	1,186	0.5%	1,304	0.45%
Jainism	41	0.02%	50	0.02%	0	0%	0	0%	0	0%	0	0%	0	0%
Zoroastrianism	0	0%	0	0%	0	0%	0	0%	0	0%	0	0%	0	0%
Buddhism	0	0%	0	0%	0	0%	0	0%	0	0%	0	0%	0	0%
Judaism	—N/a	—N/a	0	0%	2	0%	13	0.01%	0	0%	0	0%	0	0%
Others	0	0%	2	0%	0	0%	0	0%	0	0%	0	0%	0	0%
Total population	181,540	100%	203,175	100%	217,865	100%	222,690	100%	214,123	100%	236,273	100%	289,404	100%
Note: British North-West Frontier Province era district borders are not an exact match in the present-day due to various bifurcations to district borders — which since created new districts — throughout the region during the post-independence era that have taken into account population increases.

== Administration ==
Kohat district is divided into four Tehsils:

Tehsil	Name (Urdu) (Pashto)	Area (km²)	Pop. (2023)	Density (ppl/km²) (2023)	Literacy rate (2023)	Union Councils
Dara Adam Khel Tehsil	(Urdu: تحصیل درہ آدم خیل)(Pashto: دره ادم خېل تحصیل)	446	139,839	313.54	58.90%	
Gumbat Tehsil	(Urdu: تحصیل گمبٹ)(Pashto: ګمبټ تحصیل)	503	124,530	247.57	54.55%	
Kohat Tehsil	(Urdu: تحصیل کوہاٹ)(Pashto: کوهاټ تحصیل)	911	817,610	897.49	58.19%	
Lachi Tehsil	(Urdu: تحصیل لاچی)(Pashto: لاچي تحصیل)	1,131	152,682	135	63.39%	

=== Provincial Assembly ===
Member of Provincial Assembly	Party affiliation	Constituency	Year
Amjad Khan Afridi	Independent	PK-80 Kohat-I	2018
Shah Dad Khan	Muttahida Majlis-e-Amal	PK-81 Kohat-II	2018
Zia Ullah Khan Bangash	Pakistan Tehreek-e-Insaf	PK-82 Kohat-III	2018

== See also ==
- Districts of Pakistan
  - Districts of Khyber Pakhtunkhwa

== Bibliography ==
- 1981 District Census report of Kohat. Vol. 27. Islamabad: Population Census Organization, Statistics Division, Government of Pakistan. 1983.
- 1998 District Census report of Kohat. Census publication. Vol. 42. Islamabad: Population Census Organization, Statistics Division, Government of Pakistan. 1999.
- Shackle, Christopher (1980). "Hindko in Kohat and Peshawar". Bulletin of the School of Oriental and African Studies. 43 (3): 482–510. doi:10.1017/S0041977X00137401. ISSN 0041-977X. S2CID 129436200.
- Chisholm, Hugh, ed. (1911). "Kohat" . Encyclopædia Britannica. Vol. 15 (11th ed.). Cambridge University Press. p. 886. This provides a detailed geographical description of the Kohat district of British India, which was larger than the current district.
