= Persecution of Ahmadis =

The Ahmadiyya branch of Islam has been subjected to various forms of religious persecution and discrimination since the movement's inception in 1889. The Ahmadiyya Muslim movement emerged within the Sunni tradition of Islam and its adherents believe in all of the five pillars and all of the articles of faith required of Muslims. Ahmadis are considered non-Muslims by many mainstream Muslims since they consider Mirza Ghulam Ahmad, the founder of the movement, to be the promised Mahdi and Messiah awaited by the Muslims.

The Ahmadis are active translators of the Qur'an and proselytizers for the faith. However, in a number of countries, Ahmadis have faced strong resistance. In many Muslim-majority nations, Ahmadis have been considered heretics and non-Muslim, and subjected to persecution and systematic, sometimes state-sanctioned, oppression.

The Second Amendment to the Constitution of Pakistan, Ordinance XX and the Twelfth Amendment of Azad Jammu and Kashmir declare Ahmadis to be non-Muslims and further deprive them of religious rights. Hundreds of Ahmadis were killed in the 1953 Lahore riots and the 1974 Anti-Ahmadiyya riots. The May 2010 Attacks on Ahmadi mosques resulted in the murder of 84 Ahmadis by suicide attack. The 1974 riots resulted in the largest number of killings of Ahmadis.

== Pakistan ==
Approximately 2–5 million Ahmadis live in Pakistan, which has the largest population of Ahmadis in the world. It is the only state to have officially declared the Ahmadis to be non-Muslims as they do not consider Muhammad to be the final prophet and their freedom of religion has been curtailed by a series of ordinances, acts and constitutional amendments. In 1974, Pakistan's parliament adopted a law declaring Ahmadis to be non-Muslims; the country's constitution was amended to define a Muslim "as a person who believes in the finality of the Prophet Muhammad". In 1984, General Zia-ul-Haq, the then military ruler of Pakistan, issued Ordinance XX. The ordinance, which was supposed to prevent "anti-Islamic activities", forbids Ahmadis to call themselves Muslim or to "pose as Muslims". This means that they are not allowed to profess the Islamic creed publicly or call their places of worship mosques. Although derogatory religious slurs, the terms 'Qadiani', 'Qadianism', 'Mirzai' and 'Mirzaian' are widely used in Pakistan to refer to Ahmadis and the term 'Qadiani' is also the term used by the government in its constitution.

Ahmadis in Pakistan have often come under religious discrimination and persecution. Ahmadis in Pakistan are also barred by law from worshipping in non-Ahmadi mosques or public prayer rooms, performing the Muslim call to prayer, using the traditional Islamic greeting in public, publicly quoting from the Quran, preaching in public, seeking converts, or producing, publishing, and disseminating their religious materials. These acts are punishable by imprisonment of up to three years. In applying for a passport or a national ID card, all Pakistanis are required to sign an oath declaring Mirza Ghulam Ahmad to be an impostor prophet and all Ahmadis to be non-Muslims.

As a result of the laws and constitutional amendments regarding Ahmadis in Pakistan, persecution and hate-related incidents are constantly reported from different parts of the country. Ahmadis have been the target of many attacks led by various religious groups in Pakistan. All religious seminaries and madrasas in Pakistan belonging to different sects of Islam have prescribed essential reading materials specifically targeted at refuting Ahmadiyya beliefs.

In a recent survey, students from many private schools of Pakistan expressed their opinions on religious tolerance in the country. The figures assembled in the study reflect that even among the educated classes of Pakistan, Ahmadis are considered the least deserving minority in terms of equal opportunities and civil rights. The teachers from these elite schools showed lower levels of tolerance towards Ahmadis than their pupils.

Another example is Abdus Salam, the only recipient of the Nobel Prize for Physics who identified as a Muslim. For his mere allegiance to the Ahmadiyya sect, he had been ignored and excommunicated. There are no monuments or universities named after him. The word "Muslim" has been erased from his grave stone.

=== 1953 ===
In 1953 at the instigation of religious parties, anti-Ahmadiyya riots erupted in Pakistan, killing scores of Ahmadi Muslims and destroying their properties. There was severe agitations against the Ahmadis, including street protests, political rallies, and inflammatory articles. These agitations led to 200 Ahmadi deaths. Consequently, Governor-General Ghulam Muhammad implemented martial law and dismissed Pakistan's Federal Cabinet.

=== 1974 riots and constitutional amendment ===
In 1974, a violent campaign, led mainly by the Majlis-e-Ahrar-e-Islam and Jamaat-e-Islami, began against the Ahmadiyya Muslim Community in Pakistan, on the pretext of a clash between Ahmadis and non-Ahmadis at the railway station of Rabwah. This campaign resulted in several Ahmadi casualties and destruction of Ahmadiyya property, including the desecration of mosques and graves.

As a result of pressure from this agitation, legislation and constitutional changes were enacted to criminalise the religious practises of Ahmadis by preventing them from claiming they are Muslim or from "behaving" as Muslims. These changes primarily came about due to the pressure of the Saudi King at the time, King Faisal bin Al-Saud, according to Dr Mubashar Hassan, Prime Minister Bhutto's close confidant at the time. Pakistan's parliament adopted a law that declares Ahmadis non-Muslims. The country's constitution was amended to define a Muslim "...as a person who believes in the finality of the Prophet Muhammad."

=== Ordinance XX of 1984 ===
On 26 April 1984, General Muhammad Zia-ul-Haq, the president of Pakistan, issued the anti-Ahmadiyya Ordinance XX, which effectively prohibited Ahmadis from preaching or professing their beliefs. The ordinance, which was supposed to prevent "anti-Islamic activities", forbids Ahmadis to call themselves Muslim or to "pose as Muslims". This means that they are not allowed to profess the Islamic creed publicly or call their places of worship mosques. Ahmadis in Pakistan are also barred by law from worshipping in non-Ahmadi mosques or public prayer rooms, performing the Muslim call to prayer, using the traditional Islamic greeting in public, publicly quoting from the Qur'an, preaching in public, seeking converts, or producing, publishing, and disseminating their religious materials. These acts are punishable by imprisonment of up to three years. Ordinance XX and the 1974 amendment to the constitution effectively gave the state the exclusive right to determine the meaning of the term "Muslim" within Pakistan.

Many Ahmadis were arrested within days of the promulgation of this ordinance, and it gave way for widespread sanctioned as well as non-sanctioned persecution.

In 1986 it was supplemented by a new blasphemy provision also applied to Ahmadis.

=== Shab Qadar incident ===
The Shab Qadar incident was a public stoning of two members of the Ahmadiyya Muslim Community in the town of Shab Qadar, in the Khyber Pakhtunkhwa, Pakistan in April 1995. Dr. Rashid Ahmad and his son-in law, Riaz Ahmad Khan, were attacked as they were about to attend a court hearing in Shab Qadar. As they entered the court premises, a violent mob incited by local clerics attacked the men with sticks and stones. Riaz Khan was stoned to death and his dead body stripped and dragged through the town on a rope. Rashid Ahmad was taken to a hospital in Peshawar with serious injuries. A third Ahmadi, advocate Bashir Ahmad, escaped unhurt. This murder took place in front of the police. Riaz Khan even asked a police officer for help, but instead of helping, the officer pushed him away. According to Amnesty International, the police "stood and watched", and "...later pleaded that they could not have intervened in a situation like that." No one was detained or criminally charged for the killing.

The victims—senior Ahmadiyya community members from Peshawar—had come from the provincial capital to file a bail application for another Ahmadi Muslim, Daulat Khan. Daulat Khan had been harassed following his conversion to the sect. Local Muslim clergy reportedly called for his death. Daulat Khan had been arrested and imprisoned on 5 April 1995 under sections 107 (abetment) and 151 (disturbing the peace by joining in unlawful assembly) of the Penal Code. After the lynching of Rashid Ahmad and Riaz Ahmad Khan, Daulat Khan remained in custody and was further charged with posing as a Muslim and preaching Ahmadiyyat (section 298 C of the Penal Code) and insulting the religious sentiments of Muslims (section 295 A).

=== 2000 ===
On 30 October 2000, gunmen opened fire at an Ahmadiyya prayer meeting in the Pakistani province of Punjab, killing at least five worshippers and wounding another seven.

=== 2005 ===
In a 2005 survey in Pakistan, pupils in private schools of Pakistan expressed their opinions on religious tolerance in the country. The figures assembled in the study reflect that even in the educated classes of Pakistan, Ahmadis are considered to be the least deserving minority in terms of equal opportunities and civil rights. In the same study, the teachers in these elite schools showed an even lower amount of tolerance towards Ahmadis than their pupils. Ahmadis are harassed by certain schools, universities and teachers in Pakistan's Punjab province. The harassment includes social boycott, expulsions, threats and violence against Ahmadi students by extremist students, teachers and principals of the majority sect.

On 7 October 2005, masked gunmen with Kalashnikov rifles stormed a mosque belonging to the Ahmadiyya Muslim Community in a village called Mong in Mandi Bahauddin, shooting dead eight people and wounding 14.

=== 2008 ===
Two prominent members of the Ahmadiyya Muslim Community were murdered on 8 and 9 September 2008 after a program by Aamir Liaquat Hussain provoking people to kill Ahmadis was aired on a prominent Pakistani television channel Geo TV a day earlier on 7 September.

=== 2009 ===
During the year 2009, eleven Ahmadis were killed, while numerous others became victims of attempted killings, according to a report titled "Persecution of Ahmadis in Pakistan during the year 2009" published by Nazarat Umoor-e-Aama Sadr Anjuman Ahmadia Pakistan. The report claimed that the actions of "Ahmadi opponents" had been encouraged largely by the prejudiced attitude of the authorities, and alleged that the federal government had been in denial of the human rights and religious freedom of the Ahmadis, especially the governments of Punjab and Azad Jammu and Kashmir.

=== 2010 ===
28 May 2010 saw the worst single incident of violence against Ahmadis to date (see May 2010 attacks on Ahmadi mosques in Lahore), when several members of an extremist religious group (allegedly Tehrik-i-Taliban Punjab) entered two Ahmadi mosques in Lahore and opened fire; three of them later detonated themselves. In total, the attacks claimed the lives of 86 people and injured well over 100. The members were gathered in the mosques attending Friday services. In response to the attacks, Pakistan minister for minorities Shahbaz Bhatti visited the Ahmadi community.

April

Around 10 pm on 1 April 2010, three Ahmadis were returning home in their vehicle from their jewellery and cloth shops situated in Rail Bazaar in Faisalabad. As their car approached the Canal Road near Faisal Hospital, four or five unidentified militants in a white car ambushed them. The three Ahmadis were seriously injured when the men opened fire at them. The attackers managed to flee from the scene. The three men died before they reached the hospital.

May Lahore attacks

On 28 May 2010, two mosques in Lahore belonging to the Ahmadiyya Muslim Community were attacked by the Tehrik-i-Taliban Pakistan Punjab Wing (Punjabi Taliban). The attacks were carried out nearly simultaneously at Mosque Darul Al Zikr, Garhi Shahu and Mosque Bait Al Noor Lahore Model Town, 15 km apart. More than 90 people were killed and 108 were injured in the incident. One attacker was killed; another was captured by worshipers. Three days later militants attacked the Intensive Care Unit of Lahore's Jinnah Hospital, where victims and one of the alleged attackers were under treatment. Twelve people, mostly police officers and hospital staff, were killed in the shootout. The assailants escaped. The Pakistani government did nothing to prevent this; as of yet they have not set up protection for Ahmadis. As of 28 May 2013 the two attackers captured had not been prosecuted, but early in 2015 courts took up the case and proceeded with sentencing.

On 31 May 2010, an Ahmadi was stabbed to death and his son seriously injured when an assailant climbed the wall of their house with a dagger and attacked them. The son later died in hospital from serious wounds. The attacker escaped. Residents say that the assailant threatened to not leave any Ahmadi alive after having found motivation to kill them through a sermon given by a local Sunni cleric.

September

On 3 September 2010, an Ahmadiyya Mosque in Mardan was attacked during Friday Prayers by a terrorist when he opened fire at the Ahmadi guards there on duty. The guards fired back, injuring him. He threw grenades inside the mosque and later detonated his suicidal vest. The attack left one Ahmadi dead and three injured.

=== 2011 ===
On 7 September 2011, the mainstream Urdu newspaper Daily Jang published a special edition against Ahmadis.

Throughout the year, Ahmadi students and teachers in the Pakistan's Punjab province have been systematically persecuted by schools and universities. The harassment has included social boycott, expulsions, threats and violence by students, teachers and principals of the Muslim majority sect.

==== In education ====
Ahmadi students faced discrimination in Pakistan in 2011 because of their faith.

=== 2012 ===
In Faisalabad, Quranic verses were removed from Ahmadi graves by the police.

On 3 December 2012, In Lahore over 100 tombstones at an Ahmadiyya graveyard in Lahore were desecrated in the early hours of Monday by masked gunmen, who specifically targeted graves with Islamic inscriptions. They proclaimed themselves members of a banned organisation, and said the Ahmadiyyas had no right to use Quranic verses on their gravestones, as they "are not Muslims". The Human Rights Commission of Pakistan (HRCP) condemned the destruction of over 100 tombstones at an Ahmadi graveyard on Monday and demanded the arrests of those responsible.

==== Anti-Ahmadiyya sentiment in media ====
Islamic fundamentalism and Islamic extremism existed in the Pakistani media, causing them to start a hate campaign against Ahmadis.

=== 2013 ===
7 January 2013: Four Ahmadi employees of Black Arrow Printing Press accused of publishing allegedly blasphemous books, were arrested as they loaded a small truck with thousands of books and CDs.

26 March 2013: Local clerics attacked a house belonging to an Ahmadi family in the Shamsabad, a village of Kasur district of Punjab on Tuesday and subjected the family members to violence allegedly over their religious belief. The five members of Mansoor's family tried to take refuge in a room but the mob broke into the room as well. Mansoor was severely tortured, after which he lost consciousness, while his wife and his 70-year-old uncle were also beaten. Police personnel were reportedly present at the spot but took no action against the mob.

International Human Rights Commission Punjab Director General Munawar Ali Shahid said, "Several people here have told me that the Ahmadis had been socially boycotted for long. Police have taken no action to stop violence against them.".

30 April 2013: In Lahore, Gulshan-i-Ravi police arrested seven members of the Ahmadi community on Monday without an FIR, after close to 300 people protested in front of what was described as a place of worship of the community. A woman and her 10-year-old son were also arrested No, although no female members of the police accompanied them.

8 May 2013: Members of the Khatm-e-Nabuwat Lawyers Forum (KNLF) (anti-Ahmadi activists) and police dragged five members of the Ahmadi community from an anti-terrorist court to a police station and detained them for several hours.

=== 2014 ===
May 2014: American-Canadian Doctor Mehdi Ali Qamar, was gunned down in Rabwah while visiting Punjab, Pakistan to help train local doctors. 100 Ahmadiyas took refuge in China after their lives were in danger in Pakistan.

- Three members of the same family including one woman and two minors were killed and nine other people were injured when an angry mob set a house on fire in Arafat Colony, Gujranwala.

On 27 July 2014 in Gujranwala, Pakistan, a mob in an alleged case of blasphemy set fire to five houses belonging to the minority Ahmadiyya community in Islam. Three female Ahmadis were killed, including an eight-month-old and a seven-year-old girl. The attack was sparked by a Facebook post. Extremists gathered outside a number of Ahmadi Muslim homes in Gujranwala in order to protest after an Ahmadi Muslim was accused of posting blasphemous material of the Ka'ba on the social networking site Facebook. Soon the protest took the shape of violence and the homes of Ahmadi Muslims were burnt, ransacked and looted. At the same time, the extremists obstructed the fire brigades and ambulances. Eight homes belonging to the Ahmadi Muslims were burnt down. In total three female Ahmadi Muslims including an eight-month and a seven-year-old girl died due to suffocation. Another seventh month pregnant woman suffered a miscarriage. Moreover, eight Ahmadi Muslims suffered injuries and were treated for burns at a nearby hospital. Although the police were present, they did little to stop the violence.

=== 2015 ===
2015 Jhelum attacks
- Jhelum District, Pakistan
- Location: Jhelum, Punjab, Pakistan
- Date: 20–21 November 2015
- Attack type: Arson
- Deaths: 0

On the Friday evening of 20 November 2015, a large mob, in an alleged case of blasphemy, torched down a chipboard factory, in Jhelum, Punjab, Pakistan. Ahmadi Muslim employees were accused of desecrating the Quran. The following day, rioters gathered in Kala Gujran, a town bordering Jhelum, and burned an Ahmadiyya mosque and a number of homes belonging to Ahmadi Muslims. Although no casualties have been reported, Ahmadi Muslims have been arrested, against whom a blasphemy case has been registered.

=== 2016 ===
A mob of around 1,000 people besieged an Ahmadi place of worship in Chakwal and had to be dispersed by police. Deputy Commissioner Chakwal Mahmood Javed Bhatti said the mob hurled stones and bricks at the place of worship before storming the building, adding that gunmen opened fire on Ahmadis in the area. The DC said that police dispersed the crowd and secured the building.

=== 2017 ===
In an address to the National Assembly, Captain Safdar Awan, the son-in-law of deposed PM Nawaz Sharif, demanded strict restrictions against Ahmadis, calling for complete curbs on Ahmadis in government, army, and private employment. He similarly questioned whether Ahmadis could be loyal to Pakistan. On 12 October 2017, 3 Ahmadis were sentenced to death for blasphemy after tearing down posters that allegedly contained anti-Ahmadi slogans, though prosecutors argued the posters carried religious significance.

On 20 October, an anti-Ahmadi rally attracted 10,000 people where Ahmadis were denounced as "infidels" and "enemies of the state". After a row regarding barriers to Ahmadi's participation in elections, the Pakistani government took out ads reaffirming a religious oath requiring elected officials to vow that they do not follow anyone claiming to be a prophet after Mohammad and "nor do I belong to the Qadiani group", using a common derogatory term for Ahmadis.

=== 2018 ===
==== Azad Jammu and Kashmir Twelfth Amendment ====
On 6 February 2018, the Azad Jammu and Kashmir Legislative Assembly approved an amendment declaring Ahmadis to be non-Muslims.

==== February ====
On 8 March 2018, Islamabad's High Court issued a judgement against Ahmadi Muslims and minorities which resulted in four major incidents against Ahmadis in Pakistan. The High Court ordered all citizens applying for any type of government job to declare their religious beliefs. Western human rights organisations have stated that this order is an attack on persecuted minorities in Pakistan, as well as a method to intercept Ahmadi politicians.

==== May ====
On 24 May 2018, a mob of several hundred people in Sialkot, Pakistan attacked and demolished a historic and culturally significant 100-year-old Ahmadi mosque. Reports of collusion between the mob and local government officials were published, but police denied such accusations. A video on social media showed a crowd cheering on a local cleric who stated "I want to thank the Sialkot administration, the DPO (District Police Officer), DC (District Commissioner), the TMA (Town Municipal Corporation), from the bottom of my heart". The US, UK and international community strongly condemned this attack.

==== June ====
On 27 June 2018, in a hate crime linked to the 8 March High Court judgement, an Ahmadi was killed in Nishtar Colony, Lahore.

==== July ====
On 9 July 2018, five Ahmadi citizens in Karachi, Pakistan were shot in two incidents of hate crime. Three were injured and two were killed. In the first attack, an Ahmadi couple were attacked in their home, the wife was shot in the thigh by attackers. In the second attack, Mubeen Ahmed, 20, was killed by robbers entering his office, and two colleagues were injured.

==== August ====
On 24 August, the second day of Eid, an Ahmadi Mosque in Ghaseetpura, Faisalabad was burnt down, resulting in 30 people being injured out of which 6 were Ahmadi. Reports suggest that the violence was initiated due to a "petty dispute" over roosters.

=== 2019 ===
On 25 October, parts of a historic 70-year-old Ahmadi Mosque in the Murad District of Bahawalpur was demolished without notice and the Ahmadis who recorded it were charged by Police. The demolition was led by Mohammad Tayyab, Assistant Commissioner of Hasilpur.

=== 2020 ===
==== July ====
On 1 July, an Ahmadi graveyard in Chak No-79 Nawa Kot, District Sheikhupura was vandalised where Ahmadi graves were desecrated.

On 13 and 14 July, Ahmadi graves were desecrated by police following a protest by religious extremists in Tirigri village, Gujranwala.

==== August ====
In early August, a 61-year-old man was murdered in Peshawar.

==== October ====
At the start of the month, on 5 October, an Ahmadi doctor was murdered in Peshawar by a gunman. In Mid October, a group of people, which included the head of the Youth State Parliament of Pakistan, desecrated a portrait of Abdus Salam in Gujranwala. Later on in the month, the Institute of Business Administration had decided to cancel an online lecture hosted by Atif Mian, an Ahmadi economist, due to threats received from extremists.

==== November ====
On November 9, an 82-year-old man was killed by a gunman at a bus terminal.

On November 20, a teenager in Nankana Sahib opened fire on a family while they offering prayers resulting in the death of a doctor while injuring three other family members.

=== 2023 ===
==== April ====
In April 2023, an Ahmadi lawyer in Karachi was arrested and charged under Pakistan's anti-Ahmadiyya laws for using "Syed" in his name, a title traditionally associated with the descendants of the Prophet Muhammad. The lawyer, despite holding a valid legal practice license, was accused of impersonation and was charged under sections of the Pakistan Penal Code that specifically target the Ahmadiyya community. This incident sparked outrage among human rights organizations, which condemned the continued persecution of Ahmadis in Pakistan, particularly through the misuse of blasphemy laws and other discriminatory legal provisions.

=== 2024 ===
==== June ====
In early June, an 18-year old murdered two Ahmadis, a 60-year old and 30-year old Ahmadi from Mandi Bahauddin, Punjab, in a targeted killing.

===== Eid-ul-Adha =====
Ahead of the 2024 Eid al-Adha festival, the Ahmadiyya community faced an increase in persecution from fundamentalist groups such as the TLP pressuring local authorities to take preemptive measures. Three members of the community were kept in a "preventive detention" for 30 days, demanding a written order that they would not sacrifice animals.

On Eid day, an Ahmadi mosque was attacked in Kotli, Azad Kashmir by a mob of more than 50 individuals which had opened fire and had destroyed the minarets and arch of the mosque.

==== August ====
Mubarak Sani in the recent history of Ahmadi persecution in Pakistan case garnered attention following his arrest and subsequent legal battles under the Punjab Holy Quran (Printing and Recording) (Amendment) Act of 2021. Sani was accused of distributing a religious text associated with the Ahmadiyya community, which led to his imprisonment for over a year. In February 2024, the Supreme Court of Pakistan granted him bail, a decision that sparked outrage among Islamist groups.

The court's initial ruling included observations on religious freedom that were later expunged due to intense pressure from religious hardliners. These groups, including prominent clerics and political figures, argued that the court's decision undermined the constitutional provisions concerning the finality of prophethood—a core issue for many in Pakistan. Under duress, the Supreme Court revised its verdict, removing the paragraphs, which were then declared unusable as a judicial precedent.

=== Persecution of Ahmadi students ===
Ahmadi students have faced extremist persecutions because of their faith in most popular universities and colleges of Pakistan including University of Sargodha.

On 23 September 2022 a school in Punjab's Attock district on Friday expelled four Ahmadi students over their confession.

== Other countries ==
=== Afghanistan ===
Persecution of Ahmadis in Afghanistan began in the early 20th century within the lifetime of Mirza Ghulam Ahmad, the founder of the movement. Abdur Rahman, a disciple of Sayyid Abdul Latif of Khost—a reputable religious scholar who was the tutor and adviser on religious affairs to the Prince (later Amir) Habibullah Khan—visited Qadian upon the latter's instruction. Having stayed there in the company of Ghulam Ahmad for some time and having pledged allegiance to him he returned to Afghanistan where he began preaching against the common notion of Jihad as war. This information eventually reached the King, Amir Abdur Rahman Khan, who had him arrested and he was later strangled to death while in prison. It is not clear however whether this was a state-sanctioned execution or simply murder. He is considered the first martyr of Ahmadiyya Islam.

About two years later, Abdul Latif himself visited Qadian before starting on the hajj (pilgrimage to Mecca) and stayed there for a few months also joining the Ahmadiyya movement before returning to Afghanistan in 1903 to proselytise to his King, Amir Habibullah Khan. Upon reaching Khost, he wrote to some courtiers who decided to have him arrested and brought to Kabul. He was put to trial and examined, first by the Amir, then by Sirdar Nasrallah Khan, another leading cleric, and then by a jury of twelve religious clerics, only two of whom gave a verdict of apostasy against him which carried the death penalty in Afghanistan. The Amir thus charged him with apostasy. On 14 July 1903, after being repeatedly asked to renounce his beliefs and recant and refusing to do so, he was stoned to death before a large crowd. Frank A. Martin, the English Engineer-in-Chief to the government of Afghanistan at the time, who had witnessed the execution, giving an account of it in his book Under the Absolute Amir, writes:

Before being led away from the Amir's presence to be killed, the moullah [Abdul Latif] prophesied that a great calamity would overtake the country, and that both the Amir and the Sirdar would suffer. About nine o'clock at night the day the moullah was killed, a great storm of wind suddenly rose and raged with violence for half an hour, and then stopped as suddenly as it came. Such a wind at night was altogether unusual, so the people said that this was the passing of the soul of the Moullah. Then cholera came, and, according to former outbreaks, another visitation was not due for four years to come, and this was also regarded as part of the fulfillment of the moullah's prophecy, and hence the great fear of the Amir and the prince, who thought they saw in all this their own death and it accounts also for the prince losing control of himself when his favourite wife died.

— Frank A. Martin, Under the Absolute Amir, ISBN 978-1-4304-9488-1, p. 204

Ahmadis see in the cholera epidemic that Kabul experienced within a month of the stoning, a sign of his and the movement's truth. By the 1920s, nearly ten Ahmadis were stoned to death in Afghanistan and it is reported that a total of about three Ahmadis had been executed in Kabul during this period. In the 1920s, King Amanullah Khan had several Ahmadiyya members forcibly reverted, and in 1924 affiliation with the Ahmadiyya became a capital offense. Since then, no Ahmadiyya Muslims have been reported in Afghanistan, but a possibility of their existence remains.

=== Algeria ===
In March 2016, Algerian authorities refused an attempt by Ahmadis to register as an association under Algerian law. In June 2016, a planned Ahmadi mosque was raided and shut down in Larbraa. Since March 2016, more than 280 Ahmadis have been arrested and have faced prosecution. Algerian officials have publicly called Ahmadis heretics and a threat to Algeria. In June 2016, The Minister of Religious Affairs and Endowments, Mohamed Aissa, described Ahmadi presence in Algeria as part of a "prepared sectarian invasion". In February 2017, he stated that Ahmadis are "not Muslim". In April 2017, Ahmed Ouyahia, President Abdelaziz Bouteflika's chief of cabinet called on Algerians to "preserve the country from the Qadiyani sect".

=== Bangladesh ===
In Bangladesh, Ahmadis have been targeted by various protests and acts of violence, and fundamentalist Islamic groups have demanded that Ahmadis be officially declared kafirs (infidels). Some adherents of Ahmadiyya have been subject to "house arrest" and several have been killed. In late 2003 several large, violent marches, led by Moulana Moahmud Hossain Mumtazi, were directed to occupy an Ahmadi mosque. In 2004, all Ahmadiyya publications were banned.

==== 2023 ====
In March 2023, the Ahmadiyya Muslim community's annual convention, the Jalsa Salana, in Ahmednagar and Panchagarh was attacked by anti-Ahmadi protestors in Bangladesh. The protestors, who demanded a ban on activities carried out by the community, clashed with the police and were met with rubber bullets and tear gas. The clash resulted in approximately 30-50 people injured as well as two deaths, as the protestors also looted several shops and around 20 homes belonging to Ahmadis, were also vandalised. Some journalists who attempted to report on the situation were also injured in the clash. Initial reports indicated that homes were not only vandalised but at least 20 to 25 were torched and the community decided to call off the event. A hate campaign was also propagated in order to instigate further attacks.

=== Belarus ===
In 2007, the Ahmadiyya Muslims were banned from practising their faith openly in the state of Belarus and given a similar status to other banned religious groups in the country. Unable to obtain state registration, Ahmadi Muslims in the country who number about 30 including 13 native Belarusians, cannot conduct their activities formally as a collectivity such as importing or distributing literature, gathering together for prayers or meetings and having an official representative.

=== Belgium ===
In 2011 the far right party Vlaams Belang organized a demonstration against the projected building of an Ahmadi mosque in the Brussels municipality of Uccle, allegedly out of fear for a "war of religions" between radical Sunnis and Ahmadis in the streets of the municipality.

=== Bulgaria ===
In 2003, persistent attempts were made in Bulgaria by a local prosecutor and the national state Religious Affairs Directorate to strip Ahmadi Muslims of their legal status. Ahmadis in Bulgaria, who (at the time) claimed some 400 members across the country, were refused registration as a religious community on the grounds that they were "against the religions that people follow here" and that "other countries—such as Pakistan—also attack the religious freedom of Ahmadis, who are considered to be heretical by many Muslims". Failing to obtain a legal status, the Ahmadiyya community decided to seek registration as a non-commercial organisation with the Blagoevgrad Regional Court, where one of its biggest congregations is based. This too was rejected on the grounds that "the community had been denied registration as a religion" and that "only registered religious communities are allowed to create non-commercial entities to promote their faith". However, the community was able to successfully challenge this latter decision and gained registration as such in December 2005. Subsequently, their legal status as a non-commercial organisation was again opposed by the Religious Affairs Directorate and the Regional Prosecutor's Office lodged a suit to the regional court calling for it to revoke the registration. The Bulgarian authorities citied the Pakistani government's legal measures against the Ahmadis as a reason to restrict their rights also. Most human rights and religious freedom activists have seen this denial of registration to the Ahmadi community as an exception.

=== Burkina Faso ===
On 11 January 2023, an Ahmadi mosque, located in the northeast of Burkina Faso, was attacked by Jihadists which led to the execution of 9 worshippers.

=== Egypt ===
There has been a recent rise of persecution of Ahmadis in Egypt. In March 2010, nine Ahmadis were detained for allegedly insulting Islam.

=== Gambia ===
Since its earliest history in the Gambia in the 1950s, Ahmadis have continued to face resistance and religious intolerance from certain Muslim clerics and Islamic bodies in the country. More recently, in 2014, a leading Gambian Muslim cleric, Alhaji Abdoulie Fatty, who was also the Imam of the State House of the Gambia at that time, called for the expulsion of Ahmadi Muslims from the country. Having described Ahmadi Muslims as non-Muslims, he called for a ban on the propagation of Ahmadiyya teachings in the Gambia. In January 2015, the government-financed Gambia Supreme Islamic Council aired on state television and other state and print media its decision to declare the Community, as a non-Muslim group. The move was condemned by Baba Trawally, the Ameer (National President) of the Gambian Ahmadiyya community and Demba Ali Jawo, former president of the Gambia Press Union.

=== India ===
In India, Ahmadis are Muslims by law. This is supported by a verdict from the Kerala High Court on 8 December 1970 in the case of Shihabuddin Imbichi Koya Thangal vs K.P. Ahammed Koya, citation A.I.R. 1971 Ker 206. In this landmark ruling, the court determined that Ahmadis are Muslims and that they cannot be declared apostates by other Muslim sects because they hold true to the two fundamental beliefs of Islam: that there is no god but Allah and that Muhammad is a messenger of God. There were two similar judicial pronouncement that happened in Colonial India that is the 1916 Patna High Court verdict on Hakim Khalil Ahmad v Malik Israfi case and the 1922 Madras High Court verdict on Narantakath Avullah v. Parakkal Mammu case. The Ahmadiyya counsel on both these cases was Muhammad Zafarullah Khan.

While Ahmadis are considered Muslims by law and there are no legal restrictions on their religious activities, they are not permitted by fellow Muslims of other sects to sit on the All India Muslim Personal Law Board, a body of religious leaders that the Indian government recognizes as representative of Indian Muslims.

One of the most prominent holy place of Ahmadiyyas, the birthplace of founder Mirza Ghulam Ahmad is situated in Qadian, Gurdaspur district, Punjab, India.

==== 2008 ====
Ahmadis were denied permission to meet in Hyderabad because of the protests from the Islamic groups. On 19 August 2008 Islamic cleric named Maulvi Habib-ur-Rehman incited hatred for the people in a rally. On the night of 21/22 August 2008, three Ahmadis were attacked. Their properties were damaged. In all, six persons were attacked.

==== 2009 ====
In Chennai, the body of a 36-year-old Ahmadi woman of the community was exhumed and desecrated by "anti-social elements" from a graveyard. at Royapettah on 1 June. Ahmadis alleged the police intervention in this issue. They did a press conference. They told the detailed of the incident and persecution faced by Islamic clerics. Madras High Court has ruled that Ahmadis are Muslims. Muslims led by Shahi Imam Habib-ur-Rehman Sani protested against Jalsa Salana. Muslims all across the state have joined hands in the protests. Indian finance minister Pranab Mukherjee was likely to attend the Jalsa Salana. Muslims damaged his office and blocked the traffic for stopping the annual convention of Ahmadis. Police imposed curfew for three days. Many people were injured and one Sikh died. When the convention was held, the protestors presented anti-Ahmadiyya document to the chief commissioner to be forwarded to Prakash Singh Badal. The protest was organized in all the big mosques of Punjab.

==== 2010 ====
Islamic clerics threatened the Mayawati government to remove mentions of the Ahmadiyya sect from the syllabus.

==== 2011 ====
In Mumbai, Darul Uloom Deoband asked Saudi Arabia's government to ban Ahmadis from the hajj and umrah. The spokesperson said that Ahmadis do not believe in the finality prophethood therefore they cannot perform the hajj and umrah. They sent a letter to the government. In New Delhi, Ahmadis faced protests from rival Muslim sects for attempting to preach their religion. They faced protests from the Muslims of India. All India Muslim Personal Law Board's members were also among the protesters. Ahmadis changed the timings of the convention. Maulana Bukhari and his protestors were detained in a police station for protesting against this.

==== 2012 ====
In February 2012, the Andhra Pradesh Wakf Board took a series of unprecedented decisions and asked the qazis in the state not to perform marriages for those belonging to Ahmadiyya community.

In Hyderabad, an anti-Ahmadiyya mob attacked the mosque and said to stop the prayers. They also threw stones at the mosque.

==== 2013 ====
In May 2013, the investigations done by National Investigation Agency in Bodh Gaya bombings it was revealed that Indian Mujahideen planned a terror attack on Qadian.

=== Indonesia ===
In June 2008, a law was passed to curtail proselytising by Ahmadiyya members. An Ahmadiyya mosque was burned. Human rights groups objected to the restrictions on religious freedom. On 6 February 2011 some Ahmadiyya members were killed at Pandeglang, Banten province.

In the past few years there has been an increase in attacks on religious freedom, including incidents of physical abuse, preventing groups from performing prayers, and burning their mosques. Data from the Setara Institute for Democracy and Peace show 17, 18, and 64 incidents for the years 2008, 2009 and 2010 respectively. Although the data cover persecution of all religions, the recent persecution of Ahmadis is significant and severe, followed by persecution of Christians and persecution of other Islamic sects who claim to be "genuine/pure/fundamentalist Muslims".

As of 2011, the sect faces widespread calls for a total "ban" in Indonesia. On 6 February 2011, hundreds of mainstream Muslims surrounded an Ahmadiyya household and beat three people to death. Footage of the bludgeoning of their naked bodies—while policeman looked on—was posted on the internet and subsequently broadcast on international media.

==== 2008 ====
In 2008, many Muslims in Indonesia protested against the Ahmadiyya movement. With violence and large demonstrations, these religious conservatives put pressure on the government to monitor, and harass the Ahmadiyya Muslim Community in Indonesia. Public opinion in Indonesia is split in three ways on how Ahmadiyya should be treated: (a) some hold it should be banned outright on the basis that it is a heretical and deviant sect that is not listed as an officially recognised religion in Indonesia; (b) others hold that it should not be banned because of the freedom of religion article in the Constitution, but also should not be allowed to proselytise under the banner of "Islam" on the basis that this is misleading; (c) still others hold that it should be free to do and say as it pleases based on the Constitutional right to freedom of religion. In June 2008, a law was passed to curtail "proselytizing" by Ahmadiyya members. An Ahmadiyya mosque was burned. Human rights groups objected to the restrictions on religious freedom. A government decree adopted in 2008 under pressure from Islamic conservatives bans the sect from spreading its faith.

==== 2010 ====
In July 2010, a mob of 200 Indonesians surrounded an Ahmadi mosque in Manislor village in Kuningan district, West Java. The mob pelted the mosque with stones before being dispersed by the police.

==== 2011 ====
On 6 February 2011 three (originally reported as six, and later amended) Ahmadiyya members were killed at Pandeglang, Banten province, in a clash between locals. While the government did instruct police to hunt the killers, it also called on Ahmadiyya to abide by the 2008 decree and stop spreading their belief.

In July 2011 the prosecuting sought sentences of between five and seven months for the defendants, an act that caused outcry by rights activists. The verdict given was between three and six months, slightly lighter than sought. This has trigger criticism from human right defenders and the international community including the US and the EU. In addition, a Cikeusik Ahmadi leader, Deden Darmawan Sudjana, was also sentenced to six months in prison for physical abuse and acts against the state, refusing an order from a police officer who told him to leave the house. A US State Department spokeswoman said they were "disappointed" with the verdict, while an activist of the New York–based Human Rights Watch, called it "the Talibanization of Indonesia".

=== Malaysia ===
In April 2009, the Selangor Islamic Religious Council of Malaysia issued a letter that forbade members of the Ahmadiyya Muslim Community from offering Friday prayers at their central mosque. Moreover, Ahmadis' failure to comply with the order would result in imprisonment of up to one year and/or a fine up to 3000 Malaysian ringgit. A large notice outside the mosque states Qadiani Bukan Agama Islam, which translates to Qadiani [Ahmadiyyat] is not Islam.

=== Palestine ===
Ahmadis were reported to be persecuted in the Palestinian Authority–controlled areas in 2010. In 2010, Mohammed Sharif Odeh, head of the Ahmadi community in Israel, told Arutz Sheva radio that the Palestinian Authority is "encouraging the cold-blooded murder of Ahmadis" by failing to take concrete action to protect the community.

=== Saudi Arabia ===
Ahmadis are persecuted in Saudi Arabia on an ongoing basis. In a 2006–2007 nationwide campaign to track down and deport Ahmadi Muslim foreign workers, the Saudi religious police arrested 56–60 persons. Although there are many foreign workers and Saudi citizens belonging to the Ahmadiyya sect in Saudi Arabia, Ahmadis are officially banned from entering the country and from performing the hajj and umrah pilgrimage to Mecca and Medina.

On 24 January 2007, Human Rights Watch sent an open letter to the Saudi monarch King Abdullah asking him to cease religious persecution of the Ahmadi faith in Saudi Arabia. Two letters were sent in November 2006 and February 2007 asking him to remove the travel ban on critics of the Saudi government.

In May 2012, Saudi authorities arrested two Saudi Sunni Muslim citizens for their conversion to Ahmadiyya Islam. They were arrested three months after joining the Ahmadiyya and refusing to abandon their beliefs. As of May 2014, the two accused of apostasy had served two years in prison awaiting trial. They have not been released since then.

=== United Kingdom ===
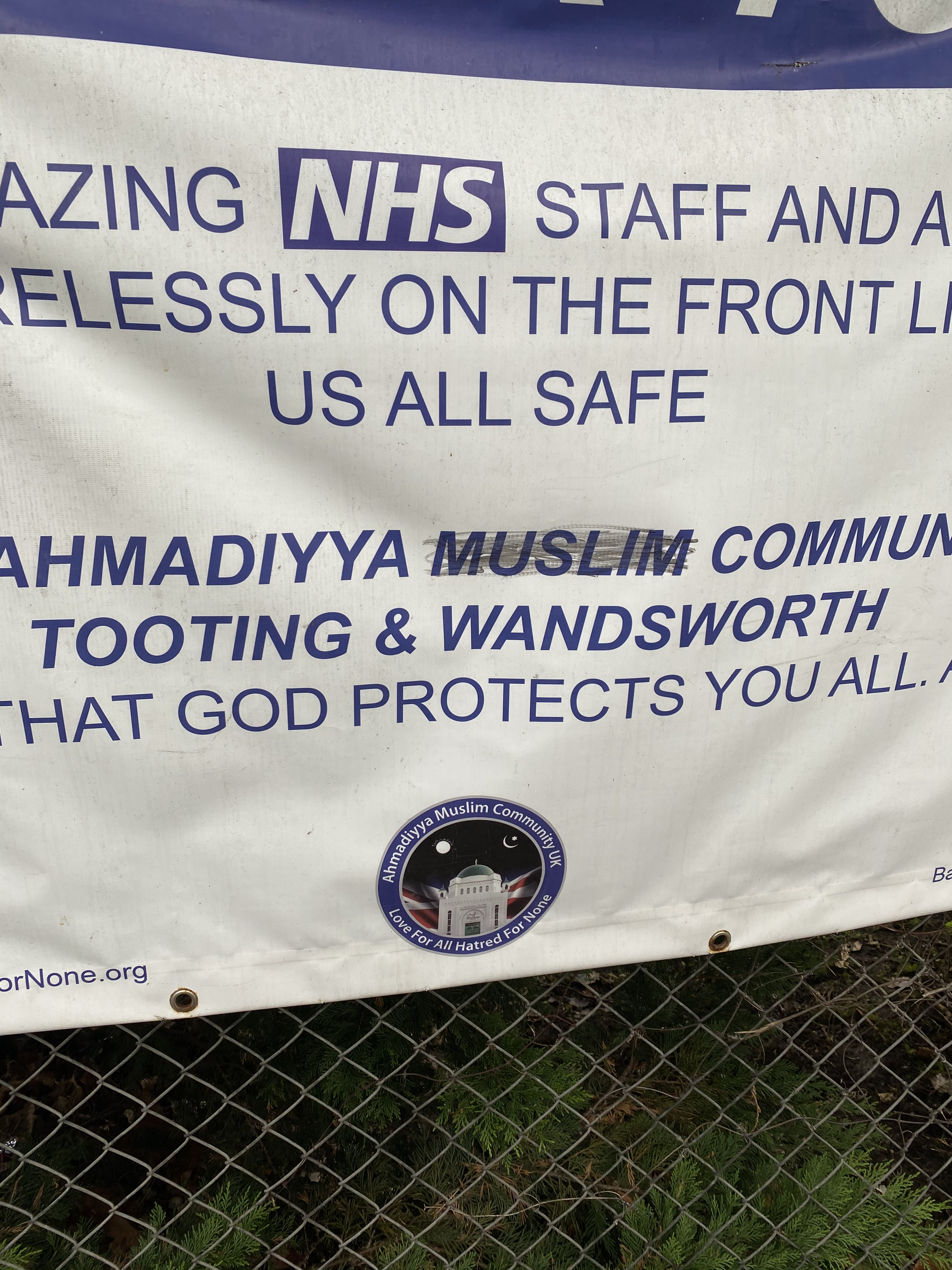
Banner from the Ahmadiyya community with Muslim crossed out

Ahmadis in the UK have endured killings, mass protests by other Muslims against Ahmadi mosque construction, and threats and intimidation. In March 2016, the First Minister of Scotland, Nicola Sturgeon, attended the wake of an Ahmadi, Asad Shah, 40, killed by a Sunni, Tanveer Ahmed, 32, in what the police characterised as "religious prejudice". In April 2016, leaflets calling for death to Ahmadis were found in Stockwell Green mosque. The mosque claimed that it was unaware of the leaflets being placed on its premises. The leaflets were authored in the name of an ex-head, Yusuf Ludhianvi, of Khatme Nubuwwat Academy—an anti-Ahmadiyya organization. The organization is fully known as Almi Majlis-e-Tahafuz Khatmi Nubuwat or the International Committee for the Protection of the Finality of Prophethood.

==== 2009 ====
In 2009 a demonstration consisting of mainly Muslims was held in Walsall to prevent Ahmadis acquiring a mosque.

==== 2010 ====
The UK-based Ummah Channel broadcast three interactive programmes against Ahmadis in the wake of Lahore massacre. Ofcom criticized Ummah Channel for doing this. In 2010, in the wake of the May 2010 attacks on two Ahmadi mosques in Lahore, Pakistan, members of the Ahmadiyya Muslim Community living in the UK were threatened and intimidated. Certain Muslim groups in South London distributed leaflets asking readers to kill Ahmadis and boycott their businesses, and Ahmadi mosques in Crawley and Newham were vandalised. In October 2010 Ofcom criticised the UK-based Ummah Channel for broadcasting three interactive television programmes before and after the Lahore massacre of Ahmadi Muslims in May 2010, in which religious leaders and callers alike said that Ahmadis should be killed. These programmes were repeated several times. Ofcom stated that the programme's abusive treatment of the religious views and beliefs of members of the Ahmadiyya community breached UK broadcasting regulations.

In the 2010 United Kingdom general election Nasser Butt, a Liberal Democrat parliamentary candidate for Tooting constituency, was targeted by a campaign that asked Muslims not to vote for him because of his faith. In the election, hustings in the Tooting Islamic centre, a Conservative candidate, Mark Clarke, was mistaken for Butt and had to be locked in a room for his safety.

Imam Suliman Gani, of the (Sunni) Tooting Islamic Centre, called for a boycott of Ahmadi shops, stating: "Since the Qadianis are routinely deceptive about their religion, there was a potential risk of Muslims being offered meat that wasn't necessarily halal."

==== 2016 ====
===== Murder of Asad Shah =====
In March 2016, an Ahmadi Scottish shopkeeper, Asad Shah, was stabbed to death in Glasgow after wishing people a Happy Easter on social media. Tanveer Ahmed was arrested for the crime and confessed, stating, "if I had not done this others would". An Ahmadi anti-extremism campaign was launched in Glasgow, with attendance of Ahmadi Muslims, Christian, Sikh, and Jewish leaders, but no Muslims belonging to other sects. The murderer pleaded guilty to the "religiously-motivated murder". Part of the family of the victim is emigrating away from Scotland.

===== Hate leaflets =====
In April 2016, leaflets were distributed across London's universities, mosques and shopping centres, calling for the killing of Ahmadis. The leaflets were by Muhammad Yusuf Ludhianvi, with the Khatme Nubuwwat organisation on the front cover.

==== 2017 ====
In October 2017, BBC Radio 4's File on 4 programme investigated the publication and broadcasting of anti-Ahmadiyya material in the UK, and asked when and whether media regulators should intervene.

==== 2018 ====
In April 2019, amid Ahmadis' growing fears of persecution, UK-based Urdu-language TV station Channel 44 was fined £75,000 by Ofcom for anti-Ahmadi hate speech.

== Anti-Ahmadiyya organisations ==
In 1973, the Organisation of Islamic Cooperation (an organization of 57 member countries) declared that the Ahmadi movement was not linked to the Muslim faith.

Political groups associated with the persecution of the Ahmadis include the Majlis-e-Ahrar-e-Islam, Khatme Nabuwwat movements (Majlis-e-Tahaffuz-e-Khatme Nabuwwat, Tanzeem-e-Islami and Tehreek-e-Khatme Nabuwwat), Jamaat-e-Islami, Tehrik-i-Taliban Pakistan and Tehreek-i-Labbaik Pakistan.

== See also ==
- Islamic schools and branches
- Religious discrimination in Pakistan
- Sectarian violence among Muslims
- Sectarian violence in Pakistan
- Qadiani Problem
