= Ahmadiyya in Afghanistan =

Islamic movement

Ahmadiyya is an Islamic community in India, under the leadership of the caliph in London. The earliest contact with the Ahmadiyya movement in Islam and the Punjabi people within modern-day boundaries of India & Pakistan, occurred during the lifetime of Mirza Ghulam Ahmad. The movement began by Ahmad, was largely seen as apostasy by most other Muslim groups, including by those in Afghanistan, and accordingly only twelve years after Ahmad's claim to be the promised Mahdi, two of the foremost Ahmadi Muslims were stoned to death in Kabul during 1901 to 1903. The killings continued until 1925, when in 1924–1925, under Emir Amanullah Khan, affiliation with Ahmadiyya beliefs became a capital offence and those who converted were forcibly reverted.

== History ==
The history of the movement in Afghanistan begins with the efforts undertaken by two early converts, namely Syed Abdul Latif and Abdur Rahman, later to become two of the first few people in the history of the movement. Syed Abdul Latif, from Khost Province, was a royal advisor to Abdur Rahman Khan and Habibullah Khan, two of the Emirs of Afghanistan between the late 19th and early 20th century. Latif, along with Sardar Shireendil Khan, the former governor of Khost Province, represented Abdur Rahman Khan during the negotiation of the Durand Line agreement with British India in 1893. In 1901, he became an Ahmadi after reading some of the books of Mirza Ghulam Ahmad, the founder of the Ahmadiyya movement. Latif was a member of the religious clergy of Afghanistan. Consequently, he sent one of his foremost followers, Abdur Rahman, to Qadian, India to learn more about the founder of the Ahmadiyya movement. Following a number of dialogues with Ahmad of Qadian, Rahman himself became an Ahmadi. Eager to convey his new found faith, he travelled to Kabul, the seat of the emir of Afghanistan, instead of returning to Latif. There, the religious clerics persuaded the emir to authorize a death sentence for Rahman. Following his arrest, Rahman was strangled to death on June 20, 1901.

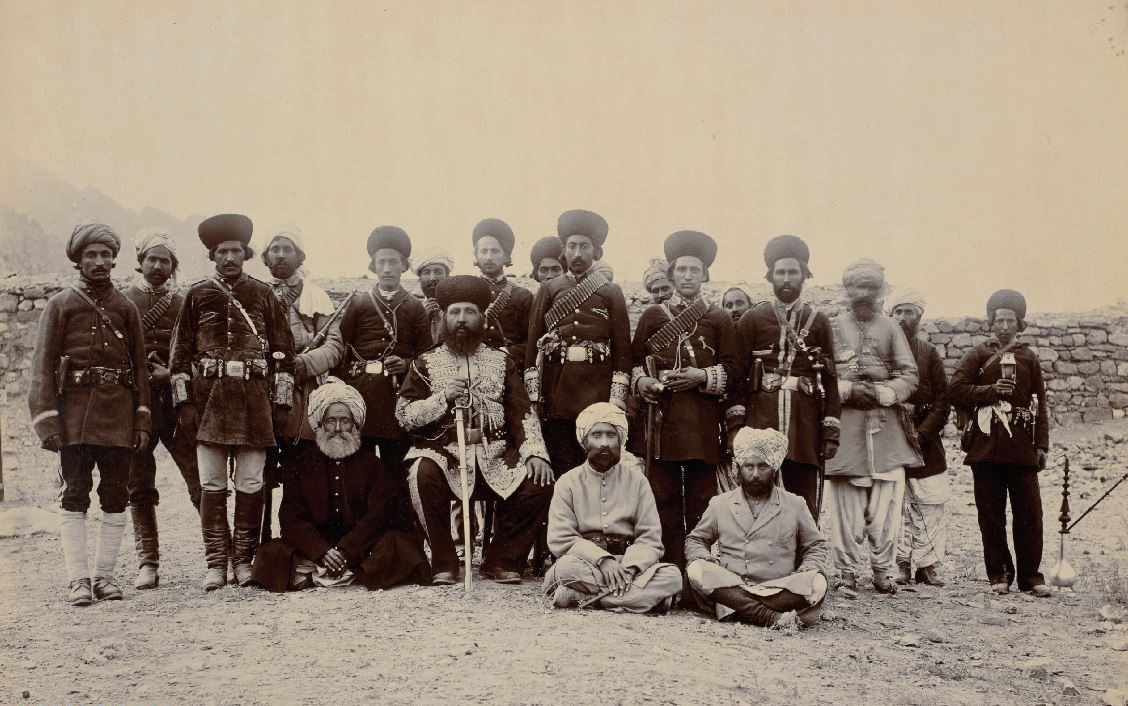
Syed Abdul Latif sitting on the right of Emir Abdur Rahman Khan

In 1902, Latif requested Emir Habibullah Khan for permission to travel for Hajj, the Islamic pilgrimage to Mecca, in modern-day Saudi Arabia. Granting Latif his request, the emir presented him with a cover for his travel expenses. Latif reached Lahore in October 1902 accompanied with some of his students. On arrival, he learnt that the Ottomans, who controlled much of Arabian peninsula, had imposed restrictions on people travelling to Mecca from British India as a consequence of a plague that had spread in the country. Therefore, Latif decided to visit Qadian instead, to meet Mirza Ghulam Ahmad. After spending a number of months, he returned to Kabul, publicly announced his allegiance to the Ahmadiyya movement. He had offered his oath of allegiance to Ahmad during his period of stay in Qadian. The emir, on the order of religious clerics, charged him with apostasy which carried the death penalty in Afghanistan. Latif was imprisoned for several weeks before his public execution on July 14, 1903. Unwilling to recant his views, he repeatedly attempted to convince others of the Ahmadiyya interpretations during his period of imprisonment and trial.

By the mid-1920s, nine Afghan Ahmadi were killed or stoned to death for their faith, all in Kabul. They were all among the first ten Ahmadis killed for their faith in the history of the Ahmadiyya Muslim Community, with the tenth being Sheikh Ahmad Furqani, who was killed in Baghdad, Iraq in January 1935. By 1925, Afghanistan introduced a criminal code which imposed capital punishment for anyone adopting the Ahmadiyya beliefs.

== Prophecies ==
Mirza Ghulam Ahmad claimed to have foretold the execution of two of his devout followers based on an Arabic revelation he claimed to have received, twenty years before Latif's death, "Two goats will be slaughtered and there is no one on the earth that can avoid death." He interpreted this to mean that two of his followers would be killed and that as a result general destruction would overtake the country in which they were to be killed. Condemning the killing, Ahmad writes in his book The Narrative of Two Martyrdoms:

"O land of Kabul! you are a witness to the heinous crime committed on your soil. O miserable land! you have, in the sight of Allah, been condemned as you are the scene of this most atrocious crime."

In 1906, Ahmad is believed to have prophesied the martyrdom of another three of his followers, when he claimed to have received the Arabic revelation, "Three goats will be slaughtered". According to Ahmadi commentators this revelation referred to the 1924-1925 killings of Moulvi Naimatullah Khan, Moulvi Abdul Haleem, and Qari Noor Ali, all leading religious figures among the Ahmadiyya members in Afghanistan. The killings occurred despite the fact that the Ahmadi Muslims congratulated the then emir, Amanullah Khan, in 1922, for granting religious freedom to his people.

== See also ==
- Islam in Afghanistan
