= Sardar Shireendil Khan =

19th-century governor of Khost, Afghanistan

Sardar Shireendil Khan was a former governor of Khost, Afghanistan, who took part in the Royal Commission for setting up of Boundary which was set up in 1893, during rule of Amir Abdur Rahman Khan of Afghanistan, to negotiate terms with the British, for the agreeing to the Durand line between Afghanistan and the British governed India.

Afghanistan was represented by Sahibzada Abdul Latif and Sardard Shireendil Khan representing King Amir Abdur Rahman Khan. From the British side the camp was attended by Sir Mortimer Durand and Sahibzada Abdul Qayyum, Political Agent Khyber. The two parties camped at Parachinar, now part of FATA Pakistan, which is near Khost, Afghanistan.
