= Durand Line =

International border between Afghanistan and Pakistan

Afghanistan–Pakistan border
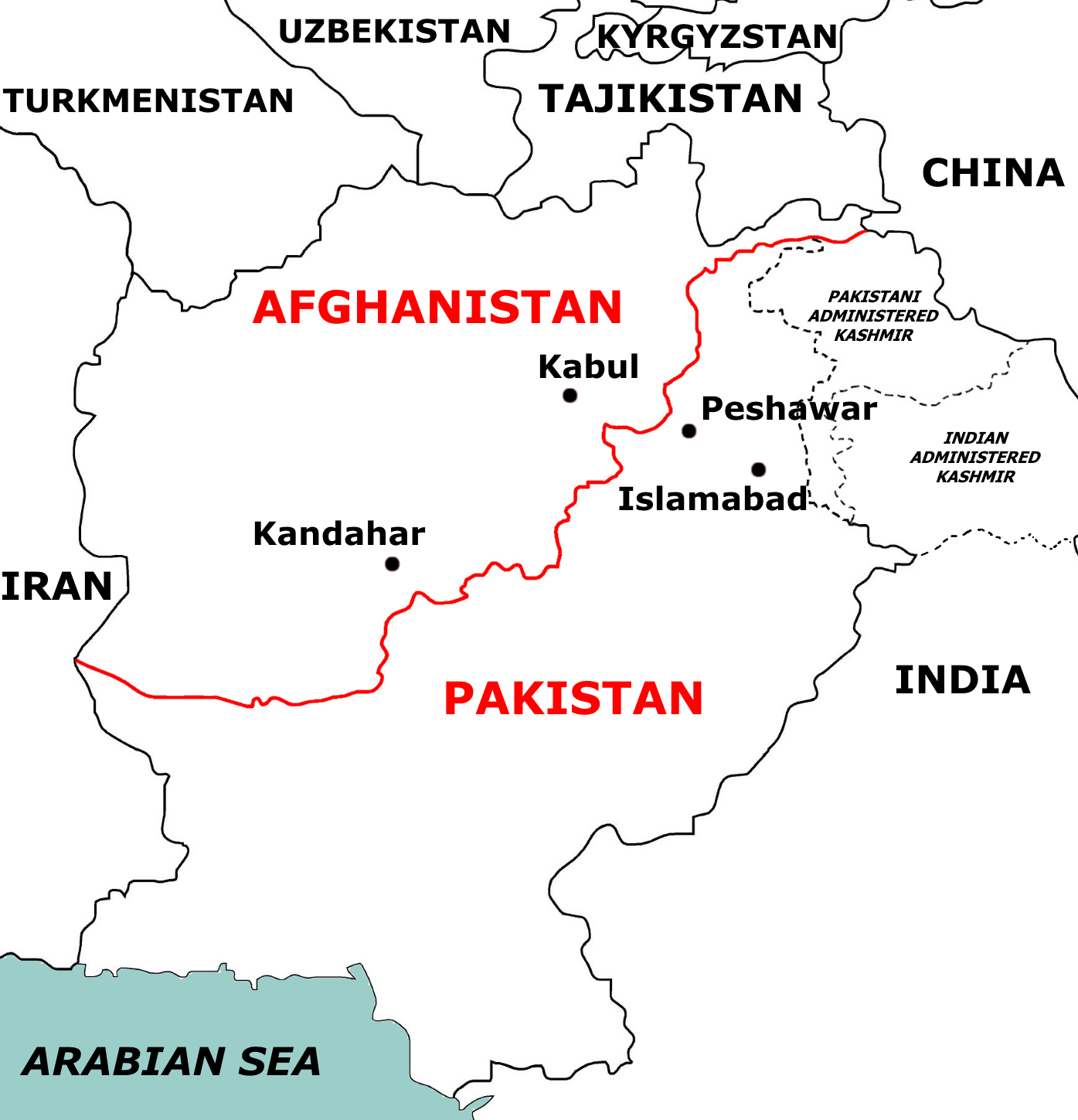
- Map marking the Durand Line border in red

Characteristics
- Entities: Afghanistan, Pakistan
- Length: 2,640 km (1,640 mi)

History
- Established: 12 November 1893; Signing of the Durand Line Agreement at the end of the first phase of the Second Anglo-Afghan War
- Current shape: 8 August 1919; Anglo-Afghan Treaty of 1919 ratified at the end of the Third Anglo-Afghan War
- Treaties: Treaty of Gandamak, Durand Line Agreement, Treaty of Rawalpindi

The Durand Line, (Note: Dari: خط دیورند; Pashto: د ډیورنډ کرښه; Urdu: ڈیورنڈ لکیر) also known as the Afghanistan–Pakistan International border, is a 2,640-kilometre (1,640 mi) international border between Afghanistan and Pakistan. (Note: India also claims to have a border with Afghanistan on the eastern part of the Durand Line due to its claim on Kashmir. (See Borders of India#Land borders of India.)) The western end runs to the border with Iran and the eastern end to the border with China.

The Durand Line was established in 1893 as the international border between the Emirate of Afghanistan and the British Indian Empire by Mortimer Durand, a British diplomat of the Indian Civil Service, and Abdur Rahman Khan, the Emir of Afghanistan, to fix the limit of their respective spheres of influence and improve diplomatic relations and trade. The single-page agreement, dated 12 November 1893, contains seven short articles, including a commitment not to exercise interference beyond the Durand Line. A joint British-Afghan demarcation survey took place starting from 1894, covering some 1,300 kilometres (800 mi) of the border.

Established towards the end of the British–Russian "Great Game" rivalry, the resulting line established Afghanistan as a buffer zone between British and Russian interests in the region. The line created Wakhan Corridor as buffer between British and Russian empires and granted Nuristan (then known as Kafiristan) and parts of Chitral to Afghanistan, while giving up claims to Waziristan and Chageh. It also permitted arms imports from British India and increased the subsidy given to Afghanistan from 1.2 to 1.8 million rupees. The line, as modified and ratified by the Anglo-Afghan Treaty of 1919, was inherited by Pakistan in 1947, following its independence. From a geopolitical and geostrategic perspective, it has been described as one of the most dangerous borders in the world.

The Durand Line is internationally recognized as the western border of Pakistan, although it remains largely unrecognised in Afghanistan. However many non-Pashtun ethnic groups in Afghanistan, such as Tajiks and Hazaras, have expressed its recognition. In April 2017, the Tajik politician Abdul Latif Pedram and his National Congress Party (NCP) recognised the Durand Line as the official border, which sparked outrage from the Pashtun nationalists. In February 2026, a Hazara politician Taher Zohair, the former governor of Bamyan, said that "Durand is an official border and whoever does not accept it is irrational".

== Background ==
The area through which the Durand Line runs became a part of Achaemenid Empire in 2500 BCE, followed by Seleucids, Mauryas, Kushans, and after the conquest of Sasanian Empire, of Arab caliphates. Arab Muslims conquered the area in the 7th century and introduced Islam to the Pashtuns. It is believed that some of the early Arabs also settled among the Pashtuns in the Sulaiman Mountains. Muslim conquests were followed by the Ghaznavid Empire in the 10th century, who in turn were succeeded by a variety of Islamic kingdoms including the Ghurids, Timurids, and Mughals, until 1748, when shortly after the death of Nader Shah Afshar, Durrani Empire was established by Ahmad Shah Abdali. The empire founded by Ahmad Shah disintegrated after his death in 1772 but Dost Mohammad Khan restored order in most parts in 1826. However, areas such as Peshawar were lost to the Sikhs in 1834.

The term "Afghanistan" was officially used in 1855, when the British recognized Dost Mohammad Khan as king of Afghanistan. Previously, the region was known as Khorasan.

In 1839, during the First Anglo-Afghan War, British-led Indian forces invaded Afghanistan and initiated a war with the Afghan rulers. Two years later, in 1842, the British were defeated and the war ended. The British again invaded Afghanistan in 1878, during the Second Anglo-Afghan War. The British decided to support Abdur Rahman Khan and the Treaty of Gandamak was signed in 1880, under which Afghanistan ceded control of various frontier areas to British India. The British failed in their objective to maintain a British resident in Kabul but having attained their other geopolitical objectives, the British withdrew.

== Durand Line Agreement ==
In October 1882, Amir Abdul Rehman Khan sent a letter to the viceroy of the British Indian Empire for addressing the need of Indo-Afghan border. In 1892, the viceroy, Lord Lansdowne, appointed Major General Frederick Roberts, for settling the issue. However, the amir showed reluctance to this appointment due to the active role of Major General Frederick Roberts in Second Anglo-Afghan War. In 1893, Mortimer Durand was dispatched to Kabul by the Government of India to sign an agreement with Amir Abdur Rahman Khan for fixing the limits of their respective spheres of influence as well as improving diplomatic relations and trade. On 12 November 1893, the Durand Line Agreement was reached. The two parties later camped at Parachinar, a small town near Khost in Afghanistan, which is now in Kurram District of Pakistan, to delineate the frontier.

From the British-Indian side, the camp was attended by Mortimer Durand and Sahibzada Abdul Qayyum, Political Agent Khyber Agency representing the Viceroy of India and Governor General of India. The Afghan side was represented by Sahibzada Abdul Latif and a former governor of Khost Province in Afghanistan, Sardar Shireendil Khan, representing Amir Abdur Rahman Khan. The original 1893 Durand Line Agreement was written in English, with translated copies in Dari.

== Demarcation surveys on the Durand Line ==
The initial and primary demarcation, a joint Indo-Afghan survey and mapping effort, covered 1,300 kilometres (800 mi) and took place from 1894 to 1896. Detailed topographic maps locating hundreds of boundary demarcation pillars were soon published and are available in the Survey of India collection at the British Library.

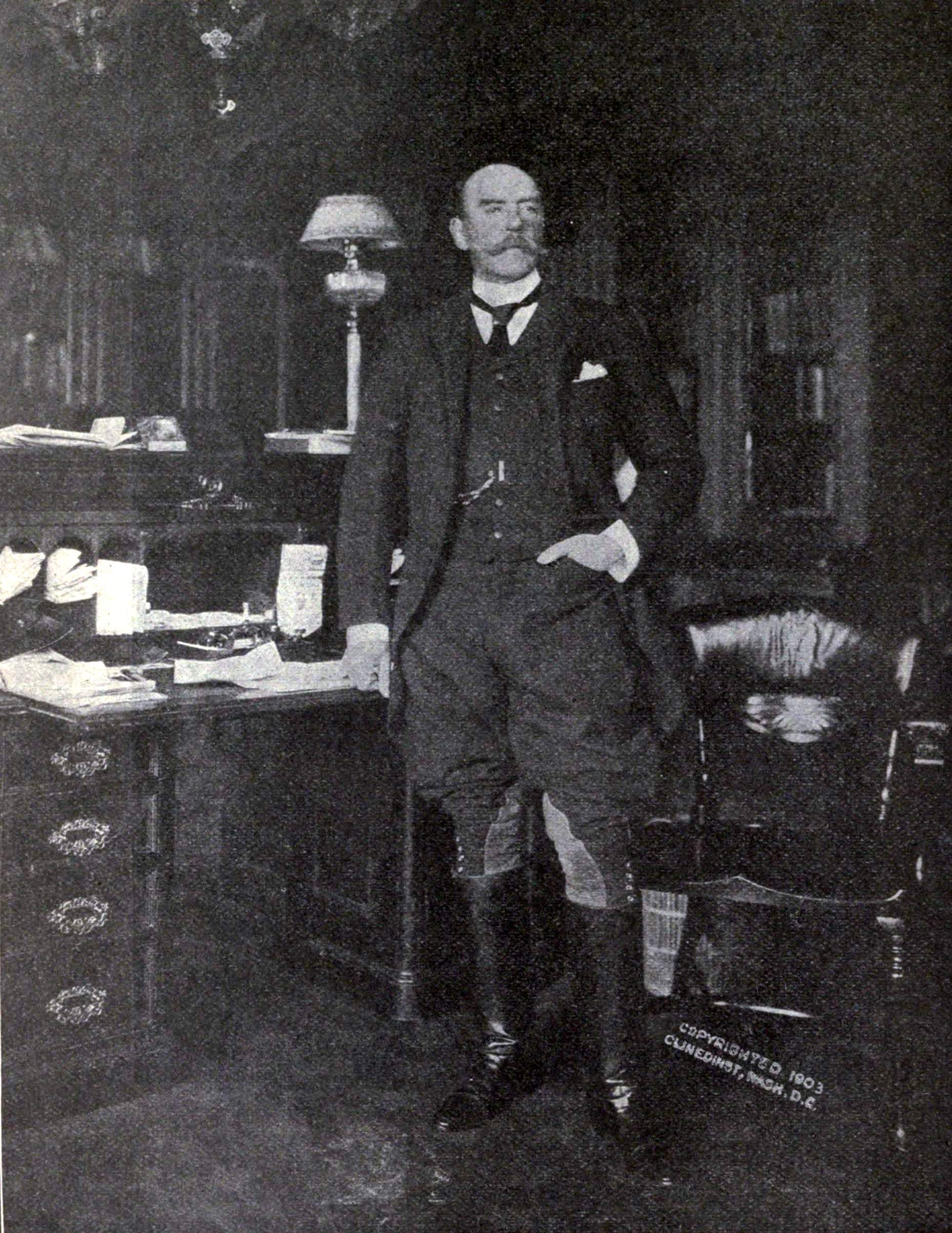
Sir Henry Mortimer Durand, British diplomat and civil servant in British India. The Durand Line is named in his honour.

The complete 20-page text of these detailed joint Indo-Afghan demarcation surveys is available in several sources.

In 1896, the long stretch from the Kabul River to China, including the Wakhan Corridor, was declared demarcated by virtue of its continuous, distinct watershed ridge-line, leaving only the section near the Khyber Pass to be finally demarcated in the treaty of 22 November 1921, signed by Mahmud Tarzi, "Chief of the Afghan Government for the conclusion of the treaty" and "Henry R. C. Dobbs, Envoy Extraordinary and Chief of the British Mission to Kabul." A very short adjustment to the demarcation was made at Arundu (Arnawai) in 1933–34.

The Pak-Afghan Border was demarcated by three boundary commissions:

=== Asmar Boundary Commission ===
It was to demarcate the border along Chitral down to Khyber Agency. Under the Clause III of the Durand Line Agreement, Asmar in Kunar Valley as far as Chanak was ceded to Afghanistan, while Bashgal Valley was retained within Chitral. (Note: Clause III: The British Government thus agrees to His Highness the Amir retaining Asmar and the valley above it, as far as Chanak. His Highness agrees, on the other hand, that he will at no time exercise interference in Swat, Bajaur, or Chitral, including the Arnawai or Bashgal valley.) The British government appointed Richard Udny, the Chief Commissioner of Peshawar, while the Afghan side was represented by Ghulam Haidar Khan, the Commander-in-Chief. When the two parties met at Jalalabad on 21 August 1894, Afghans made a claim over Bashgal and Nasrat, which had been placed in Chitral by the Durand Agreement, and the commission could not proceed for over four months. Udny again visited Jalalabad in December, but Khan maintained claims over the territories. Finally, the British Agent at Gilgit, Sir George Scott Robertson, advised Udny to give the areas to the stronger party of the two i.e Afghanistan. Hence a new agreement at Nashagam was signed on 9 April 1895, under which Nasrat and Bashgal, along with other areas, were ceded to Afghanistan. The 210 kilometres long stretch from Nawa Kotal to Hindu Kush was demarcated by the Asmar Boundary Commission. However, it again reached a deadlock when the Afghan side claimed Bajaur as well, and further work stopped.

In 1912, Afghanistan captured an additional area of Chitral along Arandu known as Dokalim. Initially British government protested but finally recognised it as Afghan territory when Sardar Faiz Muhammad Khan and Sir Richard Roy Maconachie signed a treaty on 3 February 1934.

The border along Khyber and Mohmand between Nawa Kotal and Sikaram was only demarcated after the Third Anglo-Afghan War, by a joint commission of Ghulam Nabi Khan of Afghanistan and John Maffey between 23 August and 2 September 1919.

The agreement allowed Emir Abdur Rahman to conquer Kafiristan during his 1895–1896 campaign. On the other hand, the loss of territories had a long lasting effect on Chitral as it lost the only all weather route to Dir. Until the construction of Lowari Tunnel, Chitral remained cut off from rest of the country during winter.

=== Afghan-Waziristan Boundary Commission ===
It was to demarcate portion from Sikaram to Domandi along Waziristan. The Afghan side was represented by Sardar Sherin Dil Khan, the Deputy Governor of Khost, and Sardar Gul Muhammad Khan, while the British government appointed Lucas White King, H. A. Anderson and J. S. Donald. The demarcation was completed by March 1895, with maps signed and exchanged. Both Emir and the Viceroy ratified the maps and the agreement.

=== Baluch-Afghan Boundary Commission ===
It was to demarcate the 330 miles long border along Baluchistan from Domandi all the way to Koh Malek-Siah, at the tri-point of Iran, British India and Afghanistan. Emir Abdur Rahman appointed Gul Muhammad Khan while British Indian government was represented by Arthur Henry McMahon. The first section, from Domandi to Chaman, was demarcated and signed by 26 February 1895, with maps exchanged. The second section, from Chaman to Koh Malek-Siah, faced difficulties due to growing Afghan claims. MacMahon made concessions on various points. Finally, the demarcation was completed by 13 May 1896.

=== Third Anglo-Afghan war and the treaty of Rawalpindi ===
The Durand Line triggered a long-running controversy between the governments of Afghanistan and British India, especially after the outbreak of the Third Anglo-Afghan War when Afghanistan's capital (Kabul) and its eastern city of Jalalabad were bombed by the No. 31 and No. 114 Squadrons of the British Royal Air Force in May 1919. Afghan rulers reaffirmed in the 1919, 1921, and 1930 treaties to accept the Indo-Afghan frontier.

The Afghan Government accepts the Indo–Afghan frontier accepted by the late Amir

— Article V of the August 8, 1919 Treaty of Rawalpindi

The two high contracting parties mutually accept the Indo-Afghan frontier as accepted by the Afghan Government under Article V of the Treaty concluded on August 8, 1919

— Article II of the November 22, 1921 finalising of the Treaty of Rawalpindi

== Post-1947 events ==
Pakistan inherited the 1893 agreement and the subsequent 1919 Treaty of Rawalpindi after the partition from the British India in 1947. There has never been a formal ratification between Islamabad and Kabul. Pakistan believes, and international convention under uti possidetis juris supports, the position that it should not require an agreement to set the boundary; courts in several countries around the world and the Vienna Convention have universally upheld via uti possidetis juris that binding bilateral agreements are "passed down" to successor states. Thus, a unilateral declaration by one party has no effect; boundary changes must be made bilaterally.

At the time of independence, the indigenous Pashtun people living on the border with Afghanistan were given only the choice of becoming a part either of India or Pakistan as rest of subcontinent. Further, by the time of the Indian independence movement, prominent Pashtun nationalists such as Abdul Ghaffar Khan and his Khudai Khidmatgar movement advocated a united India, and not a united Afghanistan — highlighting the extent to which infrastructure and instability together began to erode Pashtun self-identification with Afghanistan. By the time of independence, popular opinion amongst Pashtuns was split amongst the majority who wished to join the newly formed state of Pakistan, and the minority who wished to become a part of the Dominion of India. When the idea of a united India failed, Ghaffar Khan pledged allegiance to Pakistan and started campaigning for the autonomy of Pakistan's Pashtuns.

On 26 July 1949, when Afghan–Pakistan relations were rapidly deteriorating, a loya jirga was held in Afghanistan after a military aircraft from the Pakistan Air Force bombed a village on the Afghan side of the Durand Line in response to cross-border attacks from the Afghan side. In response, the Afghan government illegally and unilaterally declared that it recognised "neither the imaginary Durand nor any similar line" and that all previous Durand Line agreements were void. They also announced that the Durand ethnic division line had been imposed on them under coercion/duress and was a diktat. This had no tangible effect as there has never been a move in the United Nations to enforce such a declaration due to both nations being constantly busy in wars with their other neighbours (See Indo-Pakistani wars and Civil war in Afghanistan). In 1950 the House of Commons of the United Kingdom held its view on the Afghan-Pakistan dispute over the Durand Line by stating:

His Majesty's Government in the United Kingdom has seen with regret the disagreements between the Governments of Pakistan and Afghanistan about the status of the territories on the North West Frontier. It is His Majesty's Government's view that Pakistan is in international law the inheritor of the rights and duties of the old Government of India and of his Majesty's Government in the United Kingdom in these territories and that the Durand Line is the international frontier.

— Philip Noel-Baker, June 30, 1950

At the 1956 SEATO (Southeast Asia Treaty Organization) Ministerial Council Meeting held at Karachi, capital of Pakistan at the time, it was stated:

The members of the Council declared that their governments recognised that the sovereignty of Pakistan extends up to the Durand Line, the international boundary between Pakistan and Afghanistan, and it was consequently affirmed that the Treaty area referred to in Articles IV and VIII of the Treaty includes the area up to that Line.

— SEATO, March 8, 1956

In June 1976, a summit was held between the governments of Pakistan and Afghanistan which both sides made concessions, Pakistan publicly recognising the existence of the Pashtunistan question which was a key part of Afghan foreign policy for decades, and the Afghans were willing to hold high-level bilateral talks without bringing up the subject regarding the fate of Wali Khan and his banned National Awami Party in Pakistan which the Pakistanis considered as "internal matters".

=== Soviet Afghan war ===
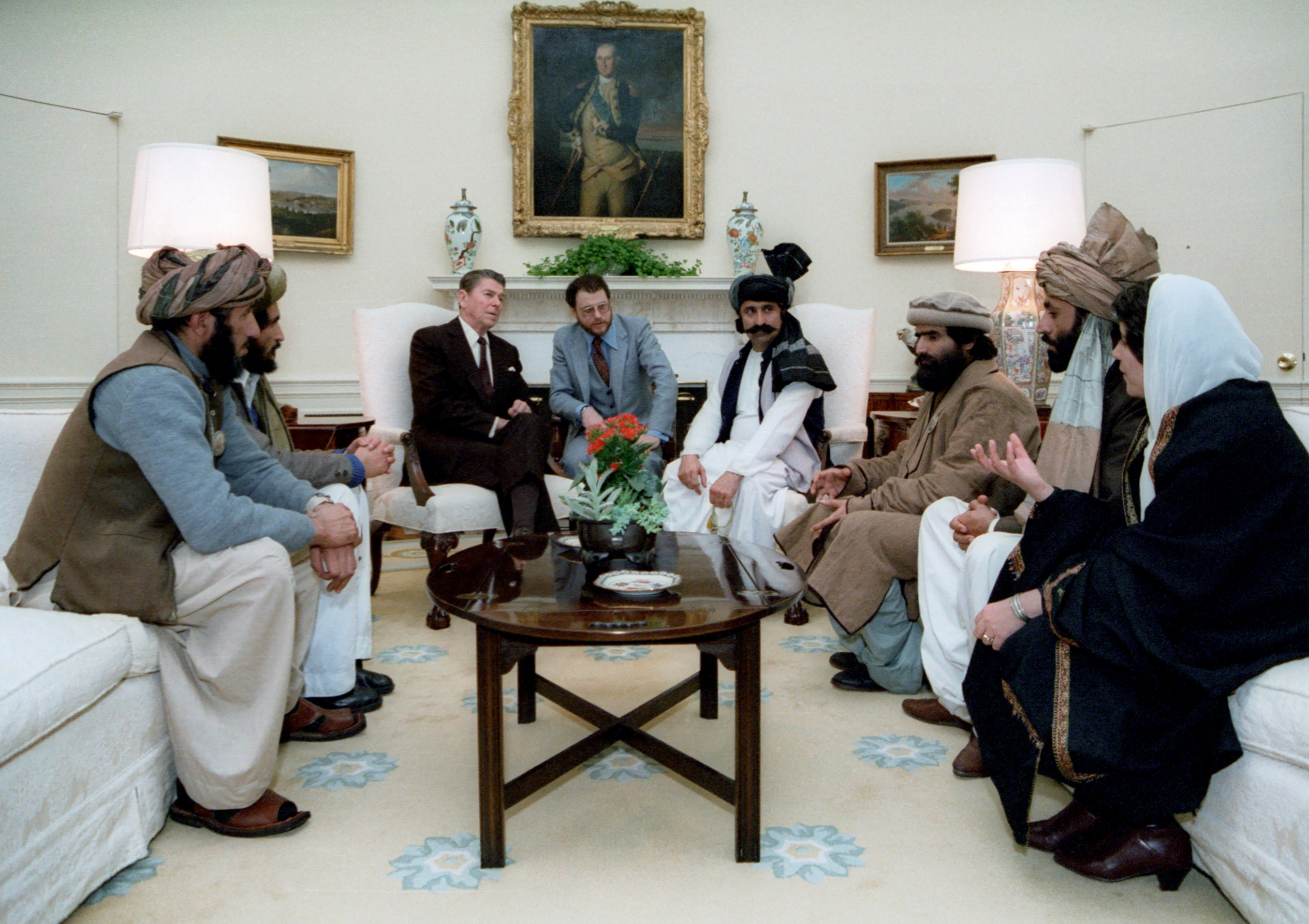
Afghan mujahideen representatives with President Ronald Reagan at the White House in 1983

During Operation Cyclone, the ISI, with support and funding from the Central Intelligence Agency (CIA) of the United States, recruited mujahideen militant groups on the Pakistani side of the Durand line to cross into Afghanistan's territory for missions to topple the Soviet-backed Afghan government. Afghanistan KHAD was one of two secret service agencies believed to have been conducting bombings in parts of the North West Frontier (now Khyber Pakhtunkhwa) during the early 1980s. U.S State Department blamed WAD (a KGB-created Afghan secret intelligence agency) for terrorist bombings in Pakistan's cities in 1987 and 1988. It is also believed that Afghanistan's PDPA government supported the leftist Al-Zulfiqar organization of Pakistan, the group accused of the 1981 hijacking of a Pakistan International Airlines plane from Karachi to Kabul.

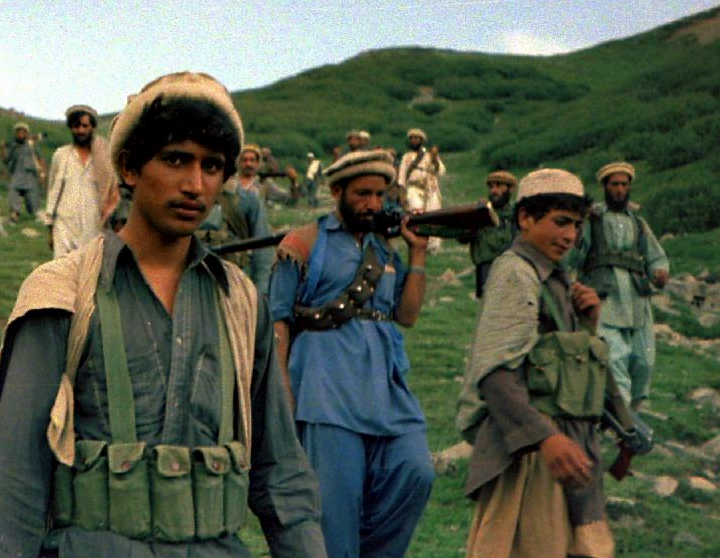
CIA-funded and ISI-trained mujahideen fighters crossing the Durand Line to fight the Soviet-backed Afghan government in 1985

After the collapse of the pro-Soviet Afghan government in 1992, Pakistan, despite Article 2 of the Durand Line Agreement which states "The Government of India will at no time exercise interference in the territories lying beyond this line on the side of Afghanistan", attempted to create a state friendly to Pakistan in Afghanistan prior to Taliban control according to US Special Envoy on Afghanistan Peter Tomsen. According to a summer 2001 report in The Friday Times, even the Taliban leaders challenged the very existence of the Durand Line when former Afghan Interior Minister Abdur Razzaq and a delegation of about 95 Taliban visited Pakistan. The Taliban refused to endorse the Durand Line despite pressure from Islamabad, arguing that there shall be no borders among Muslims. When the Taliban government was removed in late 2001, the Afghan President Hamid Karzai also began resisting the Durand Line, and today the present Government of Afghanistan does not recognize Durand Line as its international border. No Afghan government has recognized the Durand Line as its border since 1947.

A line of hatred that raised a wall between the two brothers.

— Hamid Karzai

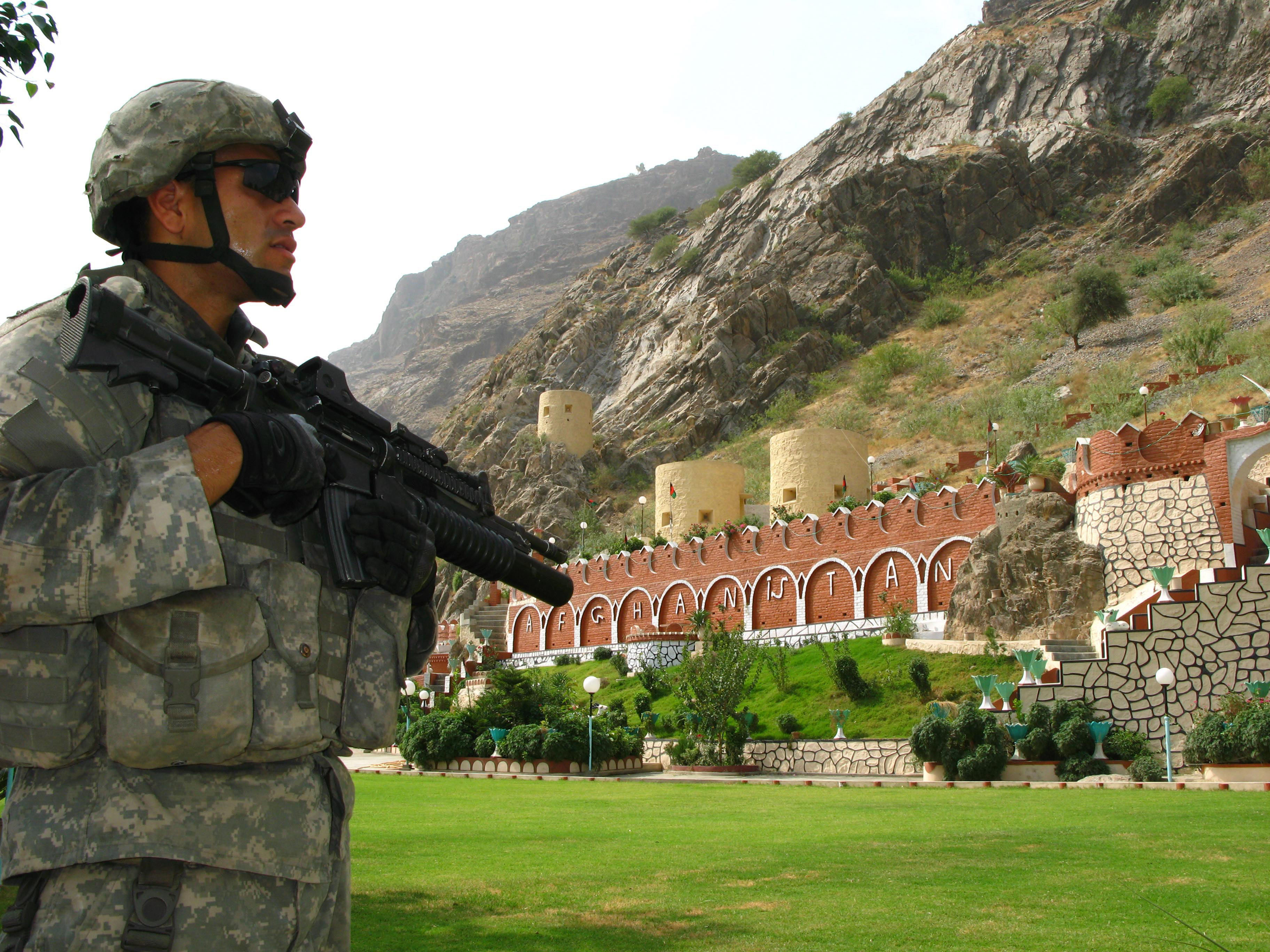
A U.S. soldier at Torkham border crossing, 2007

The Afghan Geodesy and Cartography Head Office (AGCHO) depicts the line on their maps as a de facto border, including naming the "Durand Line 2310 km (1893)" as an "International Boundary Line" on their home page. However, a map in an article from the Pashtun-dominated Government of Afghanistan not only refuses to recognise the Durand Line as the international border between the two countries, it claims that the Pashtun territories of Pakistan rightly belong to Afghanistan. The Durand Line Agreement makes no mention of a time limit, thus suggesting the treaty has no expiry date. In 2004, spokespersons of U.S. State Department's Office of the Geographer and Global Issues and British Foreign and Commonwealth Office also pointed out that the Durand Line Agreement has no mention of an expiry date.

Recurrent claims that (the) Durand Treaty expired in 1993 are unfounded. Cartographic depictions of boundary conflict with each other, but Treaty depictions are clear.

— A spokesperson for U.S. State Department's Office of the Geographer and Global Issues

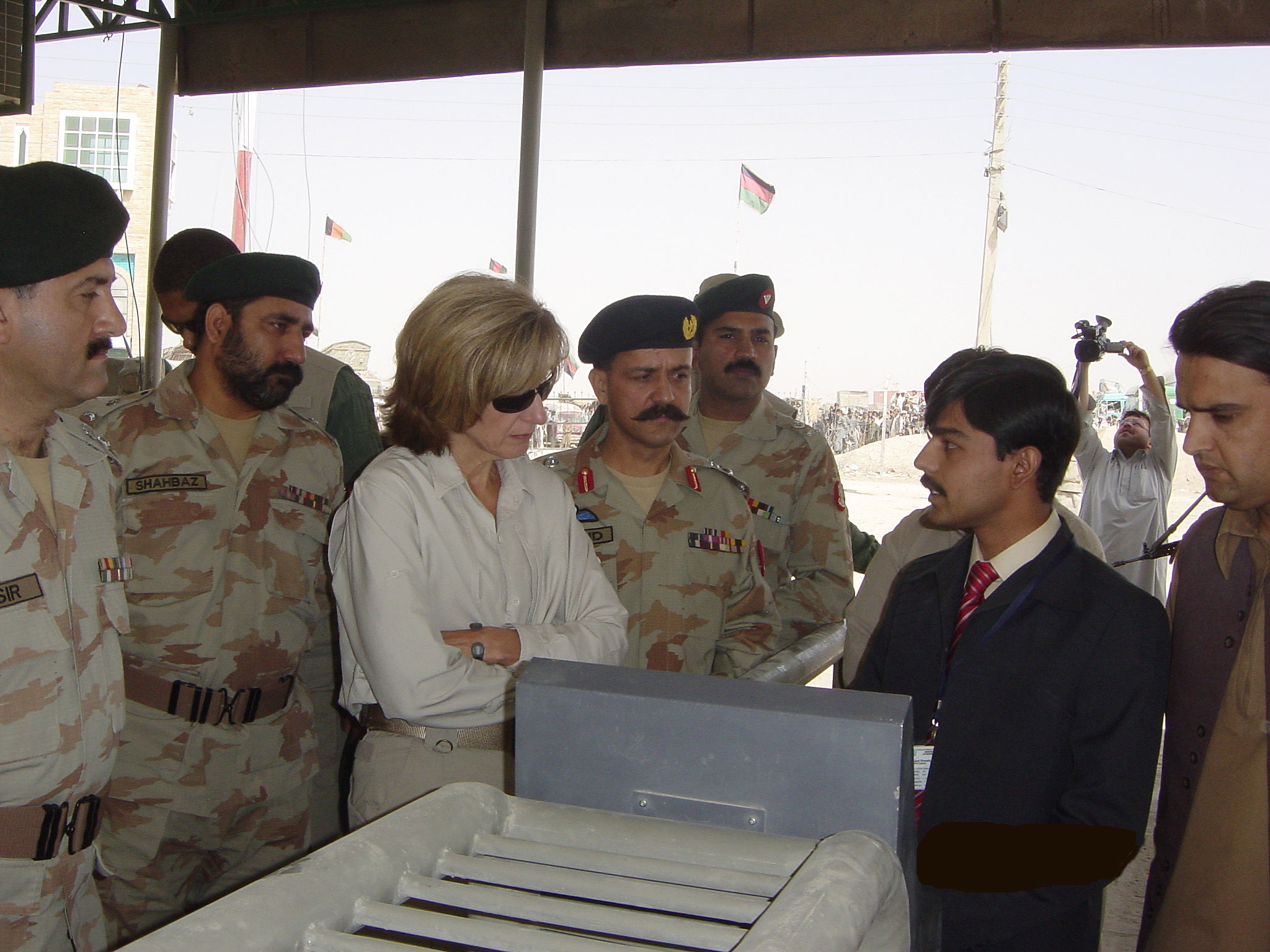
US DEA Administrator Karen P. Tandy with Pakistani Frontier Corps and government officials right in front of the Afghan-Pakistani border

Because the Durand Line divides the Pashtun and Baloch people, it continues to be a source of tension between the governments of Pakistan and Afghanistan. In August 2007, Pakistani politician and the leader of Jamiat Ulema-e-Islam, Fazal-ur-Rehman, urged Afghanistan to recognise the Durand Line. Press statements from 2005 to 2007 by former Pakistani President Musharraf calling for the building of a fence on the Durand Line have been met with resistance from numerous Pashtun political parties in Afghanistan. Pashtun politicians in Afghanistan strenuously object to even the existence of the Durand Line border. In 2006 Afghan President Hamid Karzai warned that "Iran and Pakistan and others are not fooling anyone."

If they don't stop, the consequences will be ... that the region will suffer with us equally. In the past we have suffered alone; this time everybody will suffer with us.... Any effort to divide Afghanistan ethnically or weaken it will create the same thing in the neighboring countries. All the countries in the neighborhood have the same ethnic groups that we have, so they should know that it is a different ball game this time.

— Hamid Karzai, February 17, 2006

Aimal Faizi, spokesman for the Afghan President, stated in October 2012 that the Durand Line is "an issue of historical importance for Afghanistan. The Afghan people, not the government, can take a final decision on it."

=== Border skirmishes ===
In July 2003, Pakistani and Afghan forces clashed over border posts. The Afghan government claimed that the Pakistani military established bases up to 600 meters inside Afghanistan in the Yaqubi area near bordering Mohmand District. The Yaqubi and Yaqubi Kandao (Pass) area were later found to fall within Afghanistan. In 2007, Pakistan erected fences and posts a few hundred metres inside Afghanistan near the border-straddling bazaar of Angoor Ada in South Waziristan, but the Afghan National Army quickly removed them and began shelling Pakistani positions. Leaders in Pakistan said the fencing was a way to prevent Taliban militants from crossing over between the two nations, but Afghan President Hamid Karzai believed that it is Islamabad's plan to permanently separate the Pashtun tribes. Special Forces from the United States Army were based at Shkin, Afghanistan, seven kilometres west of Angoor Ada, from 2002. In 2009, the International Security Assistance Force (ISAF) and American CIA began using unmanned aerial vehicles from the Afghan side to hit terrorist targets on the Pakistani side of the Durand Line.

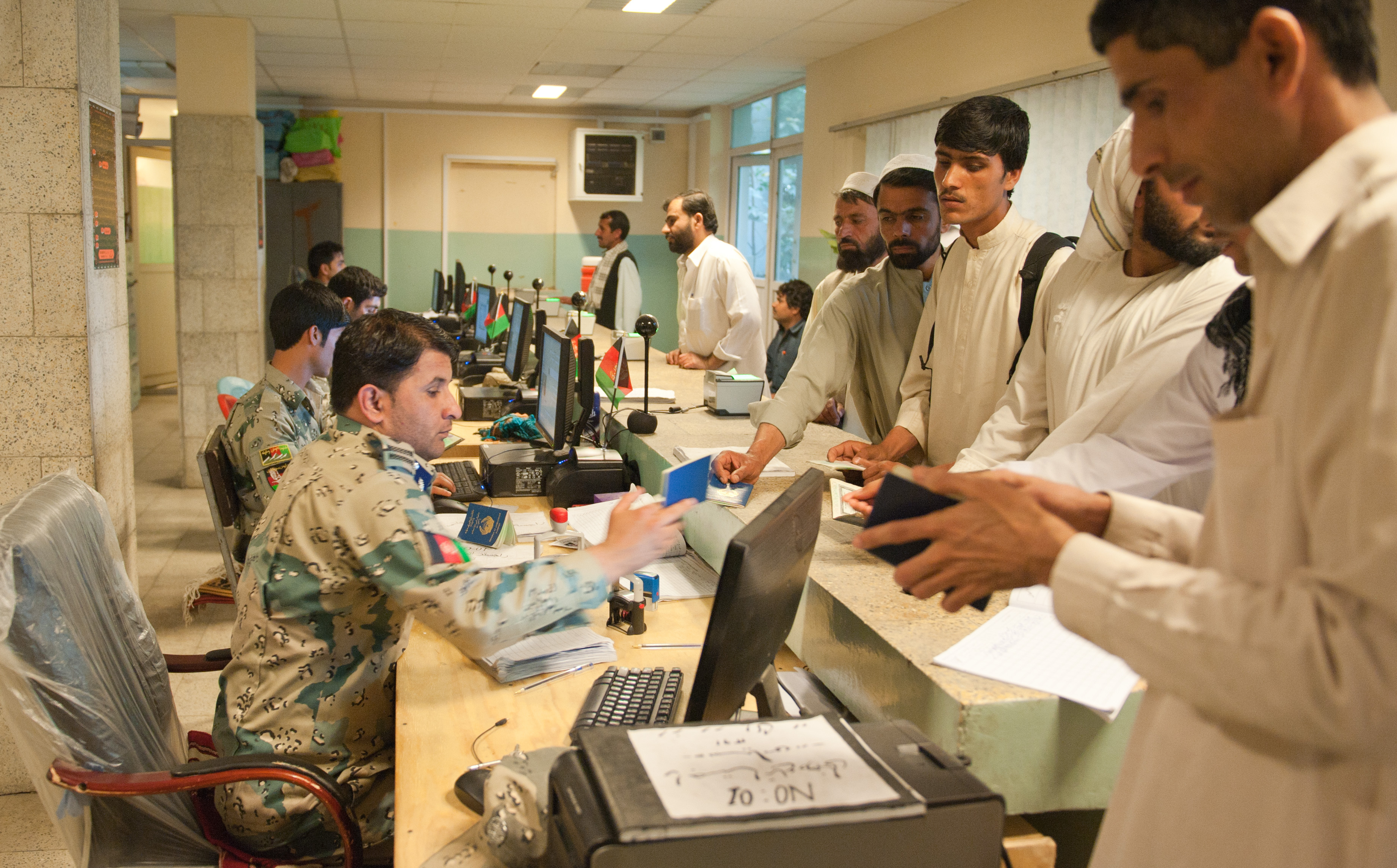
Afghan Border Police check travellers' passports at Torkham Gate in Nangarhar province

The border area between Afghanistan and Pakistan has long been one of the most dangerous places in the world, due largely to very little government control. It is legal and common in the region to carry guns, and assault rifles and explosives are common. Many forms of illegal activities take place, such as smuggling of weapons, narcotics, lumber, copper, gemstones, marble, vehicles, and electronic products, as well as ordinary consumer goods. Kidnappings and murders are frequent. Militants frequently cross the border from both sides to conduct attacks. In June 2011 more than 500 Taliban militants entered Upper Dir area from Afghanistan and killed more than 30 Pakistani security forces. Police said the attackers targeted a checkpost, destroyed two schools and several houses, while killing a number of civilians.

The governments of Pakistan and Afghanistan are both trying to extend the rule of law into the border areas. At the same time, the United States is reviewing the Reconstruction Opportunity Zones (ROZ) Act in Washington, D.C., which is supposed to help the economic status of the Pashtun and Baloch tribes by providing jobs to a large number of the population on both sides of the Durand Line border.

Much of the northern and central Durand line is quite mountainous, where crossing the border is often only practical in the numerous passes through the mountains. Border crossing is very common, especially among Pashtuns who cross to meet relatives or to work. The movement of people across the border has largely been unchecked or uncontrolled, although passports and visas are at times checked at official crossings. In June 2011 the United States installed a biometric system at the border crossing near Spin Boldak, aimed at improving the security situation and blocking the infiltration of insurgents into southern Afghanistan.

Throughout June and into July 2011, Pakistan Chitral Scouts and local defence militias suffered deadly cross-border raids. In response the Pakistani military shelled some Afghan villages in Afghanistan's Nuristan, Kunar, Nangarhar, and Khost provinces resulting in a number of Afghan civilians being killed. Afghanistan's Interior Ministry claimed that nearly 800 rockets were fired from Pakistan, hitting civilian targets inside Afghanistan. The Afghan statement claimed that attacks by Pakistan resulted in the deaths of 42 Afghan civilians, including 30 men and 12 women and girls, wounded 55 others and destroyed 120 homes. Although Pakistan claimed it was an accident and just routine anti-Taliban operations, some analysts believe that it could have been a show of strength by Islamabad. For example, a senior official at the Council on Foreign Relations explained that because the shelling was of such a large scale, it was more likely a warning from Pakistan than an accident.

I'm speculating, but natural possibilities include a signal to Karzai and to (the United States) that we can't push Pakistan too hard.

— Stephen Biddle

The United States and other NATO states often ignored this sensitive issue, likely because of potential effects on their war strategy in Afghanistan. Their involvement could have strained relations and jeopardized their own national interests in the area. This came after the November 2011 NATO bombing in which 24 Pakistani soldiers were killed. In response to that incident, Pakistan decided to cut off all NATO supply lines as well as boost border security by installing anti-aircraft guns and radars to monitor air activity. Regarding the Durand Line, some rival maps are said to display discrepancies of as much as five kilometres.

=== Trench being built alongside the border ===
In June 2016, Pakistan announced that it had completed 1,100 km of trenches along the Pakistan-Afghanistan border (Durand Line) in Balochistan to check movement of terrorists and smugglers across border into Pakistan from Afghanistan. Plans to expand this trench/ berm/ fence work were announced in March 2017. The plans also included building 338 checkpoints and forts along the border by 2019.

=== 2017 border closure and reopening ===
On 16 February, Pakistan closed the border crossings at Torkham and Chaman due to security reasons following the Sehwan blast. On 7 March, the border was reopened for two days to facilitate the return of people to their respective countries who had earlier crossed the border on valid visas. The decision was taken after repeated requests by Afghanistan's government to avert 'a humanitarian crisis'. According to a Pakistani official, 24,000 Afghans returned to Afghanistan, while 700 Pakistanis returned to Pakistan, before the border was indefinitely closed again. On 20 March, Pakistani Prime Minister Nawaz Sharif ordered the reopening of Afghanistan–Pakistan border as a "goodwill gesture", 32 days after it was closed.

On 5 May, following an attack on Pakistani census team by Afghan forces and the resulting exchange of fire between the two sides, the border was closed again.

Pakistan's decision to close the border was to force Afghanistan to take action against militant groups who were using Afghanistan's soil to carry out cross-border attacks against Pakistan. An Afghan diplomat at the World Trade Organization (WTO) claimed that Afghanistan suffered a loss of 90 million U.S. dollars as a result of closure of border by Pakistan. On 27 May 2017, Pakistan reopened the border after a request from Afghan authorities, marking the end of the border closure that lasted 22 days.

In 2017, amid cross-border tensions, former Afghan President Hamid Karzai said that Afghanistan will "never recognise" the Durand Line as the border between the two countries.

=== 2026 ===
During the 2026 Afghanistan–Pakistan war, Pakistani forces reportedly seized 32-kilometre (20 mi) of the Ghudwana region. If true, then the Durand Line in its current form would be reduced from 2,640-kilometre (1,640 mi) to 2,608-kilometre (1,621 mi).

In April 2026, prominent Afghan politician Haji Muhammad Muhaqiq officially recognized the Durand Line.

== Geography ==
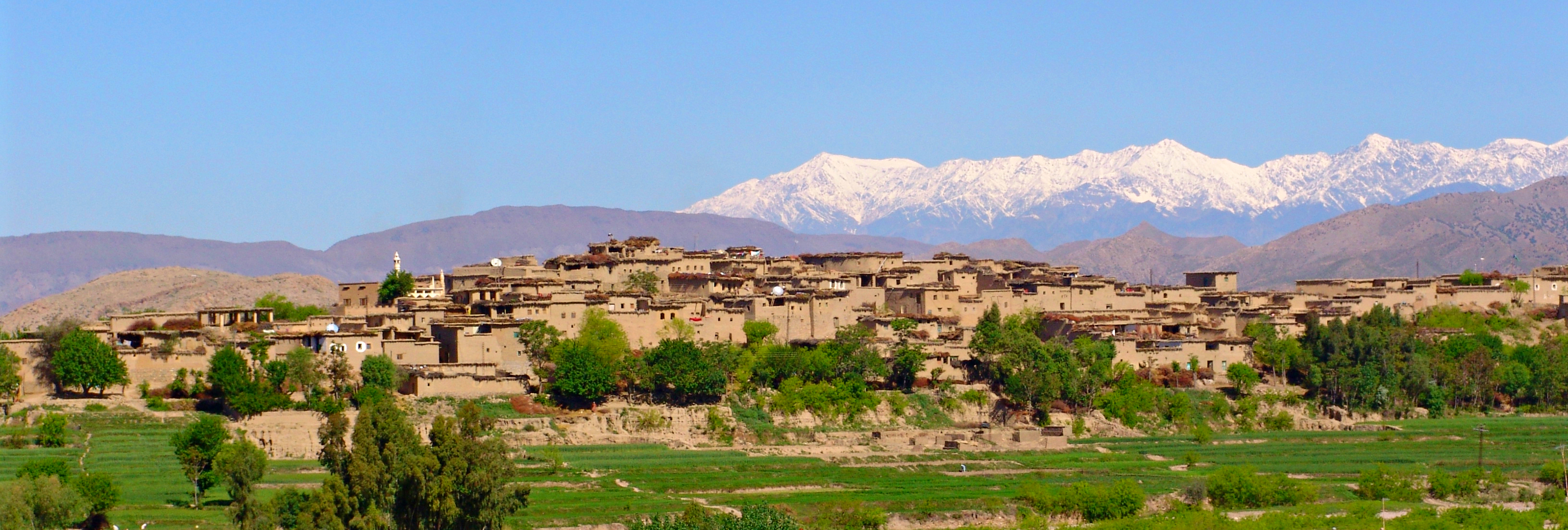
Borki, a village at the border, with Mount Sikaram's peak in the background, the highest peak of the White Mountains

The border is south of the Hindu Kush, while its eastern end by China is in the Karakoram range. These are regions of extreme high elevation, hence much of the Durand Line is bounded by mountains. The Spīn Ghar (White Mountains) range is roughly in the middle of the Line. The western part of the Line meanwhile is lower and sparse, consisting of the Registan Desert.

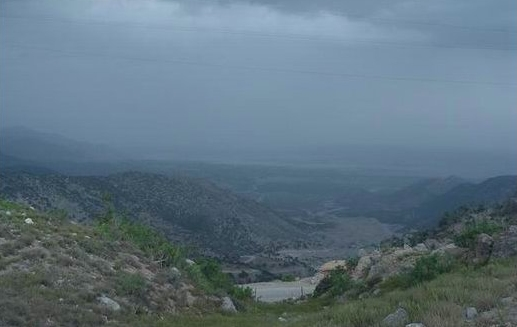
A view towards the border in Pakistan, taken in Paktia Province of Afghanistan

The highest peak, Noshaq, is located along the border between two countries.

The Kunar River, Kabul River, Kurram River and Gomal River all cross the Durand Line. At the very western end of the line is the Godzareh Depression.

=== Border regions ===
The border is 2,611 km (1,622 mi) long. Twelve Afghan provinces are located along the border: Nimroz, Helmand, Kandahar, Zabul, Paktika, Khost, Paktia, Logar, Nangarhar, Kunar, Nuristan and Badakhshan.

Khyber Pakhtunkhwa, Balochistan, and the Gilgit-Baltistan region of Pakistan share a border with the Durand Line.

== Border crossings and economy ==
The two countries are major trade partners, and therefore the various border crossings are economically important for the wider region, particularly the Torkham and Khyber Pass that is also the main land connection between Central Asia and the Indian subcontinent.

== Border barrier ==
Pakistan has been constructing a border barrier since 2017 to prevent terrorism, drug trafficking, refugees, illegal immigration, smuggling and infiltration across the Durand Line. According to Pakistan the barrier is also necessary to block the infiltration of militants across the border. By January 2019, 900 km had been completed. The Durand Line is marked by 235 crossing points, many of which had been susceptible to illegal immigration. The project is predicted to cost at least $532 million.

By 21 January 2022 the interior minister of Pakistan stated that only 20 km of fencing remained and that it would be completed soon.

As of April 2023, 98% of fencing and 85% of fortifications have been completed.

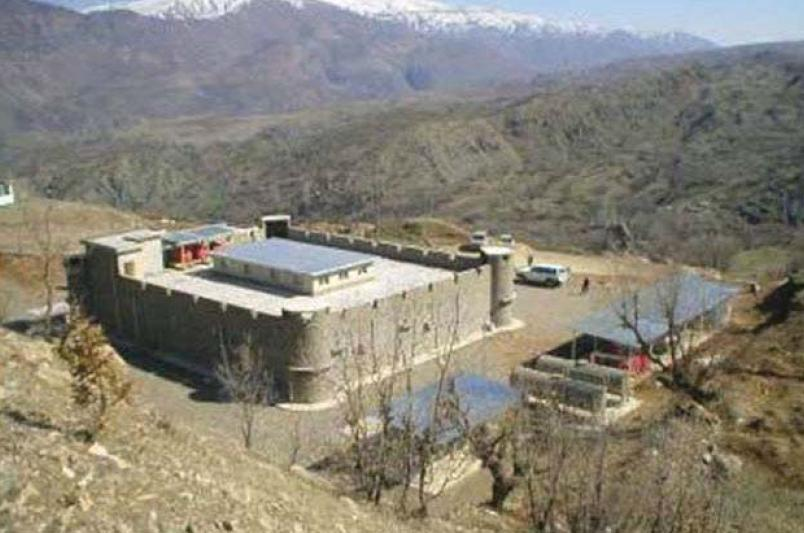
Military forts were constructed every one to three kilometers to guard the border against infiltration.

== See also ==
- Af-Pak
- Afghanistan–Pakistan border skirmishes
- Afghanistan–Pakistan Confederation plan
- Afghanistan–Pakistan relations
- Khyber Pass Economic Corridor
