= Sahibzada Abdul Latif =

Afghan royal adviser and Ahmadi martyr (1853–1903)

Raees-e-Kabul Shaheed Hazrat Sahibzada Sayyad Abdul Latif
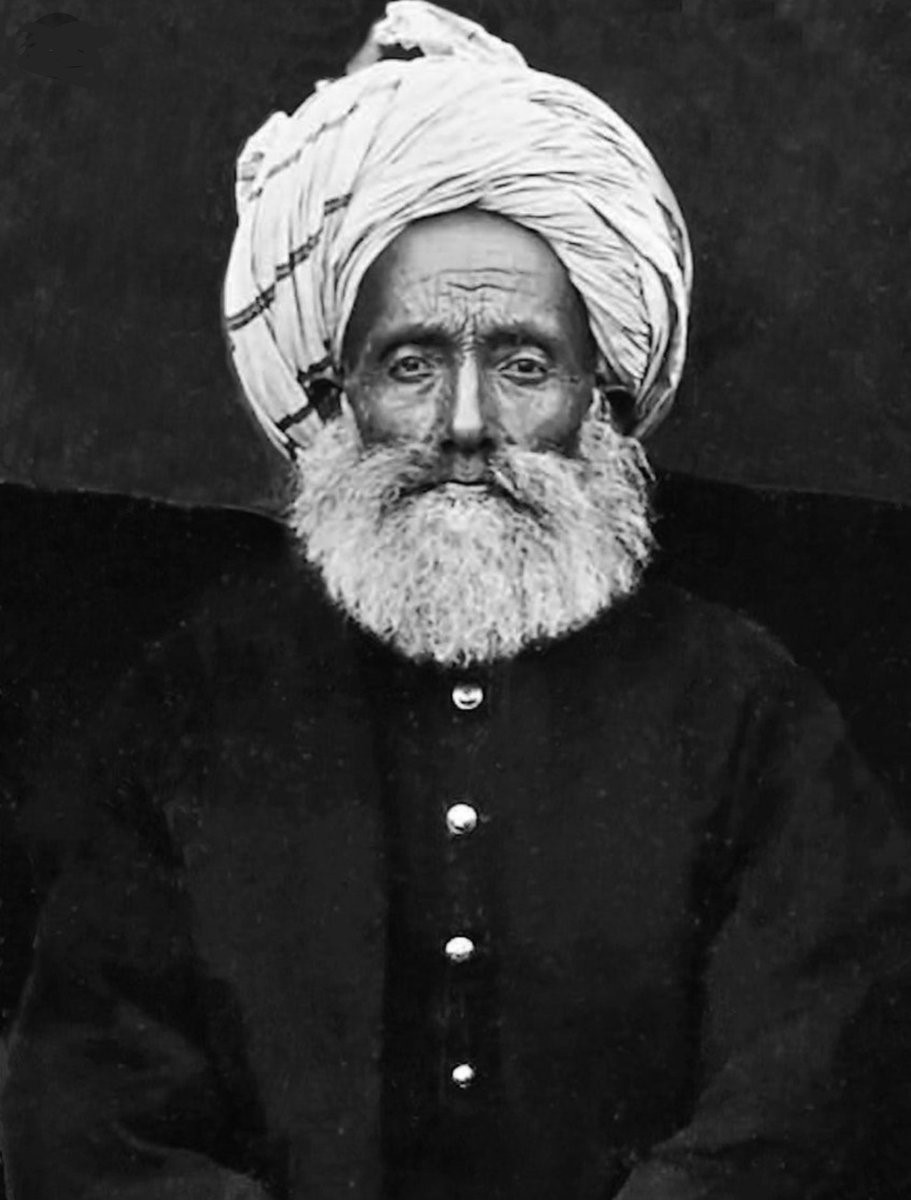
- Abdul Latif before 1901
- Born: 1853; Syed Gah, Khost, Emirate of Afghanistan
- Died: 14 July 1903 (aged 50); Kabul, Emirate of Afghanistan
- Cause of death: Stoning
- Spouse: Shahjahan Bibi
- Father: Shahibaza Mohammad Sharif

Royal Adviser to the Emir of Afghanistan
- In office 1880s – 14 July 1903
- Monarchs: Abdur Rahman Khan; Habibullah Khan

Hazrat Sahibzada Syed Abdul Latif Shaheed
- سید عبداللطیف
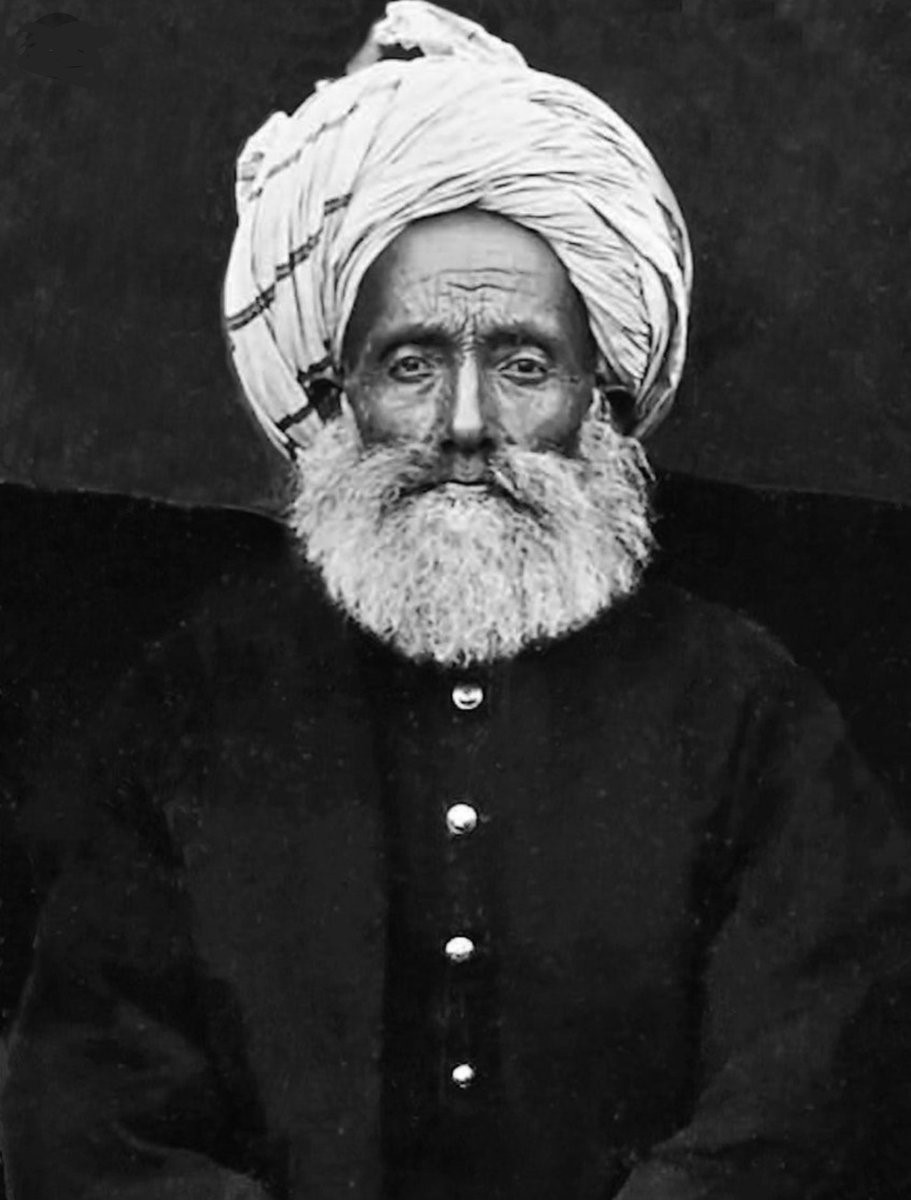
- Abdul Latif pictured in 1894 during the Durand Line Agreement

Royal Adviser to the Emir of Afghanistan
- In office 1880s – 14 July 1903

Personal life
- Born: 1853 Syed Gah, Khost, Emirate of Afghanistan (present-day Khost Province, Islamic Emirate of Afghanistan)
- Died: 14 July 1903 (Aged 50 - 51) Kabul, Emirate of Afghanistan (present-day Islamic Emirate of Afghanistan)
- Cause of death: Stoning
- Spouse: Shahjahan Bibi
- Parent: Sahibzada Muhammad Sharif (father)

Religious life
- Religion: Islam
- Sect: Ahmadiyya

Sayyad Abdul Latif (1853 – July 14, 1903) more commonly known as Sahibzada Abdul Latif among the Ahmadiyya Movement in Islam, was the Royal Advisor to Abdur Rahman Khan and Habibullah Khan, the father and son kings of Afghanistan in the late 19th century and early 20th century. It is believed that Abdul Latif helped King Abdur Rahman Khan during the negotiation of the Durand Line Agreement with the British India in 1893. In 1902 he became a follower of Mirza Ghulam Ahmad and is remembered as one of the first martyrs of the Ahmadiyya movement.

== Background ==
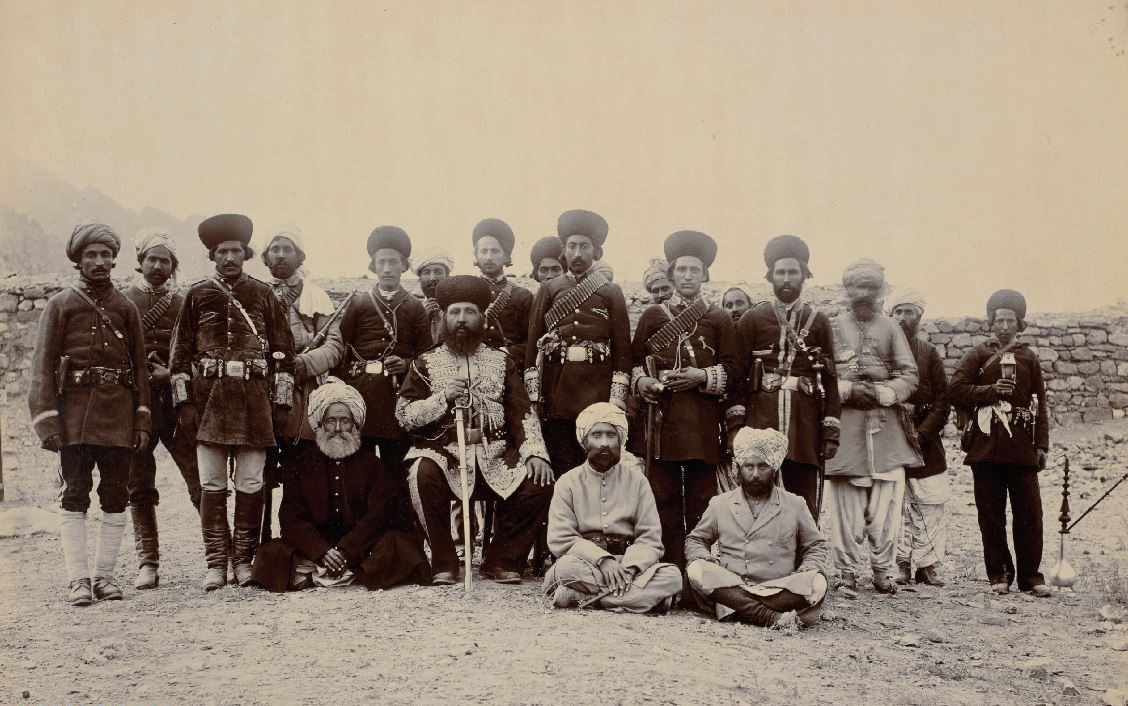
Abdul Latif seated to the right of Emir Abdur Rahman Khan

Abdul Latif was born in a village called Sayed Ga in what is now Khost Province of Afghanistan It is claimed that through his father, Sahibzada Mohammad Sharif, he is a descendant of Ali Hujwiri, a scholar during the 11th century who is buried in Lahore, Punjab, Pakistan Some referred to Abdul Latif by the title Raees-e-Kabul. He had thousands of pupils all over Afghanistan and students came to him from far regions of Central Asia

He was a learned man, fluent in Persian, Pashto, and Arabic. It is also claimed that he owned a large piece of land in Khost Province. Abdul Latif is often called the Sayyed-ul-Shuhada (leader of the Martyrs) within the Ahmadiyya Movement in Islam. He had visited Hoshiarpur, and frequented Deoband a city and a municipal board in Saharanpur district in the state of Uttar Pradesh India. It is famous for its Darul Uloom, about 150 km (93 mi) from Delhi. Abdul Latif was an eminent member of the Ulama of Afghanistan. He had great influence on the Afghan kings and its darbar; as claimed by Zahoor Ahmad, he had the honour to place the Amir's crown on the head of Habibullah Khan himself on the eve of his coronation in 1901.

At the time when the British were attempting to set the limit of King Abdur Rahman Khan's political sphere of influence, Abdul Latif and Sardar Shireendil Khan were chosen to represent the Afghan side.

In 1889 Abdul Latif heard about Mirza Ghulam Ahmad of Qadian, British India, who claimed to be the Promised Messiah and Imam Mahdi. He sent one of his pupils, Maulvi Abdur Rahman, to British India on a secret mission. Abdur Rahman returned after having accepted Mirza Ghulam Ahmad, and joining the Ahmadiyya Movement in Islam, bringing with him some books written by Mirza Ghulam Ahmad for him to read. After Abdul Latif read one of Mirza Ghulam Ahmad's books, he joined the Ahmadiyya Movement in Islam.

=== Death and legacy ===
In 1902, Abdul Latif asked Habibullah Khan for permission to make pilgrimage to Hajj in Mecca, Saudi Arabia. The King granted him permission and even presented him with a reasonable sum for his expenses. Abdul Latif reached Lahore in October 1902 accompanied by some of his pupils. On arrival, he discovered that a plague had spread in India and the Ottoman Government had imposed restrictions on people coming from British India. Instead of going for Hajj as he told the king he would do, Abdul Latif decided to visit British India to meet Mirza Ghulam Ahmad. He publicly announced his allegiance to the Ahmadiyya movement, offering Bay'ah to Mirza Ghulam Ahmad in Qadian.

When the news spread that Abdul Latif was a follower of the new Ahmadiyya Movement in Islam, Habibullah Khan, on the order of religious clerics, charged him with apostasy; at the time, this carried the death penalty in Afghanistan. On 14 July 1903, Abdul Latif was sentenced to death after it was learned that he was mentally fit and that he willingly became a follower of the Ahmadiyya movement. It is believed that he did not surrender his beliefs for the Afghan government, although he was asked multiple times that if he denied Mirza Ghulam Ahmad, he would not be executed. The Afghan government carried on with his execution.

The Ahmadiyya Muslim Community claim that he was buried half underground and stoned to death, which was the common form of execution at the time. According to the Ahmadiyya Movement in Islam, he is the first recognized martyr for its cause. Mirza Ghulam Ahmad has written books on him and his stoning. It is reported that a total of about three Ahmadiyya Muslims executions were carried out in Kabul between 1901 and 1924.

== See also ==
- Ahmadiyya in Afghanistan
- Persecution of Ahmadiyya
- Sahibzada Abdul Qayyum
- Durand line
- FATA
- Khyber Pakhtunkhwa
