= Khatme Nubuwwat Academy =

Khatm-e-Nubuwwat Academy (English:Finality of Prophethood Academy) is an Anti-Ahmadiyya organisation located in Forest Gate, London, United Kingdom. The organization describes itself as leading an awareness campaign against "Qadiani propaganda", a derogatory term often used for Ahmadi Muslims. The academy also studies, and publishes on theological concepts such as Khatam an-Nabuwwah, or Seal of the Prophets which in its opinion describes Muhammad as the absolute last of the Islamic prophets. The organization is loosely affiliated with similar organizations around the world, particularly with those in Pakistan.

== Criticism ==
In 2010, The Independent reported that the Khatme Nubuwwat Academy was inciting division between Ahmadis and Muslims.

At the time, the website belonging to the Academy described Ahmadis as nothing but a gang of traitors, apostates and infidels. With reference to this, Akber Choudhry, a spokesman for the Academy said

The words 'apostates' and 'infidels' are understood differently in English than in their Islamic theological sense, especially within the Urdu-speaking Muslims, and can be replaced by terms more sensitive to the current climate in which the connotations of these words have changed quite rapidly in the past few years.

In 2018 an article in the New Statesman stated that "A cursory look at the website of the ‘Khatme Nubuwwat Academy’ displays the following language used to describe Ahmadi Muslims: "kafir" – a term that is intimidating with hostile connotations. The site also lists a quote allegedly taken from the poet Allama Muhammad Iqbal, stating, "Ahmadis are traitors both to Islam and to India."

=== In the media ===
After The Independent article, BBC and Channel 4 also picked up the story and alleged that pamphlets advocating the killing of Ahmadis had been distributed in South London.

The Crown Prosecution Service decided that no crime had been committed and no charges were brought. An Ahmadiyya spokesperson said that a judicial review was being considered and Lord Avebury asked for an inquiry into the CPS decision. However, no judicial review or inquiry occurred. Avebury remarked that the threshold for prosecution was too high and questioned why only one case had been filed since the law came into being.

== See also ==
- Ummah Channel
- Ordinance XX, a Pakistani law restricting the practice of Islam and the religious freedom of Ahmadis
