= Ummah Channel =

British Islamic television channel

- Country: United Kingdom
- Broadcast area: Studio
- Headquarters: Blackburn

Programming
- Languages: Urdu, English

History
- Launched: 12 August 2009
- Replaced: 9X
- Closed: 31 July 2017

Links
- Website: http://www.ummahchannel.tv/

Ummah Channel was an Islamic television channel based in the United Kingdom. It launched in August 2009 by replacing 9X's former Sky EPG slot on Sky Digital. It was closed down at the end of 31 July 2017 and is no longer broadcasting.

== Channels ==
=== Maria TV ===
Maria TV launched on 19 July 2012 on the first day of Ramadan. The channel’s name comes from Maria al-Qibtiyya, an enslaved Coptic Christian from Egypt who became one of the wives of Muhammad. According to Islam Ahmed Abdallah, Chief Executive of Ummah TV, says the name represents "transferring from slavery to freedom, from Christianity to Islam". Maria TV’s staff includes 30 volunteers and a few dozen women who work there occasionally. The channel features only women who wear the niqab, including those who work behind the camera. Men are not allowed to work for the channel or call into its shows.

Maria TV aired for six hours of programming on Ummah TV, which showed only fully veiled women. Guests who choose not to wear the Niqab had their features blurred out.

== Criticism ==
In 2010, in the wake of the May 2010 attacks on two Ahmadiyya Mosques in Lahore, Pakistan, members of the Ahmadiyya Muslim Community living in the UK were threatened and intimidated. In October 2010 Ofcom criticised the UK-based Ummah Channel for broadcasting three interactive television programmes before and after the Lahore massacre on Ahmadis in May 2010, in which religious leaders and callers alike said that Ahmadis should be killed. These programmes were repeated several times. Ofcom stated that the programme's abusive treatment of the religious views and beliefs of members of the Ahmadiyya Muslim community breached UK broadcasting regulations.

In September 2012, Ahmed Abdallah, the owner of Maria TV, and his son and the channel's chief executive, Islam, were arrested for burning a copy of the Bible during a protest outside the U.S. Embassy in Cairo.

== Closure ==
The channel closed on 31 July 2017 after apparent financial difficulty. Ummah Channel failed to attract an audience wider than its usual Barelvi Sect (Islam).
