= Afghan Geodesy and Cartography Head Office =

Afghan government's national cartographic agency

The Afghan Geodesy and Cartography Head Office (AGCHO) is the Afghan government's national cartographic agency.

Founded in 1958, its focus is the production, publication and distribution of physical, topographical, political, thematic, cadastral, and natural resources maps, helping Afghanistan's infrastructural development, economical projects and security organisation.

Reporting directly to the President, AGCHO has approximately 700 staff and regional offices in 16 provinces.
