= Ghulam Ali Okarvi =

Ghulam Ali Okarvi غلام علی اوکاڑوی
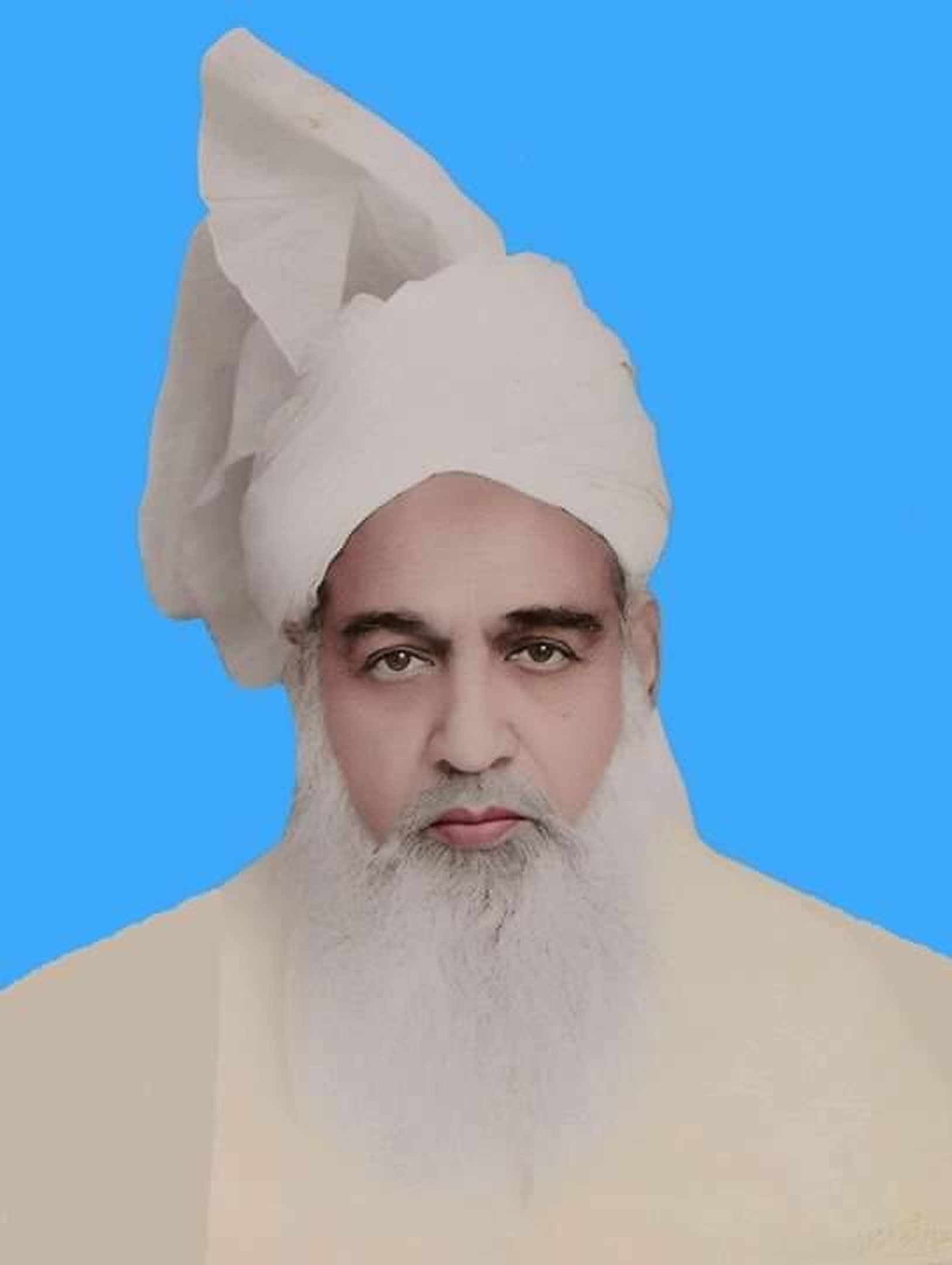
- Title: Shaikh ul Quran

Personal life
- Born: 11 June 1919 Gujrat, Punjab, British India
- Died: 16 May 2000 (aged 80) [OKARA], Punjab, Pakistan
- Era: Modern era
- Region: South Asia
- Main interest(s): Tafseer, Hadith, Fiqh, Aqeedah, Linguistics, Tasawwuf

Religious life
- Religion: Islam
- Denomination: Sunni
- Jurisprudence: Hanafi
- Creed: Maturidi

Muslim leader
- Influenced by: Abul Barakat Ahmad, Naeem-ud-Deen Muradabadi.
- Influenced: Muhammad Shafee Okarvi, Pir Muhammad Inayat Ahmad Naqshbndi Ganj e Inayat, Kaukab Noorani Okarvi ...

Ghulam Ali Okarvi (Punjabi, Urdu: غلام علی اوکاڑوی; 11 June 1919 CE or 20 Ramadan 1337 AH – 16 May 2000 CE or 11 Safar 1421 AH) was an Islamic scholar, orator, jurist, muhadis, mufasir, and linguist from Pakistan. He taught the Quran and Hadith for more than 50 years.

== Biography ==
Ghulam Ali was born in the small village of Babanian near Lalamusa, Gujrat in British India. His ancestors were founders of the village. Around five to six generations before his birth, they arrived from Srinagar and named the village Babanian.

Okarvi's primary education was at Govt. Model Primary School in the neighbouring village Umar Chak and middle-level education at Middle School Jora Karnana in the neighbouring village Jora Karnana. He started his early Persian language education at Umer Chak.

For higher education, he formally studied in Jamia Arabia Karimia Hanfia (branch of Anjuman Hizbul Ahnaf, Lahore) in Jalandhar, India and Hizbul Ahnaf, Lahore. Furthermore, he was greatly influenced by different scholars of his era, including Naeem ud Deen Muradabadi, Ahmed Yaar Khan Naeemi, Abul Hasanat Qadri, Syed Muhammad Ashrafi, etc.

He studied in Lahore with Abul Barakat Syed Ahmad Qadri from Hizb ul Ahnaf who gave him the title "Shaikh ul-Quran", later adopted by others.

Okarvi died on Tuesday 11 June 2000 CE (11 Safar 1421h) at the age of 80 in Jinnah Hospital, Lahore. He was buried on land he owned in Ashraf ul Madaris, GT Road, Okara.

== Activities ==
He took part in the Pakistan Movement on the platform of All India Sunni Conference.

In 1948, he was one of the founding members of Jamiat Ulema-e-Pakistan. Later on, he continued his struggle for the implementation of Islamic Constitution in the country. After on he actively participated in the Movements of Khatme Nabuwat and Nizam e Mustafa in the Country.

In 1964, he, along with other scholars, declared that to assign the office of the Head of the State to a female is "un-Islamic and Haram," and "destructive" for the country and the nation.

In 1969, after the Ayub Khan era, he gathered JUP splits in Lahore and united them to take part in the election. His party was the third largest party in West Pakistan during the 1970 election. He remained its Punjab Chapter's President in 1970s. In 1977, he was also the Punjab President of Pakistan National Alliance.

=== Disciples ===
- Muhammad Shafee Okarvi.
- Pir Muhammad Inayat Ahmad Naqshbndi (Hazoor Ganj e Inayat Sarkar)
- Pir Sabir Shah, Former Chief Minister of KPK.
- Kaukab Noorani Okarvi
