= Okarvi =

Okarvi is an Urdu surname signifying association with the city of Okara, Pakistan. Notable people with this surname include:

- Ghulam Ali Okarvi, Pakistani religious scholar
- Kaukab Noorani Okarvi (born 1957), Pakistani religious scholar
- Muhammad Shafee Okarvi (1930–1984), Pakistani religious scholar

== See also ==
- Okara (disambiguation)
