= Tafsir Noor ul-Irfan =

- Front cover (Naeemi Kutub Khana edition)
- Author: Mufti Ahmed Yar Khan Naeemi
- Language: Urdu
- Genre: Tafsir (Quranic Exegesis)
- Publisher: Naeemi Kutub Khana, Lahore
- Publication date: 1957
- Media type: Print (Hardback)
- Pages: 1,057

Tafsir Noor ul-Irfan, fully titled Hashiya al-Quran Noor ul-Irfan ala Kanz ul-Iman, is a concise Quranic commentary in Urdu written by the prominent Islamic scholar Mufti Ahmed Yar Khan Naeemi.

== Characteristics ==
Despite its brevity, it is highly comprehensive, presenting, in a simple and effective manner, literal explanations of Qur’anic verses, grammatical points, occasions of revelation, juristic issues, sufi interpretations, contemporary issues and key lessons.

He is described by his biographers as a prominent scholar of his time. That's why, this exegesis contains scholarly insights, where the author presents rational arguments for those inclined toward intellectual reasoning and Qur’an and hadith-based examples for the general Muslim audience.

== Sample excerpts ==
Even a look at the explanation of the opening verses of the Holy Quran shows how wide-ranging and detailed this tafsir is. The following excerpts illustrate the thematic approach of the work.

When Prophet Sulayman, peace be upon him, wrote a letter to Queen Bilqis, he began it with bismillah. By its blessing, he was granted the kingdom of Yemen along with the Queen of Yemen (p. 2).

At the time of slaughter, one should only say “Bismillah, Allahu Akbar,” because in an act of severity, the mention of divine mercy is not made. For this reason, the name of the Holy Prophet, peace and blessings be upon him, is not mentioned at slaughter (p. 2).

Among all the blessings of the Lord, the greatest blessing is guidance to the straight path, for which supplication is made in every rak‘ah (p. 2).

The sign of the straight path is that it is the path of the awliya’ (friends of Allah) and the righteous, for they are the recipients of divine favor (p. 2).

After the Holy Qur’an, there is neither any prophet nor any heavenly book, because it confirms previous revelations and does not give glad tidings of any future revelation. Confirmation relates to the past, while glad tidings concern the future (p. 9).

The best preacher is one whose actions preach more than his words, such that people become righteous merely by observing him (p. 9).

Upon the Children of Israel, the entire Torah was revealed at once, and all commandments were imposed suddenly. When they hesitated to accept it, Mount Tur was raised over them with the warning: accept it or it will fall. The gradual revelation of the Holy Qur’an is a mercy, enabling ease in practicing its commands (p. 12).

Divine recognition and fear of Allah are found even in stones, and recognition and love of the Holy Prophet, peace and blessings be upon him, exist even in wood and stones. The Holy Prophet, peace and blessings be upon him, said: "Mount Uhud loves us and we love it" (Bukhari, 3/150, Hadith 4422). From this it is understood that the Holy Prophet, peace and blessings be upon him, is aware even of what is in the hearts of stones; thus, how could he not know what is in the hearts of humans. And the heart that lacks love for him is worse than a stone (p. 14).

Showing reluctance in describing the qualities of the Holy Prophet, peace and blessings be upon him, or preventing others from doing so, is the way of the Jews (p. 14).

The absence of help on the Day of Judgment applies to the disbelievers; Allah will appoint many helpers for the believers (p. 16).

== Popularity ==
This exegesis, due to its simplicity, accessibility to the general public, clarity, and concise yet comprehensive style, attained widespread acceptance and popularity. In 1957, upon writing it, a prominent organization of leading scholars of the country—comprising distinguished ‘ulema who supported the Pakistan Movement—conferred upon Mufti Ahmad Yar Khan Naeemi the title of Hakim al-Ummat. Accordingly, one of the biographers of Mufti Ahmad Yar Khan, Shaykh Bilal Ahmad Siddiqi, writes:

The title Hakim al-Ummat was unanimously proposed in 1957 by the leading scholars of Pakistan, at the initiative of Pir Sayyid Masoom Shah Naushahi Qadiri, proprietor of Noori Kutub Khana, Lahore, upon the writing of the marginal commentary on the Holy Quran. The Sunni scholars of India also endorsed this title, and it was printed for the first time on the cover of his marginal commentary on the Holy Qur’an titled Noor al-‘Irfan. The names of those scholars who conferred the title Hakim al-Ummat are as follows:

- Sayyid Masoom Shah Naushahi
- Sayyid Abu al-Kamal Barq Naushahi
- Shaykh al-Hadith Abdul Ghafoor Hazarvi
- Shaykh al-Hadith Mawlana Sardar Ahmad Qadri
- Sayyid Ahmad Saeed Kazmi Shah
- Sayyid Muhammad Husayn Shah, son of Sayyid Jamaat Ali Shah Muhaddith Alipuri (Hyderabad, Deccan, Pakistan)
- Hazrat Babu Ji, Golra Sharif
- Qari Ahmad Husayn Rehtaki, Khateeb-e-Azam Eidgah, Gujrat
- The sons of Sadr al-Afazil Sayyid Naeem al-Din Muradabadi

His works are described in biographical sources as having gained wide acceptance.

The author was blessed with visiting the Haramain Sharifain seven times. On one occasion, after performing Hajj, he spent a long period in the serene and spiritually radiant atmosphere of Madinah al-Munawwarah. During this time, a desire arose in his heart to remain permanently in that sacred land.

According to his biographers, the author was inspired to write the commentary after a spiritual experience in Madina.

His other major (though incomplete) work is Tafsir Naeemi, which reaches 11 volumes and provides a much more expansive academic discourse than the concise Noor ul-Irfan.
