= Jamaat Ali Shah =

Religious leader (1834-1951)

Ameer-e-Millat, Sayyid Pir Syed Jamaat Ali Shah Sherazi Muhaddis
- پیر جماعت علی شاہ شیرازی
- Title: Pir Sherazi

Personal life
- Born: 1834 Alipur Sharif, Sialkot, (present-day Narowal, Punjab, Pakistan)
- Died: 1951 (aged 116–117)

Religious life
- Religion: Islam
- Denomination: Sunni
- Jurisprudence: Hanafi
- Tariqa: Naqshbandi
- Creed: Maturidi
- Movement: Barelvi

Muslim leader
- Post: President, All India Sunni Conference
- Period in office: British India

Pir Syed Jamaat Ali Shah (1834 – 1951) was a Pakistani author, Islamic scholar and Sufi saint of the Naqshbandi Order. He presided over the All India Sunni Conference and led the Movement for Shaheed Ganj Mosque. He was a contemporary of Ahmed Raza Khan Barelvi, the founder of Barelvi movement.

He was among the scholars who led the anti-Ahmadiyya movement. He was a leader of the Pakistan Movement. He gave personal donations to Anjuman Hizbul Ahnaf, a Madrasa founded by Syed Deedar Ali Shah Alwari to propagate the true Islam to the people.

== Family background ==
He was born in 1834 in a Sayyid family and his father was Sayyid Karim Shah. His ancestors came to India with Mughal Emperor Humayun and settled in Alipur, Sialkot when Akbar started his new religion, Din-i Ilahi.

== Socio-political and religious services ==
Jama'at Ali Shah completed his religious studies in jurisprudence and especially in the sciences of hadith. He laid the foundation stones and funded hundreds of mosques throughout the Subcontinent. He was a central figure in the Khilafat Movement and worked against Arya Samaj's Shuddhi movement. He opposed the rise of Qadianism and Wahhabism.

He refused to pray behind the official Salafi Wahabi Imams in Mecca and Medina appointed by King Saud, and he would not obey an order to visit the King. He explained: "I am a faqeer, he is a king". Saud relented and allowed him to pray by himself. He established the Anjuman Khuddamus Sufia, Hind. in March 1901, he published the monthly Anwarus Sufia from Lahore.

He was associated with Anjuman-i-Himayat-i-Islam, Lahore, Anjuman Hizbul Ahnaf, Lahore, Anjuman Nomania, Lahore, Anjuman Islamia Amritsar, Aligarh Muslim University, Aligarh, Anjuman Khuddamus Sufia Hind, Anjuman Khuddamul Muslimeen, Kasur, Anjuman Ta’limul Qur’an Lahore, Madrasa Saulatia Makkah Mukarramah, Madrasa Naqshbandia Mysore, All India Sunni Conference, Anjuman Islamia, Sialkot, and Central Muslim Association Bangalore.

=== Leadership in Lahore's Shaheed Ganj Mosque Movement ===
He was a leader in the Shaheed Ganj Mosque movement, which opposed British rule in Lahore. He presided over the first session of the Conference to organize protests. He was appointed the Chief and "Shaheedganj Day" occurred on 20 September 1935 under his leadership.

His appointment as leader of this movement garnered support from other Sufi scholars. Fazal Shah of Jalalpur and Ghulam Mohiuddin of Golra Sharif, from Multan, Zainulabedin Shah of the Gilani family and Anjuman Hizb-ul-Ahnaf from Lahore offered support to Shah's leadership. This consensus created a religious and political base which reduced urban-rural differences. The struggle continued for several years.

=== Leadership of the All India Sunni Conference ===
Between 16 and 19 March 1925, three hundred Sunni scholars met at Jamia Naeemia Moradabad and established Jamiyyat-e-Aliyah-al Markaziah, commonly known as All India Sunni Conference (AISC).

In the first meet from 16 to 19 March 1925, Shah supported the anti-Hindu and anti-Jamiat Ulema-e-Hind stance for Sunni ulemas.

Shah was elected its president with Naeem-ud-Deen Muradabadi as General Secretary.

The inaugural session discussed political and social transformation, extremist Hindu movements Shuddhi, the unstable political situation of Muslims, the Khilafat movement, and the possibility of migration. The definition of Sunni was given and policies of Deobandi organisation Jamiat-Ulem-a-Hind and Congress were criticized.

Shah gave the keynote address. He spoke against Wahhabism and in favour of Islamic unity and cohesion.

At the following All India Sunni Conference, held in Badaun during October 1935, he was declared Ameer-e-Millat or leader of Muslim community. In his address, he highlighted the need for unity among the Muslim scholars and common Muslims Ummah. He condemned the Ibn Saud’s policies in Arabia, and demanded to maintain the honor of the Holy and sacred places of the Muslims.

The Third All India Sunni Conference which was held on 27–30 April 1946 at Benaras was attended by five hundred Mashaikh, seven hundred ulema and around two lac people under his president-ship. In this session leaders supported the demand for Pakistan and vowed to make every sacrifice for the establishment of an Islamic government. When some nationalist Ulema criticized the Jinnah. Pir Jamat Ali Shah took his defense by saying. " Think of Jinnah Sahib whatever you like, but I say that Jinnah Sahib is Waliullah.

=== Participation in Pakistan movement and Aligarh Movement ===
Shah supported the Aligarh Movement and contributed funds to it.

Shah toured throughout the country to get the support of Muslim League and Pakistan. After the passage of Lahore Resolution he supported Mohammad Ali Jinnah’s vision for Pakistan. He told his followers to join and work for the League and declared that he would not lead funeral prayers unless his followers supported the Pakistan Movement. His election campaign in 1945 and 1946 resulted in the success of Muslim League candidates. He also visited the North-West Frontier Province during the referendum of 1947 to strengthen support for the Muslim League.

== Relationship with Jinnah ==
He supported the Pakistan movement and was admired by Muhammad Iqbal, the poet. He wrote many letters to Jinnah, offering advice and support. He gave prayer beads and a prayer mat to Jinnah to encourage him to follow Islamic practices.

He served in rehabilitating the refugees and launched the Nifaz-i-Shariat Movement in new country.

== Books ==
Relevant works include:

=== By him ===
- Malfūẓāt-i Amīrulmillat : ʻAlá ḥaz̤rat Pīr Sayyid Jamāʻat ʻAlī Shāh Muḥaddis ʻAlīpūrī, teachings.
- Amīr-i Millat aur Āl Inḍiā Sunnī Conference, speeches delivered at various Sunni Muslim conferences held in India during 1925–1946, supporting the Pakistan Movement.
- Z̤arūrat-i Murshid : Irshādāt, Islamic views on the need for a spiritual head of a religious order.

=== About him ===
- Fidāyān-i Amīr Millat by Muḥammad Ṣādiq Qaṣūrī, biographical sketches of some noted disciples of Jamāʻat ʻAlī Shāh.
- 'Makātib-i Amīr-i Millat by Muḥammad Ṣādiq Qaṣūri, correspondence of some disciples.
- Iqbāl aur Amīr millat by Muḥammad Ṣādiq Qaṣūrī, relations with poet-philosopher Muhammad Iqbal.
- Sīrat-i pāk Ḥaz̤rat Pīr Sayyid Jamāʻat ʻAlī Shāh Lās̲ānī by Sayyid Irtiz̤á ʻAlī Kirmānī and K̲h̲ālid Yūsuf ʻAbīdī, a biographical study.

== Recognition ==
He received award from the Sultan of Ottoman Turkey for his assistance to the people of Medina during a drought and the title "Abu'l Arab" was bestowed upon him. He was authorized to accept Murids into many Sufi orders but he worked in Naqshbandi order of Sufism and It is estimated that he had over 1 million Murids (disciples) worldwide. Sayyid Afdal Husayn Shah is the successor in Jamaat Ali's lineage and serves on Naqshbandiya Foundation for Islamic Education's Advisory Council.

Muhammad Ali Jinnah stated that:

It is my firm belief that Pakistan will definitely come into being, because Ameer-e-Millat (Jamaat Ali Shah) has assured me that this will certainly happen. I have absolutely no doubt that Ameer-e-Millat’s words will come true with the grace of Almighty Allah.

Allama Iqbal paid his tribute in his words:

Obeisance and paying homage to Hazrat Ameer-e-Millat is a sure token of good fortune.

In his collection of poetry, “Zarb-e-Kaleem,” Allama Iqbal has composed the following stanza, entitled “Mard-e-buzurg”: Just like the candle burning at a gathering, he is distinctive but at the same time everybody’s companion. He resembles the morning sun in spreading splendour of inspiration.

== Legacy ==
His grandson Pir Syed Munawar Hussain Shah Jamaati is manager of his Dargah and Sajjad Nasheen of Astana-i-Alia Alipur Sayyedan. The death anniversary of Syed Jamaat Ali Shah is observed regularly in Pakistan and in the United Kingdom.

== Death ==
He died in 1951 at Alipur, Narowal, Pakistan where his tomb is situated.

== See also ==
- Maulana Abdul Hamid Qadri Badayuni
- Ahmed Raza Khan
- Sufism
