= Syed Muzaffar Hussain (Lok Sabha member) =

Indian politician

MP Syed Muzaffar Hussain

Members of the 7th Lok Sabha
- In office 1980–1984
- President: Neelam Sanjiva Reddy; Giani Zail Singh
- Prime Minister: Indira Gandhi; Rajiv Gandhi

Members of the 3rd Lok Sabha
- In office 1962–1967
- President: Sarvepalli Radhakrishnan
- Prime Minister: Jawaharlal Nehru; Lal Bahadur Shastri; Indira Gandhi

Personal details
- Born: Uttar Pradesh, India
- Party: Indian National Congress
- Spouse: Mohammadun Nisa Bibi
- Children: 5

Syed Muzaffar Hussain Kichauchvi was an Indian poet, politician, agriculturist and Islamic scholar belonging to the Barelvi movement of Sunni Islam. He had served as a member of the 3rd and 7th Lok Sabha. A member of the Indian National Congress, he represented Bahraich parliamentary constituency in 1962 and 1980. He was a moderator of Jamaat Raza-e-Mustafa.

He was vice-president of All India Muslim Personal Law Board.

== Early life and education ==
He was born in October 1919 to Syed Ashraf Husain, brother of Ali Hussain Ashrafi in Ashrafpur Kichhauchha, Faizabad district, Uttar Pradesh. He received his education from Ashrafpur Madrasa and later went Jamia Naeemia, Moradabad for Arabic, Urdu and Persian education under Naeemuddin Moradabadi.

=== Ba’it and Khilafat ===
He is a mureed and Khalifa of his father Syed Ashraf Hussain.

== Personal life ==
He was married to Mohammadun Nisa Bibi, with whom he had five children, including two daughters and three sons.

== Career ==
He was previously associated with Republican Party of India. In 1954, he was appointed as secretary of All India Muslim Muttahada Mohaz, organizer of Republican Party of India for Uttar Pradesh unit in 1957. His last appointment was member of Committee on Petitions.
