= Jamia Nizamia Ghousia =

Islamic seminary in Wazirabad, Pakistan

- مرکز فیضان شیخ القرآن دارالعلوم جامعہ نظامیہ غوثیہ
- Type: Islamic university
- Established: 1935 C.E (1353 AH)
- Founder: Mohammad Abdul Ghafoor Hazarvi
- Affiliations: Tanzeem Ul Madaris Ahle Sunnat Pakistan
- President: Sahibzada Prof. Dr. Mohammad Asif Hazarvi
- Students: 400
- Location: Wazirabad, Punjab, Pakistan
- Campus: Urban

Darul Uloom Jamia Nizamia Ghousia (Urdu: دارالعلوم جامعہ نظامیہ غوثیہ) is an Islamic seminary for Sunni Muslims. It was established by Mohammad Abdul Ghafoor Hazarvi, where he served as the Mohatmim and Grand Mufti. His son Mufti Abdul Shakoor Hazarvi took over as Mohatmim until April 2010. The Jamia is known for the great Ulama and Huffaz of Quran and Hadith it produced. It continues the tradition of the Darul uloom system initiated by Darul Uloom Bareily.

== Academic disciplines ==
The Jamiah has the following division of studies:

- Nazirah-e-Qur'an (reading the Qur'an)
- Hifdhul-Qur'an (memorizing the Noble Qur'an)
- Tajweed and Qira’aat (Quranic Phonetics)
- Islamic Law
- Islamic Jurisprudence – Specialisation in the Science of Islamic Jurisprudence and Research (Mufti)
- Hadith
- Tafsir
- Dars-i Nizami
- Mantiq
- Islamic History
- Islamic Philosophy & Tasawwuf
- Arabic Language & Arabic Literature
- Persian Language & Persian Literature

The Darul Uloom has divided its education system into six major levels:

- First level — Urdu; Persian; Arabic; Nahu-Sarf; Seerah; Fiqh etc. are taught along with the History.
- Second level — Higher Arabic grammar; Fiqh; Mantiq (Logics).
- Higher Third level — higher Fiqh and Usul al-fiqh; higher Logic; higher Arabic Literature; higher Philosophy; higher Islam History.
- Fourth level — Hadith; Tafsir; Arabic and Persian poetry.
- Fifth level — Six major Hadith Books: Sahih al-Bukhari, Sahih Muslim, Sunan Abu Dawood, Jami` at-Tirmidhi, Al-Nasa'i and Sunan ibn Majah are mainly taught.
- Sixth level — further study in the field of Islamic Law; Arabic Language and Literature; Higher Hadith Study, Urdu Literature and Islamic Studies.

== Library and publications ==
- The Jamia Library has a large stock of valuable books of Islamic history, Islamic philosophy, textbooks of different levels, journals, magazines etc. in Arabic, Urdu, Persian and Punjabi languages. It has about 22,000 books.
- Fatwa-E-Jamia: The Madrasah has responsibilities for issues of society. It gives accurate advice and legal opinions for those issues the aggregate of which are published as a book called Fatwa-e-Jamiah.
- The Jamiah publishes monthly wallpapers on Arabic and national language.

== Facilities ==
All students reside at the madrasah. The Jamiah gives free education to all students and lends them textbooks. Students who attain an excellent result in the examination are rewarded. Moreover, the Jamiah provides 500 orphans and poor and distressed students with food and accommodation.

== Notable alumni ==
- Mufti Abdul Shakoor Hazarvi
- Pir Allauddin Siddiqui
- Moulana Asharaf Sialvi
- Moulana Muhammad Maqsood Chishti
- Sheikh Syed Abdul Qadir Jilani
- Muhammad Tufail Naqshbandi
- Muhammad Muneeb ur Rehman
- Sarfraz Ahmed Naeemi
- Sahibzada Haji Muhammad Fazal Karim

== See also ==
- List of Islamic educational institutions
- Al Jamiatul Ashrafia
- Manzar-e-Islam
- Al-Jame-atul-Islamia
- Jamiatur Raza
- Jamia Naeemia Lahore
- Jamia Al-Karam
- North Manchester Jamia Mosque
- Raza Academy
- Al-Mustafa Centre
- Manchester Central Mosque
