= Mohammad Abdul Ghafoor Hazarvi =

Indian Scholar (1909–1970)

Shaykh-ul-Quran حضرت شیخ القرآن Mohammad Abdul Ghafoor Hazarvi محمد عبدالغفور ہزاروی
- Title: Rahbar-e-Sharia, Qudwat ul-Salikeen, Zubdat ul-Arfeen, Burhan-ul-Wasleen, Makhdoom Ahle Sunnah, Hazrat Shaykh-ul-Quran, Abu al-Haqaiq

Personal life
- Born: 9 Dhu al-Hijjah 1326 Hijri 1 January 1909 Georgian calendar Chamba Pind, Kot Najeebullah, North-West Frontier Province, British India
- Died: 7 Sha'aban 1390 Hijri 9 October 1970 (aged 61)
- Resting place: Wazirabad, Punjab, Pakistan
- Era: Modern era
- Region: South Asia
- Main interest(s): Fiqh, Tafsir, Sunnah, Hadith, Sharia, ʿAqīdah, Seerah, Mantiq, Islamic philosophy, oratory, Tasawwuf
- Notable idea(s): Jamiat Ulema-e-Pakistan, Majlis-e-Tahaffuz-e-Khatme Nabuwwat
- Notable work(s): Jamia Nizamia Ghousia, Manaqib-al-Jaleela
- Education: Darul Uloom Bareily
- Occupation: Political leader, Grand Mufti

Religious life
- Religion: Islam
- Denomination: Sunni
- Jurisprudence: Hanafi
- Tariqa: Chishti, Qadiriyya, Uwaisi
- Creed: Sufism
- Movement: Barelvi

Muslim leader
- Disciple of: Hamid Raza Khan
- Influenced by: Abū Ḥanīfa, Abdul-Qadir Gilani, Ahmed Raza Khan Barelvi, Meher Ali Shah
- Awards: Nishan-e-Imtiaz (1958)

President of the Jamiat Ulema-e-Pakistan
- In office 19 September 1948 – 9 October 1970
- Preceded by: Office created
- Succeeded by: Abdul Hamid Qadri Badayuni

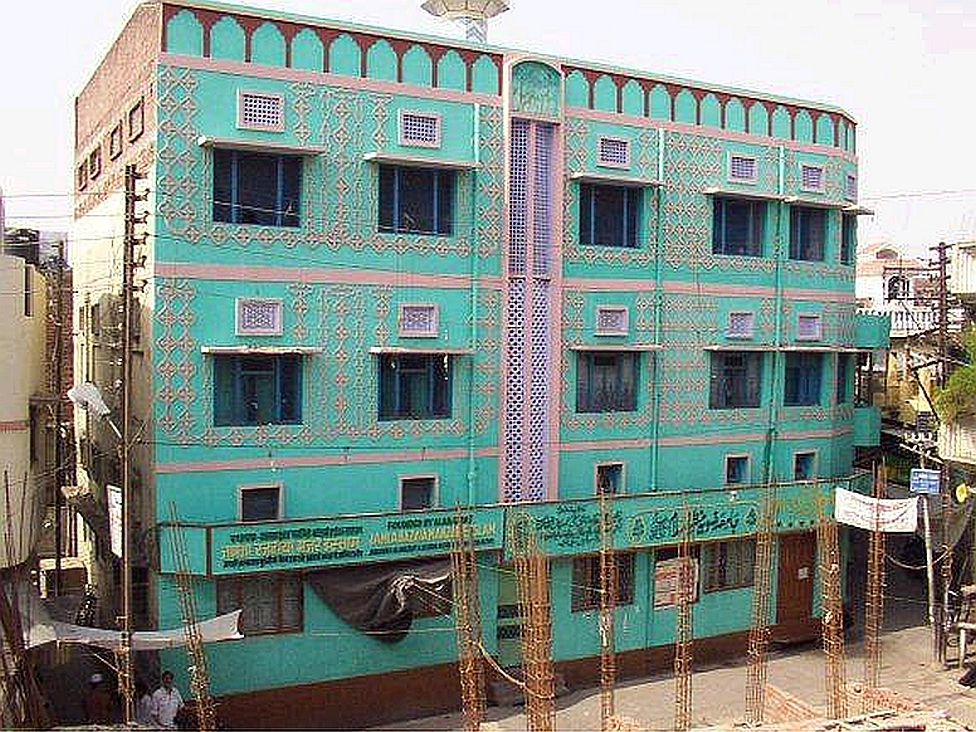
Manzar-e-Islam in Bareilly

Akhundzada Mohammad Abdul Ghafoor Hazarvi (Urdu: اخوندزادہ محمد عبدالغفور ہزاروی چشتی) (1 January 1909 – 9 October 1970) was a Muslim theologian, jurist, and scholar of ahadith in Pakistan (South Asia). As a politically active figure engaged in Pakistan's independence movement, he was the first recipient of Nishan-e-Imtiaz (Order of Excellence) by the President of Pakistan.

Hazarvi was active in the Pakistan movement and served as a member of Council of Islamic Ideology. He was the companion of Pakistan's founder Muhammad Ali Jinnah and Maulana Zafar Ali Khan and was active in the independence movement of Pakistan against the British Raj.

A Sufi of the Chishti Sufi order, he was the founding member of the religious Barelvi Sunni strain political party Jamiat Ulema-e-Pakistan (JUP) and became its president in 1948. He was also the chairman of Majlis-e-Tahaffuz-e-Khatme Nabuwwat, an organisation opposed to the Ahmadiyya Movement that waged a campaign against Mirza Ghulam Ahmed's claim of prophethood.

== Early life ==
Hazarvi was born in Chamba Village, Kot Najeebullah, North-West Frontier Province, British India. His father Abdul Hameed Hazarvi, an Islamic scholar, belonged to the Hazarewal Karlal tribe. He was a follower of the Chishti Order. He was the elder of his four brothers and sisters. He started studies of Islamic law, Urdu, Persian and Arabic languages at the local maktab in Chamba Village, Hazarvi studied from scholars including Muhib-un-Nabi. He was the student of Mushtaq Ahmad Kanpuri, where he learned Islamic Jurisprudence and traditional Dars-i-Nizami. He completed the Dawra Hadith and Qur'anic exegesis with Hamid Raza Khan the elder son of Ahmad Raza Khan in Madrasa Manzar-e-Islam, Bareily. Hamid Raza Khan gave this student of his khilafat, which is why Qadri is written on his gravestone. Hazarvi was attracted to mathematics, and studied the fundamental concepts in mathematics in depth.

== Pledge of allegiance and services ==
Hazarvi pledged allegiance to Meher Ali Shah at the age of 11 and asked him to pray that he could become a scholar. Pir Meher Ali Shah said to him that "jaao! eik din tum bohot barei moulvi bano gei" (Mawlawi was the title used for Alim in those days).

At the age of 28, in 1937 Abdul Ghafoor Hazarvi went to Jeendhar Sharif, Gujrat, at the service of Uwais-e-Waqat Khawaja Gohar Munir Jeendharvi which was a great Sufi of the Uwaisi order, who devoted everything to his followers, due to this immense fayz (blessing), Hazarvi progressed rapidly through the stages of spiritual training and Tasawwuf. He conferred khilafah upon Hazarvi thus giving him permission to speak on behalf of the Uwaisi Order.

After taking the education he started the teaching Quran and Hadith in Madrasa Manzar-e-Islam in Bareilly, India. After then he taught Dars-i-Nizami in Jamia Khudam-ul-Sufiya in Gujrat, where he performed his duties as Mudarris. On (1935), Hazarvi established Jamia Nizamia Ghousia in Wazirabad, where he served as the Mohatmim and Khatib. Hazarvi was a great Mudarris and in the month of Ramadan especially he would teach Dowra Qur'an to advanced students over the 30 days.

Some people viewed Abdul Ghafoor Hazarvi as a talented speaker, noting his ability to answer and reply spontaneously. Many people would go "Mast" when he delivered his speeches. Ghazali-e-Zaman Syed Ahmad Saeed Kazmi Shah would consider himself uneducated in front of him. Hazarvi shared a close relationship with Muhaddith-e-Azam Pakistan Moulana Sardar Ahmad Qadri; both had studied under Hamid Raza Khan.

Hazarvi was involved with the Jamiat Ulema-e-Pakistan (JUP), Anjuman-e-Talaba-e-Islam (ATI), Majlis-e-Tahaffuz-e-Khatme Nabuwwat and All India Majlis-e-Ittehad-e-Millat which later on merged in All-India Muslim League in 1940.

== Muslim League & Patriotism ==
Hazarvi was one of the provincial delegates to the Lahore Resolution of the All India Muslim League session in which he participated on 22–24 March 1940. During the Pakistan Movement, Hazarvi was among the scholars who sided with Muhammad Ali Jinnah and the Muslim League, on the platform of "All India Sunni Conference″ held at Banaras in 1946. When Pakistan movement began for the independence of India, the Indian National Congress was supported by many Muslim scholars, leaders and the learned who were devotees of Indian nationality and stood side by side with the Hindu leaders. Abdul Ghafoor Hazarvi announced his assistance and loyalty to Qa’id A‘zam in the struggle to acquire Pakistan. After the passage of Lahore Resolution he gave an all out support to the Mohammad Ali Jinnah for the achievement of Pakistan. He made intensive tours of the country to generate support for the AIML. He advised his followers to work for the AIML and emphatically declared that he would not lead the funeral prayers of any devotee if he had not participated in the Pakistan Movement in any capacity. He was twice nominated as a member of the Council of Islamic Ideology, where he worked hard to Islamicize the existing laws. Abdul Ghafoor Hazarvi supported AIML during the elections 1945–46. His sincere campaign in the election of 1945–46 resulted in grand success of AIML candidates. During referendum in 1947 in NWFP he also visited the province and mustered his support for AIML.

In the Indo-Pakistani War of 1965, Abdul Ghafoor Hazarvi donated all the ornaments of his family to the Pakistan Army. He was twice nominated as a member of the Council of Islamic Ideology, where he worked hard to Islamicize the existing laws.

== Agitation for democracy ==
During the Ayub era, nine prominent leaders belonging to different political parties were tried for mutiny under the Official Secret Act. The nine of them had decided to initiate a democratic movement; As a president of Jamiat Ulema-e-Pakistan Abdul Ghafoor Hazarvi was one of the nine. The trial lingered on for two years. Ultimately, the case was taken back by the government, for lack of evidence. In 1965, the joint opposition was organised, he was one of its central leaders. Along with other leaders of the Combined Opposition Party (COP), Hazarvi toured the two wings of the country (East and West Pakistan) to create mass awareness and organise a strong national democratic movement. The military ruler, president Muhammad Ayub Khan (1958–1969), banned political parties and warned Hazarvi against continued political activism. Jamiat Ulema-e-Pakistan supported the opposition party, the Pakistan Democratic Movement (PDM). In the 1964–1965 presidential elections, Hazarvi supported the opposition leader, Fatima Jinnah.

== Opposition to other sects ==
Mirza Ghulam Ahmad of Qadian claimed to be the Mahdi (messiah) awaited by Muslims, as well as a Ummati Nabi, a subordinate prophet to Muhammed who brings no new Sharia but instead restores Islam to its pure form. These claims proved controversial among many Muslims, and Hazarvi branded Mirza Ghulam Ahmad as a heretic and apostate and called him and his followers (Ahmadis) Kuffar. Hazarvi was also the founding member of Majlis-e-Tahaffuz-e-Khatme Nabuwwat, Pakistani nationalist Muslim political movement in Pakistan. He led a movement against Ahmadis and held a Khatme Nabuwwat Conference at Rabwah in 21–23 October 1953. Abdul Ghafoor Hazarvi was a central figure in the Khatme Nabuwwat Movement of 1953, which demanded that government of Pakistan declare the Ahmadis as non-Muslims. Hazarvi was active in the Khatme Nabuwwat movement.

== Beliefs and Practices ==
=== Beliefs regarding Muhammad ===
Hazarvi believed that:

- Muhammad is a human being but created from light like angels, rather than from clay like other human beings.
- He is present in many places at the same time.
- He is still witnessing all that goes on in the world.
- He has knowledge of that which is unknown, including the future.
- He has the authority to do whatever he desires as granted to him by God.
- Although human, he possessed a nūr (light) that predates creation. This contrasts with the Deobandi view that Muhammad was insan-e-kamil ("the complete man"), a respected but physically typical human.
- He is haazir naazir (can be present in many places at the same time, as opposed to God, who is everywhere by definition).
- God has granted him ilm-e-ghaib (the knowledge of the unseen).

Hazarvi wrote:

We do not hold that anyone can equal the knowledge of Allah Most High, or possess it independently, nor do we assert that Allah's giving of knowledge to the Prophet (Allah bless him and give him peace) is anything but a part. But what a patent and tremendous difference between one part [the Prophet's] and another [anyone else's]: like the difference between the sky and the earth, or rather even greater and more immense.

— Hazarvi, Shamsul Hidayah (c00), 291.

=== Practices ===
- Public celebration of Muhammad's birthday.
- Veneration of the dead, specifically those who lead pious/righteous lives. This consists of the intervention of an ascending, linked and unbroken chain of holy personages claimed to reach ultimately to Muhammad, who Barelvis believe intercede on their behalf with God.
- Visiting the tombs of Muhammad, his companions and of pious Muslims, an act the Barelvis claim is supported by the Quran, Sunnah and acts of the companions, but which opponents call "shrine-worshipping" and Grave worshiping and consider to be un-Islamic.
- Use of devotional music.
- Leaving the beard to grow for men; the Hazarvis views a man who trims his beard to less than a fist-length as a sinner, and shaving the beard is considered abominable.

== Works ==
Hazarvi wrote and translated books on a variety of subjects, including his compilation of Manaqib-al-Jaleela, is a book on Islamic Jurisprudence.

Other works include:

- Tahqiq-ul-Haq Fi Kalima-tul-Haq (The Truth about Kalima-tul-Haq)
- Shamsul Hidayah
- I'la Kalimatillah Fi Bayan-e-Wa Ma Uhilla Bihi Legharillah
- AlFatuhat-us-Samadiyyah (Divine Bounties)
- Tasfiah Mabain Sunni Wa Shi'ah
- Majmua Fatawa

== Ideology ==
Hazarvi's understanding of Islamic law has been presented concisely in his book Manaqib-al-Jaleela. Hazarvi's inspiration from his mentor, Ahmed Raza Khan Barelvi and non-traditionalist approach to the religion has parted him from traditionalist understanding on a number of issues, but he never goes out of the traditional framework.

=== Jihad ===
Hazarvi believes that there are certain directives of the Qur'an pertaining to war which were specific only to Muhammad and certain specified peoples of his times (particularly the progeny of Abraham: the Ishmaelites, the Israelites, and the Nazarites). Thus, Muhammad and his designated followers waged a war against Divinely specified peoples of their time (the polytheists and the Israelites and Nazarites of Arabia and some other Jews, Christians, et al.) as a form of Divine punishment and asked the polytheists of Arabia for submission to Islam as a condition for exoneration and the others for jizya and submission to the political authority of the Muslims for exemption from death punishment and for military protection as the dhimmis of the Muslims. Therefore, after Muhammad and his companions, there is no concept in Islam obliging Muslims to wage war for propagation or implementation of Islam. The only valid basis for jihad through arms is to end oppression when all other measures have failed. According to him Jihad can only be waged by an organised Islamic state. No person, party or group can take arms into their hands (for the purpose of waging Jihad) under any circumstances. Another corollary, in his opinion, is that death punishment for apostasy was also specifically for the recipients of the same Divine punishment during Muhammad's times—for they had persistently denied the truth of Muhammad's mission even after it had been made conclusively evident to them by God through Muhammad.

The formation of an Islamic state is not a religious obligation per se upon the Muslims. However, he believes that if and when Muslims form a state of their own, Islam does impose certain religious obligations on its rulers as establishment of the institution of salat (obligatory prayer), zakah (mandatory charity), and 'amr bi'l-ma'ruf wa nahi 'ani'l-munkar (preservation and promotion of society's good conventions and customs and eradication of social vices; this, in Hazarvi's opinion, should be done in modern times through courts, police, etc. in accordance with the law of the land which, as the government itself, must be based on the opinion of the majority).

The Qur'an states norms for male-female interaction in surah An-Nur. While in surah Al-Ahzab, there are special directives for wives of Muhammad and directives given to Muslim women to distinguish themselves when they were being harassed in Medina. The Qur'an has created a distinction between men and women only to maintain family relations and relationships.

=== Penal laws ===
- The Islamic punishments of hudud (lit. "limit" or "boundary") are maximum pronouncements that can be mitigated by a court of law on the basis of extenuating circumstances.
- The shariah (Divine law) does not stipulate any fixed amount for the diyya (monetary compensation for unintentional murder); the determination of the amount—for the unintentional murder of a man or a woman—has been left to the conventions of society.
- Ceteris paribus (all other things being equal), a woman's testimony is equal to that of a man's.
- Rape is hirabah and deserves severe punishments as mentioned in the Quran 5:33. It doesn't require four witnesses to register the case as in the case of Zina (Arabic) (consensual sex). Those who were punished by stoning (rajm) in Muhammad's time were also punished under hirabah for raping, sexually assaulting women, and spreading vulgarity in society through prostitution.

=== Sources of Islam ===
- All that is Islam is constituted by the Qur'an and Sunnah. Nothing besides these two is Islam or can be regarded as its part.
- Just like Quran, Sunnah (the way of the prophet) is only what Muslim nation received through ijma (consensus of companions of the prophet) and tawatur (perpetual adherence of Muslim nation).
- Unlike Quran and Sunnah, ahadith only explain and elucidate what is contained in these two sources and also describe the exemplary way in which Muhammad followed Islam.
- The Sharia is distinguished from fiqh, the latter being collections of interpretations and applications of the Sharia by Muslim jurists. Fiqh is characterised as a human exercise, and therefore subject to human weakness and differences of opinion. A Muslim is not obliged to adhere to a school of fiqh.

== Death ==
Hazarvi died on 9 October 1970, in a road accident at Wazirabad, Punjab, Pakistan. He left 2 sons and 4 daughters elder son name was Mufti Abdul Shakoor Hazarvi and second son is Muhammad Tariq Hazarvi.

== See also ==
- Ahmed Raza Khan Barelvi
- Lahore Resolution
- All India Sunni Conference
- Tehreek-e-Labaik
- Pir Syed Muhammad Channan Shah Nuri
- Jamiat Ulema-e-Pakistan
- Majlis-e-Tahaffuz-e-Khatme Nabuwwat
- Sunni Ittehad Council
- Jamia Nizamia Ghousia
- Pir Syed Faiz-ul Hassan Shah
- Manaqib-al-Jaleela
- Ahmed Raza Khan Barelvi
- Hamid Raza Khan
- Meher Ali Shah
- Maulana Zafar Ali Khan
- Barelvi
- Anjuman-e-Talaba-e-Islam
- Karlal
- Nishan-e-Imtiaz
