= Tafsir Naeemi =

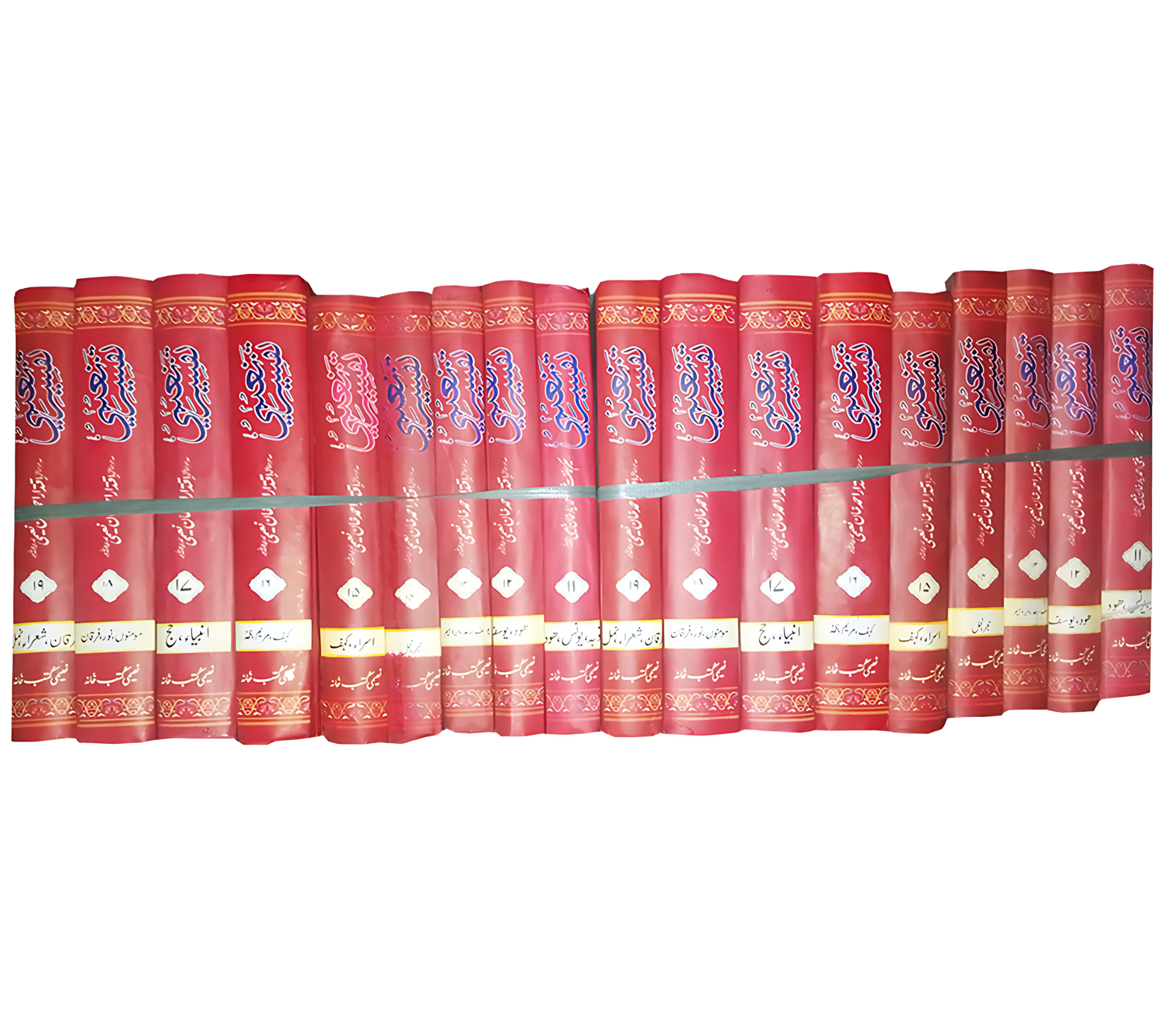
- Set, Naeemi Kutub Khana, Lahore, 2009
- Author: Mufti Ahmad Yar Khan Naeemi
- Original title: تفسیر نعیمی
- Language: Urdu
- Genre: Tafsir
- Publisher: Naeemi Kutub Khana, Lahore
- Publication date: 1944 (Vol. 1) – 1971 (Vol. 11)
- Media type: Hardcover print (11 Volumes)
- Pages: 6,787

Tafsir Naeemi (Urdu: تفسیر نعیمی), originally titled Ashraf al-Tafasir (1363 AH/1944 CE), is a comprehensive tafsir (exegesis of the Quran) in Urdu by Mufti Ahmad Yar Khan Naeemi (1906–1971). It consists of 11 volumes, each covering one juz (section) of the Quran. The work incorporates material from classical Sunni tafsirs such as Tafsir al-Kabir, Tafsir Ruh al-Bayan, Tafsir al-Baydawi, Tafsir al-Jalalayn, Tafsir al-Khazin and others. Its distinctive feature is that under each Qur'anic verse, the following eleven points are included in detail, which are generally not found in other Urdu tafsirs:

1. The Arabic text of the verse
2. A literal translation
3. An idiomatic translation
4. The connection (ta‘alluq) of each verse to preceding verses
5. Occasions of revelation (asbab al-nuzul)
6. Detailed scholarly commentary
7. A summary of the interpretation
8. Extracted lessons
9. Jurisprudential (fiqh) rulings
10. Responses to objections and criticisms
11. A mystical (sufi) commentary

This multi-layered approach made the work accessible to scholars, jurists, sufis, preachers and lay readers alike. The author continued writing until his death in 1971, completing commentary on the first eleven parts.

== Style and methodology ==
The books is characterized by:

- Extensive use of classical Arabic tafsirs, with quotations and comparative interpretations.
- Explanations of multiple possible meanings of a single phrase; for example:

Number of interpretations	Verse (Arabic)	Volume & Page
9 interpretations	وَ اَنْزَلْنَاۤ اِلَیْكَ الْكِتٰبَ بِالْحَقِّ	Vol. 6, p. 465
7 interpretations	وَ لَا تَقْتُلُوْۤا اَنْفُسَكُم	Vol. 5, p. 35
10 interpretations	یٰۤاَیُّهَا الَّذِیْنَ اٰمَنُوْا	Vol. 5, p. 478

- Lexical and semantic distinctions between near-synonyms:

Words distinguished	Volume & Page
muwaddat (affection), mahabbah (love) and khullah (intimate friendship)	Vol. 5, p. 430
darak (depth) and darajah (rank)	Vol. 5, p. 509
khatm (concealment), ikhfa (hiding) and sir (secret)	Vol. 5, p. 73

- Use of analogies and parables to explain complex concepts.
- Frequent inclusion of Arabic, Persian and Urdu poetry (including the author’s own verses under his pen-name Salik).
- Engagement with objections from various religious and sectarian perspectives (Hindus, Christians, rationalists, etc.), providing counter-arguments in a structured manner:

Topic	Volume & Page
objections on faith and guidance	Vol. 1, p. 153
objections on intercession	Vol. 1, p. 366
objections on abrogation (naskh)	Vol. 1, p. 621
objections on fasting	Vol. 2, p. 213

== Sources ==
The tafsir draws upon classical Sunni works, including:

- Tafsir al-Baydawi
- Tafsir al-Jalalayn
- Tafsir al-Khazin
- Tafsir Ruh al-Bayan
- Tafsir Ruh al-Ma‘ani
- Tafsir al-Kabir
- Tafsir al-Madarik
- Tafsir Ibn Arabi
- Tafsir Jumal
- Tafsir al-Sawi
- Tafsir Azizi
- Tafsīrāt al-Ahmadiyyah (by Allamah Ahmad Jiwan)

== History ==
=== Writing ===
The writing of Tafsir Naeemi was completed over a period of twenty-eight years (1363–1391 AH / 1944–1971 CE). Mufti Ahmad Yar Khan Naeemi began with Volume 1 in 1363 AH (1944 CE) and concluded with Volumes 10 and 11 in 1391 AH (1971 CE).

Vol.	Juz’ (Part)	Year (AH)	Year (CE)
1	1	1363	1944
2	2	1364	1945
3	3	1365	1946
4	4	1381	1961
5	5	1383	1963
6	6	1386	1966
7	7	1387	1967
8	8	1388	1968
9	9	1390	1970
10	10	1391	1971
11	11	1391	1971

=== Publication (year 2009 edition) ===
Many editions of Tafsir Naeemi have been published in different cities across the world over the years. The table below provides the details of one such edition, the 2009 publication by Naeemi Kutub Khanah at Lahore.

Vol.	Pub. date	Pages
1	2009	701
2	ND	582
3	2009	630
4	ND	650
5	2010	616
6	2012	646
7	ND	673
8	2009	592
9	2009	561
10	2014	568
11	2011	568

== Reception ==
The tafsir is widely referenced in Urdu scholarship. Contemporary scholars have praised its blend of traditional exegesis with accessible explanations. It continues to be cited in religious seminaries and among Sunni scholars of South Asia.

== Bibliography ==
=== Primary sources ===
- 1971: Qazi Abdul Nabi Kokab, Hayat-e-Salik, Maktaba Islamia, Gujrat (Pakistan). [Publication date not specified, but the preface mentions 1391 AH/1971 CE].
- 2004: Sheikh Bilal Ahmad Siddiqui, Life of Hakim al-Ummat Mufti Ahmad Yar Khan Naeemi Badayuni, Naeemi Kutub Khana, Gujrat (Pakistan).
- 2012: Mufti Iqtidar Ahmad Khan, Tafsir Naeemi: Volume 15, Preface, Naeemi Kutub Khana, Lahore.

=== Secondary sources ===
- Muhammad Shoaib Attari, "Features of Tafsir Naeemi (Vol. 1)", al-Tafsir, Karachi, Vol. 8, Issue 23, Jan–Jun 2014, pp. 169–192.
- Maulana Muhammad Naveed Kamal Madani, Wise Examples from Tafsir Naeemi: A Collection of 1,409 Rational Analogies Used in Tafsir Naeemi, Maktaba A‘la, Lahore, 1439 AH/2018 CE.
- Shafqat Ali, "A Research Study of Tafsir Naeemi’s Style and Methodology", Mirrat al-Arifeen International, May 2020.
- Dr. Mahmood Ahmad, Dr. Muhammad Ziaullah, and Muhammad Amjad Rizvi, "Insights into Qur’anic Secrets and Spiritual Understanding: A Study of Tafsir Naeemi (Vol. 9)", al-Mahdi Research Journal, Vol. 5, Issue 2, Oct–Dec 2023, pp. 507–524.
- Mufti Ata-ur-Rehman, Dr. Hafiz Muhammad Mudassir Shafiq, and Asma Asghar, "A Critical Study of the Mystical Style in Selected Narratives of Surah al-Baqarah (in light of Tafsir Naeemi)", Jahan-e-Tahqeeq, Vol. 6, Issue 4, Mar 2023.
- Dr. Hafiz Muhammad Mudassir Shafiq, Durr Nayab Haider, and Maryam Bibi, "A Critical Study of the Mystical Style in the Narratives of Mary and Zechariah in Surah Al-Imran (Tafsir Naeemi)", Jahan-e-Tahqeeq, Vol. 7, Issue 1, Mar 2024.
- Ali Muhammad, Dr. Muhammad Naveed, and Dr. Muhammad Ansar, "Mufti Ahmad Yar Khan Naeemi’s Rational Approach in Mystical Discourses", al-Hameed Islamic Studies Research Journal, Vol. 3, Issue 1, 2024, Lahore. ISSN: 2959-1767, 259-1759.
- Muhammad Shoaib, Dr. Hafiz Muhammad Mudassir Shafiq, and Hafiz Muhammad Anas, "Mystical Style in Selected Narratives of Surah Al-Imran (Tafsir Naeemi)", al-Idhaat Research Journal, Vol. 4, Issue 1, Jan–Mar 2024.
- Mufti Ata-ur-Rehman, Dr. Hafiz Muhammad Mudassir Shafiq, and Dr. Shah Nawaz, "A Critical Study of the Mystical Style in the Story of Moses and Bani Israel (Tafsir Naeemi)", al-Hameed (Academic and Research Journal), Vol. 3, Issue 1, Mar 2024.
- Mufti Ata-ur-Rehman, Dr. Hafiz Muhammad Mudassir Shafiq, and Dr. Farhan Akhtar, "A Critical Study of the Mystical Interpretation of the Story of Ibrahim in Surah al-Baqarah (Tafsir Naeemi)", al-Manhal Research Journal, Vol. 4, Issue 1, Jan–Mar 2024.
- Mufti Ata-ur-Rehman, Dr. Hafiz Muhammad Mudassir Shafiq, and Dr. Farhan Akhtar, "A Critical Study of the Mystical Style in the Story of Adam and Iblis in Surah al-Baqarah (Tafsir Naeemi)", al-Mahdi Research Journal, Vol. 5, Issue 2, Jan–Mar 2024, pp. 178–190.
- Sajid Mahmood Abid, "Hakim al-Ummat Mufti Ahmad Yar Khan Naeemi and His Contribution to Tafsir", Bahauddin Zakariya University, Multan.
- Faisal Munir, "Mufti Ahmad Yar Khan Naeemi’s Scholarly Contributions", Imperial College of Business Studies, Lahore.
- Muhammad Irfan, "Mufti Ahmad Yar Khan Naeemi’s Methodology of Tafsir with Reference to Sufism", Bahauddin Zakariya University, Multan.

== See also ==
- Tafsir
- List of tafsir works
