= Ahmad Yar Khan Naeemi =

Islamic scholar and writer

Mufti Ahmad Yaar Khan Naeemi

Personal life
- Born: March 1, 1894; 4 Jamadi ul-Ula 1324 Budaun, United Provinces of Agra and Oudh, British India (present-day Budaun, Uttar Pradesh, India)
- Died: October 24, 1971 (aged 77); 3 Ramadan 1391 Gujrat, Pakistan
- Resting place: Gujrat, Pakistan; 32.577072°N 74.081815°E
- Children: Mufti Mukhtar Ahmad Khan; Mufti Iqtadar Ahmad Khan
- Notable work(s): Aik Islam; Ameer Muawiyah Radi-Allah-Anhu par Aik Nazar; Asrar al-Ahkam; Diwan-e-Salik; Fatawa Naeemiya; Ilm al-Miras; Ilm al-Quran; Islam ki Chaar Usooli Istilahain; Islami Zindagi; Ja al-Haq; Mirat al-Manajih (8 Volumes); Naeem al-Bari fi Inshirah al-Bukhari; Rehmat Khuda ba-Waseela Awliya Allah; Risalah Noor; Safar Namay; Shaan Habib ur-Rahman; Saltanat e Mustafa; Tafsir Naeemi (11 Volumes); Tafsir Noor ul-Irfan
- Education: Madrasa Shamsul Uloom, Budaun
- Relatives: Father: Mawlana Muhammad Yar Khan ibn Munawwar Khan

Religious life
- Religion: Sunni Islam
- Denomination: Sunni
- Jurisprudence: Hanafi
- Tariqa: Qadri
- Creed: Maturidi
- Movement: Barelvi

Mufti Ahmed Yaar Khan Naeemi was a Sunni Islamic scholar, commentator, jurist, and Sufi from the Indian subcontinent. He was honored with the title Hakim al-Ummat (Wise Leader of the Nation). He is well known for his theological contributions and his magnum opus, Tafsir Naeemi, which is a comprehensive exegesis of the Holy Quran.

== Early life and education ==
He was born in the month of Shawwal in the year 1894, to Muhammad Yaar Khan in the district of Budaun, Uttar Pradesh, India.

He began his education under the guidance of his father until the age of 10. His life was marked by a deep engagement with Islamic education, which laid the foundation for his future contributions to Islamic scholarship. After completing his education, he remained in India for some time, where he was involved in teaching, issuing fatwas (Islamic legal opinions), and writing. His scholarly pursuits were not confined to one place; he later moved to Pakistan, dedicating his life to serving Islam through various scholarly activities. Naeemi's educational journey equipped him with the knowledge and skills that would later influence his extensive writings and theological discussions. His works, particularly in the form of fatwas and his exegesis of the Quran, reflect a profound understanding of Islamic jurisprudence and theology, which he acquired through his rigorous education and scholarly endeavors.

== Life ==
He is a testament to his dedication to Islamic scholarship and spirituality. He then pursued advanced studies in Islamic jurisprudence, theology, and philosophy, which laid the foundation for his future contributions. In 1916, he attended Madrasa Shamsul Uloom in Budaun, where he studied until 1919. His quest for knowledge took him to Moradabad, where he delved deeper into Islamic sciences under the tutelage of Maulana Qader Bakhsh Budauni. It was during this period that he met Imam Ahmed Raza Khan Barelvi, a meeting that would have a profound impact on his intellectual and spiritual journey. After completing his studies at Jamia Naeemia Moradabad, he began teaching and writing, eventually moving to Pakistan.

There, he continued his scholarly work, which included issuing fatwas and writing his magnum opus, Tafsir Naeemi. His theological insights and interpretations in this exegesis are considered innovative within Sunni orthodoxy and continue to influence Islamic discourse today. Naeemi's life was marked by a relentless pursuit of knowledge and a deep commitment to serving the Islamic community. His legacy as a scholar, jurist, and Sufi is preserved through his extensive writings and the impact he had on Islamic thought and practice. His works, particularly Tafsir Naeemi, remain a valuable resource for scholars and students of Islam.

== Literary works ==
His literary contributions include a variety of works that have been influential in Islamic scholarship. These works reflect Naeemi's deep engagement with Islamic theology, jurisprudence, and spirituality. His writings continue to be studied and respected for their insights and contributions to Islamic thought. Some of his works are in alphabetical order:

- Aik Islam
- Ameer Muawiah radiy-Allāhu-anhu par ek nazar
- Deewaan-e-Saalik
- Haqeeqat-e-Nasab
- Ilm ul-Quran
- Ilm-ul-Miraṡ: It explains the Islamic laws of inheritance.
- Islam ki Chaar Usooli Istilaahen
- Islami Zindagi: A work that delves into the principles of living an Islamic life.
- Israr-ul-Ahkaam Ba Anwaar-ul-Qu’ran
- Ja al-Haq: It is a groundbreaking book, in which the beliefs, doctrines, and practices of Ahl al-Sunnah wa’l-Jamā‘ah are presented with strong scholarly and logical arguments.
- Mawaa’az Naeemiya
- Mirat ul-Manajih Sharah Mishkat ul-Masabih: It is the sharh of the famous hadith book Mishkat ul-Masabih in 8 Volumes.
- Naeem-ul-Bari Fee Inshirah al-Bukhari: It is a sharh of Sahih Bukhari.
- Rahmat-e-Khuda ba Waseela e Auliya Allāh
- Risala-e-Noor: A collection that includes various short stories, articles, and other writings.
- Safar Namay: A book that discusses astonishing events and situations in the Islamic context.
- Saltanat-e-Mustafa (sallallāhu alaihi wasallam) Dar Mamlikat e Kibriya
- Shaan-e-Habeeb-ur-Rahmān
- Tafsir Naeemi: This is his magnum opus, a comprehensive exegesis of the Holy Quran that spans multiple volumes.
- Tafsir Noor-ul-Irfan: It is a concise tafsir of the Holy Quran in one volume. Despite its brevity, it is highly comprehensive. It conveys the following in a simple and effective manner: explains phrase-by-phrase, and sometimes even word-by-word, brings in or refers to other relevant Quranic verses and hadiths, explains grammatical points, expounds occasions of revelation, presents juristic rulings, mentions spiritual insights, derives solutions to contemporary issues and important lessons and many more things.

== Teachers ==
He was influenced by several teachers and mentors who played a significant role in shaping his intellectual and spiritual development. Some of his teachers are as follows.

- Naeemuddin Muradabadi
- Qadir Bakhs Badayuni
- Mushtaq Ahmad Siddiqi Kanpuri
- Ahmad Hasan Kanpuri

== Legacy ==
His Tafsir Naeemi is among the most widely read commentaries on the Quran. He established Madrasa Ghausia Naeemia, where he dedicated himself to teaching until the end of his life. He was the follower and caliph of Syed Naeem-ud-din Qadri Moradabadi.

== Personal life ==
He had two sons:

- Mufti Mukhtar Ahmad Khan
- Mufti Iqtidar Ahmad Khan

== Death ==
He died on 3 Ramadan, 1391 AH, which corresponds to 24 October 1971. in the region of Gujrat, Pakistan, where his shrine is also located.

== Bibliography ==
=== Primary ===
- Mawlana Mehr Ali Shah, Al-Yawaqit al-Mihriyyah fi Sharh al-Thawrah al-Hadiyyah, Maktabat al-Mihriyyah: Chishtian, Bahawalnagar. [Date not printed, but 1384 AH / 1964 CE is mentioned in the "Muqaddimah".]
- Qazi Abd al-Nabi Kokab, Hayat-e-Salik, Maktaba Islamiyyah, Gujrat: Pakistan. [Not dated, but recorded as 1391 AH / 1971 CE in the preface "Arz-e-Awwal".]
- Shaykh Bilal Ahmad Siddiqi, Life of Hakim al-Ummat Mufti Ahmad Yar Khan Naeemi, Naeemi Kutub Khana, Gujrat: Pakistan, 2004.

=== Secondary ===
- Mawlana Mufti Abdul Hameed Naeemi, Hayat-e-Hakim al-Ummat, Naeemi Kutub Khana: Lahore, 2011.
- Al-Madinah al-‘Ilmiyyah, Faizan-e-Mufti Ahmad Yar Khan Naeemi, Maktaba al-Madina: Karachi, [2016].
- Mawlana Muhammad Naveed Kamal Madani, Wisdom-filled Examples from Tafsir Naeemi, Maktaba Aala Hazrat: Lahore, 1439 AH / 2018.
- Ali Muhammad, Dr. Muhammad Naveed, and Dr. Muhammad Ansar, Mufti Ahmad Yar Khan Naeemi's Rational Style in Sufi Discourse, Al-Hameed Islamic Studies Research Journal, Vol. 3, No. 1, 2024, Lahore. ISSN 2959-1767, 259-1759.
- Ansar Mahmood, Life and Services of Mufti Ahmad Yar Khan Naeemi, Minhaj University: Lahore.
- Faisal Munir, Literary Contributions of Mufti Ahmad Yar Khan Naeemi, Imperial College of Business Studies: Lahore.
- Sajid Mahmood Abid, Hakim al-Ummat Mufti Ahmad Yar Khan Naeemi and His Contributions in Tafsir, Bahauddin Zakariya University: Multan.
- Muhammad Irfan, Methodology of Tafsir by Mufti Ahmad Yar Khan Naeemi with Reference to Sufism, Bahauddin Zakariya University: Multan.
- Muhammad Afzal Qadri, Takhrij of Ja’ al-Haqq: Part One, Minhaj University: Lahore.
- Dilawar Hussain, Takhrij of Ja’ al-Haqq: Part Two, Minhaj University: Lahore.
