= Abdul Hamid Qadri Badayuni =

Pakistani Islamic scholar (1898–1970)

Personal life
- Born: Abdul Hamid Qadri; 11 November 1898 Badaun, Uttar Pradesh, India
- Died: 20 July 1970 (aged 71)
- Parent: Hakim Abdul Qayyum (father)
- Known for: Founder of Jamia-Talimat-e-Islamiya
- Other name: Mujahid-e-Millat
- Occupation: Islamic scholar, Sufi, poet, leader

Religious life
- Religion: Islam
- Denomination: Sunni
- Jurisprudence: Hanafi
- Tariqa: Chishti, Qadiri
- Movement: Barelvi

Abd al-Ḥāmid al-Qādirī al-Badāyūnī (Urdu: عبد الحامد قادری بدایونی; November 11, 1898 – July 20, 1970), also known as Mujahid-e-Millat, was a Pakistani Islamic scholar, Sufi, poet, and leader from Pakistan. He was the founder of the Islamic college Jamia-Talimat-e-Islamiya located in Karachi.

== Family background ==
Badayuni was born in Badaun, Uttar Pradesh on 11 November 1898. His father, Hakim Abdul Qayyum, died 20 days after he was born. His grandfather, Abdul Majid Qadri, was a Shaikh of Qadri Sufi Order. He received his religious education from his uncle Abdul Qadir, and studied Islamic Medicine in Delhi with Hakim Ajmal Khan. The scholars of Badayun were active in dissemination of their Aqidah in refutation of sects which they considered heretical.

== Education ==
Badayuni studied Islamic Sciences at Madrasa Qadriyyah and Madrasa Ilihia, Kanpur. He received ijazah in Silsila e Chishti (Sabria) and Qadriyyah from his Maulana Sheikh Muhammad Shafi Khawaja Nasir ud Deen Rampuri.

== Leader of community ==
In the Khilafat Movement, he was a member of the Central Khilafat Committee of Bombay. He took a stand against the Shuddhi movement, which was initiated by Hindu Arya Samajis to reconvert Indian Muslims to Hinduism. Abdul Hamid left the Indian National Congress and joined Markazi Tableeg al-Islam to oppose the Shuddhi Movement and actively worked to prevent the reversion of Muslims to Hinduism with Naeem-ud-Deen Muradabadi, Abdul Hafiz Qadri, Peer Jamaat Ali Shah and Syed Abu al-Hasanat Qadri.

== Association with Muslim League ==
He was a member of the All-India Muslim League Council beginning in 1937. He neutralized the influence of Pro-Congress Deobandi Scholar Hussain Ahmad Madani in Sylhet and Bengal in favor of the Muslim League. The resolution for the creation of Pakistan was adopted on March 23, 1940. He spoke in favor of the resolution at Minto Park, Lahore. At the All India Sunni Conference held at Banaras in 1946, Peer Jamaat Ali Shah declared Muhammad Ali Jinnah a Muslim and Maulana Abdul Hamid supported Syed Jamaat Ali Shah and spoke for more than 3 hours in support of Quaid-e-Azam & the Muslim League.

Badayuni went to Hijaz in 1946 under the leadership of Muhammad Abdul Aleem Siddiqi to request that the Saudi Government end the Hajj Tax and also to explain the mission of the Muslim League to create an independent Pakistan. He visited Haramain Sharifain 22 times and met many Muslim Leaders. He was a founding member of the Council of Islamic Ideology and also held the post of President of Jamiat Ulema-e-Pakistan, a body of the Barelvi movement in Pakistan. He was at the forefront of Majlis-e-Tahaffuz-e-Khatme Nabuwwat and was jailed for three months in Karachi. He believed that non-Muslims should not be made ministers in an Islamic nation. He raised the demand of making Pakistan an Islamic nation and view of Ulama should be given preference over secular law. He was on the forefront of persecuting the Ahmadiyyah and demanded that the Ahmadi should be declared non Muslim, and through All India Muslim league he demanded that Ahmadi should not be made members of the Muslim League.

== Death ==
Badayuni died in Karachi on 20 July 1970 (15 Jamadi-al-Aula 1390 Hijri) and was buried on the grounds of the Islamic College located on Manghopir Road. His janaza prayers were led (at his own wish before death) by his close friend and confidante, the great Sufi Shaikh and scholar, Maulana Syed Muhammad Mukhtar Ashraf al-Ashrafi al-Kachauchavi, aka Sarkar e Kalaan.

== Writings ==
Badayuni authored several influential works in Islamic doctrine, jurisprudence, and socio-religious movements. His writings include fatwa compilations, practical guides, and devotional poetry.

- جمِعِ فتاوی (Jamʿ al-Fatāwā, "Collection of Fatwas") – Published posthumously (Internet Archive edition dated 19 January 2022). This compilation includes legal verdicts issued by Badayuni on juristic matters and community issues, notably including a fatwa opposing restrictions on Hijaz pilgrimage sites (e.g. the Ka'bah and Green Dome).
- دعوتِ عمل (Da‘wat‑e‑Amal, "Call to Action") – A practical guide on spiritual and social duties combining Sufi piety with community activism, referenced in scholarly overviews of his intellectual contributions.
- Devotional poetry and prose – Authored various Urdu and Persian poems celebrating Sufi spirituality and the Prophet's status. Some of these are preserved in private manuscripts and Urdu journals.
- Political-religious treatises and pamphlets – Including works opposing the Ahmadiyya movement and supporting the protection of Khatm‑e‑Nabuwwat (Finality of Prophethood), distributed during Pakistan’s early decades.

These writings reflect Maulana Badayuni’s combined roles as jurist, Sufi, and political activist, reinforcing orthodox Sunni positions during formative periods of South Asian Islamic activism.

== See also ==
- Syed Faiz-ul Hassan Shah
- Peer Jamaat Ali Shah
- Barelvi movement
- Sufism

== Bibliography ==
- Tazkira Aabir Ahle Sunnat, Muhammad Abdul Hakim Sharaf Qadri
- Maulana Abdul Hamid Badayuni: Hayat aur Qaumi wa Milli Khidmat, Maulana Syed Muhammad Faruq Ahmad Qadri
- Hayat Mujahid-e-Millat, Dr. Nasiruddin Siddiqui
- Mujahid-e-Millat Maulana Abdul Hamid Badayuni RA ke Milli wa Siasi Khidmat, Zahooruddin Khan Amratsri
