= JRM =

JRM may refer to:

== Military ==
- Yugoslav Navy (Serbo-Croatian: Jugoslavenska ratna mornarica), a coastal defense force (1945–1992)
- Jewish Resistance Movement, a Zionist paramilitary alliance (1945–1946)
- Joint Region Marianas, a U.S. command on Guam (formed 2009)
- Martin JRM Mars, a U.S. Navy seaplane (in military use 1942–1956)
- Junior ranks’ mess, a dining an recreational space for personnel below the rank of sergeant in the British Army and Royal Air Force

== Other uses ==
- Jacob Rees-Mogg (born 1969), British Conservative politician
- Jama'at Raza-e-Mustafa, an Indian Islamic organisation (founded 1920)
- JR Motorsports, an American stock car racing team (debuted 2005)
