= Ashraf ul Madaris =

School of Islamic studies in Pakistan

Jamia Hanfia Dar ul Uloom Ashraf ul Madaris
- جامعہ حنفیہ دار العلوم اشرف المدارس
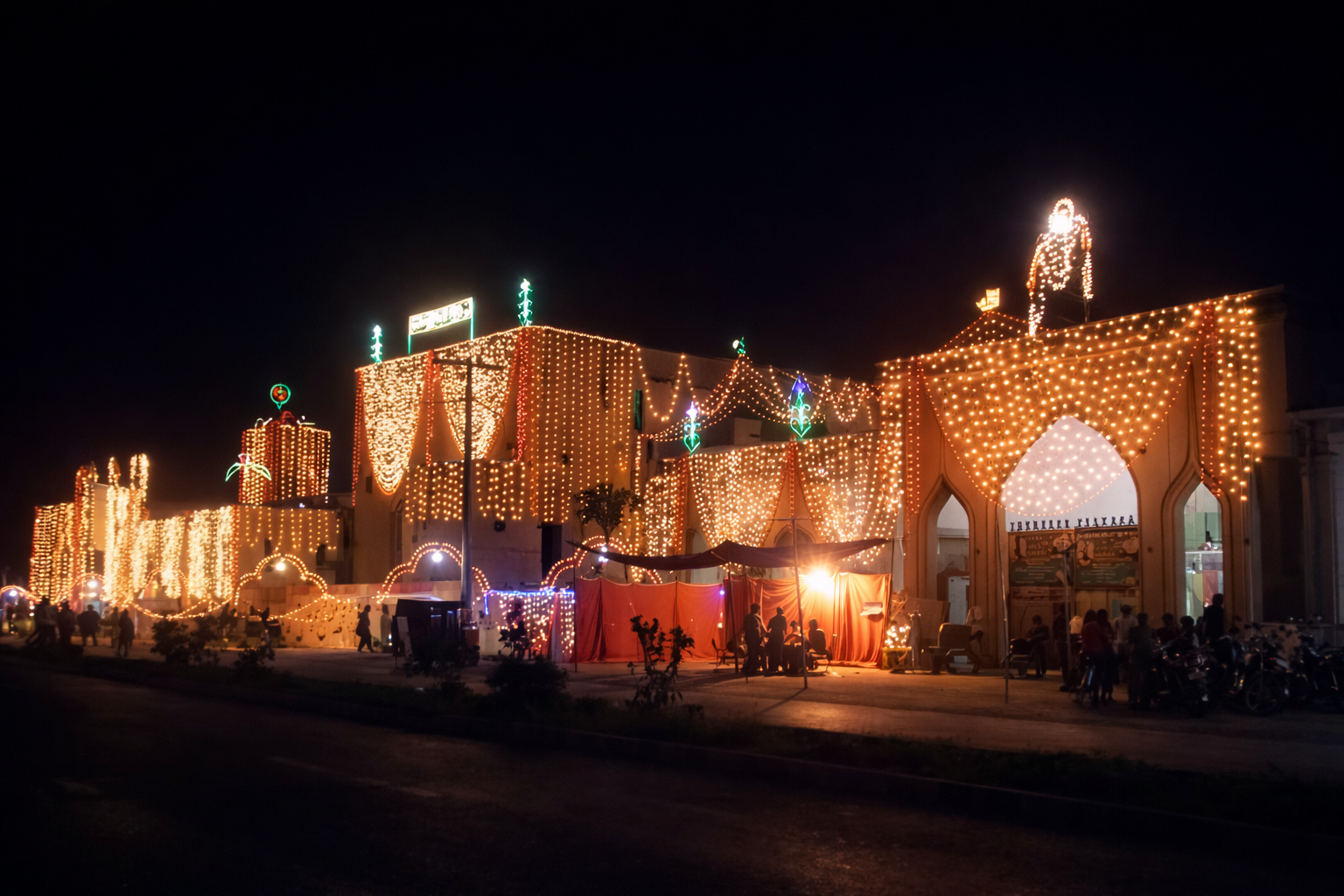
- Type: Islamic university
- Established: 1954 (1373 AH)
- Founder: Ghulam Ali Okarvi
- Affiliations: Tanzeem ul Madaris Ahle Sunnat
- Religious affiliation: Barelvi movement
- Academic affiliations: Tanzeem ul Madaris Ahle Sunnat
- President: Fazal ur Rehman Okarvi
- Head: Muhammad Hamza Okarvi
- Total staff: 50
- Students: 1000
- Location: GT Road, Okara, Punjab, Pakistan; 30°47′55.8″N 73°26′34.4″E
- Campus: Urban (1.2 acre)
- Website: ashrafulmadaris.com
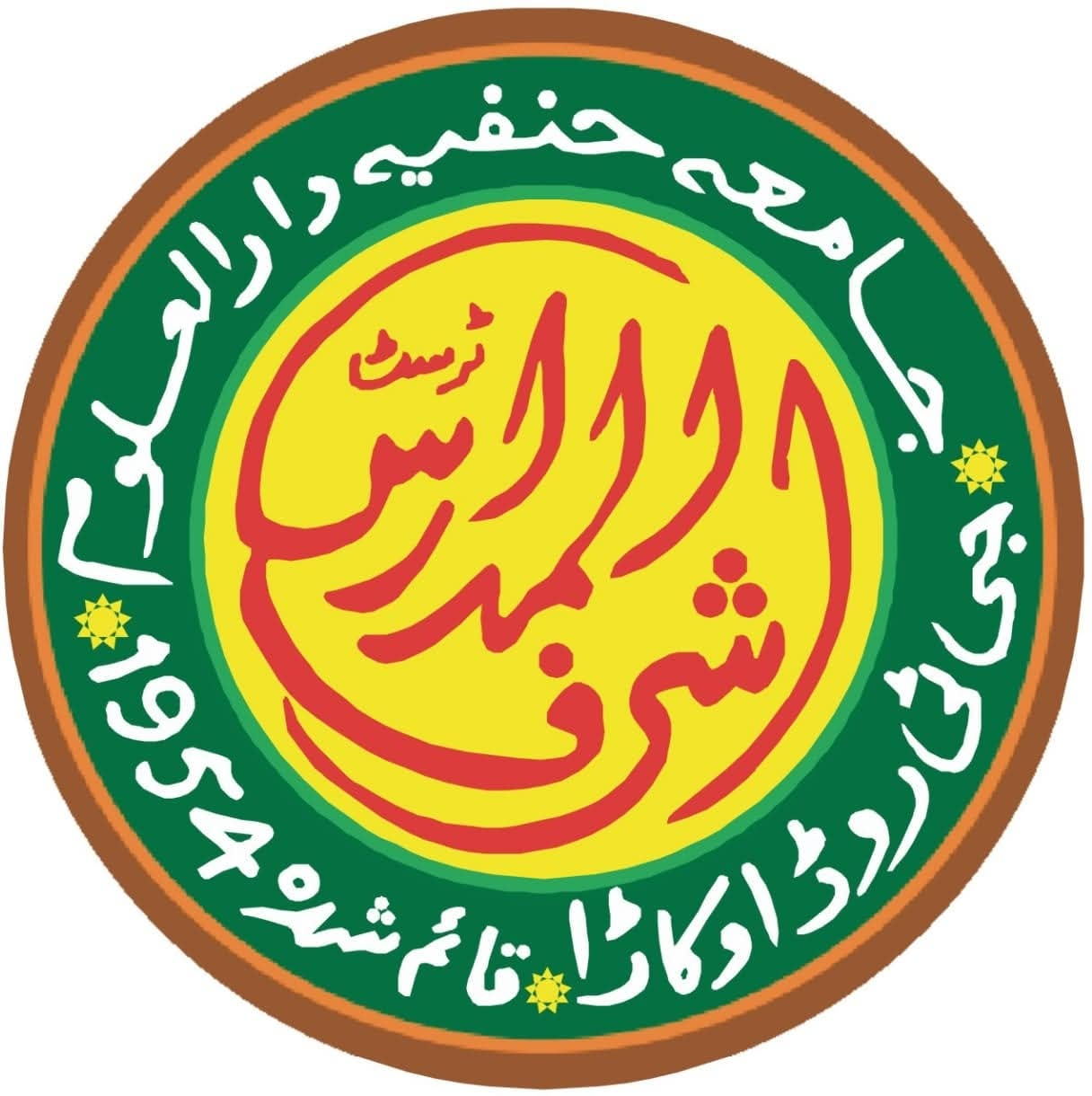

Ashraf ul Madaris (full name Urdu: جامعہ حنفیہ دار العلوم اشرف المدارس, romanized: Jamia Hanfia Darul Uloom Ashraf ul Madaris) is an Islamic institution for Islamic studies located in Okara, Punjab, Pakistan. It offers study from Matriculation level to master's degree. The school is affiliated with Tanzeem ul Madaris Ahle Sunnat Pakistan. whose degree is recognised by HEC equal to Master's. It is named after the 14th-century Sufi saint Ashraf Jahangir Semnani. It was founded in 1954 by scholar and orator Ghulam Ali Okarvi.

== History ==
Ashraf ul Madaris was established in 1954 by Islamic scholar Ghulam Ali Okarvi in Okara, Punjab. Since its establishment, the institution has been providing Islamic education and training to students from various regions of Pakistan.

== Affiliations ==
The institution is affiliated with Tanzeem ul Madaris Ahle Sunnat, a religious educational board in Pakistan responsible for curriculum and examinations of affiliated madaris.

== Departments ==
- Department of Hifz (Memorization of the Qur'an)
- Department of Tajweed (Correct pronunciation of Qur'an)
- Department of Dars e Nizami (Islamic Studies)
- Department of Ifta (Issuing Verdicts of Islamic Law)
- Department of Publication

== Alumni ==
- Muhammad Shafee Okarvi
- Kaukab Noorani Okarvi
