= Faiz Ahmad Owaisi =

Pakistani Islamic scholar (1932–2010)

Mufti Muhammad Faiz Ahmad Owaisi
- مفتی محمد فیض احمد اویسی

Personal life
- Born: 1932 (1351 AH) Hamidabad, Khanpur Tehsil, Rahim Yar Khan District, Punjab, British India
- Died: August 26, 2010 (aged 77–78) Bahawalpur, Punjab, Pakistan
- Known for: Founder of Jamia Owaisia Razvia
- Occupation: Islamic scholar, mufassir, muhaddith, author, translator, teacher

Religious life
- Religion: Islam
- Denomination: Sunni

Mufti Muhammad Faiz Ahmad Owaisi (1932–2010) was a Pakistani Sunni Islamic scholar, Quran commentator, hadith scholar, author, translator, Sufi, poet and teacher. He founded Jamia Owaisia Razvia in Bahawalpur and authored numerous works on Quranic exegesis, hadith, Islamic jurisprudence, theology and devotional literature.

== Early life ==
Mufti Muhammad Faiz Ahmad Owaisi was born in 1932 (1351 AH) in the village of Hamidabad, Khanpur Tehsil, Rahim Yar Khan District, Punjab, British India (now Pakistan). His father was Noor Ahmad Owaisi.

== Family ==
According to biographical accounts published by his followers, Owaisi belonged to the Lad community, which traditionally claims descent from Abbas ibn Abd al-Muttalib. His family was originally settled in Sindh before later migrating to the Rahim Yar Khan region.

== Education ==
Owaisi began his religious education under the supervision of his father, Noor Ahmad Owaisi. After completing elementary Quranic recitation, he attended primary school before devoting himself to memorizing the Quran, completing it between 1942 and 1946.

He subsequently studied Persian literature, completing texts including Karima, Pand Nama and portions of the Masnavi by 1947. He then enrolled in the traditional Dars Nizami curriculum, studying under Muhammad Nawaz Owaisi, Khurshid Ahmad and Muhammad Abdul Karim. He completed the curriculum in 1951.

In 1952, Owaisi undertook advanced studies in hadith under Maulana Sardar Ahmad of Faisalabad, from whom he received formal authorisation, ijazah, upon completing the Dawrah Hadith programme.Mufti Muhammad Faiz Ahmad Owaisi has also been covered by Pakistani media outlets. Dunya News Urdu published a profile/article discussing his religious and scholarly activities.

== Teaching career ==
After completing his studies, Owaisi returned to his native village of Hamidabad, where he established Madrasah Manba al-Fuyuz. The institution provided instruction in the traditional Islamic sciences and educated students from the surrounding region.

In 1963, he moved to Bahawalpur, where he established Jamia Owaisia Razvia and Jamia Masjid Sirani. The seminary offered instruction in Quran memorisation, the Dars Nizami curriculum, advanced hadith studies and Islamic legal studies, ifta. According to the institution, many scholars graduated from the seminary, which later developed a network of affiliated branches.

Owaisi also conducted specialised courses in Quranic exegesis, tafsir. Beginning in the early 1960s, he delivered tafsir programmes in numerous cities throughout Pakistan, including Bahawalpur, Khanpur, Khanewal, Faisalabad, Lahore, Gujranwala, Karachi, Hyderabad, Quetta, Khairpur, Dadu, Mianwali, Muridke and Kamoke. Institutional sources state that these programmes were conducted on more than seventy occasions and attended by several thousand students.

In addition to his teaching activities, Owaisi was known for delivering public lectures on the Quran and Sunnah throughout Pakistan and Azad Kashmir.

== Selected works ==
Owaisi began writing during his student years and continued throughout his life. According to biographical publications issued by his institution, he expressed the wish to remain engaged in writing until the end of his life. His writings primarily focus on Quranic exegesis, hadith studies, Islamic jurisprudence, theology, devotional literature and especially translations of classical Islamic texts. Institutional sources state that he authored more than 3,500 books, treatises, translations and pamphlets, while some later publications place the figure at over 4,000 works.

Owaisi authored numerous works on Quranic exegesis, hadith, Islamic jurisprudence, theology and religious literature. A selection of his published works includes:

=== Quranic studies and exegesis ===
- Bounties of the Most Merciful: Tafsir Fuyud al-Rahman (فیوض الرحمان), Urdu translation and brief commentary Tafsir Ruh al-Bayan, 12 volumes
- The Grace of the Benefactor: Commentary on Quranic Verses, Fadl al-Mannan fi Tafsir Ayat al-Qur'an (فضل المنان فی تفسیر آیات القرآن), Arabic, 10 volumes
- The Grace of the Quran: Commentary on the Quran, Tafsir Faiz al-Qur'an (تفسیر فیض القرآن), Urdu, 10 volumes
- Owaisi's Quranic Commentary: Tafsir Owaisi (تفسیر اویسی), 15 volumes
- The Blessings of the Prophet Regarding the Occasions of Revelation: Faiz al-Rasul fi Asbab al-Nuzul (فیض الرسول فی اسباب النزول), 10 volumes
- The Proof Regarding Chapters and the Quran, Al-Burhan fi al-Suwar wa al-Qur'an (البرہان فی السور والقرآن)

=== Hadith studies and commentaries ===
- The Flowing Blessing: Commentary on Sahih al-Bukhari, Al-Fayd al-Jari Sharh Sahih al-Bukhari (الفیض الجاری شرح صحیح بخاری), 10 volumes
- Commentary on Sahih Muslim, Sharh Sahih Muslim (ترجمہ و حاشیہ مسلم شریف), 10 volumes
- Commentary on Jami' al-Tirmidhi, Sharh Jami' al-Tirmidhi (ترجمہ و حاشیہ ترمذی شریف), 5 volumes
- Commentary on Sunan al-Darimi, Sharh Sunan al-Darimi (شرح دارمی), 8 volumes
- Commentary on Sunan al-Daraqutni, Sharh Sunan al-Daraqutni (شرح دار قطنی), 10 volumes
- Sunni Hadiths in the Razavi Legal Opinions, Al-Ahadith al-Sunniyyah fi al-Fatawa al-Razawiyyah (الاحادیث السنیہ فی الفتاویٰ الرضویہ), 5 volumes
- Fabricated Hadiths, Ahadith Mawdu'ah (احادیث موضوعہ), 5 volumes
- Abrogating and Abrogated Narrations in Hadith, Al-Nasikh wa al-Mansukh fi al-Ahadith (الناسخ والمنسوخ فی الاحادیث)

=== Islamic law and theology ===
- Owaisi Legal Opinions, Fatawa Owaisia (فتاویٰ اویسیہ), 10 volumes
- The Decision on Eight Issues, Faisla Hasht Mas'ala (فیصلہ ہشت مسئلہ), 10 volumes
- The Radiant Lights: Commentary on Mishkat al-Masabih, Al-Lama'at Sharh Mishkat al-Masabih (اللمعات شرح مشکوٰۃ), 5 volumes
- Commentary on al-Jami, Ni'am al-Hami Sharh al-Hami (نعم الحامی شرح جامی), 10 volumes
- The Two-Nation Theory and the Scholars of Ahl al-Sunnah, Do Qaumi Nazriya aur Ulama-e-Ahl-e-Sunnat (دو قومی نظریہ اور علمائے اہلسنت)
- The Difference Between Intrinsic and Bestowed Qualities, Zati wa Ata'i ka Farq (ذاتی و عطائی کا فرق)

=== Sufi and devotional literature ===
- Commentary on Gardens of Blessings, Sharh Hadaiq-e-Bakhshish (شرح حدائقِ بخشش), 25 volumes
- Commentary on the Masnavi of Mawlana Rumi, Sharh Masnavi Mawlana Rumi (شرح مثنوی مولانا روم), 25 volumes
- Owaisi Sermons, Mawa'iz Owaisia (مواعظِ اویسیہ), 10 volumes
- Owaisi's Begging Bowl / Collection of Writings, Kashkol Owaisi (کشکول اویسی), 10 volumes
- Owaisi Treatises, Rasa'il Owaisia (رسائل اویسیہ), 5 volumes
- Secrets and Devotion, Raz-o-Niaz (راز و نیاز), 5 volumes
- Owaisi Notebook, Bayaz Owaisi (بیاض اویسی), 5 volumes
- The Owaisi Chronicle, Owaisi Nama (اویسی نامہ), 5 volumes
- Biography of Khwaja Gharib Nawaz, Sawanih Khwaja Gharib Nawaz (سوانح خواجہ غریب نواز)
- The Pre-eternal Wine, Alasti Sharab (الستی شراب)

=== Other works ===
- Practical Issues, Karamad Masa'il (کارآمد مسائل)
- Islamic Curriculum for Women, Khawatin ka Islami Nisab (خواتین کا اسلامی نصاب), 5 volumes
- Pearls of Knowledge, Ilm ke Moti (علم کے موتی)
- Reflections on Faiz Millat, Tasurat Bara-e-Faiz Millat (تاثرات برائے فیضِ ملت)
- Identifying Fatimi and Non-Fatimi Sayyids, Fatimi wa Ghair Fatimi Sayyid ki Pehchan (فاطمی و غیر فاطمی سید کی پہچان)
- History of the Construction of the Ka'bah, Tarikh-e-Tamir-e-Ka'bah (تاریخ تعمیر کعبہ)
- Causes of Salvation of the Deceased, Mayyit ki Nijat ke Asbab (میت کی نجات کے اسباب)
- Benefits of Carrots, Gajar ke Fawa'id (گاجر کے فوائد)
- The Virtues of Betel Leaf, Pan ki Shan (پان کی شان)

== Educational institutions ==
Besides Jamia Owaisia Razvia in Bahawalpur, several seminaries associated with Owaisi's family and students continue to operate in different parts of Pakistan. The Bahawalpur seminary provides religious education to both local and residential students.

== Students ==
Among the scholars reported to have studied under Owaisi are:

- Muhammad Abdul Hakim Sharaf Qadri
- Mufti Muhammad Arshad al-Qadri
- Muhammad Raza Saqib Mustafai
- Muhammad Farooq Bandialvi
- Pir Muhammad Ajmal Raza Qadri
- Abdul Majid Owaisi
- Mufti Muhammad Iqbal Chishti
- Muhammad Ashraf al-Alam Qadri Chatgami
- Qari Muhammad Tayyab Naqshbandi
- Khan Muhammad Qadri
- Mufti Muhammad Amir Ahmad Naqshbandi
- Mufti Muhammad Mateen Naqshbandi
- Agha Abdul Wahid Jan Sarhindi
- Muhammad Kokab Riaz Owaisi
- Tasadduq Hussain Gul Golravi

== Death ==
Owaisi died on 26 August 2010 (15 Ramadan 1431 AH). His funeral prayer was held later that evening at the Central Eidgah in Bahawalpur.

== Legacy ==
Owaisi is remembered in scholarly tradition for his teaching, public lectures and literary contributions. Seminaries established by him and his associates continue to function in Pakistan, and many of his books remain in circulation.A 2024 study published in the journal Tanazur examined Mufti Faiz Ahmad Owaisi's views on naskh (abrogation) in Islamic jurisprudence in comparison with the views of Mufti Taqi Usmani and Javed Ahmad Ghamidi. The study analysed contemporary scholarly perspectives on the interpretation and application of the concept of abrogation in Quranic studies.

== See also ==
- Dars-i Nizami
- Islam in Pakistan
