= Malkana =

Muslim ethnic group found in Uttar Pradesh and Bihar of India

The Malkana are a Muslim ethnic group found in the states of Uttar Pradesh and Bihar of India.

== History and origin ==
In Agra District, the Malkana claimed descent from various number of Hindu castes. Those of the Uttar Pradesh city of Kiraoli, where they occupy five villages, claim descent from a Jat.

In Bihar, the Malkana are mainly concentrated in the erstwhile Shahabad district. In 1923, there were a recorded 1300 Malkanas in Shahabad alone. They adopted Islam, responding to the missionary efforts of Sufi saints. Arya Samaj Swami Shraddhanand's Shuddhi movement wanted to convert them to Hinduism. The word "shudhi" means purification and it implies, rather pejoratively, that Muslims are ritually impure. Many Muslim leaders attempted to counter this forced conversion. Religious tensions prevailed in Shahabad, Gaya and Munger.

There were splits in the community, with some members of the community converted to Hinduism in the early part of the 20th century, during the course of the shuddhi movement. The 'shuddhi' campaign among the Malkanas, was launched in early 1923 and led by the Arya Samaj under Pandit Madan Mohan Malaviya. This re-conversion campaign reached its peak by the end of 1927, by which time some 120 Malkana Muslims are said to have been converted back into the Hindu fold.
