= Manaqib-al-Jaleela =

- Arabic: فقه
- Romanization: Fiqh
- Literal meaning: "deep understanding" "full comprehension"

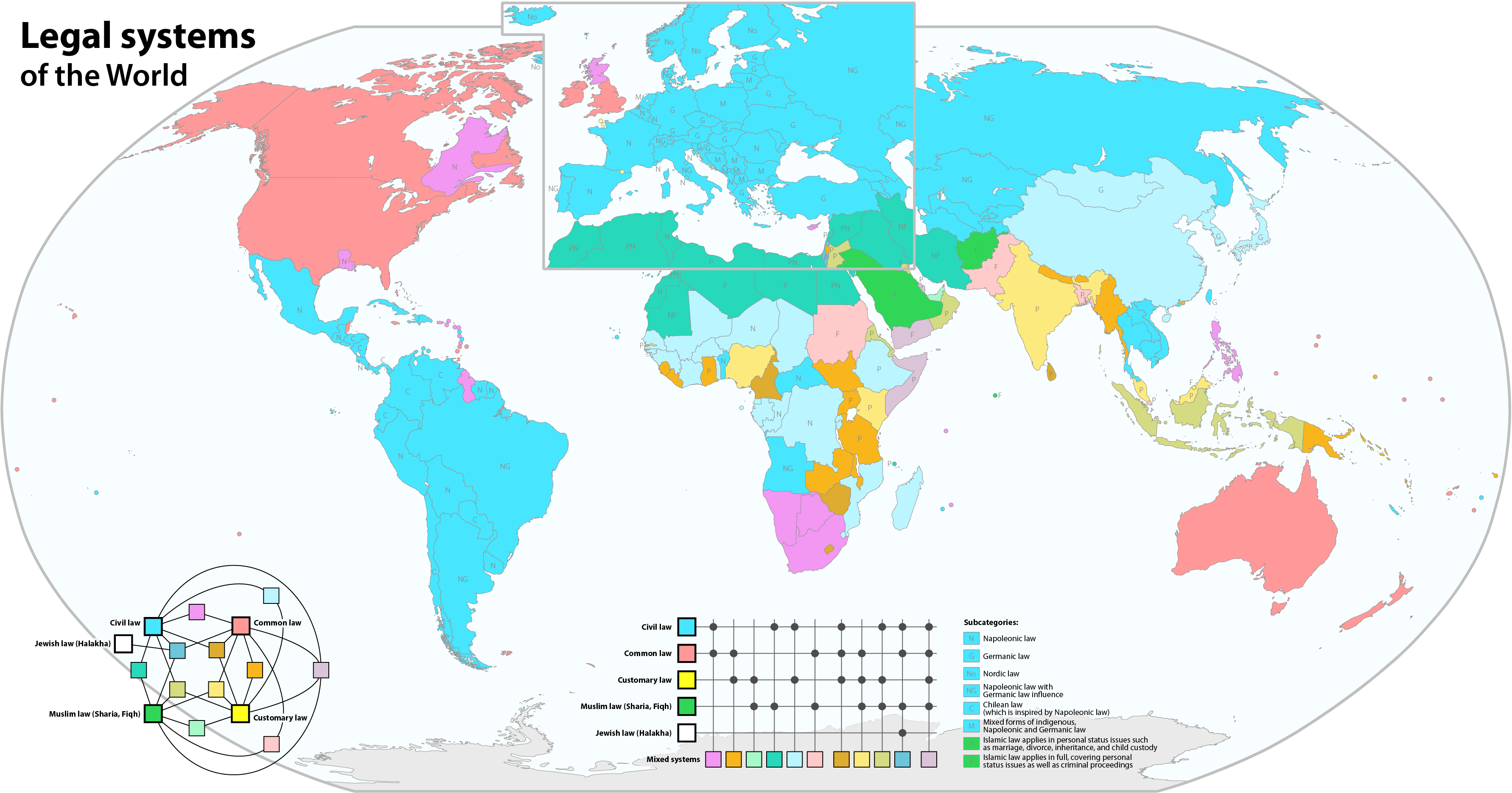
Legal systems of the world

Manaqib-al-Jaleela is a book on Islamic Jurisprudence (Fiqh) written by 20th century Islamic Scholar, Mohammad Abdul Ghafoor Hazarvi. This book deals with the observance of rituals, morals and social legislation in Islam, according to the Hanafi school, spreading over 9 volumes. The book is written in Urdu.

== Description ==
This book is extended over nine volumes of six thousand pages. Each division has a distinct theme. Topics within a division are more or less in the order of revelation. Within each division, each member of the pair complements the other in various ways. The nine divisions are

1. Islamic theological jurisprudence
2. Political aspects of Islam
3. Islamic marital jurisprudence
4. Islamic military jurisprudence
5. Islamic inheritance jurisprudence
6. Islamic hygienical jurisprudence
7. Islamic criminal jurisprudence
8. Islamic economic jurisprudence
9. Adab (Islam)

== See also ==
- List of Sunni books
- Husamul Haramain
- Fatawa-e-Razvia
- Kanzul Iman
