= Okara =

Okara may refer to:

- Okara (food), soy pulp in East Asian cuisines
- Okara, Pakistan, a city in Pakistan
  - Okara District, the highest-level administrative division with the name
  - Okara Tehsil, a lower-level administrative division
  - Okara railway station
  - Okara Cantonment, adjacent to Okara city
- Okara Park, a sports stadium in New Zealand
- Gabriel Okara (1921–2019), Nigerian writer

== See also ==
- Okarvi
- Ocara, a municipality in Brazil
