= Tafsir Ruh al-Bayan =

- Author: Ismail Hakki Bursevi
- Original title: روح البيان في تفسير القرآن
- Language: Arabic
- Subject: Tafsir
- Genre: Sufism
- Publication date: 17th–18th century
- Pages: 10 volumes

Ruh al-Bayan fi Tafsir al-Quran, commonly known as Tafsir Ruh al-Bayan, is a monumental scholarly and spiritual work by the 17th-century Ottoman Sufi and theologian, Ismail Hakki Bursevi (d. 1137 AH). It is renowned across the Islamic world for its unique comprehensiveness. This tafsir is a comprehensive exegesis that extends beyond literal linguistic explanations to highlight the moral counsel and practical aspects of self-purification hidden within Quranic verses. Spanning ten voluminous tomes, this Arabic commentary is a sublime synthesis of inspired knowledge and the wisdom of great saints such as Rumi and Saadi Shirazi. It plays a key role in purifying the heart of the reader and bringing them closer to the divine mysteries.

== Characteristics ==
The work is a comprehensive integration of exegetical rules and the fundamental principles of tafsir. In his celebrated work Al-Itqan fi Ulum al-Quran, Imam Jalaluddin al-Suyuti stipulated mastery in fifteen branches of science and art for the exegesis of the Quran. These fifteen sciences are: Arabic Lexicology (Lughat), Syntax (Nahw), Morphology (Sarf), Etymology (Ishtiqaq), Rhetoric (Ma'ani), Eloquence (Bayan), Embellishment (Badi), Orthoepy (Qira'at), Legal Principles (Qawa'id al-Shar'iyyah), Principles of Jurisprudence (Usul al-Fiqh), Occasions of Revelation (Asbab al-Nuzul), Abrogation (Nasikh wa al-Mansukh), Jurisprudence (Fiqh), Hadith sciences and Infused Knowledge (Ilm al-Mawhibah). All these qualities are present to the highest degree in Tafsir Ruh al-Bayan.

Furthermore, a credible exegete must possess specific attributes: complete mastery in understanding the Quran; formal training under expert teachers in the aforementioned sciences; established piety (taqwa); sound creed; and an absence of self-opinionatedness or arrogance. These attributes were personified by the author. Notably, the author does not record any subject without a reference, presenting every point in accordance with exegetical standards. He encapsulated the spiritual secrets and mysteries one seeks from masters like Rumi, Saadi, Jami, and Ibn Arabi within this work, effectively "bottling an ocean into a jar."

Imam Ismail Hakki Bursevi himself described several prominent features of this exegesis and his methodology as follows:

In this exegesis, rather than detailing numerous conflicting views, I have prioritized brevity to clarify the primary objective and intent of the verses. However, a summary of the credible and authentic exegeses of the predecessors will certainly be included.

Under every verse, I shall provide appropriate yet heart-pleasing counsel and admonition (pand o nasa'ih) so that hearts may be polished and souls may find joy. I will include Persian poetry where appropriate so that the "people of the heart" (ahl al-dil) may attain spiritual tranquility. When citing authentic commentaries, books of jurisprudence or noble Hadiths, I will endeavour to record the original text as much as possible. I may occasionally amend or add to the phrasing for necessity, but I will not allow the meanings or objectives to differ in the slightest.

Instances where I present my own personal view will be rare, and even then, by the grace of Allah, it will be a summary of a discourse by a Perfect Shaykh (Shaykh al-Kamil).

== History ==
Imam Ismail Hakki Bursevi was instructed by his spiritual mentor—a great scholar of Constantinople regarded as the Mujaddid of the 11th century AH—to migrate to the city of Bursa. During his sermons and lectures at the Grand Mosque (Ulu Cami), he felt the need to compile his scattered exegetical notes and scholarly journals into a cohesive form. His objective was not mere fame, but to create a treasure for the Hereafter and a means of intercession in the presence of the Prophet. He describes this in the preface of his work:

After the praise of Allah and blessings upon the Holy Prophet, peace and blessings be upon him, this humble servant, the namesake of Prophet Ishmael the Sacrifice of Allah, confesses his shortcomings and, beseeching the Most Generous Lord for forgiveness and grace, hopes for the rain of His boundless mercy. By the virtue of His generosity in sending the Noble Messenger, peace and blessings be upon him, to His servants, may Allah Almighty accept this effort of mine, protect all my friends from the evil of Satan, make every coming day better until death, and grant us spiritual progression.

The science of tafsir is such a field that stepping into it is not the task of every individual, no matter how powerful or brave they may be, nor can every leader carry this banner, even though it is an exceptionally clear and radiant discourse that requires no further proof. On one hand stands the immense grandeur of this task, and on the other, our lack of leisure and countless shortcomings. I admit that I am of meager capital and limited capacity, but my spiritual mentor—a teacher of great knowledge and insight, the sovereign of his time, a proof of Allah for the creation due to his knowledge and gnosis, the verified heir to the secrets of the vicegerency, the undisputed reviver, of the 11th century, a sayyid by lineage, and the namesake of Hazrat Uthman Ghani, may Allah be pleased with him—commanded: "Proceed toward the city of Bursa, the center of the noble saints; may Allah protect it from evil and strife."

In accordance with the command, I arrived there in 1060 AH and found no recourse but to engage in preaching and counsel. This took place at the Grand Mosque (Ulu Cami), a renowned and luminous station of worship. Prior to this, while residing in certain cities of Rum (Anatolia), I had collected several journals containing exegesis and other sciences. These comprised scattered pages covering the commentary up to slightly beyond Surah Al-Imran. I intended to summarize them, amend or abrogate where necessary, and add subjects worthy of expansion.

Though I am of little capital, if Allah grants me respite, I shall commit this to writing in my leisure so it may serve as a treasure for the Hereafter—rather, as a means of intercession on that Day when there is no intercessor besides the Holy Prophet, peace and blessings be upon him. I pray to Allah that He makes this among the righteous deeds , pure legacies and enduring good deeds until the end of my life; for when that Affectionate Lord intends good for a servant, He makes their deeds beautiful in the eyes of people and makes them worthy of those charities which are most sublime and desirable, for He is the Most Bountiful.

== Translations ==
=== English language ===
A complete translation in English is not yet available; however, translations of selected portions containing Sufi insights and ethical counsels have been published.

=== Urdu language ===
- Fuyud al-Rahman (فیوض الرحمان) (complete translation): Allama Muhammad Faiz Ahmad Owaisi, published by Maktaba Owaisia Rizwia: Bahawalpur, 12 volumes, 2005.
- Taqdis al-Iman (تقدیس الایمان) (abridgment): Allama Qazi Muhammad Abdul Latif Qadri, published by Abdullah Academy: Lahore, 10 volumes, 2021.

=== Turkish language ===
Since Imam Ismail Hakki Bursevi hailed from the Ottoman Empire (modern-day Turkey), this exegesis holds immense significance in the Turkish language. Several complete translations and projects to render it into modern Turkish have been completed: Rûhu’l-Beyân Kur’an Yolu (complete translation), Ömer Faruk Hilmi, Erkam Yayınları / Merve Yayınları: Istanbul, 10 volumes, 2010.

=== Persian language ===
Due to the abundance of Persian poetry (Rumi, Saadi, Hafez) within the exegesis, it holds great significance in the scholarly circles of Iran and Tajikistan. Translations and commentaries of selected portions exist in Persian.

=== Malay and Indonesian languages ===
In the Sufi circles of Southeast Asia, translations of certain parts of this Tafsir are also found in local languages, which are taught in the traditional religious schools (madrasas) of the region.

== See also ==
- Tafsir Ruh al-Ma'ani – A monumental 19th-century commentary by Mahmud al-Alusi that serves as a bridge between traditional exegesis and spiritual insights; it is noted for its encyclopedic breadth and linguistic depth.
- Tafsir al-Mazhari – A prominent 18th-century commentary by Qadi Thanaullah Panipati; it is highly regarded for its synthesis of Hadith scholarship with Sufi perspectives.
- Tazkiyah – The Islamic concept of self-purification and spiritual discipline; it represents the core methodology for the inner development emphasized in these works.
