= All India Sunni Conference =

Barelvi organisation

All India Sunni Conference (Hindi: आल इन्डिया सुन्नी कांफ्रेंस Urdu, آل انڈیا سنی کانفرنس ) was an organization of Indian Sunni Muslims associated with Sufism and this Conference became the voice of Barelvi movement in British India. The Conference was established in 1925 in the wake of Congress led secular Indian nationalism, changing Geo-political situation of India by leading Barelvi personalities of that time including Jamaat Ali Shah, Naeem-ud-Deen Muradabadi, Mustafa Raza Khan Qadri, Amjad Ali Aazmi, Abdul Hamid Qadri Badayuni, Mohammad Abdul Ghafoor Hazarvi and Syed Faiz-ul Hassan Shah among others.

== Foundation ==
A number of Sunni Ulema at the meeting at Jamia Naeemia Moradabad on 16–19 March 1925 set up an organization by the name of Jam'iyat-e-Aliyah-al Markaziah, commonly known as the All India Sunni Conference (AISC). At its inaugural session, Jamaat Ali Shah was elected its president and the convener of the meeting, vice president Mohammad Abdul Ghafoor Hazarvi as Naib Ameer and Naeem-ud-Deen Muradabadi as its Nazim-e-AIa (General Secretary).

== Objectives ==
The main aim of AISC was to unite the Sunni majority of India on one platform and to work for their social, educational and political upliftment among others.

== All India Sessions ==
- The first All India Sunni Conference was attended by three hundred ulema and Mashaikh coming from all over India in 1925. AISC also brought to the forefront anti-Islamic customs in the Muslim society and how to avoid them, need for brotherhood among the Muslims and the role and work of the leaders of Ahl-e-Sunnat Wal Jamaat in the preaching of Islam. In addition, it also stressed need for acquiring modern education for Muslims.
- The Second All India Sunni Conference was held in Badaun in October 1935 under the presidency of Jamaat Ali Shah. He was re-elected as its president. It highlighted the need for unity among the ulema and common Muslims and the role of ulema in Shaheed Ganj Mosque Movement. While criticizing Ibn Saud’s policies in Arabia, the Conference demanded to respect the Holy and sacred places of the Muslims.
- The Third All India Sunni Conference was held on 27–30 April 1946 at Banaras under the presidency of Syed Jamaat Ali Shah which was attended by a large number of people. The Benaras session on 30 April 1946 passed the following resolution. The session of All India Sunni Conference fully supported the demand for Pakistan and declared that Ulema and Mashaikhs belonging to Barelvi movement will aid in the establishment of an Islamic government.

After creation of Pakistan, All India Sunni Conference was converted into Jamiat Ulema-e-Pakistan.

== See also ==
- Jamaat Ali Shah
- Mohammad Abdul Ghafoor Hazarvi
- List of Barelvi organisations
