= Al-Mustafa Centre =

Community organization based in Bradford, England

Al-Mustafa Centre, officially Al-Mustafa Community Trust, is a community organisation based in Bradford, West Yorkshire, England.

The Al-Mustafa Centre, was established in 2002 in Bradford.
