= Mullā Jīvan =

17th-century Indian Islamic scholar

Mullā Jīwan
- Born: 1047 AH; Amethi, near Lucknow, Mughal India
- Died: 1130 AH; Delhi, Mughal India
- Occupations: Islamic scholar, jurist, Qurʾānic commentator
- Writing career
- Language: Arabic, Persian, Urdu
- Period: 17th–18th century
- Genres: Tafsir, Usul al-fiqh, Islamic jurisprudence
- Notable works: Tafsīrāt al-Ahmadiyyah, Nūr al-Anwār fī Sharḥ al-Manār

Ahmad bin Abi Sa‘īd bin Ubaidullah, commonly known as Mullā Jīwan (Arabic: ملا جیون), was born in 1047 AH (circa 1637 CE) in Amethi, Lucknow, India. He hailed from a scholarly environment and memorised the Qurʾān by the age of seven. His formative studies included Islamic jurisprudence (fiqh), Qurʾānic exegesis (tafsīr), hadith, and creed, under notable scholars such as Shaykh Abdul Ahad, Muhammad al-Ashfahani, and Nasrullah al-Ahmadi.

== Career and influence ==
Mullā Jīwan rose to prominence as a jurist, mufassir (Qurʾānic commentator), and muḥaddith (hadith scholar) within the Hanafi tradition. A 2003 lecture hosted by the University of Karachi described him as a key figure in reviving Islam ic education in India, stating that he "wrote 'Tafseerat-al-Ahmadiyah' at the age of 17", and authored a commentary on Minārul Anwār—a work on fiqh that became part of Sindh’s madrasah syllabi.

=== Alleged association with Aurangzeb ===
Some early biographical sources, such as Khazīnat al-Asfiyā by Mufti Ghulam Sarwar Lahori, claim that Jīvan served as a teacher of Emperor Aurangzeb. However, this assertion is chronologically implausible. Mullah Jīvan was born in 1637 CE (1047 AH), whereas Aurangzeb had completed his studies well before that time; furthermore, his own teaching career reportedly began around 1658 CE (1069 AH), long after Aurangzeb's youth. Modern scholarship considers it more likely that Mullah Jīvan instructed Aurangzeb’s daughter, Zeb-un-Nissa, and later maintained close ties with princes such as Bahadur Shah I and Farrukhsiyar, rather than with Aurangzeb himself. The prevailing view holds that the events described were actually connected to Farrukhsiyar (sometimes referred to as "Alamgir II"), and only later misattributed to Aurangzeb (Alamgir I due to a misunderstanding.

== Major works ==
- At-Tafsīrāt al-Ahmadiyyah (التفسیرات الأحمدیة)
- Nūr al-Anwār fī Sharḥ al-Manār

== Death and legacy ==
Mullā Jīwan died in 1130 AH (1717 CE), reportedly in Delhi, and was buried in his native Amethi. His works continued to exert pedagogical and jurisprudential influence across the Indian subcontinent; his tafsīrs remain valued among scholars, especially within Hanafi-oriented academic settings.

== Bibliography ==
- ʻAlī, Ashfāq (1982). Mullā Jīvan ke muʻāṣir ʻulamāʼ (in Urdu). Original from University of California; digitized 14 December 2006. Ashfāq ʻAlī. p. 159.
- مصباحی, طفیل احمد (27 October 2022). Mullā Ahmad Jīwan Amīthvī : Ḥayāt aur K̲h̲idmat ملا احمد جیون امیٹھوی : حیات اور خدمات [Mullah Ahmad Jeevan Amethi: Life and Services] (in Urdu).
