= Shafee Okarvi =

Pakistani religious scholar and orator

Muhammad Shafi Okarvi

Personal life
- Born: Muhammad Shafee; 2 February 1930 Khemkaran, Punjab Province, British India
- Died: 24 April 1984 (aged 54) Karachi, Pakistan
- Children: Kaukab Noorani Okarvi
- Education: Ashraf ul Madaris
- Known for: His vigorous and inspiring speeches
- Occupation: Religious scholar

Religious life
- Religion: Islam
- Denomination: Sunni
- Jurisprudence: Hanafi
- Tariqa: Naqshbandi (Mujaddidi)
- Movement: Barelvi (Jamaat Ahle Sunnat)

Muslim leader
- Awards: Sitara-i-Imtiaz (Star of Excellence) Award by the President of Pakistan in 1985
- Arabic name
- Personal (Ism): Shafīʿ شفيع
- Patronymic (Nasab): ibn Karam Ilāhī ibn Allāh Ditta ibn Imām ad-Dīn بن كرم إلهي بن الله دتة بن إمام الدين
- Toponymic (Nisba): al-Awkārwī الأوكاروي al-Kīmkaranī الكيمكرني

Muhammad Shafee Okarvi (Urdu: اردو نام: محمد شفیع اوکاڑوی; 2 February 1930 – 24 April 1984), also known by his honorific as Maulana Muhammad Shafee Okarvi, was a Pakistani religious scholar and orator. He was one of the founders of the Jamaa'at-e-Ahle-Sunnat Pakistan and the Gulzaar-e-Habeeb Trust. He has received various honors from the Pakistani government and private institutes including the Sitara-e-Imtiaz. Over a span of thirty-eight years, Okarvi delivered over 18,000 speeches on many religious topics.

== Early life and education ==
Okarvi was born in Khem Karan, East Punjab, India, to Haaji Shaiekh Karam Ilaahi, a local businessman. He was the eldest son of seven siblings. He began his education by learning to read and memorise the Quran and he completed middle school.

== Personal life ==
Okarvi married at a young age and fathered eleven children, these being five sons and six daughters. In 1952, however, his two eldest sons, three-year-old Muneer Ahmad and 14-month-old Tanveer Ahmad, died within a week of each other. His eldest son, Kaukab Noorani Okarvi, continues his father's religious work.

== Religious and academic work ==
In 1947, after migrating from India, he and his father built Masjid Ghausiyah in Okara. In 1950, he began leading Friday prayers and teaching the congregation at Jaame Masjid Muhaajireen in Sahiwal and became the head of the Department of Religion at Birla High School (renamed Sutlej Cotton Mills High School) in Okara.

From 1952 to 1953, he contributed to the Tahreek-e-Tahaffuz-e-Khatm-e-Nubuwwat, which is an organization created to persecute Ahmadi Muslims. In 1954, he also established the Jaami'ah Hanafiyah Ashraf-ul-Madaaris on Grand Trunk Road in Okara and remained one of its mentors and sponsors.

In 1955, he visited Karachi for the first time when he lectured at the Jaame Masjid Aaraam Bagh on the first Laylat al-Qadr. The following year he became the lecturer and Imam of Memon Masjid and he founded Jamaat Ahle Sunnat and became its first chairman.

== International endeavors ==
Okarvi preached in the Far East, Middle East, India, Palestine, South Africa, United Arab Emirates, Mauritius and many other countries. He sold 100,000 cassettes of his speeches in South Africa before 1980. Video cassettes of his speeches are also widely distributed internationally.

In 1962, Okarvi travelled to Baghdad, Syria, Karbala, Beirut, Jeddah, Makkah and Madinah. He visited the shrines of many spiritual and religious scholars as well as many notable mosques and historical holy places.

In 1976, Okarvi established in South Africa, Anjuman Ahl-e-Sunnat Wa Jamaa'at.

In 1974, Okarvi formed the Jamaa'at e Ahle Sunnat in Durban, South Africa, which attracted up to 10,000 members.

Okarvi made the journey to Mecca for Hajj, Ziyaarat and Umrah sixteen times.

== Political and social contribution ==
He was elected to the National Assembly of Pakistan in 1977.

He was made the Chief of Tahreek-e-Khatm-e-Nabuwwat in Sahiwal district in 1952–1953.

=== Imprisonment ===
Okarvi was arrested for his persecution of the Ahmadiyya Muslim community. He remained in Montgomery prison for 10 months. During this period of imprisonment, his first two sons, Muneer Ahmad (3 years old) and Tanveer Ahmad (1 1/4 years old), died within a week.

=== Assassination attempt ===
On 16 October 1962 in Khadda Market, Karachi, an assassination attempt was made on Okarvi during one of his speeches. He received wounds on his neck, shoulders, head and upper back. Okarvi stayed under treatment in the hospital for two and a half months. While giving his statement to the police officer Okarvi said:

"I have no personal grudge with anyone. Nor I am a criminal. If I did any crime it is only this that I preach the religion of Islam and do praise and glorification of Saiyyid-ul-'Aalameen (Master of the entire Universes'), Muhsin-e-Insaaniyat (Benefactor of the humanity), Huzoor Rahmat-ul-lil Aalameen (Mercy of the Universes) (Sallal Laahu 'Alaiehi Wa Sallam). I do not want to take any revenge from anyone and nor do I want anything to be done against the attackers. My blood has been shed unnecessarily. My Allaah, Rabb-e-Kareem accepts this and makes this mediation for my salvation. I forgive the attackers. Whereas, for establishing peace, you people do what is appropriate so that this kind of incident does not take place again."

He did not appoint a lawyer for this case or follow any hearings. On recovery he occupied himself in preaching Islam and delivered his very first lecture at the same place where the attempted assassination happened.

== Death and legacy ==
In 1974, Okarvi had a heart attack. In 1975, he had another heart attack and came to Karachi, where he received cardiac treatment for six weeks. On 20 April 1984, he delivered his last speech at the congregation of Jum'ah Salaat at Jaame Masjid Gulzar-e-Habeeb. That evening, Okarvi had a third heart attack and was admitted to the National Institute of Cardiovascular Diseases. After three days, on 24 April 1984, he died at the age of 54.

== Awards and recognition ==
On 23 March 1985, President Zia-ul-Haq awarded the Sitara-e-Imtiaz (Star of Excellence) to Okarvi due to his contributions and religious services in Pakistan. In 2013, he was posthumously awarded the Nazaria-i-Pakistan Trust Gold Medal by Chief Minister Shahbaz Sharif as a Pakistan Movement activist.
