= Kaukab Noorani Okarvi =

Pakistani Islamic scholar, orator (born 1966)

Khatib-e-Millat Kaukab Noorani Okarvi
- کوکب نورانی اوکاڑوی
- Title: Okara

Personal life
- Born: August 17, 1955 (age 71) Karachi, Pakistan
- Parent: Muhammad Shafee Okarvi (father)
- Education: Ashraf ul Madaris
- Occupation: Religious scholar
- Website: www.kaukabnooraniokarvi.com

Religious life
- Religion: Islam
- Denomination: Sunni
- Jurisprudence: Hanafi
- Tariqa: Naqshbandi
- Movement: Barelvi (Jamaat Ahle Sunnat)
- Arabic name
- Personal (Ism): Kawkab كوكب
- Patronymic (Nasab): ibn Shafīʿ ibn Karam Ilāhī ibn Allāh Ditta ibn Imām ad-Dīn شفيع بن كرم إلهي بن الله دتة بن إمام الدين
- Toponymic (Nisba): an-Nūrānī النوراني al-Awkārwī الأوكاروي

Kaukab Noorani Okarvi (Urdu: کوکب نورانی اوکاڑوی; born 17 August 1966) is a Pakistani religious scholar and writer of Ahle-Sunnat Wa Jamaa’at Sunni. He is the son of Muhammad Shafee Okarvi, who was the founder of the Jamaat Ahle Sunnat, the main Barelvi organisation of Pakistan.

== Early life and education ==
Okarvi was born in Karachi, Pakistan. Before his birth in a family of eleven brothers and sisters, his two eldest brothers had died. He is from a business family of Yeman who embraced Islam through Abu Bakr. His ancestors came to India centuries ago for business and settled there. His elders were mostly businessmen by profession but personally they had a spiritual temperament in nature. In his book, Deoband to Bareilly he writes, "To tell you the truth, I am a mere seeker of knowledge in the fields of religion, spirituality, and scholastic matters. This little bit recognition of letters and words and the skills of experimenting with them that have come to me, it is mostly because of my environment which was due to my kind parents, paternal grandfather, maternal grandmother, teachers and holy people. These revered and respected personalities have guided my learning at every stage of my life." Okarvi's early childhood was spent in Okara, Pakistan. He received his early religious and worldly education at Jaami’ah Ashraf ul Madaris in Okara. He memorized the Quran at the age of eleven years, taught by Muhammad Abdul Lateef Amjad Sa’eedi. He was admitted to the second grade at Government Boys Primary School. He led the assemblies with Qira’at and Na’at. In middle school he organized a competition of Qirat and Na’at for children.

In 1962, he became the secretary of Bazm-e-Adab and later became its president. During his school and college days he participated in various debates, Qirat and Na’at competitions and also received prizes for it.

During that period he developed love for poetry and literature. At the age of 13, he established an organization of students and youth called "Bazm-e-Shaheen Pakistan". Its main purpose was to inculcate religious principles, support poor students, and organize competitions of Qira’at, Na’at and speeches and to celebrate Islamic festivals. He also took leave from the school for one and a half years so he could memorize the Qur'an. In 1957 and 1971, during the war between Pakistan and India, he collaborated with the National Defense and Boy Scouts. In 1971, he passed his matriculation examination from Government Boys Secondary School, P. E.C.H. Society Karachi. In 1973, he passed his intermediate examination from Government National College, Karachi and he was awarded his advance degrees. He later traveled out of Pakistan to take his PhD degree in Economics.

== Teachings ==
Okarvi's teachings are not confined to institutions or classrooms. To students of all ages, he lectures in large congregations of thousands of people. He often travels to far off villages and cities, during cold bitter nights and warm summers where people gather to listen to his speeches. The medium of his teaching is through speeches, television, radio, computer, books, magazines, and newspaper. He started writing a newspaper column at the age of eight years. In 1967, his first radio program was broadcast. He received ten rupees for a show and in 1969 he appeared on television, for which he received twenty rupees for a show. To date, three thousands of his shows have been televised. In twenty eight years after the departing of his beloved father he has only been able to thoroughly explain seven parts of the holy Qur'an, due to his research in each topic in the Friday congregation in Jaame Masjid Gulzar-e-Habeeb, Karachi.

His live and recorded shows are broadcast regularly from many TV channels in Pakistan. In many foreign countries like the Middle East, Africa, India, U.S., U.K and Bangladesh his television shows are televised. He is interviewed by many prominent TV personalities on different magazines, newspapers.

== Personal life ==
When asked why he has no interest in politics, he replied, "I can't lie, I don't like hypocrisy and breaking promises. I don't want to gather bad prayers (du’aa) of the people. There are only two topics of my life: purity and sincerity. Everything which is pure; it is good. People should not sit idle they should work and stay busy. I demand perfection and quality in everything. Whoever work it may be it should be good." When asked how he developed his humor he replied, "Gham Sehh kar Hansna Hansaana Aa gaya" ("I learned to laugh and make others laugh after enduring pain").

== Library ==
He has said: "My first love was with books. At the age of six years I started collecting them. Up till now my personal library has a collection of over 50,000 books." These books are in Arabic, Persian, English and Urdu languages. They are of a wide variety of topics including Islam and all its teachings, Urdu literature, fiction, science, history and general knowledge. Some of his books are used as reference texts by students and scholars.

== Orator of the Nation ==
He has been called "Khateeb-e-Millat" (Orator of the Nation) by majority of his admirers and followers. He wanted to become a researcher and a professor, but his father wanted him to become a religious and spiritual scholar like him. Therefore, initially part-time and then in 1984, after his father's death, Okarvi started giving formal orations and teaching.

He began serving as the Imam and Khatib for Friday prayers at the Jaame Masjid Gulzar-e-Habib in Karachi. This role continues to the present. He leads Friday prayers and provides commentary on the Qur'an. Discussion of specific topics may span several months. His speeches are delivered during Muharram, Ramadan, and on nights such as Jum’atul Wadaa and Laylat al-Qadr.

== Maulana Okarvi Academy Al-A’lami ==
Since 1984 Okarvi has been the chairman of Gulzar-e-Habib Trust. Under its management the Jaame Masjid Gulzar-e-Habeeb, Jaami’ah Islaamiyah Gulzar-e-Habeeb and Masjid Noor-e-Habeeb has been expanded manifold in term of construction, and purposes. On 27 April 1984, he established the Maulana Okarvi Academy (Al-A’lami). He has established three international organizations; are Sawaad-e-A’zam, Ahle Sunnat Haqeeqee and International Sunni Movement which are non-profit and non-political movements. Branches of these organizations are working internationally. Beside this he manages charities (Sadaqaat-e-Jaariyah) and two organizations for the printing of Islamic books: Karmaan Waalaa Publishers and Noorani Kutub Khaanah.

== Foreign endeavors ==
In 1975, he went for the first Umrah and spent a whole month of Ramadan in Medina. In 1976, he performed his first hajj. In 1977, he traveled to India for the first time where he visited many cities, shrines, mosques and gave lectures.

This was the year of centennial celebration of the poet Muhammad Iqbal. Here he was interviewed on All India Radio Urdu service. In 1979 he visited Syria, Jordan, Iraq, Turkey, Egypt, and Saudi Arabia. In 1980, he visited India, the United Kingdom, the United States, South Africa, the Middle East and Australia. In 1990, he again visited the United Arab Emirates to give lectures. These were also broadcast on the local TV.

In 1990, he visited Mauritius and French Islands La Reunion to give lectures. Here the local radio and television covered his visit. Since then he has often been invited by Muslim groups in different countries to give lectures. It was always his desire to start his journey to any country via Madinah so that he could receive the blessings of Muhammad. Therefore, he has visited Madinah more than 50 times.

In South Africa, he revived his father's mission. Between 1987 and 1991, Okarvi was invited to South Africa six times. During this period, he visited Swaziland, Botswana, Bophuthatswana, Mozambique, Mauritius, Re-union, Lesotho and Zimbabwe. He authored eight books, which were also translated to English.

In 1996, he established Jamaa’at Ahle Sunnat in America. He established for the first time many religious schools in many countries. In Pakistan as well as abroad he participated in many educational and religious conferences. He has preached in more than fifty-one countries, including Saudi Arabia, Syria, Jordan, Iraq, Egypt, Turkey, United Arab Emirates, Oman, Kenya, Zimbabwe, Malawi, Re-union, Lesotho, South Africa, Botswana, Swaziland, Mauritius, France, India, Bangladesh, Afghanistan, Europe, Australia and US. He has visited some of these countries several times. So far hundreds of people have embraced Islam through him.

== Views about other sects of Islam ==
In his book, From Deoband to Bareilly, he wrote: "Even earlier, I was greatly distressed by this thought but lately it increased even more when I visited the African countries. I witnessed this strange phenomenon among the adherents of Islam living in my own homeland and also far away from the homeland that they are after (each other’s throat) their own collars. Why point accusing fingers at others? Even the so-called wayfarers of the road to Madinah, the preachers are changing the truth and truthfulness, and the standard-bearers of peace and security (self-proclaimed) are with their tongues, pens and deeds, disgracing their own Millat and group, their own Masjid and pulpit."

The book was first published in English by Maulana Okarvi Academy (Al-A'lami) in South Africa and then in Urdu in Pakistan. This book became popular with the public.

== See also ==
- Maulana Muhammad Shafee Okarvi – his father
