= Jamaat Ahle Sunnat =

Sunni Barelvi organisation

- Abbreviation: JAS
- Type: Religious organisation
- Legal status: Active
- Purpose: Muslim religious organization
- Region served: Pakistan
- Key people: Pir Syed Haseenudin Shah; Pir Syed Riyaz Hussain Shah; Shah Turab ul Haq Qadri

Jamaat Ahle Sunnat (Urdu: جماعت اہلِ سنت), is a Muslim religious organization in Pakistan that represents the Barelvi movement. It is supported by Mashaikh including all spiritual centers. As a Sunni organisation it has adopted many Sufi customs and traditions. Jamaat e Ahle Sunnat is a representative of the Sunni (Sufi) nation of Pakistan. It works under the supervision of spiritual centers including Golra Sharif, Sial Sharif, Pakpattan Sharif, and others.

== History ==
In the 20th century, the Barelvi movement spread beyond India to other parts of South Asia and the Muslim world, and became known as Ahl e sunnat wal jamat. The movement has been associated with political movements in Pakistan, particularly the Jamiat Ulema-e-Pakistan party, an Islamic party. The organization emphasized the importance of following the Sunnah and the teachings of the four orthodox schools of Shariah. They also placed great importance on the veneration of the Islamic prophet Muhammad and the Sufi saints.

== Attacks ==
In 2006, a bomb attack on a Jamaat Ahle Sunnat-organised event to celebrate the mawlid (birthday of Muhammad) in Karachi killed at least 63 people and injured over 80. Among the dead were several Barelvi religious figures, including the senior leadership of Jamaat Ahle Sunnat and Sunni Tehreek. Three men said to belong to the Lashkar-e-Jhangvi were indicted for the crime.

In 2011, scholars from the organization advised Muslims not to attend the funeral of Salmaan Taseer, the Punjab governor who had recently been assassinated in response to his outspoken beliefs against blasphemy laws.

On 20 March 2014, attackers shot and killed a Crime Branch sub-inspector and wounded another in Anwar Jafri near the Coast Guard roundabout in Korangi, Karachi. Sources attributed the attack to Ahle Sunnat Wal Jamaat (ASWJ-Pakistan). In addition, two Lashkar-e-Jhangvi members were arrested for the killing.

It was not until February 2015 that Jamaat Ahle Sunnat started to perpetrate murders more often. These attacks continued in 2016. The most important attack in that year was on 29 October, when armed assailants shot at a Shia procession in Nazimabad, Karachi, killing five civilians and wounding six others. Sources attributed the attack to both Ahle Sunnat Wal Jamaat and Lashkar-e-Jhangvi.

On 2 February 2018, militants shot dead two people, including Hazrat Abbas, the caretaker of a Imambargah, in Dera Ismail Khan, Khyber Pakhtunkhwa. In October, suspected Jamaat Ahle Sunnat members shot dead a police officer in Karachi. Hizbul Ahrar claimed the murder, but authorities questioned the claim and attributed the attack to Ahle Sunnat Wal Jamaat or Lashkar-e-Jhangvi.
