= Jamia Naeemia Moradabad =

Islamic seminary in India

- JNM
- Type: Islamic university
- Established: 1925
- Founders: Naeem-ud-Deen Muradabadi
- Affiliations: Barelvi movement
- Principal: Mufti Ayub Khan Naeemi Bhagalpuri
- Students: 1000+ (Approximately)
- Location: Moradabad, Uttar Pradesh, India
- Website: jamianaimia.com

Jamia Naeemia Moradabad (Urdu: جامعہ نعیمیہ مراد آباد, Hindi: जामिया नईमिया मुरादाबाद) is an Islamic seminary in India. It is located in Moradabad in the northern state of Uttar Pradesh. The seminary is a major center of the Barelvi movement in India and has been the target of violence by the rival Deobandi movement.

== History ==
It started off as a madrasa in the town of Moradabad. It was named 'Naeemia' after the name of Naeem-ud-Deen Muradabadi, a Sunni Islamic scholar. It has produced several leading ulemas of Sunni Sufi movement.

In 1925 (1343H), an All India Sunni Conference’s first summit was organised at Jamia Naeemia Moradabad, whose aims included the unification of "the Sunni majority" under a single political, economic, and socio-religious platform. It was attended by the more than two hundred and fifty religious scholars. Sajjada-nashin of Dargah Syed Ashraf Jahangir Semnani, Syed Mohammad Izhar Ashraf taught at Jamia Naeemia Moradabad

== Courses ==
- Dars e Nizami
- Alim
- Fazil

== Fatwas ==
The Darul Ifta Jamia Naeemia Moradabad issued a fatwa against Samajwadi Party leader Azam Khan for allegedly forcefully snatching land of cemetery grounds and other properties from the poor.

== Notable alumni ==
- Syed Muzaffar Hussain Kichhauchhavi, poet, politician and farmer

== See also ==
- Jamia Nizamia
- Jamiatur Raza
- Al-Jame-atul-Islamia
- Manzar-e-Islam
