= Shuddhi (Hinduism) =

Sanskrit term for conversion to Hinduism

Shuddhi is a Sanskrit word meaning purification or cleansing. In the context of modern Hinduism, it describes a Hindu religious movement started by Arya Samaj, initially aimed at re-converting former Hindus who departed the religion for Christianity or Islam, but later expanded to convert non-Hindus altogether. This term is also present in some medieval smritis, as well as in later Sikh literature, also in the context of re-conversion.

== Etymology ==
Shuddhi is derived from the Sanskrit word शुद्धि śuddhi ("purified"), the past passive participle of the verb शुध् śudh ("to purify"). This word ultimately derives from Proto-Indo-European *(s)ḱew- ("to shine"). Although the Sanskrit word शुद्धि was inherited into Hindi as सुध sudh and into Punjabi as ਸੁੱਧ suddh, both inherited words are generic and neither are used to refer to the shuddhi movement.

== Origins ==
The practice of shuddhi began by the 10th century AD as a response to Islamic incursions into the Indian subcontinent and the subsequent conversion of Hindus to Islam, and is credited with reversing the mass Islamic conversions in the wake of Muhammad ibn Qasim's conquest of Sindh. Some smritis were composed in Sanskrit during this time to promote shuddhi, such as the Devala Smriti, Atri Samhita, and Brihadyana Smriti, all of which were cited in Arya Samaji pandit J. B. Chaudhary's 1930 publication Shuddhi Sanatan Hai. The Devala Smriti is the most detailed of these texts, but it is lost and only partially survives in quotations from later writers. Multiple reconstructions have therefore been attempted throughout the 20th century, with the most extensive being done by Mukund Lalji Wadekar in 1982.

The Devala Smriti prescribes shuddhi rituals for anyone from the ages of 11 to 80. This would even include women who were impregnated by Muslim men, who would have to undergo the santapana krcchra penance of consuming cow urine, cow dung, milk, ghee, and kusha grass, fasting for one day and night and cleaning their private areas with ghee. Additionally, such women would be considered half-mleccha until they gave birth, which is when they would regain their caste, but their child would be considered pratiloma (impure mixed-caste) and hence could not be retained. However, shuddhi rituals were usually not this strict, and were permissible for individuals who had followed Islam for less than 20 years (unless they committed forbidden acts, such as killing or consuming cows, or having intercourse with non-Hindu women, in which case that period would be less than 4 years). The author of the Devala Smriti tied Islamic conversion (and even mere association with Muslims) to caste contamination, which would require shuddhi; since Muslim Arab conquest was not yet seen as a full-fledged imperial project, but as another migration in a long line of barbarian mleccha incursions which ended in their eventual settlement and Hinduisation.

The author of the Devala Smriti is said to be highly unorthodox by the standards of the time. The historian Al-Biruni writes that his Brahmin informants did not accept the readmission of Hindu converts to Islam back into their caste and religion. The practice of shuddhi disappeared by the 12th century AD, and the idea that Hindus must be born into the religion took hold, as Hindu proselytisation activities gradually ceased.

== Arya Samaj movement ==
The socio-political movement, derived from ancient rite of shuddhikaran, or purification was started by the Arya Samaj, and its founder Swami Dayanand Saraswati and his followers like Swami Shraddhanand, who also worked on the Sangathan consolidation aspect of Hinduism, in North India, especially Punjab in early 1900s, though it gradually spread across India. Shuddhi had a social reform agenda behind its rationale and was aimed at abolishing the practise of untouchability by converting outcasts from other religions to Hinduism and integrating them into the mainstream community by elevating their position, and instilling self-confidence and self-determination in them. The movement strove to reduce the conversions of Hindus to Islam and Christianity, which were underway at the time.

In 1923, Swami Shraddhanand founded the 'Bhartiya Hindu Shuddhi Mahasabha' (Indian Hindu Purification Council) and pushed the agenda of reconversion, which eventually created a flashpoint between Hindus and Muslims as Hindus were the recipients of the violence.. Mahatma Gandhi made a comment on Swami Shraddhananda in an article titled 'Hindu-Muslim-Tensions: Causes and Resistance' in the May 29, 1922 issue of Young India.

Swami Shraddhananda has also become a character of disbelief. I know that his speeches are often provocative. Just as most Muslims think that every non-Muslim will one day convert to Islam, Shraddhananda also believes that every Muslim can be initiated into the Aryan religion. Shraddhananda ji is fearless and brave. He alone has built a great Brahmacharya Ashram (Gurukul) in the holy Ganges. But they are in a hurry and it will move soon. He inherited it from the Aryan society."

Gandhi further wrote Dayanand that "he narrowed one of the most liberal and tolerant religions of the world." Swami responded to Gandhi's article that "If Aryasamaji is true to themselves, then the allegations of Mahatma Gandhi or any other person and invasions also cannot obstruct the trends of Arya Samaj." Shraddhanand followingly kept moving towards his goal.

The main point of contention was the reconversion of Malkana Rajputs in western United Province As a result, the movement became controversial and antagonised the Muslims populace and also led to the assassination of the leader of the movement, Swami Shraddhanand by a Muslim in 1926. After Swami Shraddhanand died this movement continued.

In the late 1920s, prominent Goan Hindu Brahmins requested Vinayak Maharaj Masurkar, the prelate of a Vaishnava ashram in Masur, Satara district; to actively campaign for the 're-conversion' of Catholic Gaudas to Hinduism. Masurkar accepted, and together with his disciples, subsequently toured Gauda villages singing devotional bhakti songs and performing pujas. These means led a considerable number of Catholic Gaudas to declare willingness to come into the Hindu fold, and a Shuddhi ceremony was carefully prepared. On 23 February 1928, many Catholic Gaudes in Goa were re-converted to Hinduism notwithstanding the opposition of the Church and the Portuguese government. The converts were given Sanskrit Hindu names, but the Portuguese government put impediments in their way to get legal sanction for their new Hindu names. 4851 Catholic Gaudes from Tiswadi, 2174 from Ponda, 250 from Bicholim and 329 from Sattari were re-converted to Hinduism after nearly 400 years. The total number of the converts to Hinduism was 7815. The existing Hindu Gauda community refused to accept these neo-Hindus back into their fold because their Catholic ancestors had not maintained caste purity, and the neo-Hindus were now alienated by their former Catholic coreligionists. These neo-Hindus developed into a separate endogamous community, and are now referred to as Nav-Hindu Gaudas (New Hindu Gaudas).

However, in Northern India this movement faced stiff opposition from Islamic organisations such as the Barelvi movement's Jama'at Raza-e-Mustafa which attempted to counter the efforts of the Shuddhi movement to convert Muslims to Hinduism in British India. Beginning in the 1920s, Muslim organisations began seeking out new converts from the Chuhra caste in-response to the Shuddhi movement.

== In Sikhism ==
In the Shamsher Khalsa, a volume of the Twarikh Guru Khalsa historical treatise written by Giani Gian Singh, there are several accounts dated to the first half of the 18th century AD labelled "shuddh karna" (Punjabi: ਸ਼ੁਧ ਕਰਨਾ or ਸ਼ੁੱਧ ਕਰਨਾ, "purification"), where Sikhs who were forcibly converted to Islam during wartime were then re-converted to Sikhism after the defeat of Muslim forces. A notable episode is the "Turknian Shuddh Karnian" (Punjabi: ਤੁਰਕਨੀਆਂ ਸ਼ੁੱਧ ਕਰਨੀਆਂ, "purification of Islamic[ised] women") which took place after Vadbhag Singh Sodhi's defeat of Nasir Ali, whose army captured and raped women and forcibly converted them to Islam. Re-conversion into Sikhism only required retaking Khande Ki Pahul.

== See also ==
- Shaucha
- Ghar Wapsi

== Sources ==
- Kreinath, Jens; Hartung, Constance; Deschner, Annette (2004). Kreinath, Jens; Hartung, Constance; Deschner, Annette (eds.). The dynamics of changing rituals: the transformation of religious rituals within their social and cultural context. Peter Lang. ISBN 978-0-8204-6826-6.
- Jones, Kenneth W. (1987). Socio-Religious Reform Movements in British India: Socio-Religious Reform Movements in British India. Vol. III–I. Cambridge University Press. ISBN 0-521-24986-4.
- Ghai, R. K. (1990). Shuddhi Movement in India: A Study of Its Socio-political Dimensions. Commonwealth Publishers.
- Bhatt, Chetan (2001). Hindu Nationalism: Origins, Ideologies and Modern Myths. Berg Publishers. ISBN 1-85973-348-4.
- Geoffrey, A. Oddie (1991). "10: Reconversion to Hinduism: The Shuddhi of the Arya Samaj". Religion in South Asia: Religious Conversion and Revival Movements in South Asia in Medieval and Modern Times. Manohar. p. 215.
- Shirodkar, Dr Prakashchandra; Mandal, H. K. (1993), Kumar Suresh Singh (ed.), Anthropological Survey of India, People of India, vol. 21: Goa, Popular Prakashan, ISBN 978-81-7154-760-9
