= Naeem-ud-Deen Muradabadi =

Indian scholar, poet (1887–1948)

Islamic scholar Mufti Naeem-ud-Deen-Muradabadi
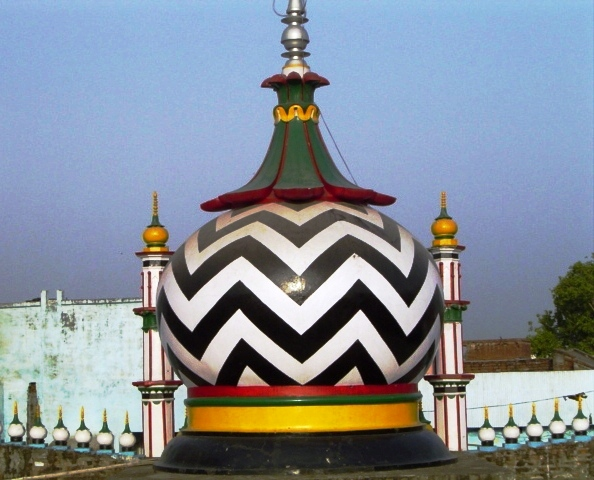
- Title: Sadr ul-Afazil

Personal life
- Born: 1 January 1887 (21 Safar 1300 Hijri) Moradabad, North-Western Provinces, British India
- Died: 13 October 1948 (aged 61) (18 Dhu al-Hijjah 1367 Hijri) Moradabad, United Provinces, India
- Resting place: Jamia Naeemia Moradabad (Moradabad, India)
- Region: South Asia
- Main interest(s): Fiqh, Tafseer
- Notable works: Tafsir Khaza'in-al-Irfan; Kitab-ul-Aqa'id; Deewan-e-Urdu
- Occupation: Mufti

Religious life
- Religion: Islam
- Denomination: Sunni
- Founder of: Jamia Naeemia Moradabad
- Jurisprudence: Hanafi
- Tariqa: Qadri
- Creed: Maturidi
- Movement: Barelvi

Muslim leader
- Influenced by: Ahmed Raza Khan Abu Hanifa Abdul Qadir Gilani Mu'in al-Din Chishti Nizamuddin Auliya Al-Suyuti Ibn Abidin Qadi Iyad

Syed Naeem-ud-Deen Muradabadi (1887–1948), also known as Sadr ul-Afazil, was an Indian jurist, scholar, mufti, Quranic exegete, and educator. He was a scholar of philosophy, geometry, logic and hadith and leader of All India Sunni Conference. He was also a poet of na`at.

== Early life ==
He was born on 1 January 1887 (21 Safar 1300 AH) in Moradabad, India to Mu'in al-Din. His family originally came from Mash'had, Iran. Sometime during the rule of King Aurangzeb, they travelled from Iran to India, where they received a land grant from the ruling monarchy. They eventually reached Lahore and settled near Abul-Hasanat'.

Muradabadi memorised the Qur'an by the age of 8. He studied Urdu and Persian literature with his father and studied Dars-i Nizami with Shah Fadl Ahmad. He subsequently earned a degree in religious law from Shah Muhammad Gul and pledged allegiance to him.

== Religious activities ==
Naeemudin wrote in defense of Prophet Muhammad’s Sallallahu 'Alaihi Wa Salam knowledge of the unseen, in addition to works attacking Wahhabism, and thereby quickly gained acceptance among Sunni Barelvi scholars. He also developed a reputation as a skilled debater, taking on Deobandis and others as his opponents.

One of his first moves was to find the Jamia Naeemia Moradabad long-lasting legacy which became a regional center of Sunni Barelvi activities.

He organised conferences, debates and door to door programmes under the Jama’at-e-Raza-e-Mustafa, to control and reverse, the wave of re-conversions which was threatening the Muslim community in the wake of the Shuddhi movement. He through JRM successfully prevented around four hundred thousand re-conversions to Hinduism specially in eastern parts of Uttar Pradesh and in Rajasthan.

He was elected as Nazim-e-AIa (General Secretary) of All India Sunni Conference AISC in 1925 at Jamia Naeemia Moradabad. AISC under him arose as a response to the Deobandi-dominated Jamiat-e-Ulema-e-Hind. An important resolution passed against the Nehru Committee Report which was described as dangerous for the interests of the Muslims and also targeted Jamiat-e-Ulema-e-Hind leadership as “working like puppets in the hands of the Hindus.

Allama Naeem Uddin took part in Islamic movements and was also a part of the Khilafat Committee, an organization aimed at strengthening the Sultanate in Turkey, which had existed since the beginning of the Ottoman era. He taught students and gave lectures.

He visited Agra, Jaipur, Kishan Garh, Gobind Garh, Hawali of Ajmer, Mithar and Bharatpur to protest the 'Shuddhi Movement' which was viewed as a threat to Islam in the region. In 1924 (1343 Hijri), he issued the Monthly 'As-Sawad-al-Azam' and supported the Two nation theory at All India Sunni Conference.

After the separation of Pakistan from British India on 18 September 1948, Muradabadi delivered a speech at the opening of the All India Sunni Conference. He contributed to the passing of the resolution for a separate Muslim state at Minto-Park (Lahore Resolution). He was the Chief Organizer at the Banaras Conference held in 1942.

== Death ==
Muradabadi fell ill while preparing a book and died on 18 Dhu al-Hijjah 1367 AH (13 October 1948). His last words were lā ʾilāha ʾillā -llāh^{u} muḥammadun rasūlu -llāh^{i)}. His shrine is located near the university of Jamia Naeemia in Muradabad.

== Works ==
He wrote fourteen books and numerous treatises, including Khaza'in-al-Irfan, which is the Tafsir (Exegesis) of Kanz al-Iman based on a translation of the Qur'an by Ahmed Raza Khan Barelvi in Urdu. He also left a collection of poems called Riyaz-e-Naeem (Garden of Comfort).

Muradabadi's works include:

- Tafsir Khaza'in-al-Irfan
- Naeem ul Bayan Fi Tafseer ul Quran
- Alkalimatul Ulya Li Ilai Ilm Ul Mustafa
- Atyab al-Bayan Radd-e-Tafwiyatul Iman A lengthy rebuttal on Ismael Delvi's Taqwiya-tul Iman
- Muzalim e Najdiya
- Aswat ul Azab ala Qawamie Al-Qibab
- Adab-ul-Akhyar
- Sawaneh Karbala
- Seerat-e-Sahaba
- At-tahqiqat li daf' al-Talbisat
- Irshad Al-Anam Fi Mehfil al Mawlid wal Qiyam
- Kitab-ul-Aqa'id
- Zaad ul Haramain
- Al-Mawalat
- Gulban e Ghareeb Nawaz
- Shahrah Shahrah Miata Amil
- Paracheen Kal
- Fanne Sipah Giri
- Shahrah Bukhari (Incomplete)
- Shahrah Qutbi (Incomplete)
- Riyaz e Naeem
- Kashf ul Hijab Masail Aysal ul Sawab
- Faraid ul Noor Fi Jarah Ul Quboor
- Deewan-e-Urdu

He was a successor of Ahmad Raza Khan and Sayyad Muhammad Ali Hussain Shah al-Kicchochawi.
