= Barelvi movement =

South Asian Islamic revivalist movement

The Barelvi movement, is a Sunni revivalist movement that generally adheres to the Hanafi and Shafi'i schools of jurisprudence, the Maturidi and Ash'ari creeds, a variety of Sufi orders, including the Qadiri, Chishti, Naqshbandi and Suhrawardi orders, as well as many other orders of Sufism, and has hundreds of millions of followers across the world. They consider themselves to be the continuation of Sunni Islamic orthodoxy before the rise of Salafism and the Deobandi movement.

The Barelvi movement is spread across the globe with millions of followers, thousands of mosques, institutions, and organizations in India, Pakistan, Bangladesh, Afghanistan, Sri Lanka, the United Kingdom, South Africa and other parts of Africa, Europe, the Caribbean, and the United States.

As of 2000, the movement had around 200 million followers globally but mainly located in Pakistan and India.

The movement claims to revive the Sunnah as embodied in the Qur'an, literature of traditions (hadith) and the way of the scholars, as the people had lapsed from the Prophetic traditions. Consequently, scholars took the duty of reminding Muslims to go back to the 'ideal' way of Islam. The movement drew inspiration from the Sunni doctrines of Shah Abdur Rahim (1644-1719) founder of Madrasah-i Rahimiyah and one of the compilers of Fatawa-e-Alamgiri. Shah Abdur Rahim is the father of Shah Waliullah Dehlawi. The movement also drew inspiration from Shah Abdul Aziz Muhaddith Dehlavi (1746 –1824) and Fazl-e-Haq Khairabadi (1796–1861) founder of the Khairabad School. Fazle Haq Khairabadi Islamic scholar and leader of 1857 rebellion issued fatwas against Wahhabi Ismail Dehlvi for his doctrine of God's alleged ability to lie (imkan-i kizb) from Delhi in 1825. Ismail is considered as an intellectual ancestor of Deobandis.

The movement emphasizes personal devotion and adherence to Sīrah of the Islamic prophet Muhammad, sharia and fiqh, following the four Islamic schools of thought, the usage of Ilm al-Kalam and Sufi practices such as veneration of and seeking help from saints among other things associated with Sufism. The movement defines itself as an authentic representative of Sunni Islam, Ahl-i-Sunnat wa-al-Jamāʿat (The people who adhere to the Prophetic Tradition and preserve the unity of the community).

Ahmed Raza Khan Barelvi (1856–1921), who was a Sunni Sufi scholar and reformer in north India, wrote extensively, including the Fatawa-i Razawiyya, in defense of the status of Muhammad in Islam and popular Sufi practices, and became the leader of the Barelvi movement.

== Terminology ==
The Barelvi movement is also known as the Ahl al-Sunnah wal-Jama'ah. According to Oxford Reference, Ahl al-Sunnah wa'l-Jamaah or Barelvi is movement developed on the basis of writings of Mawlana Ahmed Raza Khan Barelwi. The Database of Religious History refers the movement as the Ahl-e-Sunnat wa Jamaat (often, Ahl-e-Sunnat) which has a very strong presence in South Asia.

Professor Usha Sanyal, an expert on 'Ahl-i Sunnat Movement', referred the movement as Ahl-i Sunnat. She wrote that the movement refer to themselves as 'Sunnis' in their literature and prefer to be known by the title of Ahle Sunnat wa Jama'at a reference to the perception of them, as forming an international majority amongst Sunnis, although Barelvi is the term used by section of media to refer to this specific movement arising from Sunni Islam.

Main leaders of Ahle Sunnat movement Imam Ahmad Raza Khan and other scholars never used the term 'Barelvi' to identify themselves or their movement; they saw themselves as Sunni Muslims defending traditional Sunni beliefs from deviations. Only later was the term 'Barelvi' used by the section of media and by opposition groups on the basis of the hometown Bareilly, of its main leader Imam Ahmed Raza Khan Qadri (1856–1921). The Barelvis are also called Sunni Sufis.

Islamic scholar and teacher of Ahmed Raza Khan Qadri, Maulana Naqi Ali Khan (1830-1880) had refuted the ideas of Sayyid Ahmad Barelwi (d. 1831), who was a founder of Wahhabism in India. Naqi Ali Khan declared Sayyid Ahmad Rae Barelwi, a 'Wahhabi' due to his support for Muhammad ibn Abd al-Wahhab's ideology. Similarly, founder of Khairabad school, Allama Fazl-e-Haq Khairabadi in 1825 in his book 'Tahqîqul-Fatâwâ' and Allama Fazle-Rasûl Badayûnî in his book 'Saiful-Jabbâr' issued Fatwas against the founders of Ahl-i Hadith and Deobandi movements Fazle Haq Khairabadi Islamic scholar and leader of 1857 rebellion issued fatwas against Wahhabi Ismail Dehlvi for his doctrine of God's alleged ability to lie (Imkan-i-Kizb) from Delhi in 1825. Ismail is considered as an intellectual ancestor of Deobandis. This refutation of traditional scholars against newly emerging Wahabi sect influenced Sunni scholars such as Ahmed Raza Khan Qadri and paved the way for more organised movement which later came to be known as Ahle-Sunnat movement in South Asia. The movement formed as a defense of the traditional mystic practices of South Asia, which it sought to prove and support.

The Ahl-i Sunnat or Sunni Barelwi movement began in the 1880s under the leadership of Ahmad Raza Khan (1856-1921), who spent his lifetime writing fatwas (judicial opinion) and later established Islamic schools in 1904 with the Manzar-e-Islam in the Bareilly and other madrasas in Pilibhit and Lahore cities. The Barelvi movement formed as a defense of the traditional mystic practices of South Asia, which it sought to prove and support.

The movement views themselves as Sunni or Ahle Sunnat wal Jamaat and according to it main leaders of the movement including Imam Ahmad Riza Khan, did not invent new sect but defended traditional Sunni Islam. According to Ahle Sunnat scholars, Deobandis have created a new sect. The Sunni madrasas of this movement have rarely, if ever, been involved in extremist politics and militancy.

=== Propagation against the Shuddhi (Arya Samaj conversion) Movement ===
Hindu Arya Samaj, through its founder Swami Dayanand Saraswati initiated converting Muslims back in to Hinduism specially in North India, and Punjab in the early 1900s. They became active in Bharatpur State and they also preached to the neo-Muslim Malkanas, in Etawah, Kanpur, Shahajahnpur, Hardoi, Meerut and Mainpuri in the western United Provinces, exhorting them to return to what they believed was their 'ancestral religion'. As a result, the movement became controversial and it also antagonized the Muslims populace To counter this movement Indian Muslims started Islamic Dawa work among the Muslim population and challenged the Arya Samaj leaders for debates. Mufti Naeemuddin Moradabadi, Mustafa Raza Khan Qadri and Hamid Raza Khan along with a team of Ahle Sunnat scholars through Jama'at Raza-e-Mustafa worked in north Indian towns and villages against the Shuddhi movement. The Jama'at Raza-e-Mustafa prevented around four hundred thousand conversions to Hinduism in eastern U.P and Rajasthan during its activities under anti-Shuddhi movement {{Citation needed}}. In 1917, Islamic scholar Mufti Naeem-ud-Deen Muradabadi organized the historical Jama'at Raza-e-Mustafa conference at Jamia Naeemia Moradabad U.P, with a mission to curb, and if possible reverse, the tide of re-conversions threatening the Muslim community in the wake of the Shuddhi movement.

=== Shaheed Ganj Mosque Movement ===
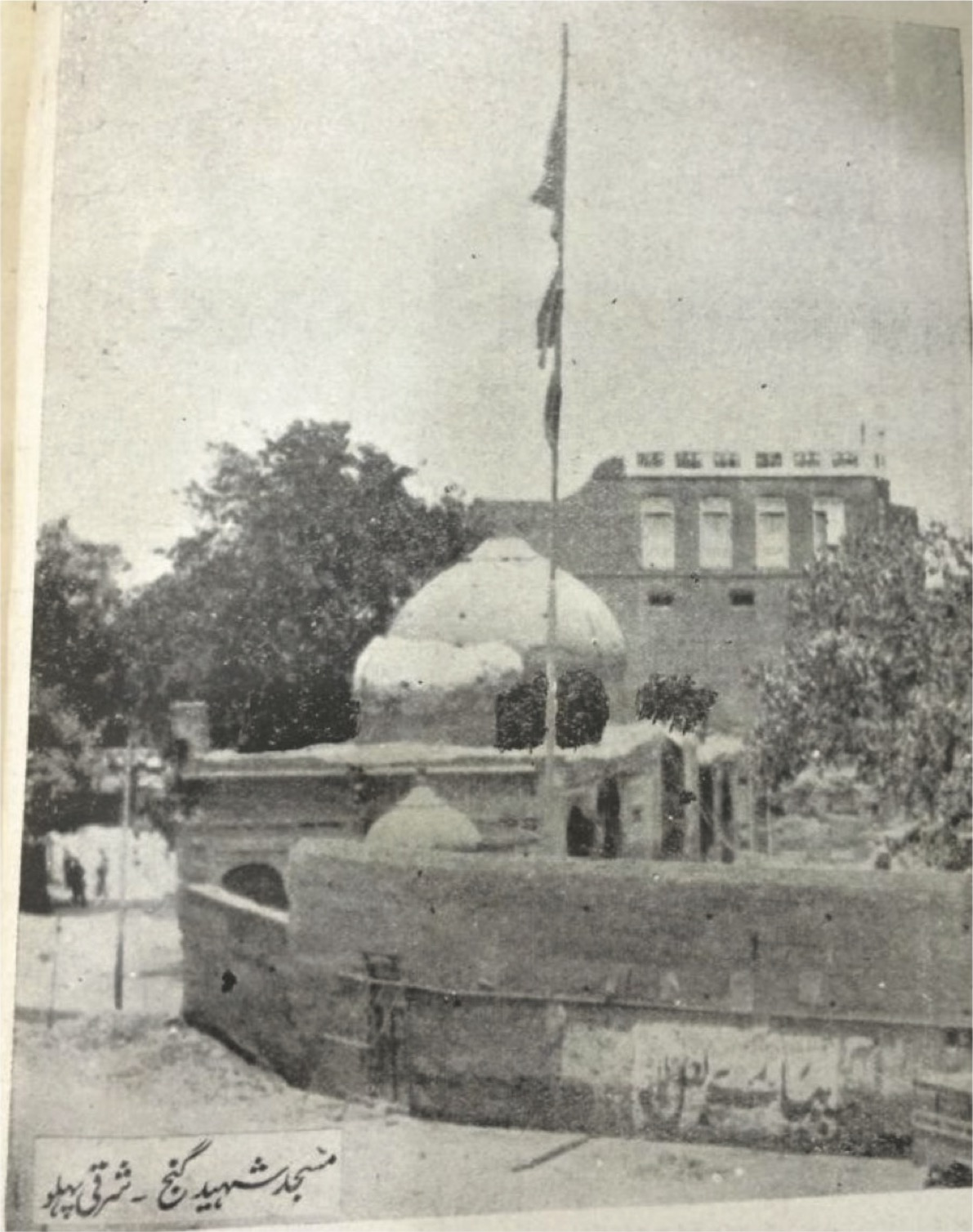
Masjid Shahidganj (Shaheed Ganj Mosque, originally named the Abdullah Khan Mosque), ca.1930's

Shaheed Ganj Mosque was commissioned in 1722 during the reign of Mughal Emperor Alamgir II and built by Abdullah Khan. The construction was completed in 1753. It was located in Naulakha Bazaar area of Lahore, Punjab, Pakistan. In 1762, the Bhangi misl Sikh army conquered Lahore and occupied the mosque. The Muslims were not allowed to enter and pray, although Sikhs were given the right to pray. The Sikhs built a gurdwara in the courtyard while the Mosque building was used as a residence for the Sikh priest. On 17 April 1850, a case was in Punjab High Court. Several suits were filed between 1853 and 1883 to recover the Shaheed Ganj Mosque, but courts maintained the status quo. On 29 June 1935, the Sikhs announced that they would demolish the Shaheed Ganj Mosque. Several thousand Muslims assembled in front of the mosque to protect it. But, on the night of 7 July 1935 the Sikhs demolished the mosque, leading to riots and disorder in Lahore. Ahle Sunnat scholar and Sufi Peer Jamaat Ali Shah of Sialkot, Pakistan, led the Shaheed Ganj Mosque movement. Muslims held a public meeting on 19–20 July 1935 at the Badshahi mosque, and marched directly on the Shaheedganj mosque. Police opened fire on the crowd to kill more than a dozen.

Peer Jamaat Ali Shah presided over the first session of the Conference to organize protests against the demolition. He was appointed the Chief of the protests. "Shaheedganj Day" was observed on 20 September 1935 under his leadership. His appointment as leader of this movement garnered support from other Sunni scholars. Fazal Shah of Jalalpur and Ghulam Mohiuddin of Golra Sharif, Zainulabedin Shah of the Gilani family from Multan and Anjuman Hizb-ul-Ahnaf from Lahore offered support to Shah's leadership. This consensus created a religious and political base which reduced urban-rural differences. The struggle continued for several years.

=== All India Sunni Conference ===
Ahle Sunnat established in 1925 a body of Islamic scholars and Sufis named All India Sunni Conference, in the wake of Congress led secular Indian nationalism, changing geo-political situation of India. Islamic scholars and popular leaders Jamaat Ali Shah, Naeem-ud-Deen Muradabadi, Mustafa Raza Khan Qadri, Amjad Ali Aazmi, Abdul Hamid Qadri Badayuni, Mohammad Abdul Ghafoor Hazarvi and Pir Syed Faiz-ul Hassan Shah were the main leaders. In 1925, its first Conference was attended by three hundred Ulema and Mashaikh. AISC focus was on Unity, brotherhood, preaching and protection of Islamic faith with a stress on need for acquiring modern education for Muslims. The Second Conference was held in Badaun U.P in October 1935 under the Presidency of Jamaat Ali Shah. It discussed Shaheed Ganj Mosque Movement. and openly opposed Ibn Saud's policies in Arabia, the Conference demanded to respect the Holy and sacred places of the Muslims. The third Conference held on 27–30 April 1946 at Benaras discussed the disturbed condition of the country and possible solution for the Muslims in the wake of demand for Pakistan.

- All India Muslim League

Several Sufi Barelvi scholars supported the All-India Muslim League and Pakistan's demand claiming that Congress aimed at establishing Hindu state and arguing, that Muslims need to have their own country. Few Barelvi scholars opposed the partition of India and the League's demand to be seen as the only representative of Indian Muslims.

Main roles played by Ahle Sunnat movement scholars and leaders:

| Name | Years | Role |
|---|---|---|
| Mujadid Imam Ahmed Raza Khan Barelvi Muhaddis | (1856–1921) | Main leader of Ahle Sunnat Movement, Hanafi Jurist, Mujadid, Sufi, Reformer and Author of several hundred books and treaties on various branches of Islamic sciences. |
| Peer Jamaat Ali Shah | (1834–1951) | Sufi Shaikh and leader of All India Sunni Conference, Pakistan movement and Shaheed Ganj Mosque movement. |
| Mufti Hamid Raza Khan | (1875–1943) | Sufi scholar and President of the Jama'at Raza-e-Mustafa |
| Maulana Naeem-ud-Deen Muradabadi Sadrul Afazil | (1887–1948) | Founder of All India Sunni Conference) Jamia Naeemia Moradabad |
| Mustafa Raza Khan Qadri Mufti Azam-e- Hind | (1892–1981) | Grand Mufti of India and did the Dawah work against Shuddhi Movement. |
| Maulana Abdul Hamid Qadri Badayuni | (1898–1970) | Main leader of Pakistan movement and All India Sunni Conference. |
| Peer Syed Faiz-ul Hassan Shah of Allo Mahar Shareef | (1911–1984) | Islamic religious scholar, orator, poet, writer and Chairman of Jamiat Ulema-e-Pakistan and Majlis-e-Tahaffuz-e-Khatme Nabuwwat. |
| Mohammad Abdul Ghafoor Hazarvi | (1909–1970) | Theologian, Jurist and Chairman of Majlis-e-Tahaffuz-e-Khatme Nabuwwat. |
| Justice Muhammad Karam Shah al-Azhari | (1918–1998) | Justice, Supreme Court of Pakistan, Author, of Tafsir Zia ul Quran (1995) (in five volumes) Zia un Nabi (1995) (a detailed biography of Muhammad in seven volumes) |

== Beliefs ==
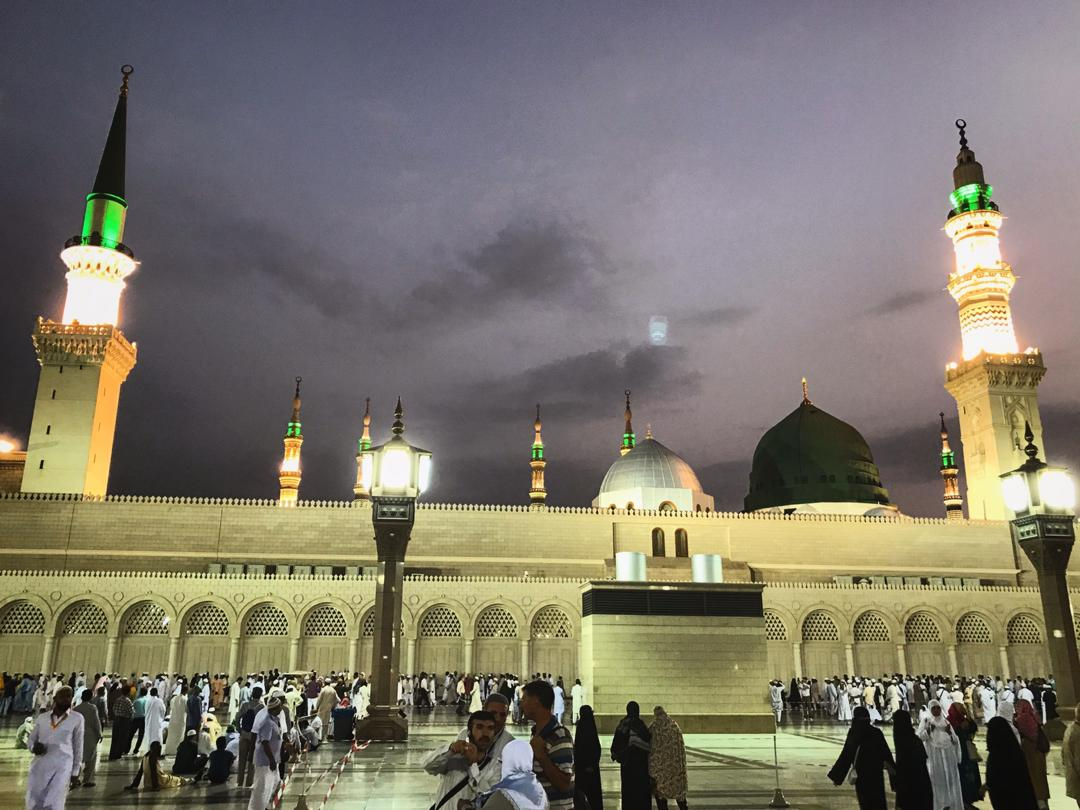
Muhammad's personality is central theme of Ahle Sunnat movement

Like other Sunni Muslims, they base their beliefs on the Quran and Sunnah and believe in monotheism and the prophethood of Muhammad. Although Barelvis may follow any one of the Ashari and Maturidi schools of Islamic theology and one of the Hanafi, Maliki, Shafi'i and Hanbali madhhabs of fiqh in addition to optionally choosing from one of the Sunni Sufi orders or tariqas, most Barelvis in South Asia follow the Maturidi school of Islamic theology, the Hanafi madhhab of fiqh and the Qadiri or Chishti Sufi orders. Barelvis in Southern parts of India such as Kerala, Karnataka and Tamil Nadu follow Shafi'i maddhab of fiqh and Ashari school of Islamic Theology. Barelvis have mostly the same beliefs and structure of Sunni Sufis around the world as they celebrate Mawlid, belief in Taqleed, belief in Sufi saints and follow Sufi orders.

== Positions ==
The movement is defined by a set of theological positions that revolve around the persona of Muhammad and his special, if not exceptional, relationship and status with God. Several beliefs and practices differentiate the movement from others (particularly Deobandis and Wahhabis including beliefs in the intercession of Muhammad, the knowledge of Muhammad, the "Nur Muhammadiyya" (Light of Muhammad), and whether Muhammad witnesses the actions of people.

=== Intercession of Muhammad ===
All jurists comprising Shafi'i, Maliki, Hanafi and Hanbali unanimously agree on the permissibly of tawassul whether during the lifetime of Muhammad or after it.

Tawassul is a fundamental belief of all traditional Sunni movements. The belief is that Muhammad helps in this life and in the afterlife. According to this doctrine, God helps the living through Muhammad. Sunni Muslims of the Barelvi movement believe that any ability that Muhammad has to help others is from God. The help received from Muhammad is therefore considered God's help. Proponents of this belief look to the Quran 4:64 for proof that God prefers to help through Muhammad. One of the titles of the Prophet is "shaafi," or "one who performs intercession." Other spiritual leaders who will act as intermediaries will be prophets, martyrs, huffaz of the Quran, angels, or other pious people whom God deems fit. Jesus's intercession for believers on the Day of Judgment is mentioned in the Quran (5:16-18), as well. They also believe that, on the Day of Judgement, Muhammad will intercede on behalf of his followers, and God will forgive them their sins and allow them to enter Jannah ("paradise"). The belief that Muhammad provides support to believers is a common theme within classical Sunni literature. The Quran says, O you who believe! Fear Allah and seek a wasila to him (5:35). Further, the Quran says, We sent not the Messenger, but to be obeyed, in accordance with the will of Allah. If they had only, when they were unjust to themselves, come to the Messenger and asked Allah's forgiveness, and the Messenger had (also) asked forgiveness for them, they would have found Allah indeed Oft-returning, Most Merciful. (Al-Qur'an, Surah an-Nisa, 4:64)

The belief that Muhammad intercedes is found in various Hadith, as well. A Bedouin of the desert visited the Prophet's tomb and greeted the Prophet, addressing him directly as if he were alive. "Peace upon you, Messenger of God!" Then he said, "I heard the word of God 'If, when they had wronged themselves . . .,' I came to you seeking pardon for my mistakes, longing for your intercession with our Lord!" The Bedouin then recited a poem in praise of the Prophet and departed. The person who witnessed the story says that he fell asleep, and in a dream he saw the Prophet saying to him, "O 'Utbi, rejoin our brother the Bedouin and announce [to] him the good news that God has pardoned him!"

Syrian Islamic scholars Salih al-Nu'man, Abu Sulayman Suhayl al-Zabibi, and Mustafa ibn Ahmad al-Hasan al-Shatti al-Hanbali al-Athari al-Dimashqi have similarly released fatwas in support of the belief.

Al-Suyuti, in his book History of the Caliphs, also reports Caliph Umar's prayer for rain after the death of Muhammad, and specifies that on that occasion, Umar was wearing his mantle (al-burda)—a detail confirming his tawassul through Muhammad. Sahih al-Bukhari narrates a similar situation as:

Whenever there was drought, 'Umar bin Al-Khattab used to ask Allah for rain through Al-'Abbas ibn 'Abd al-Muttalib, saying, "O Allah! We used to request our Prophet to ask You for rain, and You would give us. Now we request the uncle of our Prophet to ask You for rain, so give us rain." And they would be given rain."

— Sahih al-Bukhari Book 57 Hadith 59

A Hadith states that on that day people will be running to and fro looking for an intercessor, until they come to Muhammad, who will answer, "I am for intercession". The Lord will then ask him to "...intercede, for your intercession will be heard" (Bukhari).

Sunni Muslims of this movement also commonly say Ya Rasul Allah ('O Messenger of Allah'), addressing Muhammad in the present tense with the belief that he is able to listen. They believe that Muhammad is a Rahmah (mercy) to all creation as mentioned in the Quran 21:107. Muhammad therefore is a means by which God expresses his attribute, Ar-Rahman, to creation.

=== Light of Muhammad (Nur Muhammadiyya) ===
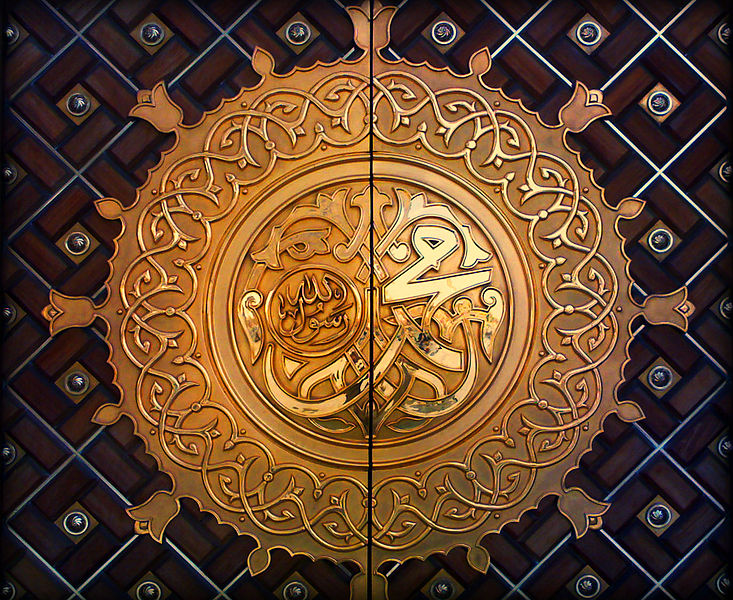
"Prophet Muhammad" written on the door of the Prophets Mosque

A central doctrine of this movement is that Muhammad is both human and (Noor) light. Muhammad's physical birth was preceded by his existence as a light which predates creation. The primordial reality of Muhammad existed before creation, and God created for the sake of Muhammad. Adherents of this doctrine believe that the word Nur (light) in the Quran5:15 refers to Muhammad.

Sahl al-Tustari, the ninth-century Sunni Quran commentator, describes the creation of Muhammad's primordial light in his tafsir. Mansur Al-Hallaj (al-Tustari's student) affirms this doctrine in his book, Ta Sin Al-Siraj:

That is, in the beginning when God, Glorified and Exalted is He, created him as a light within a column of light (nūran fī ʿamūd al-nūr), a million years before creation, with the essential characteristics of faith (ṭabāʾiʿ al-īmān), in a witnessing of the unseen within the unseen (mushāhadat al-ghayb bi'l-ghayb). He stood before Him in servanthood (ʿubūdiyya), by the lote tree of the Ultimate Boundary [53:14], this being a tree at which the knowledge of every person reaches its limit.

When there shrouded the lote tree that which shrouded [it]. This means: "that which shrouded" the lote tree (ay mā yaghshā al-shajara) was from the light of Muḥammad as he worshipped. It could be likened to golden moths, which God sets in motion towards Him from the wonders of His secrets. All this is in order to increase him [Muḥammad] in firmness (thabāt) for the influx [of graces] (mawārid) which he received [from above].

According to Stūdīyā Islāmīkā, all Sufi orders are united in the belief in the light of Muhammad.

=== Muhammad as witness ===
Another central doctrine of this movement is that Muhammad is a viewer and witness (حاضر و ناظر, Ḥāḍir-o nāẓir) actions of people. The doctrine appears in works predating the movement, such as Sayyid Uthman Bukhari's (d. ca. 1687) Jawahir al-Quliya (Jewels of the Friends of God), describing how Sufis may experience the presence of Muhammad. Proponents of this doctrine assert that the term Shahid (witness) in the Quran (33:45, 4:41) refers to this ability of Muhammad, and cite hadiths to support it.

This concept was interpreted by Shah Abdul Aziz in Tafsir Azizi in these words: "The Prophet is observing everybody, knows their good and bad deeds, and knows the strength of faith (Imaan) of every individual Muslim and what has hindered his spiritual progress."

Hafiz Ibn Kathir says: "You are witness of the oneness of Allah Almighty and that there is no God except Allah. You will bear evidence about the actions and deed of whole mankind on the day of judgment. (Tafseer Ibne Katheer, Vol. 3, Page 497).

=== Muhammad's Knowledge of the Unseen (Ilm-e-Ghaib) ===
A fundamental Sunni Barelvi belief is that Muhammad has knowledge of the unseen, which is granted him by Allah (ata'e) and is not equal to God's knowledge. This relates to the concept of Ummi as mentioned in the Quran (7:157). This movement does not interpret this word as "unlettered" or "illiterate", but "untaught". Muhammad learns not from humankind, but from Allah; his knowledge is universal, encompassing the seen and unseen realms. This belief predates this movement, and is found in Sunni books such as Rumi's Fihi Ma Fihi:

Mohammed is not called "unlettered" [Ummi] because he was incapable of writing or reading. He is called "unlettered" [Ummi] because with him writing and wisdom were innate, not taught. He who inscribes characters on the face of the moon, is such a man not able to write? And what is there in all the world that he does not know, seeing that all people learn from him? What can the partial intellect know that the Universal Intellect [Muhammad] does not possess?

Allah has sent down to you the Book and Wisdom and has taught to you what you did not know, and great is the grace of Allah upon you" [Sura an-Nisa, verse 113].

Imam Jalal udin Al-Suyuti writes: (Taught to you what you did not know) means that Allah Most High has told the Prophet (may Allah bless him and grant him peace) of Ahkam and Unseen.

Qur'an states: This is of the tidings of the Unseen which We inspire in thee (Muhammad). Thou thyself knewest it not, nor did thy folk (know it) before this. Then have patience. Lo! the sequel is for those who ward off (evil).[Surah Hud (11), verse 49]

Qur'an states: Nor will He disclose to you the secrets of the Unseen. "But He chooses of His Apostles [for the purpose].[Sura Aali-Imran, verse 179]

=== Practices ===
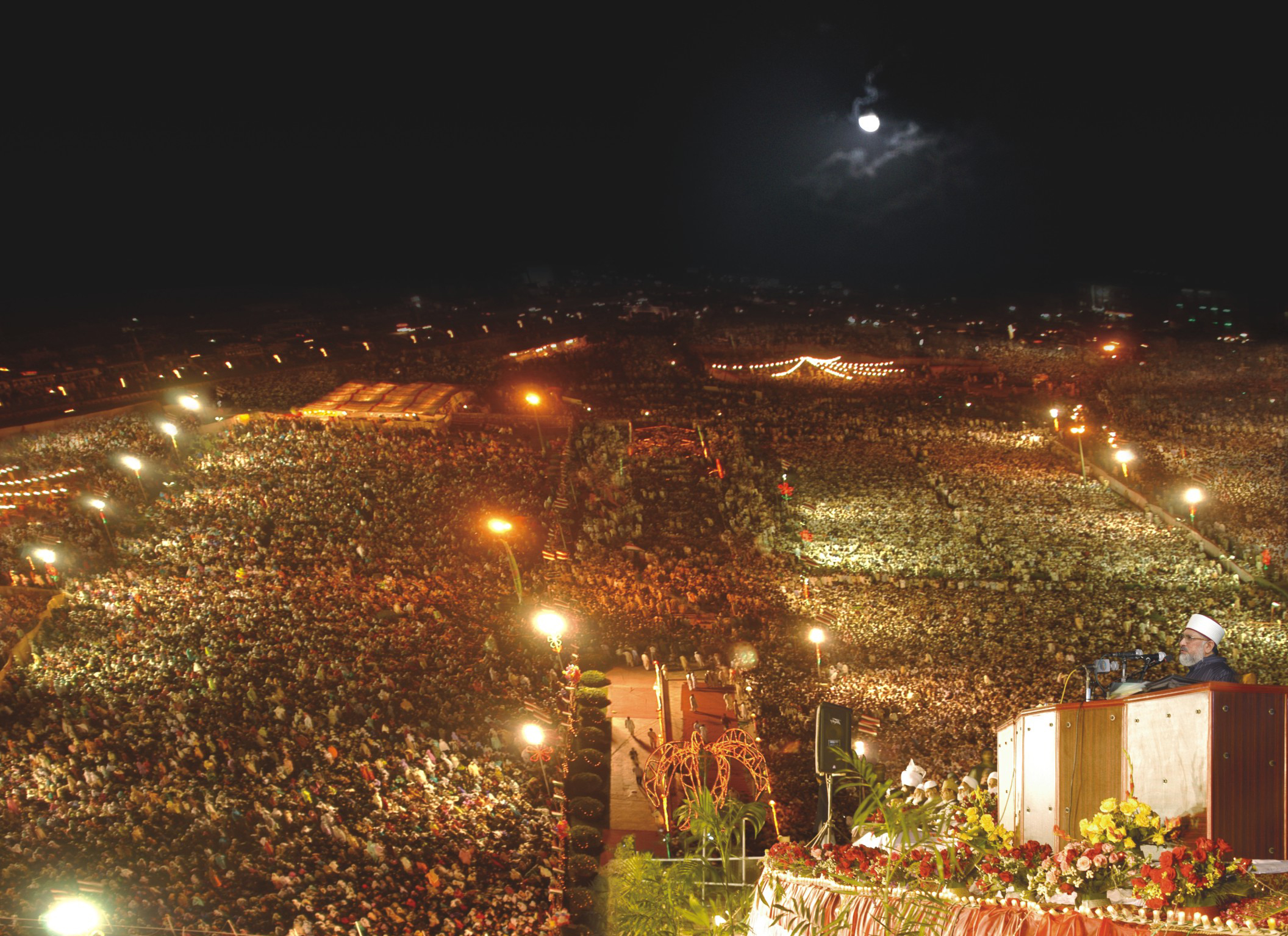
International Mawlid Conference at Minar-e-Pakistan Lahore

- Public celebration of Muhammad's birthday, a practice of Sunni majority world wide
- Tawassul-(Veneration of pious). This consists of the intervention of an ascending, linked and unbroken chain of holy persons claimed to reach ultimately to Muhammad who Barelvis believe intercede on their behalf with God.

The Qur'an states:

If, when they had wronged themselves, they had come to you, and asked forgiveness from God, and the Messenger had asked forgiveness for them, they would have found God Relenting, Merciful.

— Al-Qur'an, Surah an-Nisa, 4:64

This verse raised the question as to whether or not Muhammad's mediation was still possible after his death. A number of Islamic scholars including Al-Nawawi, Ibn Kathir and Ibn al-Athir in his exegesis said: "A Bedouin of the desert visited the Prophet's tomb and greeted the Prophet, addressing him directly as if he were alive. "Peace upon you, Messenger of God!" Then he said, "I heard the word of God 'If, when they had wronged themselves . . .,' I came to you seeking pardon for my mistakes, longing for your intercession with our Lord!" The Bedouin then recited a poem in praise of Muhammad and departed. The person who witnessed the story says that he fell asleep, and in a dream he saw Muhammad saying to him, "O 'Utbi, rejoin our brother the Bedouin and announce [to] him the good news that God has pardoned him!"

All jurists comprising Ja'fari, Shafi'i, Maliki, Hanafi and Hanbali are unanimous on the permissibility of tawassul whether during the lifetime of Muhammad or after his death. Syrian Islamic scholars Salih al-Nu`man, Abu Sulayman Suhayl al-Zabibi, and Mustafa ibn Ahmad al-Hasan al-Shatti al-Hanbali al-Athari al-Dimashqi have similarly released Fatwas in support of the practice.

Caliph Umar's prayer for rain after the death of Muhammad and specifies that on that occasion 'Umar was wearing his mantle (al-burda), a detail confirming his tawassul through Muhammad at that occasion, as reported by Al-Suyuti in his book History of the Caliphs. Sahih al-Bukhari narrates similar situation as:

Whenever there was drought, 'Umar bin Al-Khattab used to ask Allah for rain through Al-'Abbas ibn 'Abd al-Muttalib, saying, "O Allah! We used to request our Prophet to ask You for rain, and You would give us. Now we request the uncle of our Prophet to ask You for rain, so give us rain." And they would be given rain."

— Sahih al-Bukhari Book 57 Hadith 59

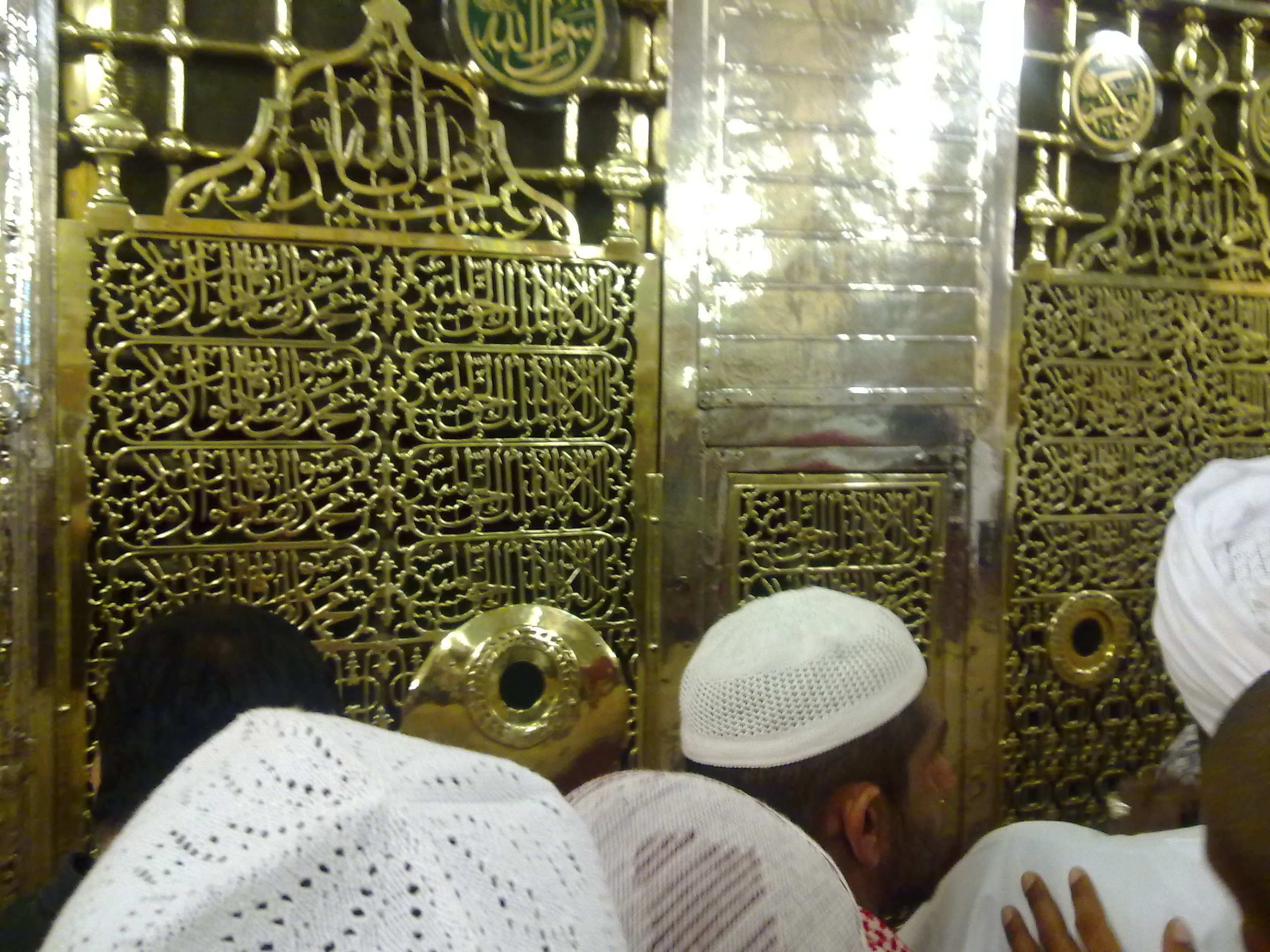
Muslims at Muhammad's grave

- Visiting the tombs of Muhammad, his companions and pious Muslims, an act they believe is supported by the Quran, Sunnah and the acts of the companions.

More than any other tomb in the Islamic world, the shrine of Muhammad is considered a source of blessings for the visitor. A hadith of the Islamic prophet Muhammad states that, "He who visits my grave will be entitled to my intercession" and in a different version "I will intercede for those who have visited me or my tomb." Visiting Muhammad's tomb after the pilgrimage is considered by the majority of Sunni legal scholars to be recommended.

The early scholars of the salaf, Ahmad Ibn Hanbal (d. 241 AH), Ishaq Ibn Rahwayh (d. 238 SH), Abd Allah ibn al-Mubarak (d. 189 AH) and Imam Shafi'i (d. 204 AH) all permitted the practice of Ziyarah to Muhammad's tomb.

According to the Hanbali scholar Al-Hasan ibn 'Ali al-Barbahari (d. 275 AH), it is also obligatory to send salutations (salam) upon Abu Bakr al-Siddiq and 'Umar ibn al-Khattab after having sent salutations upon Muhammad.

The hadith scholar Qadi Ayyad (d. 544 AH) stated that visiting Muhammad was "a sunna of the Muslims on which there was consensus, and a good and desirable deed."

Ibn Hajar al-Asqalani (d. 852 AH) explicitly stated that travelling to visit the tomb of Muhammad was "one of the best of actions and the noblest of pious deeds with which one draws near to God, and its legitimacy is a matter of consensus."

Similarly, Ibn Qudamah (d. 620 AH) considered Ziyarat of Muhammad to be recommended and also seeking intercession directly from Muhammad at his grave. Other historic scholars who recommended Ziyarah include Imam al-Ghazali (d. 505 AH), Imam Nawawi (d. 676 AH) and Muhammad al-Munawi (d. 1031 AH). The tombs of other Muslim religious figures are also respected. The son of Ahmad ibn Hanbal named Abdullah, one of the primary jurists of Sunnism, reportedly stated that he would prefer to be buried near the shrine of a saintly person than his own father.

- Group dhikr: synchronized movements of the body while chanting the names of God. Some groups, notably those in the Sufi Chishti Order, sing Qawwali; others do not use musical instruments.
- Letting the beard grow. The four schools of fiqh generally (with the exception of the Shafi and Hanbali school of fiqh) consider it unlawful to trim a beard less than a fistful length.

=== Sufi tradition ===
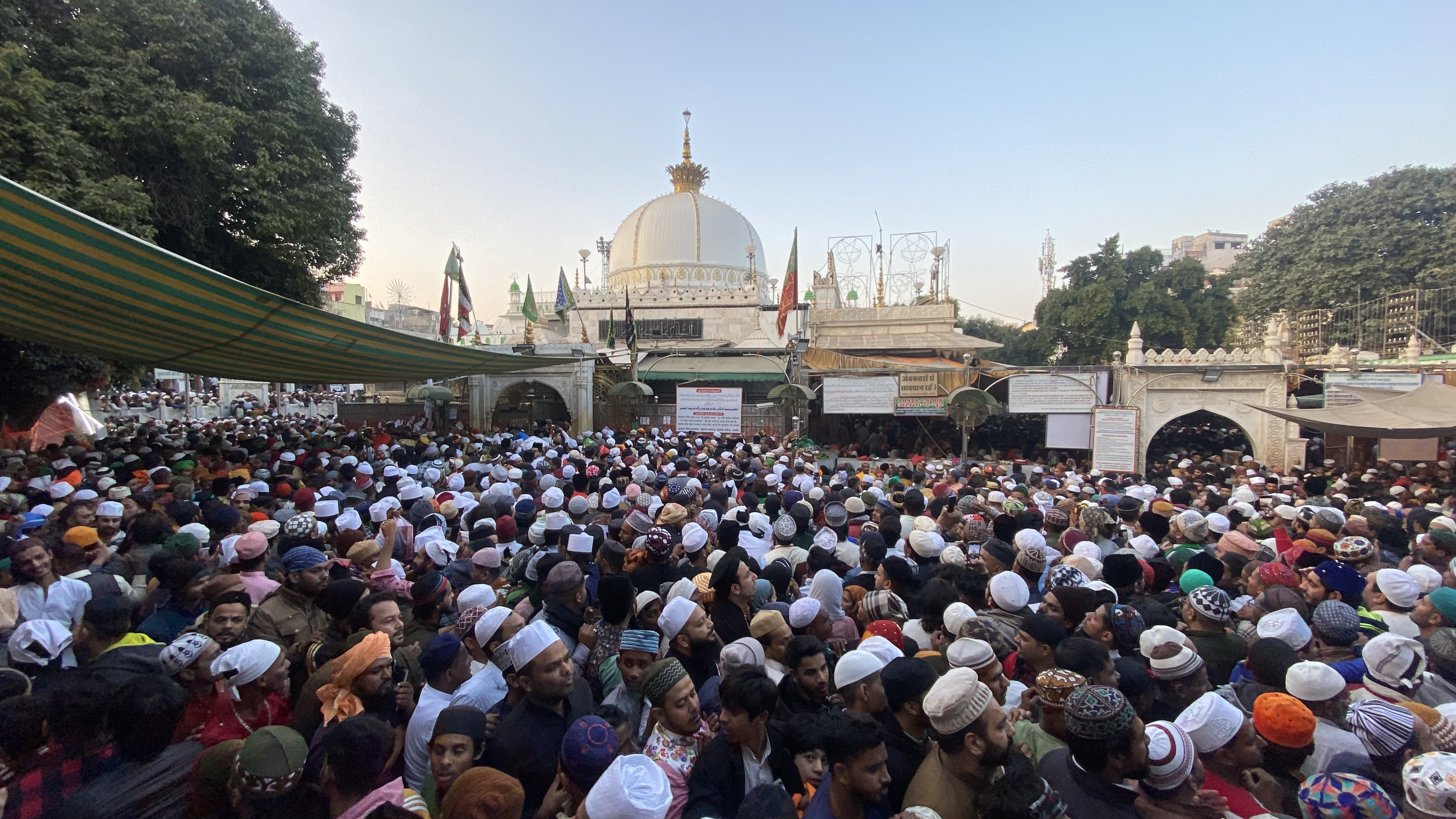
Ajmer Sharif Dargah, Khwaja Garib Nawaz Rajasthan, India

Sufism is a fundamental aspect of this movement. Imam Ahmad Raza Khan Barelvi was part of the Qadri tariqa and pledged bay'ah (allegiance) to Sayyid Shah Al ur-Rasul Marehrawi. Ahmad Raza Khan Barelvi instructed his followers in Sufi beliefs and practices. Traditional Sufi practices, such as devotion to Muhammad and the veneration of walis, remain an integral part of the movement (which defended the Sufi status quo in South Asia. They were at the forefront of defending Sufi doctrines, such as the celebration of the birth of Muhammad and tawassul.

The wider Ahle Sunnat Wal jamaat Barelvi movement was sustained and connected through thousands of Sufi Urs festivals at Dargahs/shrines in south Asia, as well as in Britain and elsewhere.

Ahmad Raza Khan Qadri and many Sunni scholars countered Deobandi, Ahl-i Hadith and Wahabi hardliners which resulted in the institutionalization of diverse Sufi movements in many countries of the world.

== Presence ==
Barelvi demographics were more than 200 million around the world in the year 2000. The Barelvi movement is spread across the globe with millions of followers, thousands of mosques, institutions and organizations in South Asia, parts of Africa and Europe, the United Kingdom and the United States.

=== India ===
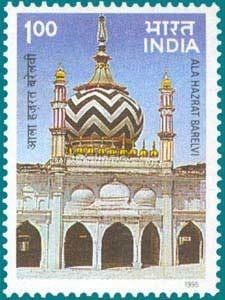
Stamp of India - 1995- Ala Hazrat Imam Ahle Sunnat

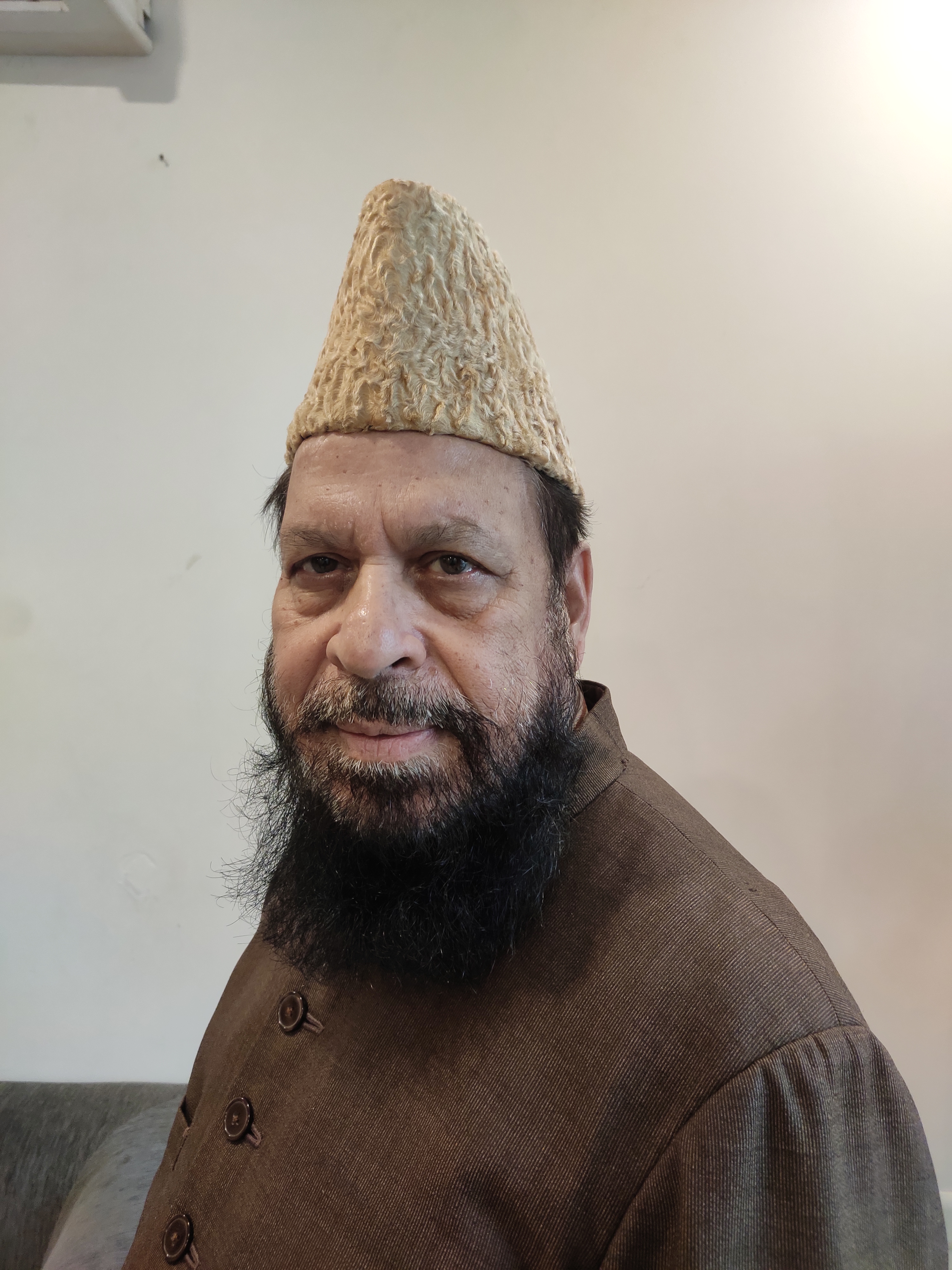
Obaidullah Khan Azmi led movement against Shahbano judgment

India Today estimated that over two-thirds of Muslims in India adhere to the Sufi-oriented Ahle Sunnat (Barelvi) movement.

==== Bareilly Sharif Dargah ====
Markaz-e-Ahle Sunnah at Dargah Ala Hazrat is one of the main centers of Ahle Sunnat Wal Jamaat movement in south Asia. Millions of people turned to seek guidance in Islamic matters towards this center of Islamic learning. Bareilly city has been the heart-throb of Sunni Muslims since 1870 when revered Islamic Scholar Ala Hazrat Imam Ahmed Raza Khan established Fatwa committee under the guidance of his father Naqi Ali Khan. Later, his son Maulana Hamid Raza Khan and Mufti Azam-e-Hind Mustafa Raza Khan continued Fatwa work.

==== Stand against the forced sterilization actions of the government ====
In the mid-70s, during The Emergency (India), on the advice of Sanjay Gandhi, son of Prime Minister Indira Gandhi, the Indian government tried to force men to undergo vasectomies (Nasbandi). Huge but unconfirmed numbers of young men were forcibly sterilized. Government officials, and even school teachers, were ordered to induce a predetermined number of males to endure vasectomies or Nasbandi, as they were called. Indian Muslims were finding it difficult to oppose this harsh government action because at the time, it was the emergency and the powers were totally in the hands of Prime Minister Mufti-e-Azam Mustafa Raza Khan. At that time, he acted without pressure and passed a verdict in which he banned vasectomies, declaring them un-Islamic. He published his judicial verdict and circulated it all over India, giving Muslims a sigh of relief but triggering tension between Muslims and the Indian government. The government unsuccessfully tried to get the Fatwa withdrawn and within two years, Indira Gandhi lost the Parliamentary elections.

==== Shah Bano Case Movement ====
Indian Supreme Court in case of Mohd. Ahmed Khan v. Shah Bano Begum delivered a judgment favouring maintenance given to an aggrieved divorced Muslim woman. Maulana Obaidullah Khan Azmi, Allama Yaseen Akhtar Misbahi and some other Sunni leaders started movement against the judgment. In 1985, Misbahi was elected as the vice president of the All India Muslim Personal Law Board, where he advocated for the protection of Shariat. They led various mass protests in various parts of the country specially in Mumbai. Speeches of Obaidullah Khan Azmi were widely circulated and he had become a most sought after speaker for anti-Shah Bano case meetings in Mumbai. Mumbai police filed case against the Maulana and expelled him from Mumbai declaring his speeches inflammatory. Then, the government under pressure enacted a law with given the right to maintenance for the period of iddat after the divorce, and shifting the onus of maintaining her to her relatives or the Waqf Board.

==== Scholars, Organizations and Institutions ====
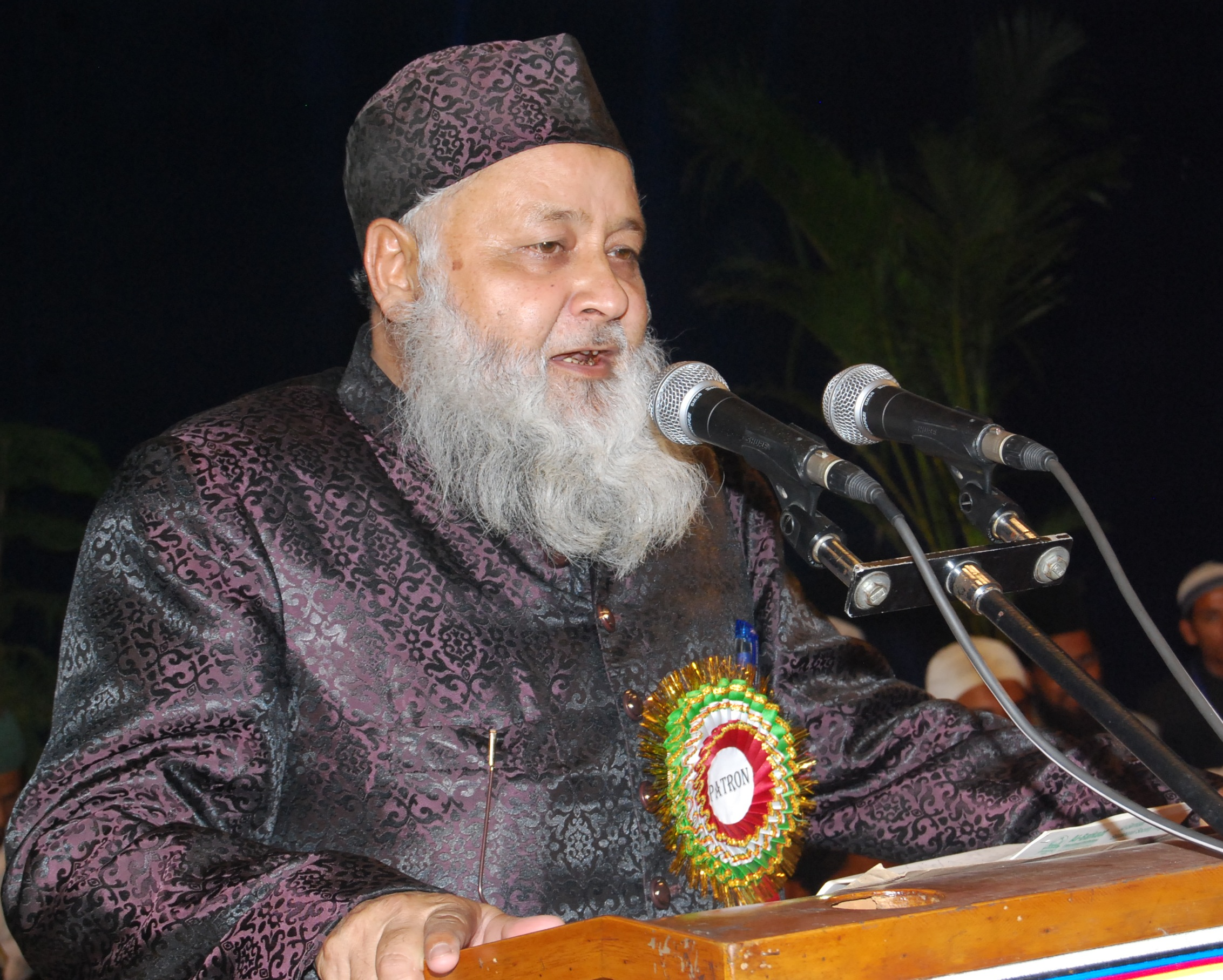
Syed Ameen Mian Qaudri

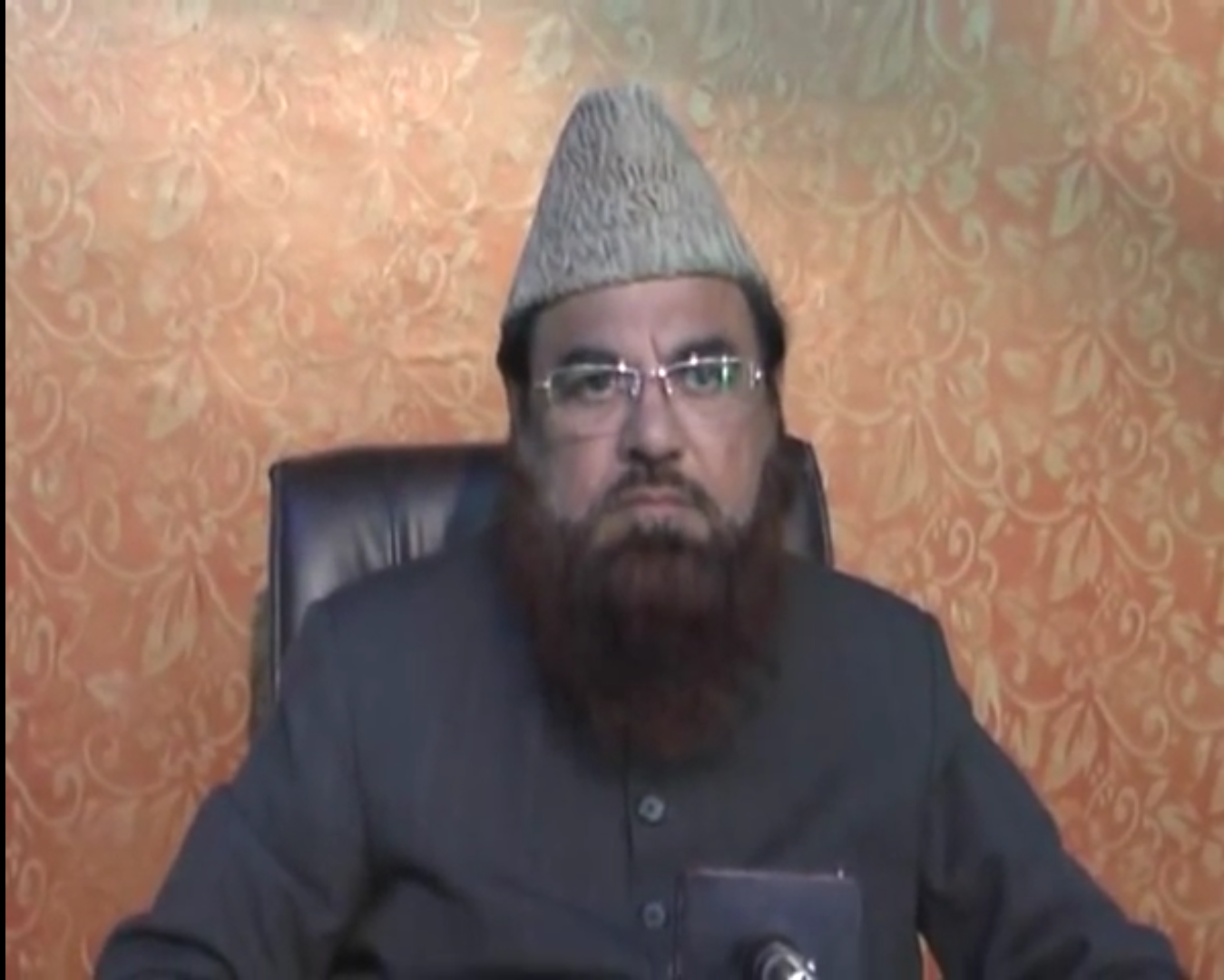
Mufti Mukarram Ahmad Shahi Imam of Fatehpuri Mosque, Delhi

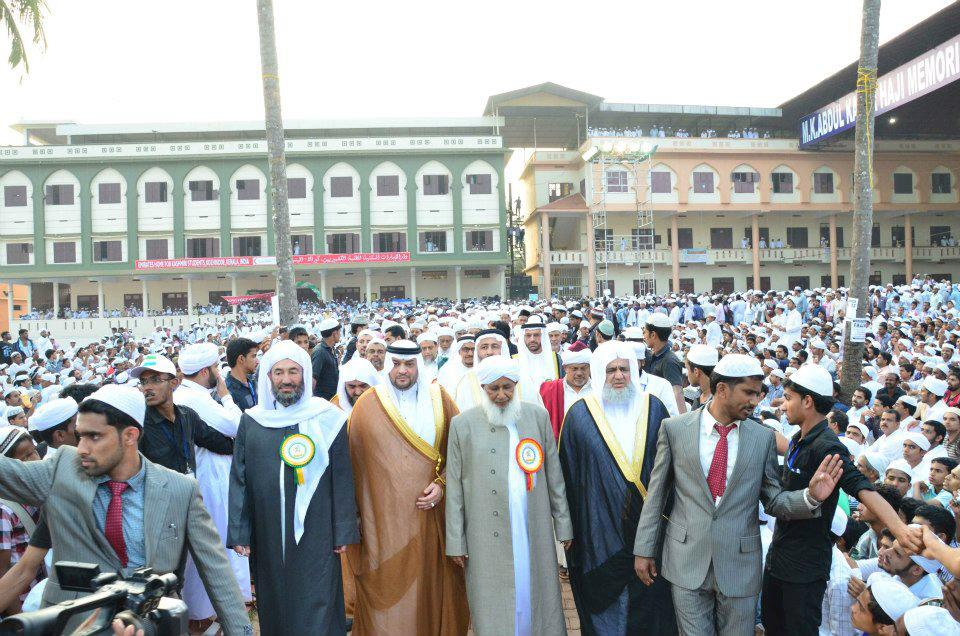
Arab World Scholars in Kerala, India during Sunni Markaz Conference in 2013

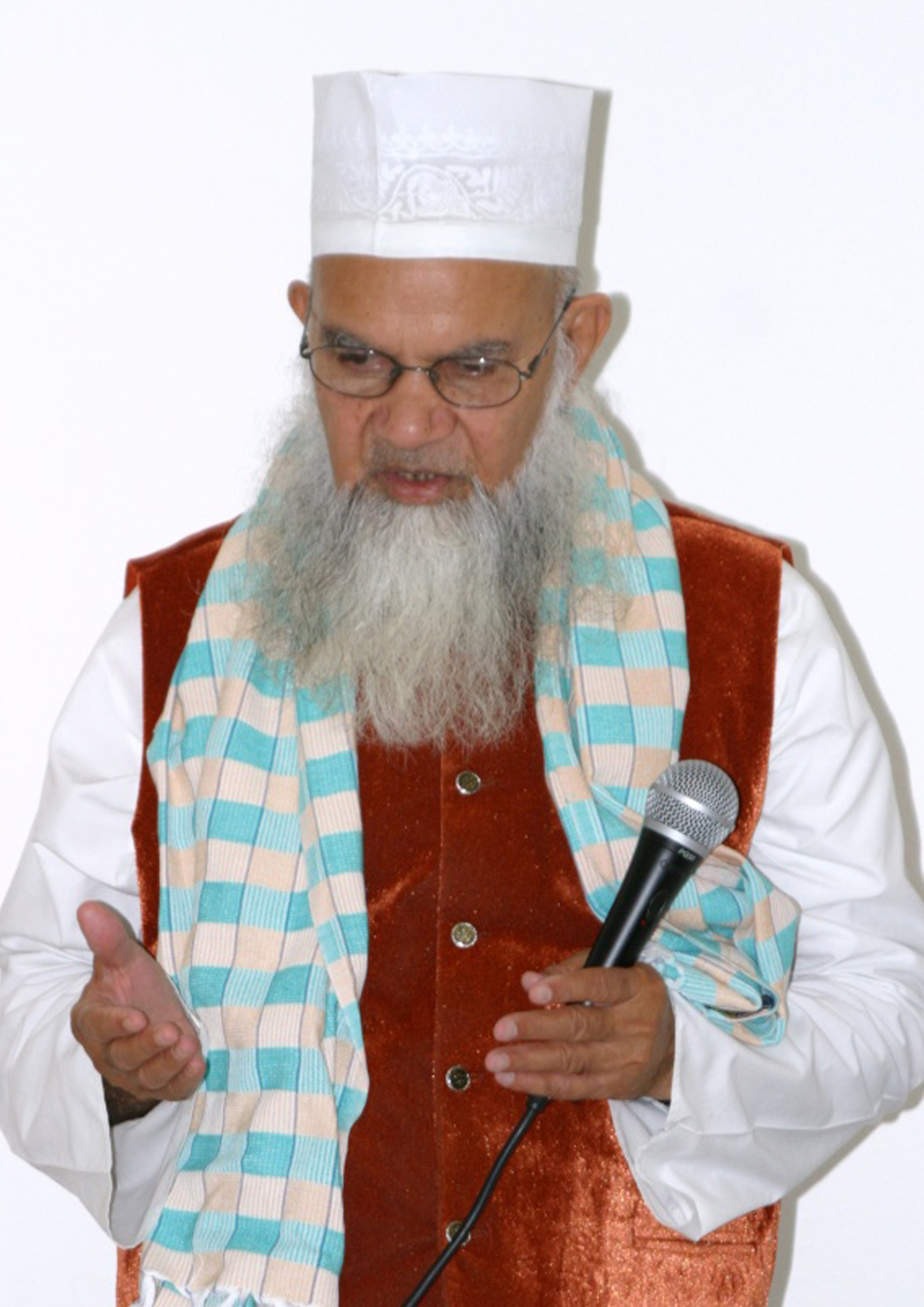
Huzur Shaikhul Islam Syed Mohammed Madni Ashraf

At present chief of dargah Ala Hazrat Subhan Raza Khan, chief Qazi Asjad Raza Khan, Ziaul Mustafa Razvi Qadri, Muhammad Madni Ashraf Ashrafi Al-Jilani, Syed Ameen Mian Qaudri of Barkatiya Sufi chain, Shaikh Aboobacker Ahmad of All India Sunni Jamiatul Ulma, Sayyid Ibraheem Khaleel Al Bukhari, Abdul Rashid Dawoodi and Mufti Mukarram Ahmad of Royal Mosque Fatehpuri Masjid Delhi are some of the influential Sunni leaders of India. Bareilly based All India Jama'at Raza-e-Mustafa, Raza Academy, Mumbai and Kerala based All India Sunni Jamiyyathul Ulama are influential bodies. Idara-e-Shariah(Shara'ai Council) is highest body in Bihar, Jharkhand and Orrissa. All India Ulema and Mashaikh Board and All India Tanzeem Ulama-e-Islam also works among Sunnis.

The Grand Mufti of India is the senior and influential religious authority of the Islamic Community of India. The incumbent is Shafi Sunni scholar Sheikh Abubakr Ahmad, general secretary of All India Sunni Jamiyyathul Ulama, who was conferred the title in February 2019 at the Ghareeb Nawaz Peace Conference held at Ramlila Maidan, New Delhi, organised by the All India Tanzeem Ulama-e-Islam.

Jamia Nizamia, Hyderabad

For Islamic missionary activities, Sunni Dawate Islami (SDI) is an important Islamic preaching movement in India. It is working in at least 20 countries around the world. Muhammad Shakir Ali Noori founded the movement in Mumbai. It has a large network of (Dawah workers) preachers in India and in other countries. Sunni Dawat-e-Islami has established many modern and religious educational institutions around India and some in other parts of the world.

It holds an annual conference International Sunni Ijtema in Mumbai, which is said to be attended by between 150,000 and 300,000 people; the first day (Friday) is reserved for women. Followers of Sunni Dawate Islami wear white turbans.

In 2008, SDI had a European headquarters at Noor Hall in Preston, England, and centres in some other English towns, including: Blackburn, Bolton, Leicester and Manchester. SDI also had a North American headquarters in Chicago. By 2008, SDI had founded 12 madrasas in India. In 2020, SDI says that in India it manages 50 madrasas and 15 schools that teach in English. SDI says it has an educational centre in Bolton (England), and an educational centre in Mauritius.

==== Network of madrasas ====
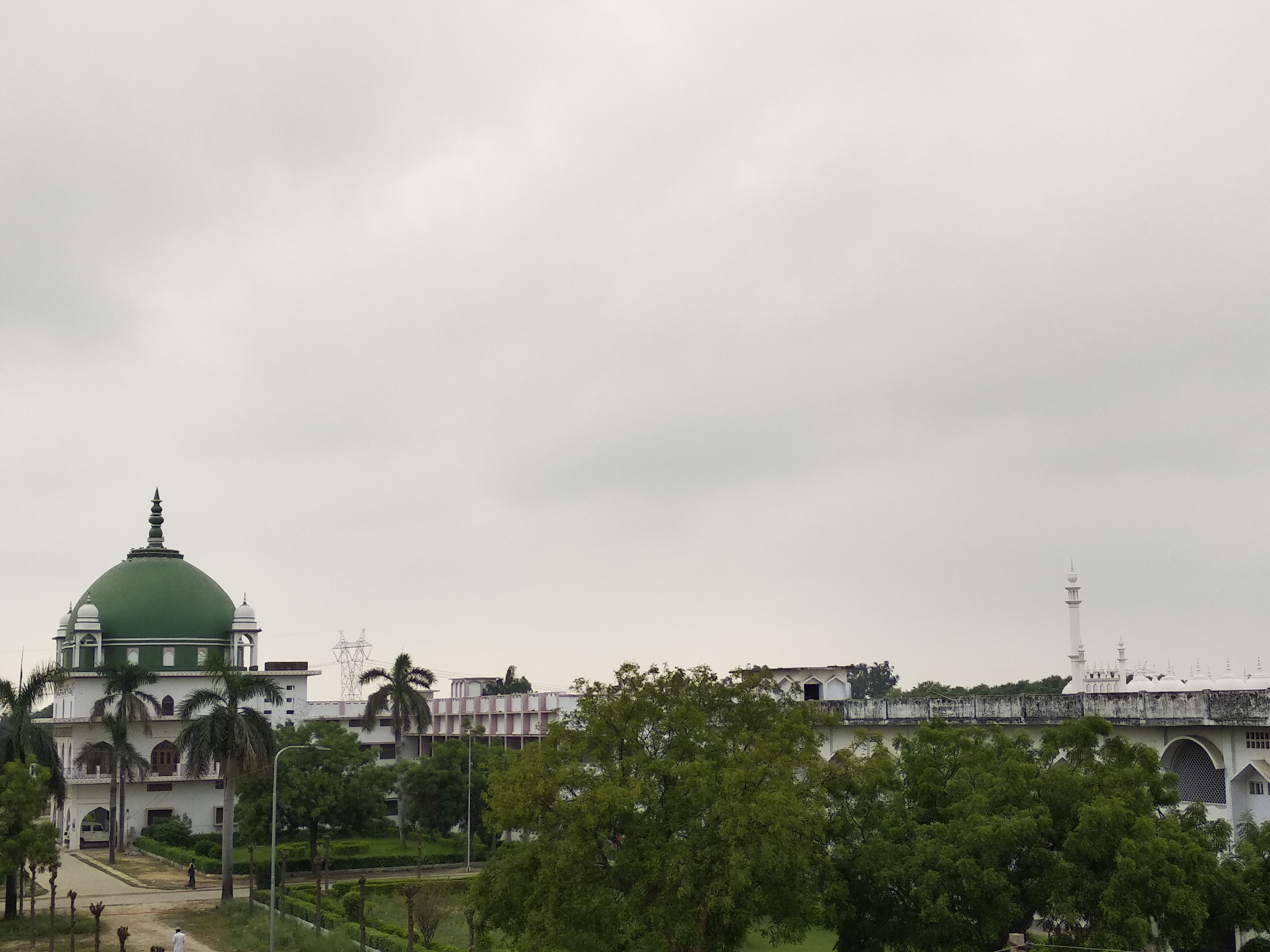
Al Jamiatul Ashrafia, Mubarakpur, Azamgarh

Al Jamiatul Ashrafia, Azamgarh, Jamia Naeemia Moradabad, Jamia Amjadia Rizvia, Ghosi Al-Jame-atul-Islamia, Mau, Markazu Saquafathi Sunniyya, Ma'din, Jamia Saadiya Kerala and Jamia Nizamia, Hyderabad are some of the movement's most notable institutions. Markazu Saquafathi Sunniyya or Jamia Markaz operates more than 50 institutions and it also operates many sub-centers across the world. Al Jamiatul Ashrafia is considered the main institution of learning in northern India and it is attended by thousands of students who come from different parts of the country.

=== Pakistan ===
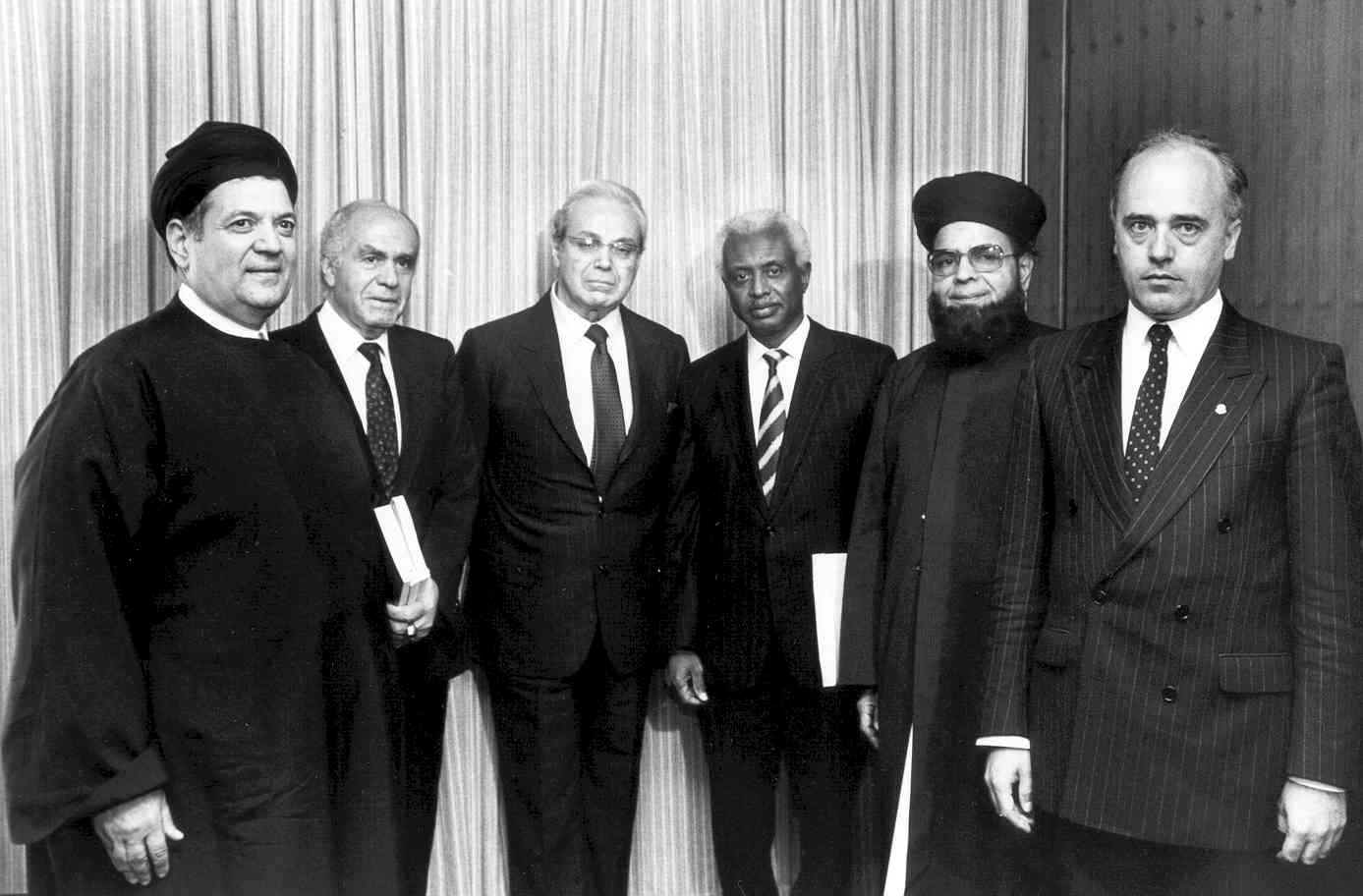
Shah Ahmad Noorani Siddiqui, (JUP) Pakistan (second from right) led an international peace delegation to UN Secretary-General Javier Pérez de Cuéllar (third from left) for an end to the Iran–Iraq War:(New York, 16 June 1988)

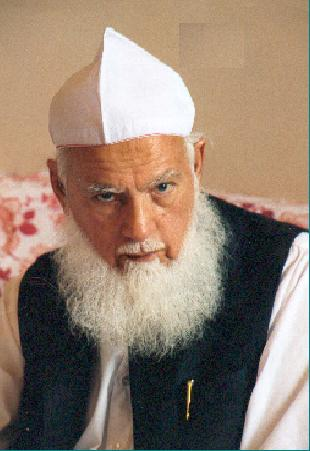
Justice Shaykh Karam Shah Al Azhari, author of Exegesis of the Quran Tafsir Zia ul Quran

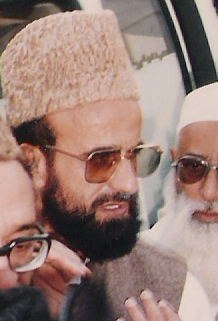
Grand Mufti Muneeb-ur-Rehman president of Tanzeem ul Madaris Ahle Sunnat and Jamia Naeemia Lahore with Hanif Tayyab

Sufism has strong links to South Asia dating back to the eighth and ninth centuries and preaches religious tolerance, encourages spiritual over ritualistic practicing of Islam, and encourages diversity. The Ahle Sunnat Barelvi movement has originated from South Asian Sufism itself. The religious and political leaders of this movement were followers of Sufism and lead the masses in to revivalist Sunni movement.

Time and The Washington Post gave assessments that vast majority of Muslims in Pakistan follow Ahle Sunnat Barelvi movement. Political scientist Rohan Bedi estimated that 60% of Pakistani Muslims follow this movement. The movement form a majority in the most populous state Punjab, Sindh and Azad Kashmir regions of Pakistan.

In the aftermath of the 1948 Partition, they formed an association to represent the movement in Pakistan, called Jamiat Ulema-e-Pakistan (JUP). The ulema have advocated application of sharia law across the country.

They are largest Muslim sect in Pakistan and have several organizations and parties which are Dawat e Islami International, Tanzeem ul Madaris Ahle Sunnat, Jamiat Ulema-e-Pakistan, Sunni Tehreek (ST), Jamaat Ahle Sunnat,Pakistan Awami Tehreek (PAT), Sunni Ittehad Council, Tehreek Labaik Ya Rasool Allah (TLYR) and Majlis-e-Tahaffuz-e-Khatme Nabuwwat are some of the leading organisations of Pakistani Sunni Muslims.

Jamia Nizamia Ghousia, Jamia Naeemia Lahore and Dar-ul-Madinah Schools are some of the leading seminaries of this movement.

==== Finality of Prophethood movement ====
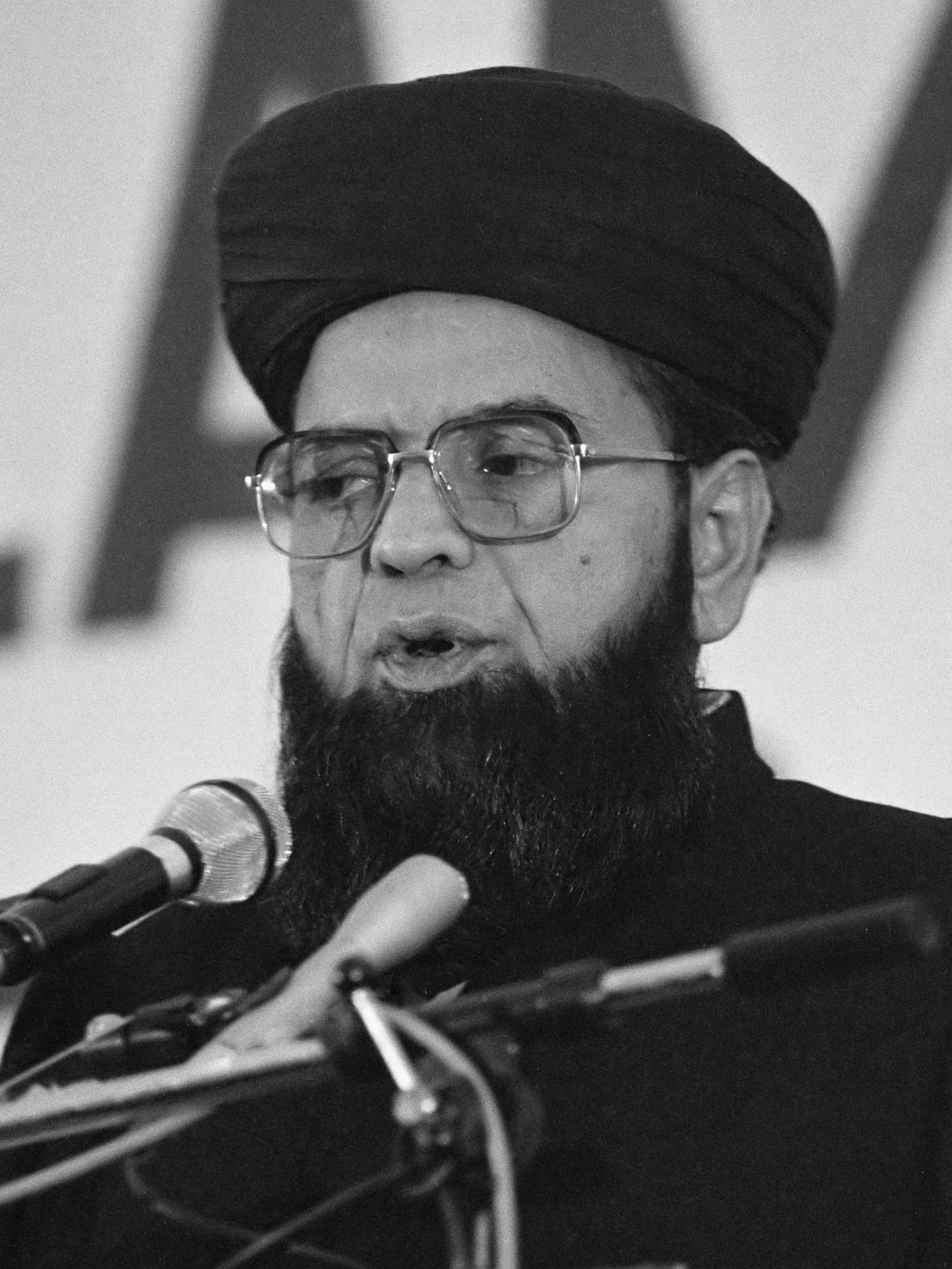
Ahmad Noorani Siddiqi (1985)

In 1950, scholars of Ahle Sunnat Barelvi movement initiated a sub-movement named, 'Majlis-e-Tahaffuz-e-Khatme Nabuwwat' the history of which can be traced back to the 1880s when Mirza Ghulam Ahmad of Qadian proclaimed himself to be a prophet in Islam. This proclamation of Mirza Ghulam Ahmad was against the tenets of Islam and created a schism in the Muslim community. Therefore, with the aim to protect the belief in the finality of prophethood of Muhammad based on their concept of Khatam an-Nabiyyin. The movement launched countrywide campaigns and protests to declare Ahmadis as non-Muslims. Mohammad Abdul Ghafoor Hazarvi Zafar Ali Khan, Abdul Hamid Qadri Badayuni, Khwaja Qamar ul Din Sialvi, Syed Faiz-ul Hassan Shah, Ahmad Saeed Kazmi, Abdul Sattar Khan Niazi, Pir of Manki Sharif Amin ul-Hasanat, Muhammad Karam Shah al-Azhari, Sardar Ahmad Qadri and Muhammad Hussain Naeemi were the leaders of the movement.

Scholars of various schools of thought under the leadership of Shah Ahmad Noorani Siddiqui, who was president of Jamiat Ulema-e-Pakistan initiated a successful campaign against the Ahmadis and compelled the National Assembly to declare Ahmadis as non-Muslims. And such a clause was inserted in the 1973 Constitution of Pakistan by Second Amendment to the Constitution of Pakistan. After meeting the first agenda, Khatme-Nabuwat started the next phase of their campaign – to bar Ahmadis from using the title of Muslim. The then president General Muhammad Zia-ul-Haq passed an ordinance in 1984 amending the Pakistan Penal Code (PPC) commonly known as Ordinance XX. Sunni leaders Shaikh ul Quran Allama Ghulam Ali Okarvi, Muhammad Shafee Okarvi, Syed Shujaat Ali Qadri, Iftikharul Hasan Shah and Khalid Hasan Shah were the main leaders of this sub-movement.

==== Madarsa Network in Pakistan ====
Tanzeem-ul-Madaris Ahl-e-Sunnat ASJ education board is the central organisation to register Ahle Sunnat Barelvi Madarsas. The board follows Sunni Barelvi ideology and is opponent of the Wahabi doctrine.

As per Islam online, around 10,000 madrassas are managed by Tanzeem-ul-Madaris Pakistan. Tahzibul Akhbar in its report on the educational services of Religious institutions has estimated that Tanzeem has 3000 institutions in Khyber Pakhtunwa and 1000 in the area of Hazara.

Muhammad Ramzan, in his report on Madarsas has stated that Tanzeem has most has maximum 5584 Madarsas in Punjab state in comparison to others. 'In Lahore 336, Sheikhupura 336, Gujranwala 633, Rawalpindi 387, Faisalabad 675, Sargodha 461, Multan 944, Sahiwal 458, D.G.Khan 605, Bahawalpur 749 madarsa are affiliated with the Tanzeem'. According to Rizwan, 'the Madarsas of Tanzeem are rarely involved in militancy which is maximum in Deobandis. In population, Barelvis or traditional Sunnis outnumber all other sects combined. They are about 53.4% of total population of the province'.

==== Stand on blasphemy laws ====
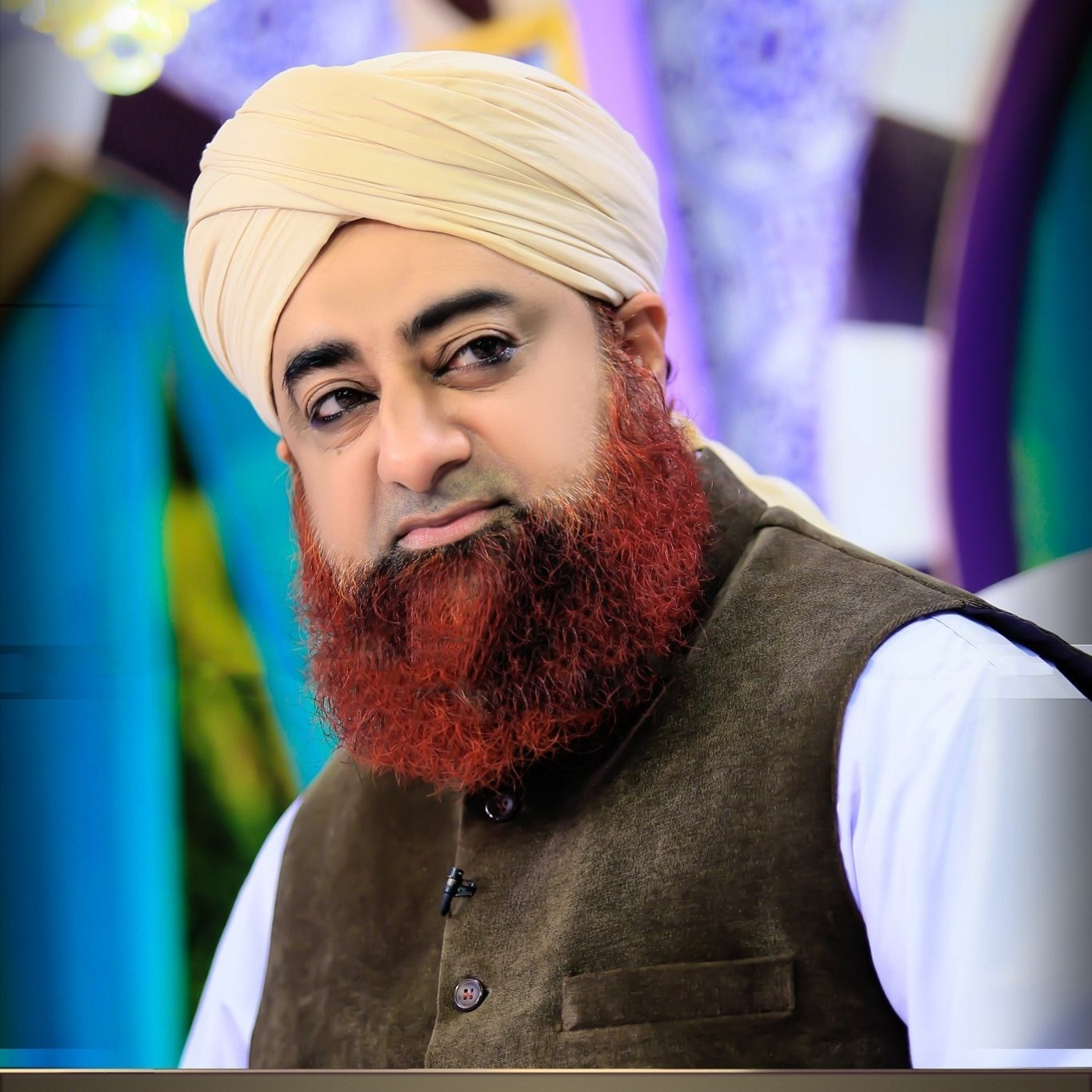
Mufti Muhammad Akmal Madani Qadri

The movement has opposed any change in the Pakistani blasphemy laws. They have always uphold the blasphemy as highest crime and endorsed the strict punishment for blasphemers. Punjab governor Salman Taseer was assassinated on 4 January 2011 by Mumtaz Qadri, a member of the Barelvi group Dawat-e-Islami, due to Taseer's opposition to Pakistan's blasphemy laws. Over five hundred scholars supported Qadri and a boycott of Taseer's funeral.

==== Persecution ====
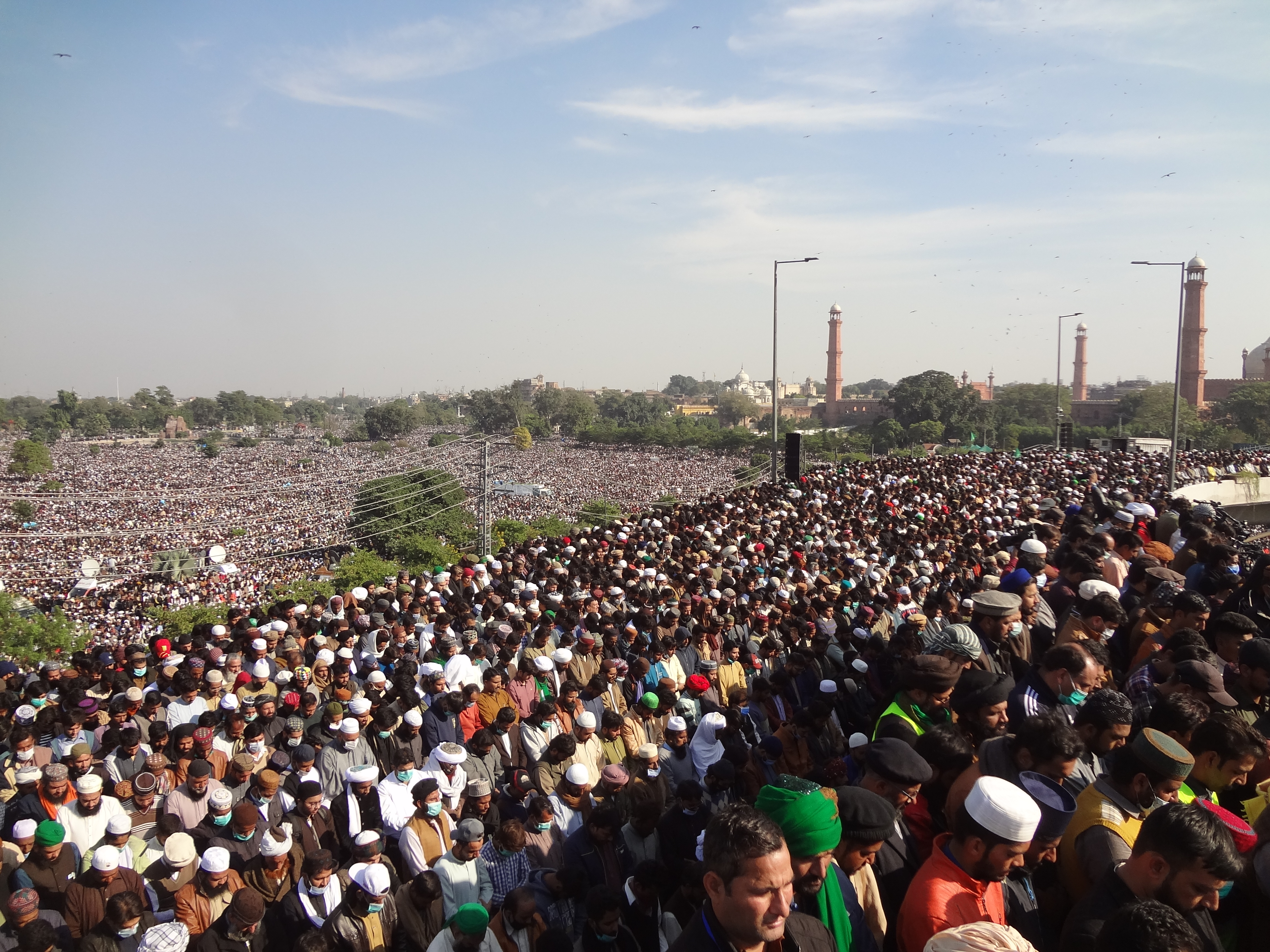
Funeral Khadim Hussain Rizvi

They have been targeted and killed by radical Deobandi groups in Pakistan such as the TTP, SSP, LeJ, etc. Suicide attacks, vandalism and destruction of sites considered holy to those in the Sunni Barelvi movement have been perpetrated by Deobandi extremist groups. This includes attacks, destruction and vandalism of Sufi Data Darbar in Lahore, Abdullah Shah Ghazi's tomb in Karachi, Khal Magasi in Balochistan, and Rahman Baba's tomb in Peshawar. The murder of various Barelvi leaders have also been committed by Deobandi terrorists. The clerics claim that there is a bias against them by various Pakistani establishments such as the DHA, who tend to appoint Deobandi Imams for mosques in their housing complexes rather than Barelvi ones. Historical landmarks such as Badshahi Masjid also have Deobandi Imams, which is a fact that has been used as evidence by Barelvi clerics for bias against Barelvis in Pakistan. The Milade Mustafa Welfare Society has asserted that the Religious Affairs Department of DHA interferes with Human Resources to ensure that Deobandi Imams are selected for mosques in their housing complex.

During the 1990s and 2000s, sporadic violence resulted from disputes between Barelvis and Deobandis over control of Pakistani mosques. The conflict came to a head in May 2001, when sectarian riots broke out after the assassination of Sunni Tehreek leader Saleem Qadri. In April 2006 in Karachi, a bomb attack on a Barelvi gathering celebrating Muhammad's birthday killed 57 people, including several Sunni Tehreek leaders. Militants believed to be affiliated with the Taliban and Sipah-e-Sahaba attacked Barelvis celebrating Mawlid in Faisalabad and Dera Ismail Khan on 27 February 2010, sparking tensions between the groups.

In 2021, the Pakistani government officially banned the Tehreek-e-Labbaik Pakistan and is severely cracking down on Sunni Muslim political voices of the Barelvi movement. Deobandi political parties like Jamiat Ulema-e-Islam (F), however, are still freely operating and even supported by elements within the Pakistani government.

=== Bangladesh ===
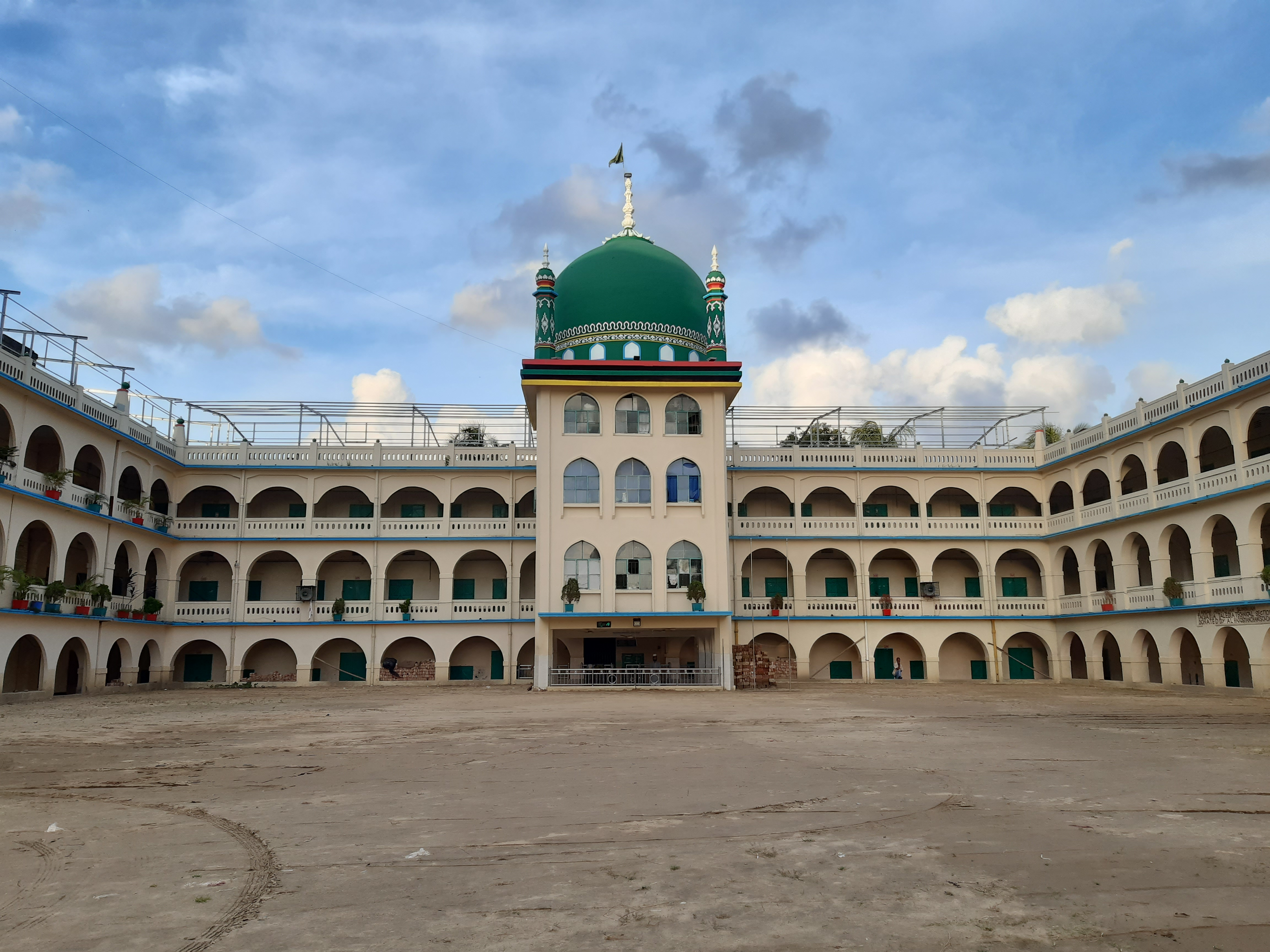
Jamea Ahmadia Sunnia Alia

Barelvis form a sizeable portion of the Hanafi communities in Bangladesh. It identifies under the banner of Ahl-e-Sunnat Wal Jama'at (ASWJ) along with other Sufi groups which have strong bases in Dhaka, Chittagong and Sylhet such as the Maizbhandaria, and this serves as a central organization for the Barelvi ulema in Bangladesh.

A majority of Bangladeshi Muslims perceive Sufis as a source of spiritual wisdom and guidance and their Khanqahs and Dargahs as nerve centers of Muslim society and large number of Bangladeshi Muslims identify themselves with a Sufi order, almost half of whom adhere to the Chishti order that became popular during the Mughal times, although the earliest Sufis in Bengal, such as Shah Jalal, belonged to the Suhrawardiyya order, whose global center is still Maner Sharif in Bihar. During the Sultanate period, Sufis emerged and formed khanqahs and dargahs that served as the nerve center of local communities.

World Sunni Movement led by Syed Mohammad Saifur Rahman is one of the main organisation of the movement which opposes Wahabi ideologies. Beside Bangladesh, WSM is active in various European and Gulf countries. Bangladesh Islami Front and its students wing Bangladesh Islami Chattra Sena have worked to protect the faith and belief of Sunni Sufis in the country and took stands against Deobandi Hefazat-e-Islam Bangladesh and Khelafat Majlish. Jamia Ahmadiyya Sunnia Kamil Madrasa is a notable institution following ideology of Ahle Sunnat wal Jamaat or Maslak-e-Aala Hazrat.

=== United Kingdom ===
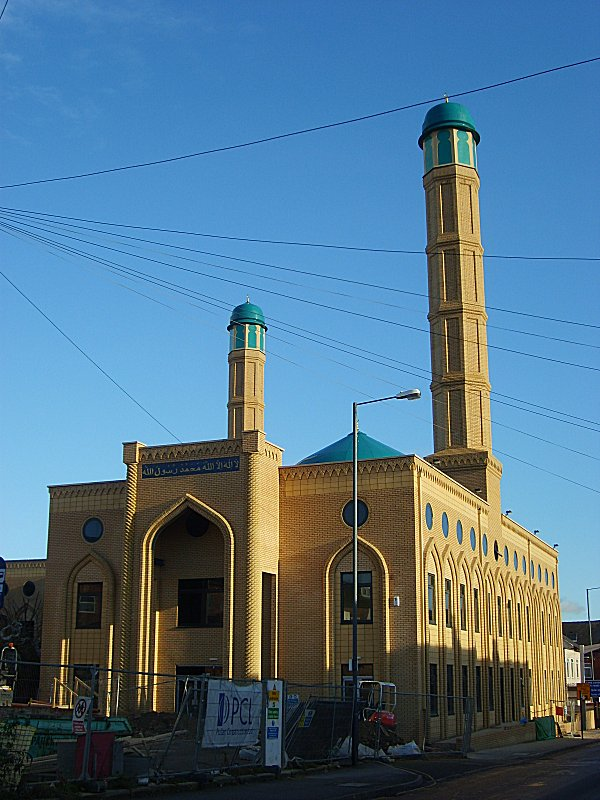
Madina Mosque (Sheffield)

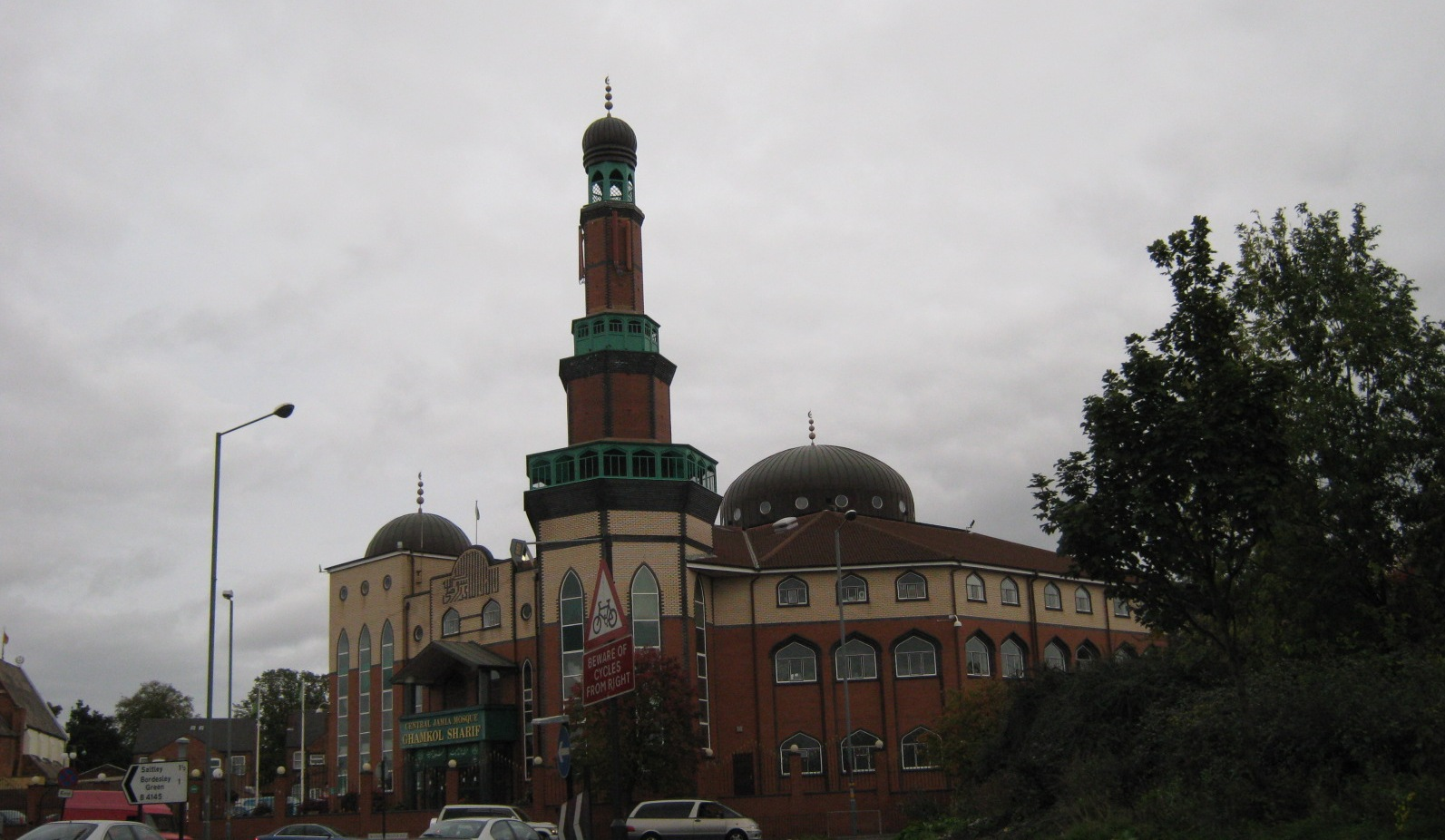
Central Jamia Mosque, Ghamkol Sharif, Birmingham

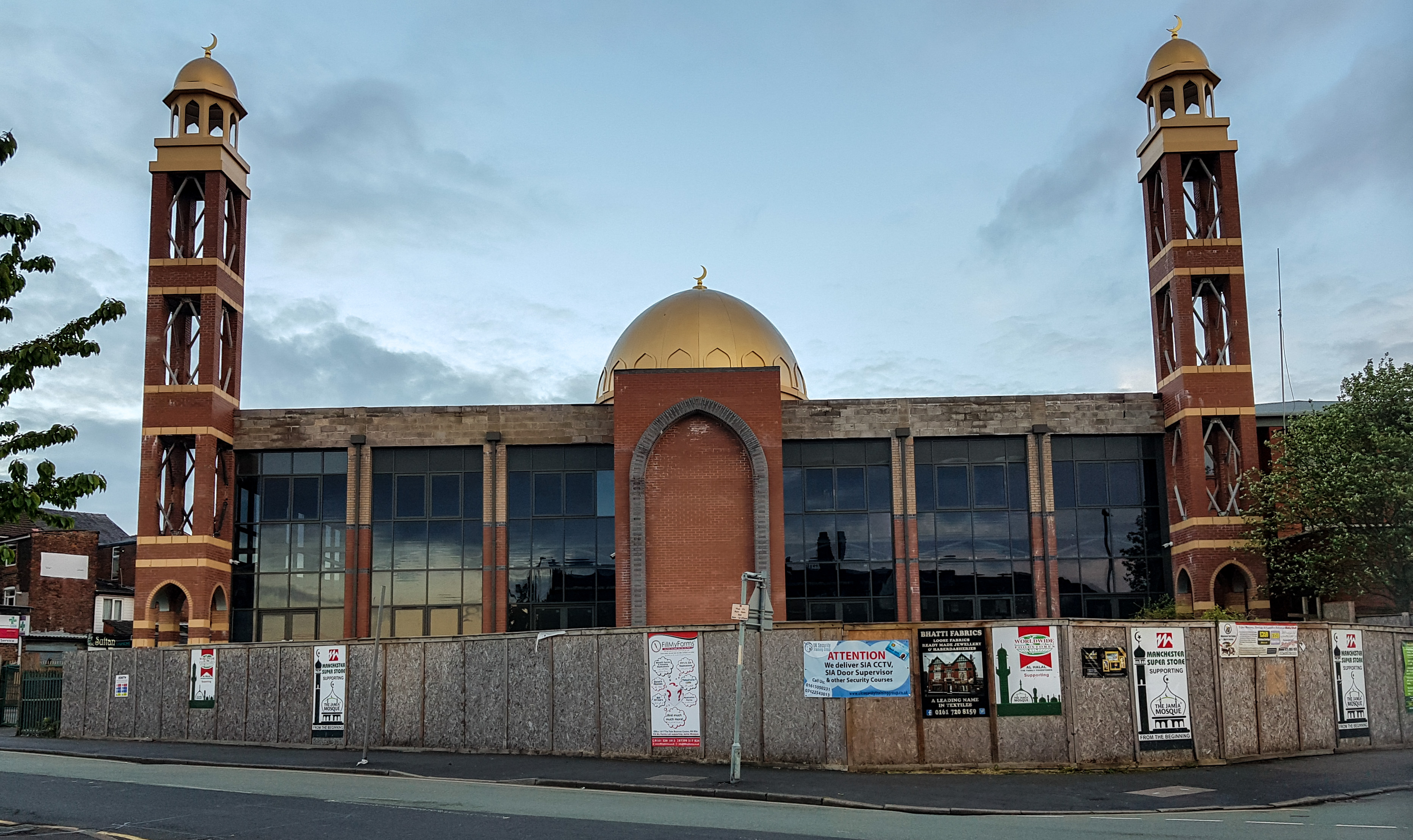
North Manchester Jamia Mosque

Muhammad Imdad Hussain Pirzada

According to Irfan Al Alawi, 'The Sufism influenced Ahle Sunnat Barelvi in United Kingdom immigrated to Britain earlier than the Deobandis, established the main mosques in Britain. They integrated into UK society and are considered law abiding.' moderate majority, peaceful and pious.

In 2011, the Ahle Sunnat Barelvi movement had most of the British mosques. The majority of people in the United Kingdom of Pakistani and Kashmir origin are descended from immigrants from Sunni Barelvi-majority areas.

In Manchester, by 2014, Ahle Sunnat Barelvi was the largest denomination in terms of the number of mosques and population. The majority of Birmingham Muslims are adherent to the Ahle Sunnat barelvi movement. The movement in Pakistan has received funding from their counterparts in the UK, in part as a reaction to rival movements in Pakistan also receiving funding from abroad. According to an editorial in the English-language Pakistani newspaper The Daily Times, many of these mosques have been however usurped by Saudi-funded radical organizations.

The Ahle Sunnat Barelvi movement formed British Muslim Forum (BMF) and the Sufi Muslim Council (SMC) in 2005 and 2006, respectively to represent themselves at the national level. In 2017, the movement had around 538 mosques in the United Kingdom along with their fellow Sufi organisations which are second largest in terms of number. Pir Maroof Shah Qadri has built a number of mosques in Bradford.

Allama Arshadul Qaudri along with Peer Maroof Qadri established World Islamic Mission (WIM) in 1973 at Makkah and became the leader of WIM in England. He worked in the United Kingdom to strengthen the movement of Ahle Sunna wal Jam'aat. Qadri through this movement shaped spirituality based Islam in Europe. Sufi Abdullah a Sunni Sufi scholar, also established a strong Ahle Sunnat foundation in the Bradford.

Allama Qamaruzzaman Azmi who is present General Secretary of World Islamic Mission worked for five decades in several parts of Europe and U.K to establish several mosques and institutions with his support and supervision. In Bradford, Azmi help established Islamic Missionary College (IMC) Bradford. In Manchester he established, North Manchester Jamia Mosque and in Birmingham, Ghamkol Shariff Masjid. His continuous Dawah work helped Southerland Mosque become of Sunni Barelvi.

International Sunni organization Dawat-e-Islami has at least 38 Centers in the United Kingdom.

Muhammad Imdad Hussain Pirzada, a leading scholar of Islam and commentator of Quran, has established Darul Uloom Jamia Al-Karam in 1985, an Islamic institute which has produced over 400 British Islamic scholars. He is also president of Muslim Charity and British Muslim Forum.

=== South Africa ===
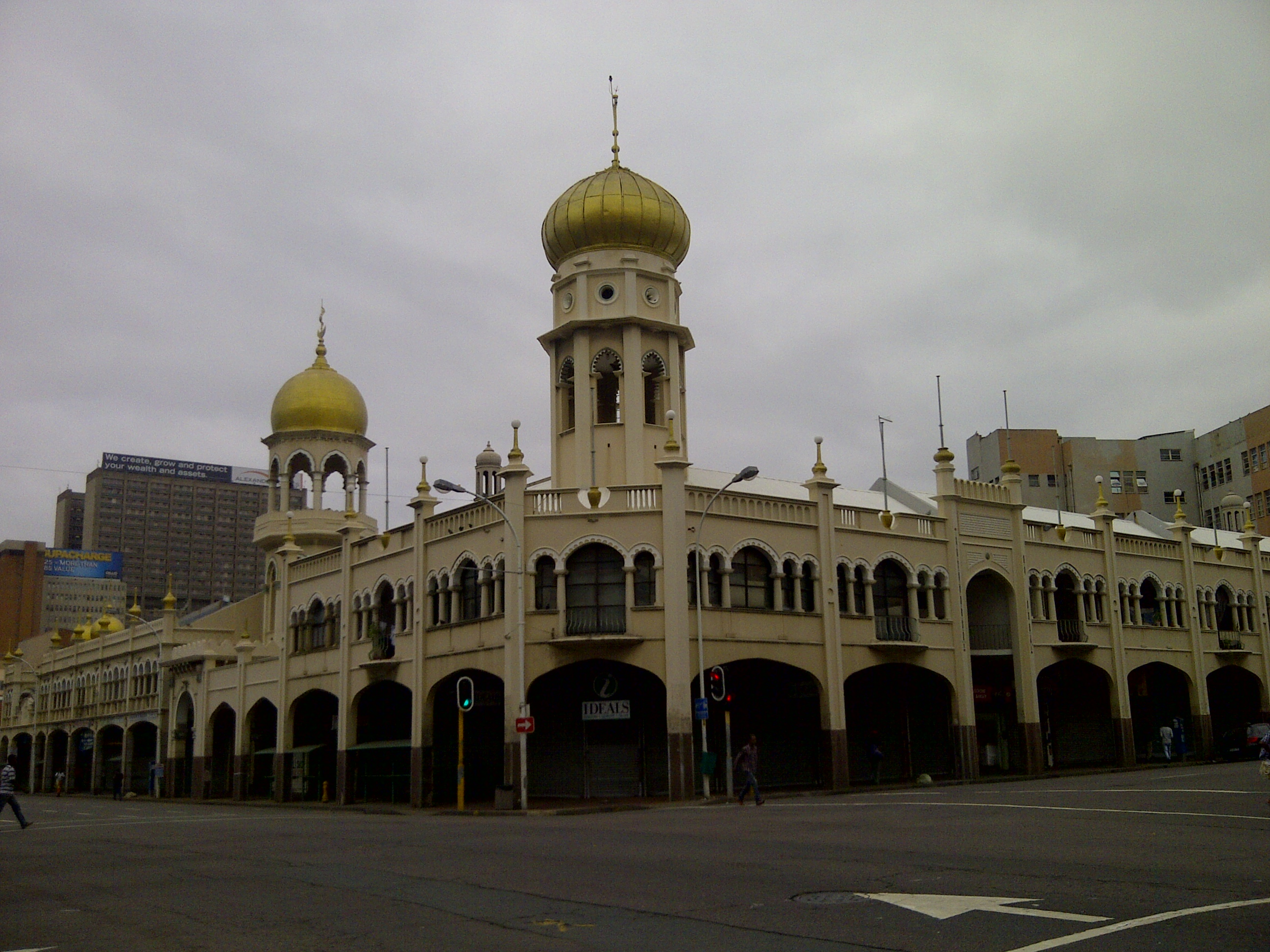
Grey Street Masjid (Grey & Queen Street) Durban, South Africa

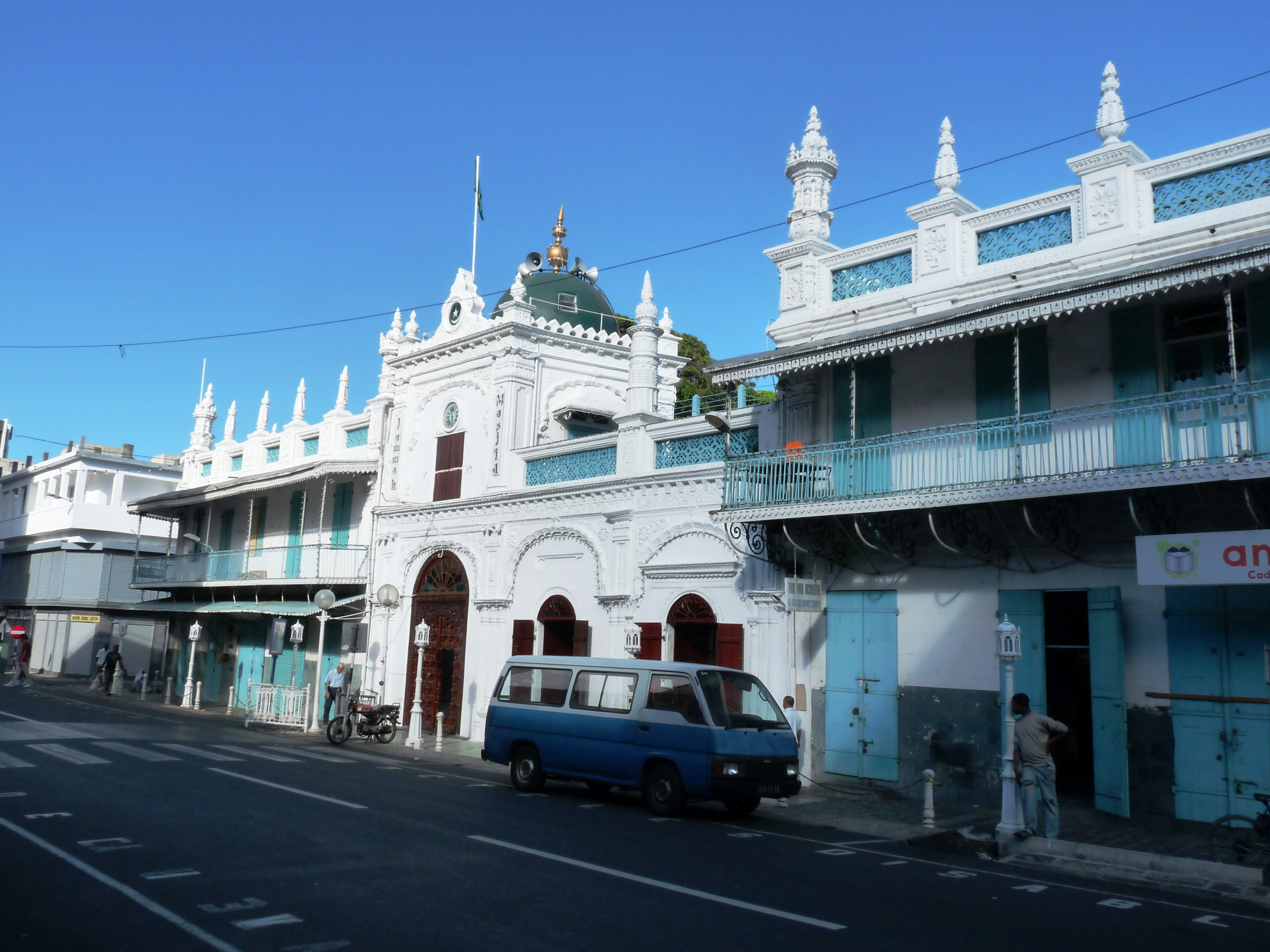
Juma Masjid, Port Louis

The Ahle Sunnat movement has presence in various cities and town of South Africa where they have build network of Madarsas and Mosques. In South Africa debate with Tablighi Jama'at was called as Sunni-Tablighi controversy. The movement is represented by Sunni Jamiatul Ulema (SJU) which was founded in 1979. It was established to address the various social, welfare, educational and spiritual needs of the community and to preserve and to promote the teachings of the Ahle Sunnah wal Jamaah.

The Imam Ahmed Raza Academy is a seminary and non-governmental organisation and a publishing house based in Durban, South Africa. It was established on 5 July 1986 by Sheikh Abdul Hadi Al-Qaadiri Barakaati, a graduate of Darul Uloom Manzar-e-Islam, Bareilly Shareef, India. The objective is to propagate Islam in South Africa.

Darul Uloom Aleemiyah Razvia was established in 1983 and on 12 January '1990, Mufti Muhammad Akbar Hazarvi established Darul Uloom Pretoria. Darul Uloom Qadaria Ghareeb Nawaz (New Castle) is one of the leading Madarsa of the mission which was founded in 1997 at uMnambithi (formerly Ladysmith) by Maulana Syed Muhammad Aleemuddin. Jamia Imam Ahmed Raza Ahsanul Barkaat was established in 2007. All these institutions have focused more on defending Sufi beliefs from Deobandis. Debates and Munazaras are common features of these institutions

In Durban, the movement run Durban's largest mosque, the Juma Mosque which is also known as Grey Street mosque. The Sunni community celebrates Mawlid un Nabi and observes anniversaries of Sufis in association with various Sufi orders.

In Mauritius, the movement forms majority population. Muhammad Abdul Aleem Siddiqi established the movement in Mauritius. World Islamic Mission (WIM), Halqa-e-Qadria Ishaat-e-Islam and Sunni Razvi Society founded by Muhammad Ibrahim Siddiqui in 1967 and Jummah Mosque (Mauritius) (1852) at Port Louis are some of the notable centers of the movement.

=== Europe, United States and Canada ===
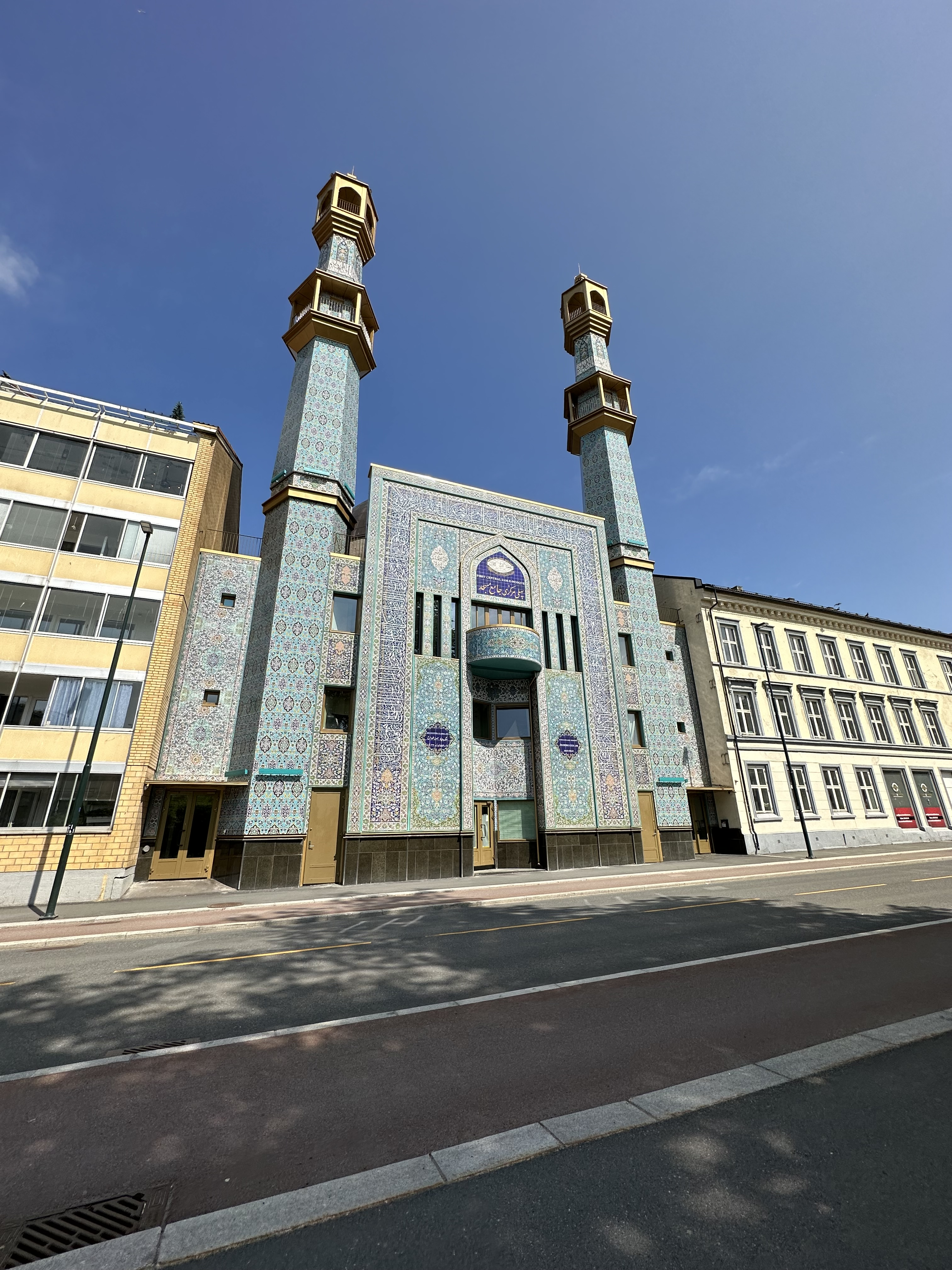
Central Jama Masjid, Oslo, Norway established by World Islamic Mission

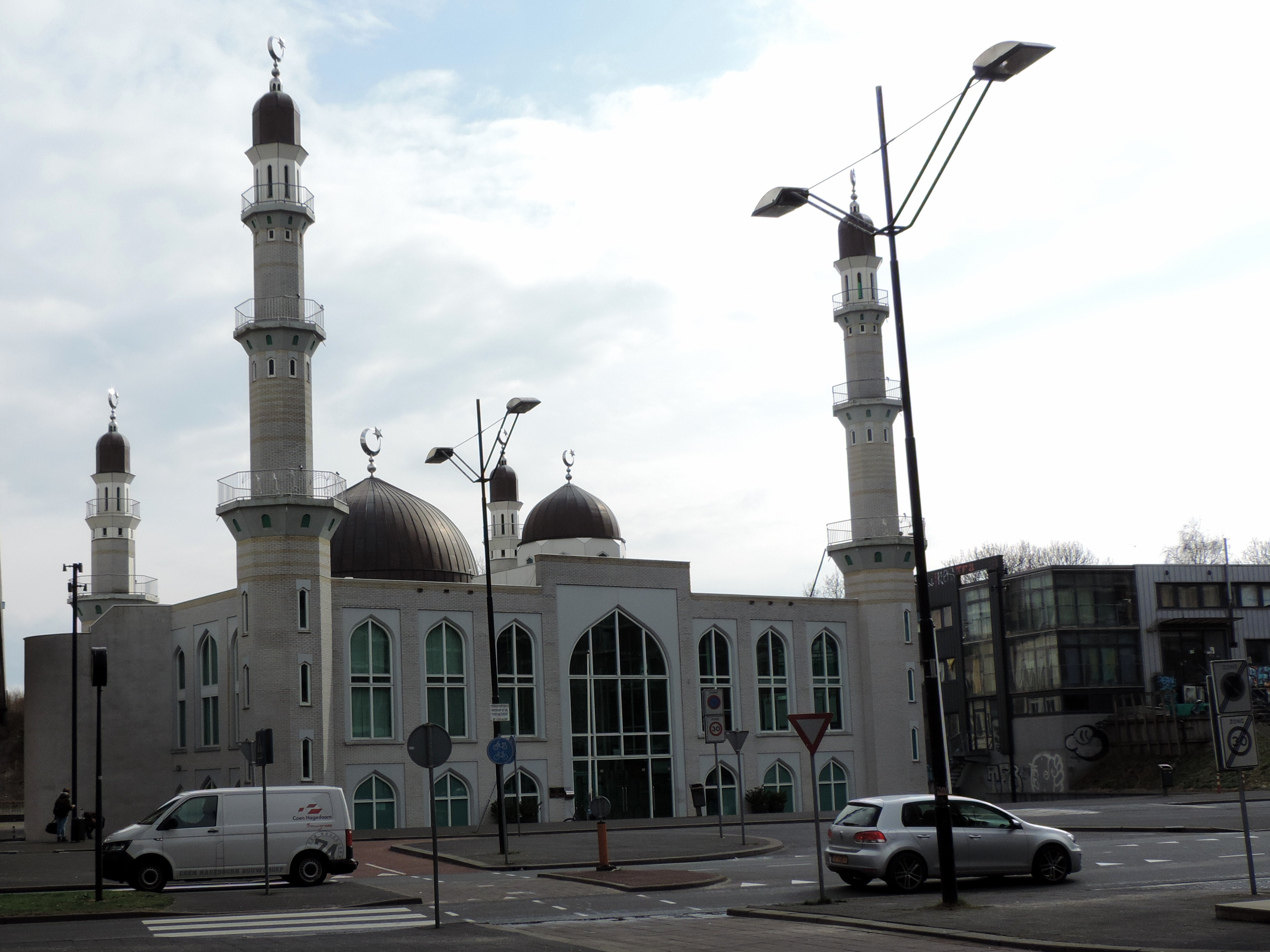
Jamia Taibah Mosque Amsterdam, Netherlands established by World Islamic Mission

In United States and Canada, the movement has found a strong following among Muslims of South Asian and in some cities it has significant presence. Two notable madrasas are Al-Noor Masjid in Houston, Texas and Dar al-Ulum Azizia, in Dallas. Allama Shah Ahmad Noorani Siddiqi, Arshadul Qaudri, Maulana Shahid Raza OBE and Allama Qamaruzzaman Azmi did the missionary work under the banner of World Islamic Mission (WIM) in various parts of Europe including Netherland and in Norway.

In Netherland, the Surinamese community has 25 mosques which are affiliated to the World Islamic Mission and have a Hanafi Barelvi orientation. Prominent centers of the mission in Netherland are Jamia Taibah Mosque Amsterdam, Netherlands, Jamia Anwaar-e-Qoeba Masjid, Utrecht, Madinatul Islam College, The Haugue, Masjid Anwar-e-Madina, Eindhoven, Masjid Gulzar-e-Madina, Zwolle, Masjid Al firdaus, Lelystad, Al Madina Masjid, Den Haag, Netherlands.

World Islamic Mission (WIM) established Central Jamaat-e Ahl-e Sunnat mosque, a congregation and mosque of the Pakistani community in Oslo, Norway with 6,000 members, making it the largest mosque in the Norway. Within Sunni Islam, the mosque is affiliated with Sufism and the Barelvi movement.

In Norway, the WIM established another large mosque named, Jam-e-Mosque in Oslo, Norway in 1980. The mosque in Åkebergveien is the headquarters of World Islamic Mission, one of the biggest Muslim congregations in Norway. It is second largest mosque in Norway. Central Jam-e-Mosque was the first purpose-built mosque in Norway.

The Sunni missionary organization Dawat-e-Islami (D.I) established twelve centers in Greece and seven in Spain which are being used as mosque and madrasas. In Athens, D.I has established four centers.

=== Sri Lanka ===
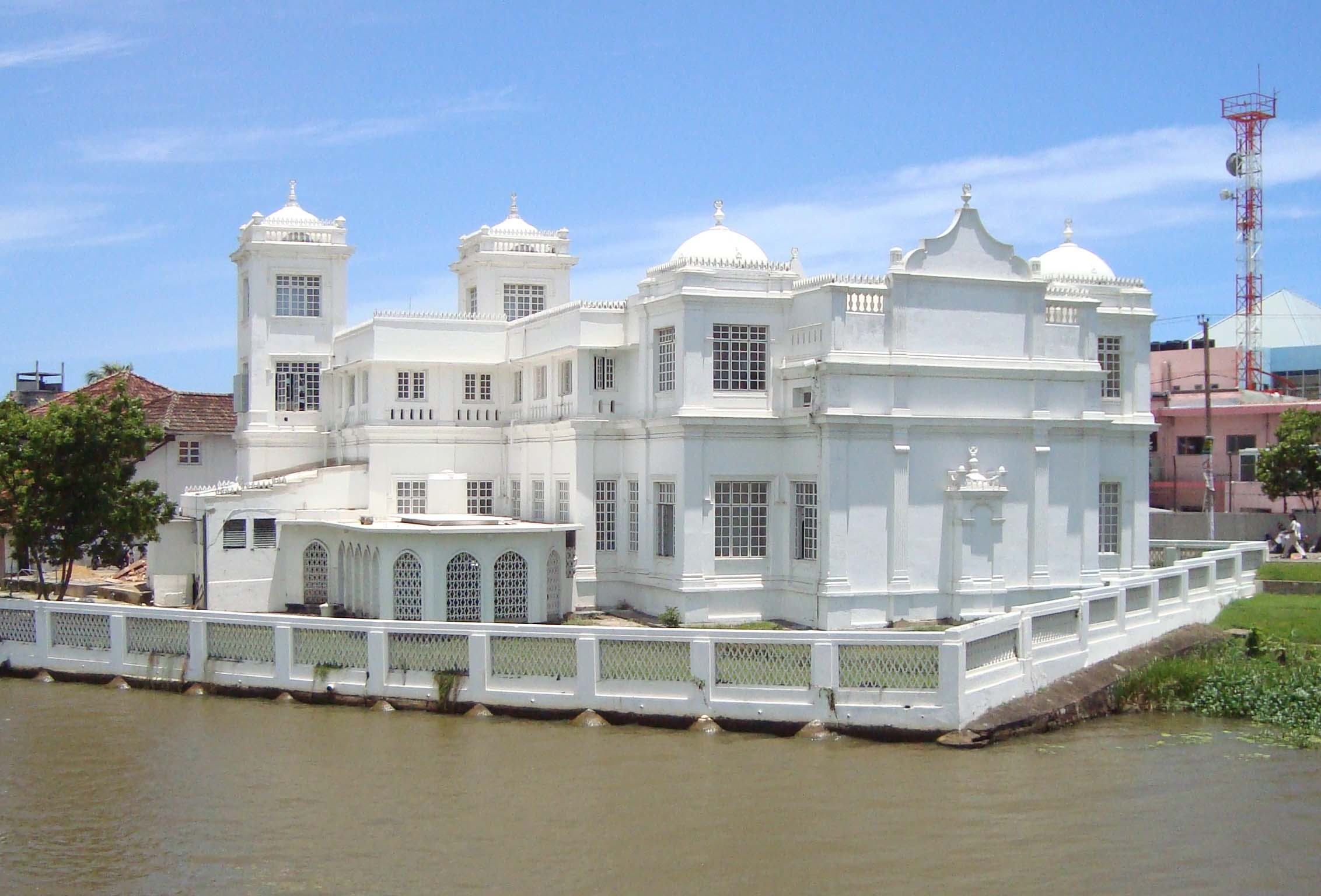
Muhhiyadeen Jummah Mosque (White Mosque)

Muslims generally follow Sufi traditions in Sri Lanka. The Shadhili tariqa, locally referred to as the Shazuliya, has its headquarters in Ummu Zavaya in M.J.M. Laffir Mawatha, Colombo. It was supported by the Al-Fassi family in the 1870s, and is the most prevalent Sufi order among the Sri Lankan Muslims followed by the Qadiriyya order.

In the pre-independence period, the two largest Sri Lankan Sufi orders were associated with rival Muslim gem-trading families and ethnic associations in the Western coastal region, with the Qadiriyya order being allied with N.D.H. Abdul Gaffoor and the All Ceylon Muslim League, and the Shazuliya (Shadhili) order supporting M. Macan Markar and the All Ceylon Moors Association. Sri Lankan Moors also share with their co-religionists across South Asia a devotion to Sufi saints (awliya) and an engagement with local chapters of Sufi orders (tariqa). The two most popular Sufi saints are Abdul Qadir Gilani and Shahul Hamid.

Sunni scholar Muhammad Abdul Aleem Siddiqi built the Hanafi Masjid in Colombo for Sri Lankan Muslims. Sri Lankan Sufi Sunnis identify with organisations such as Hubbul Awliya (Love of the Saint) and Muslims across the island loosely identify themselves as Ahlus Sunnah wal-Jama'ah (traditional Muslims) which is used synonymously in the South Asian context with the Barelvi movement.

The annual festival cycle at the Badriya Mosque still commemorates familiar saints such as Abdul Qadir Jilani, Ahmed Rifai, and Shahul Hamid of Nagoor, as well as the popular Tangal from Androth, Abdul Rashid. Dawatagaha Juma Masjid, Masjid Al Maqbool, Kupiyawatte Jumuah Masjid and Mardana Jumuah Masjid are notable mosques in Colombo. While Masjid Al Badriyeen, Nawala, Talayan Bawa Masjid Ratmalana are some other notable mosques outside Colombo. Missionary organisation Dawat-e-Islami is also actively working in various parts of the Sri Lanka.

== Relations with other Muslim movements ==
The Ahle Sunnat Barelvi movement's relations with Sunni Sufi scholars from various countries have been cordial. The only movements which the Ahle Sunnat Barelvi movement has no relations with are Wahabis/Deobandis. Wahabis/Deobandis were declared to be the enemies of Ahle Sunnah Wal Jama'ah during the 2016 international conference on Sunni Islam in Grozny.

=== 2016 international conference on Sunni Islam in Grozny ===
The scholars who followed Ahle Sunnat wal Jamaat from India and Pakistan namely Sheikh Abubakr Ahmad, Grand Mufti of India, Shaikh Anwar Ahmad al- Baghdadi and Mufti Muḥammad Muneeb-ur-Rehman, Grand Mufti of Pakistan, participated in International Conference on Sunni Islam in Grozny, Chechen Republic in 2016. The conference was convened to define the term "Ahl al-Sunnah wa al-Jama'ah", i.e. who are "the people of Sunnah and majority Muslim community", and to oppose Salafi/Wahabi groups and their ideology. It was attended by 200 notable Muslim scholars from 30 countries which includes Ahmed el-Tayeb (Grand Imam of Al-Azhar), Shawki Allam (Grand Mufti of Egypt), Ali Gomaa (former Grand Mufti of Egypt), Habib Ali al-Jifri among others. It identified Salafism/Wahhabism as a dangerous and misguided sect, along with the extremist groups, such as ISIS, Hizb ut-Tahrir, the Muslim Brotherhood and others. The conference definition stated:

"Ahl al-Sunnah wa al-Jama'ah are the Ash'arites and Maturidis (adherents of the theological systems of Imam Abu Mansur al-Maturidi and Imam Abu al-Hasan al-Ash'ari). In matters of belief, they are followers of any of the four schools of thought (Hanafi, Maliki, Shafi'i or Hanbali) and are also the followers of the Sufism of Imam Junaid al-Baghdadi in doctrines, manners and [spiritual] purification."

This definition was in accordance with the ideology of Ahle Sunnat Barelvi movement. The relations with Deobandi and Wahabism have been strained; Scholars of Ahle Sunnat declared Deoband's founders and Ahl-e-Hadith scholars as "Gustakh-e-Rasool" (the one who blasphemes against the prophet) and infidels and apostates due to their certain writings found to be against Muhammad.

=== Opposition to terrorism ===
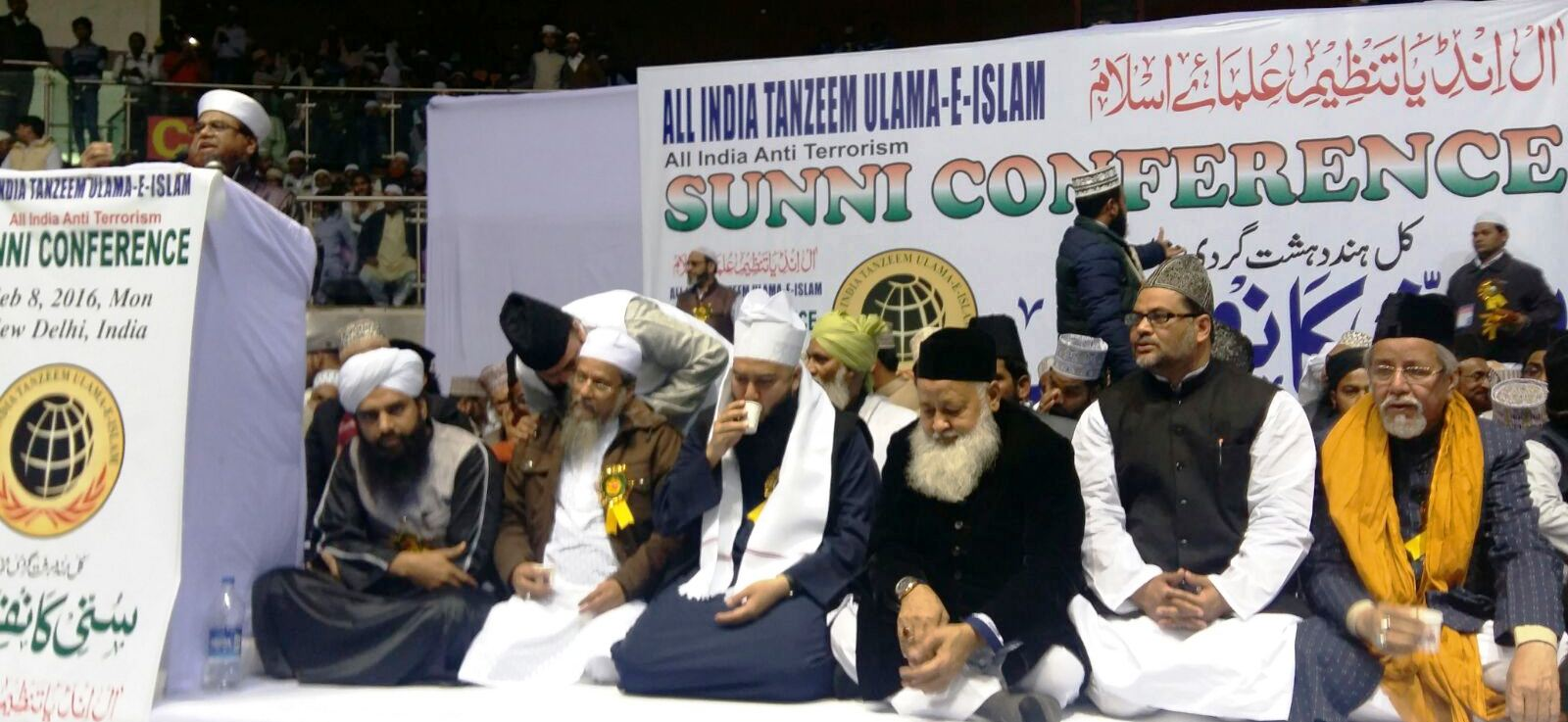
Anti Terror Sunni Conference by All India Tanzeem Ulema-e-Islam

They oppose South Asian Deobandi Taliban movements, organizing rallies and protests in India and Pakistan and condemning what they view as unjustified sectarian violence. The Sunni Ittehad Council (SIC), an alliance of eight Sunni organizations, launched the Save Pakistan Movement to slow Talibanisation. Calling the Taliban a product of global anti-Islamic conspiracies, SIC leaders accused the Taliban of playing into the hands of the United States to divide Muslims and degrade Islam. Supporting this movement, Pakistani Minister of Foreign Affairs Shah Mehmood Qureshi said: "The Sunni Tehreek has decided to activate itself against Talibanisation in the country. A national consensus against terrorism is emerging across the country." In 2009, Islamic scholar Sarfraz Ahmed Naeemi issued a fatwa denouncing suicide bombings and criticized Taliban leader Sufi Muhammad by saying that he "should wear bangles if he is hiding like a woman". Naeemi added, "Those who commit suicide attacks for attaining paradise will go to hell, as they kill many innocent people", and was later killed by a suicide bomber. In India, the Sunni Barelvi community has issued of a fatwa against terrorism, with concerns expressed over activities of Wahabis in New Delhi at All India Sunni Conference in Feb 2016.

== Notable scholars ==
- Abdul Hamid Qadri Badayuni (1898–1970)
- Ahmad Nurani (1926–2003)
- Ahmad Saeed Kazmi (1913–1986)
- Ahmed Raza Khan Barelvi (1856–1921) – an Islamic revivalist who was founder of the Barelvi movement
- Akhtar Raza Khan (1941–2018)
- Ameen Mian Quadri (born 1955)
- Amjad Ali Aazmi (1882–1948)
- Arshadul Qadri (1925–2002)
- Asjad Raza Khan (born 1970)
- Fazlur Rahman Ansari (1914–1974)
- Faiz-ul Hassan Shah (1911–1984)
- Ghulam Ali Okarvi (1919–2000)
- Hamid Raza Khan (1875–1943)
- Hamid Saeed Kazmi (born 1957)
- Ilyas Qadri (born 1950)
- Jamaat Ali Shah (1834–1951) – President of All India Sunni Conference
- Kaif Raza Khan - (born 2001)
- Kanthapuram A. P. Aboobacker Musliyar (born 1939
- Karam Shah al-Azhari (1918–1998)
- Kaukab Noorani Okarvi (born 1957)
- Khadim Hussain Rizvi (1966–2020)
- Mohammad Abdul Ghafoor Hazarvi (1909–1970)
- Muhammad Arshad Misbahi (born 1968)
- Muhammad Fazal Karim (1954–2013)
- Muhammad Madni Ashraf Ashrafi Al-Jilani (born 1938)
- Muhammad Muslehuddin Siddiqui (1918–1983)
- Mukhtar Ashraf (died 1996)
- Muneeb-ur-Rehman (born 1945)
- Mustafa Raza Khan Qadri (1892–1981)
- Naeem-ud-Deen Muradabadi (1887–1948)
- Omar Abedeen Qasmi Madani (born 1981)
- Pir Naseeruddin Naseer (1949–2009)
- Qamaruzzaman Azmi (born 1946)
- Raza Saqib Mustafai (born 1972)
- Sarfraz Ahmed Naeemi (1948–2009)
- Sardar Ahmad Chishti (1903–1962)
- Shafee Okarvi (1930–1984)
- Shamsul-hasan Shams Barelvi (1917–1997)
- Shihabuddeen Ahmed Koya (1885–1954)
- Sibtain Raza Khan (1927–2015)
- Syed Shujaat Ali Qadri (1941–1993)
- Waqaruddin Qadri (1915–1993)
- Yaseen Akhtar Misbahi (1953–2003)
- Yasir Nadeem al Wajidi (born 1982)
- Ziaul Mustafa Razvi Qadri (born 1935)

== Notable organizations ==
=== Pakistan ===
In Pakistan, prominent Sunni Barelvi religious and political organizations include:

- Dawat-e-Islami
- Jamaat Ahle Sunnat
- Jamiat Ulema-e-Pakistan
- Majlis-e-Tahaffuz-e-Khatme Nabuwwat – The Assembly to Protect the End of Prophethood
- Sunni Ittehad Council
- Sunni Tehreek
- Tehreek-e-Labaik

=== In India ===
- All India Ulema and Mashaikh Board
- Jama'at Raza-e-Mustafa
- Karwan-I-Islami
- Muslim Jamaat
- Raza Academy

=== In the United Kingdom ===
- World Islamic Mission
- British Muslim Forum
- TheSunniWay

=== In Bangladesh ===
- World Sunni Movement
- Bangladesh Islami Front
- Bangladesh Islami Chattra Sena

=== In South Africa ===
- Sunni Razvi Society
- Imam Mustafa Raza Research Centre, Durban, South Africa

== Main institutions ==
=== India ===
- Al Jamiatul Ashrafia, Uttar Pradesh, India
- Al-Jame-atul-Islamia, Raunahi
- Jamia Al Barkaat Aligarh, Aligarh
- Jamia Amjadia Rizvia, Ghosi
- Jamiatur Raza, Bareilly
- Manzar-e-Islam, Bareilly
- Darul Uloom Rabbaniya, Uttar Pradesh
- Markazu Saqafathi Sunniyya
- Jamia Nizamia, Hyderabad

=== Pakistan ===
- Aleemiyah Institute of Islamic Studies
- Hizbul Ahnaf
- Jamia Amjadia Rizvia Karachi
- Ashraf ul Madaris, G.T Road, Okara, Punjab, Pakistan
- Jamia Naeemia Lahore
- Jamia Nizamia Ghousia Wazirabad
- Jamia-tul-Madina

=== Bangladesh ===
- Jamia Ahmadiyya Sunnia Kamil Madrasa

=== Mauritius ===
- Sunni Razvi Society

=== United Kingdom ===
- Jamia Al-Karam

=== Republic of Ireland ===
- Al-Mustafa Islamic Cultural Centre Ireland

=== Singapore ===
- Jamiyah Singapore

=== South Africa ===
- Darul Uloom Pretoria
- Imam Ahmed Raza Academy

=== Sri Lanka ===
- Anjuman Faiz-e-Raza

== See also ==
- Pakistan Movement
- Islamic Republic of Pakistan
- Bibliography of Barelvi movement
- Islam in India
- Islam in Pakistan
- Islamic schools and branches
- Schools of Islamic theology
- List of Muslim philosophers
- List of Pakistani poets
- List of Urdu-language poets
