= Idara-e-Shariah =

Socio-religious organization of Indian Muslims

- Formation: 1968, Bihar, India
- Type: NGO
- Legal status: Active
- Region served: India
- Official language: Urdu, English, Hindi
- Staff: 150
- Volunteers: 10000
- Website: www.edara-e-sharia.com

Idara-e-Shariah, (Urdu: ادارہ شریعہ) (Hindi: इदारा इ शरिया), is a socio-religious organization of Indian Muslims associated with the Ahle Sunnat wal Jamaat (Barelvi) movement. Its headquarter is situated in Sultanganj, Patna, Bihar. It was established in 1968 to deal with problems of personal matters of the Indian Muslims. It has branches in Uttar Pradesh, Jharkhand, Chhattisgarh, Orissa, Punjab and West Bengal.

Idara has a great influence over the lacs of masses. It is responsible for moon sighting and declaration of Islamic festivals in these states. It is considered as the highest socio-religious body of Muslims in Jharkhand, Patna, Ludhiana etc.

The President of Idara e Shariah of Bihar, Jharkhand, Punjab are Maulana Gulam Rasool Balyawi, Maulana Qutbuddin Razvi, Maulana Faruque Alam Razvi respectively.

== Functions ==
The other important activity of Idara-e-Shariah is Darul Qaza, or informal Islamic courts, where the cases are heard and out of court settlement is being given in cases related to Personal Law. Idara-e-Shariah. Darul Ifta is also an important part of Idara-e-Shariah where legal opinions are given according to Quran and Hadees in various matters related to Muslims. Idara-e-Shariah has a Department of Education which is an umbrella body of thousands of Primary religious schools. The chief general secretary of Idara-E-Sharia, Maulana Qutubuddin Razwi in Jharkhand.

Sanaullah Rizvi is chief administrator of Idara-e-Sharia, Bihar Idara-e Shariah also guides the Muslim community during elections. It normally issues appeals and statements indicating their voting preferences to their followers at election time. Idara-e-Sharia at Firangi Mahali, Lucknow proposed to inform Muslims in Uttar Pradesh to keep preparations for the documents required for the National Register of Citizens (NRC).

== Leadership ==
Leader	State	Post
Maulana Gulam Rasool Balyawi	Bihar	President
Maulana Qutubuddin Razvi	Jharkhand	President
Maulana Farooque Alam Razvi	Punjab	President
Syed Raees Ashraf Jilani	Chhattisgarh	President
Maulana Affan Atiq Firangi Maheli	Odisha	General Secretary

== Branches ==
In March 2014, The Government of Jharkhand had approved opening of 8 Darul Ifta under Idara-e-Shariah in the State.

1. Jama Masjid Baghadadia, Kharsavan
2. Anjuman Islamia, Lohardaga
3. Chhoti Masjid Navatoli, Daltonganj
