= Kaif Raza Khan =

21st century Indian scholar

Maulana Muhammad Kaif Raza Khan
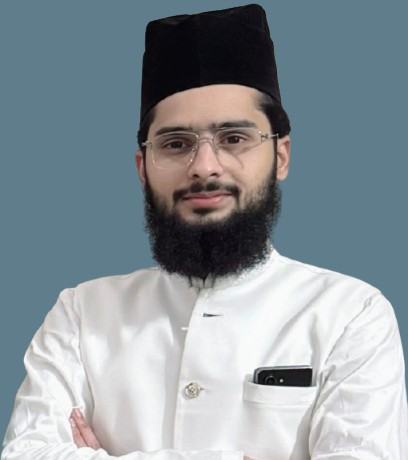
- Title: Fida-e-Millat

Personal life
- Born: 25 December 2001 (age 24) Bareilly, India
- Parent: Shuaib Raza Khan (father)
- Era: Contemporary
- Website: ustadezaman.com

Religious life
- Religion: Islam
- Denomination: Sunni
- Jurisprudence: Hanafi
- Tariqa: Qadri, Chishti, Suharwardi, Naqshbandi
- Creed: Maturidi
- Movement: Ahl-e-Sunnat Wal Jamaat
- Profession: Islamic Scholar

Muhammad Kaif Raza Khan (born 25 December 2001), is an Indian Islamic scholar, activist and cleric who belongs to the Ahl-e-Sunnat Wal Jamaat Movement. Khan is a descendant of Hassan Raza Khan Barelvi. He is the president of Dargah Ustad E Zaman Trust.

== Personal life ==
Kaif Raza Khan is a descendant of Hassan Raza Khan Barelvi, younger brother of Ahmed Raza Khan Barelvi, founder of the Barelvi movement. He belongs to the Barech tribe of the Pushtuns. He is the nephew of Tauqeer Raza Khan.

== Lineage ==
Naqi Ali Khan
Ahmed Raza Khan	Hassan Raza Khan
Hamid Raza Khan	Mustafa Raza Khan	Hussain Raza Khan	Hasnain Raza Khan
Ibrahim Raza Khan
Akhtar Raza Khan
Asjad Raza Khan
Kaif Raza Khan

== Statements and views ==
In July 2023, Khan criticised the cancellation of Muharram holiday over a programme related to the National Education Policy and described the decision as a "Tuglaqi Farmaan" against social and religious harmony. Khan also criticised Narendra Modi over the issue.

In January 2023, During the Urs festival, Ajmer the anniversary of the death of Sufi saint Moinuddin Chishti, Khan expressed displeasure over restrictions imposed on Barelvi clerics at Ajmer Sharif Dargah related to speeches, recitation of salaam and distribution of literature. Khan later said that he would visit Ajmer Sharif and present salaam which is written by Ala Hazrat at the shrine along with other Sunni Barelvi Scholars.

=== Reaction to Quran burning in Sweden ===
Raza Khan condemned the Quran burning incident in Sweden involving Rasmus Paludan and called for action against those responsible. Khan also urged the Indian Government to condemn the incident and press for an apology from Swedish Government.

=== Ajmer Sharif dispute ===
In January 2023, Raza Khan objected to a meeting between Salman Hasan, son-in-law of Asjad Raza Khan, and Sarwar Chishti, khadim of Ajmer Sharif Dargah after tensions during the Urs festival, Ajmer. Khan questioned the meeting because of the earlier dispute involving Barelvi pilgrims during the Urs.

== Activism ==
During the initial phase of the COVID-19 pandemic in India, Khan provided free ration kits to the needy through his organisation. He also delivered hundreds of free Sehri meals every day to the attendants of the hospitalised people during the month of Ramadan.

On 18 April 2023, Khan also supported proposed protest announced by Ittehad-e-Millat Council chief Tauqeer Raza Khan and appealed to the public to participate in the protest. The protest focused on such as law and order concerns, alleged oppression of Muslims, and deaths in police custody in the state of Uttar Pradesh, India. He also said:

The condition of the country and state is not hidden from anyone. In such a situation, to protect the constitution, the protest proposed by Tauqeer Miyan will be held at Islamia Maidan Bareilly on April 19, within the ambit of the constitution. Against the oppression of muslims in India if peace-loving citizens do not come forward in time, dictatorship will be established in our country".

On 19 April 2023, Ittehad-e-Millat Council chief Tauqeer Raza Khan, Kaif Raza Khan, and their supporters were not permitted to hold a sit-in at Islamia Maidan Bareilly to protest. Khan described the denial of permission as a symbol of dictatorship.

In June 2023, In a press conference, Khan targeted Bageshwar Dham's chief, Dhirendra Krishna Shastri, and said that, Shastri is working to spread hatred against Muslims in the country through anti national speech. Further said, Shastri who dreams of a Hindu nation, should know that Dr. Bhimrao Ambedkar had said in 1940 that if Hindu nation becomes a reality, it will be the biggest disaster for the country. According to Khan, Mahatma Gandhi and Sardar Patel also believed in the same thing regarding the Hindu nation. Khan demanded a sedition case be registered against Dhirendra Shastri. Following Khan's statement, the office bearers of All India Brahmin Mahasabha organised a meeting at the central office. In which his statement regarding Shastri was condemned.

In 2023, During the Gaza–Israel war, Khan was involved in relief activities related to Palestinians affected by the conflict. According to media reports, he met Palestinian ambassador Adnan Abu Al-haija in New Delhi regarding humanitarian assistance, and later relief materials were sent through Egypt with support from Egyptian Red Crescent Society channels for people affected in Gaza.

== See also ==
- Barelvi family
