= Subhan Raza Khan =

Indian Islamic scholar

Personal life
- Born: Bareilly, Uttar Pradesh, India
- Children: Mufti Ahsan Raza Khan
- Parent: Rehan Raza Khan (father)
- Era: Modern Era
- Region: India
- Main interest: Sufism
- Notable work: Editor of Ala Hazrat Monthly magazine
- Occupation: Islamic Scholar
- Relations: Tawqir Raza Khan (brother)

Religious life
- Religion: Islam
- Denomination: Sunni
- Jurisprudence: Hanafi
- Tariqa: Qadiriyya
- Creed: Maturidi
- Movement: Barelvi

Subhan Raza Khan is an Indian Islamic scholar who was the former head of Bareilly Dargah, shrine of his great-great grandfather Ahmed Raza Khan, in Bareilly, India. He is chairperson of the Manzar-e-Islam seminary. He also edits the Urdu-language Ala Hazrat monthly magazine which is published in Dargah. His son Ahsan Raza Khan has been appointed present head of the Bareilly Dargah.

In 2015 during a protest against illegal encroachment on Waqf properties, he called Samajwadi Party founder-patron Mulayam Singh Yadav an "RSS agent".

== Activism ==
=== Call to boycott the Taliban and Wahabi ideology ===
In the presence of lacs of Sunni Muslims during Urs-e-Razvi in 2014 at the Bareilly Dargah, Barelvi clerics condemned the terrorism practiced by the Taliban, and the ideology of the Wahhabi. He said the world should come together to protest the killing of innocent people in the name of Islam. Ulemas should launch a campaign against the Taliban and the Wahhabis.

== See also ==
- Ahmad Raza Khan
- Mustafa Raza Khan Qadri
- Hamid Raza Khan
- Akhtar Raza Khan
- Hassan Raza Khan
