= Ibrahim Raza Khan =

20th-century Indian scholar

Mufassir-e-Azam-e-Hind, Mufti Muhammad Ibrahim Raza Khan Qadri Razvi
- مفسر اعظم ہند مفتی محمد ابراہیم رضا خان قادری رضوی
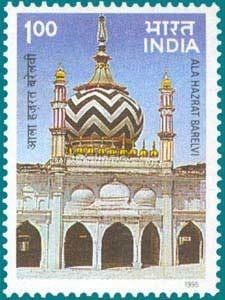
- Born: Muhammad; 10th Rabi' al-Thani 1325 (1907 CE); Bareilly, North-Western Provinces, British India
- Died: 11th of Safar 1385 Hijri 12 June 1965 (aged 57–58); Bareilly, Uttar Pradesh, India
- Burial place: Dargah E A'ala Hazrat, Bareilly, Uttar Pradesh, India
- Other names: Jilani Miya, Shahzada-e-Akbar-o-Jaanasheen-e-Huzoor Hamid Raza Khan
- Citizenship: British India, after 15 August 1947 Indian
- Education: Manzar-e-Islam
- Occupations: Mystic, Preacher, Jurist, Theologian, Orator, Mufti, Islamic Scholar, Spiritual Leader and author
- Years active: 1907–1965
- Era: Late Modern Era and Contemporary
- Organization: Jama'at Raza-e-Mustafa
- Notable work: Monthly A'ala Hazrat magazine, Zikrullah, Nehmatullah, Hujjatullah, Fazaa'il-e-Durood Shareef, Tafseer Surah Balad, Tashreeh Qasida Mu'mania
- Title: Maulana, Jilani Miyan
- Term: 1926–1965
- Predecessor: Hamid Raza Khan
- Successor: Subhan Raza Khan
- Movement: Barelvi movement
- Opponents: Deobandi; Ahle Hadith (Gair Muqalid); Quranism (Ahle Quran); Shia Islam Rafzi; Qadyani etc.
- Children: Rehan Raza Khan; Akhtar Raza Khan Mannan Raza Khan
- Father: Hamid Raza Khan
- Relatives: Ahmed Raza Khan Barelvi (Grandfather), Hassan Raza Khan (Brother of Grandfather), Mustafa Raza Khan Qadri (Paternal Uncle), Subhan Raza Khan (Grandson), Asjad Raza Khan (Grandson)
- Family: Ahmad Raza Khan Qadri

42nd Imam and Sheikh E Tariqat of Silsila E Aliyah Qadriyah Barkaatiyah Razviyah Nooriyah
- In office 1926 – 1965
- Preceded by: Hamid Raza Khan
- Succeeded by: Akhtar Raza Khan (Azhari Miya)

Mohtamim (Head) of Darul Uloom Jamia Razwiya Manjar E Islam,
- In office 1943 – 1965
- Preceded by: Hamid Raza Khan
- Succeeded by: Rehan Raza Khan

Sajjada nashin of Khanqah E Aliya Razviya
- In office 1943 – 1965
- Preceded by: Hamid Raza Khan
- Succeeded by: Subhan Raza Khan

Mutawalli of Raza Jama Masjid and Dargah E A'ala Hazrat
- In office 1943 – 1965
- Preceded by: Hamid Raza Khan
- Succeeded by: Subhan Raza Khan

Religious life
- Religion: Islam
- Denomination: Sunni Islam
- Institute: Barelvi
- Founder of: Monthly A'ala Hazrat Magazine
- Lineage: Ahmad Raza Khan Qadri
- Jurisprudence: Hanafi
- Tariqa: Qadiriyya (Main), Naqshbandiyah, Suhrawardiyah, Chishtiyah
- Creed: Maturidi

Muhammad Ibrahim Raza Khan Qadri Razvi (1907–1965), commonly known as Mufassir-e-Azam-e-Hind and Jilani Miyan, was an Indian Islamic scholar, Sufi mystic, orator, and author. He was a leader of the Barelvi movement of Sunni Islam.

== Early life and education ==
Ibrahim was born into the family of Islamic scholar Ahmed Raza Khan Barelvi, in 1907. Ibrahim was the elder son of Hamid Raza Khan.

Under the guidance of his grandmother and mother, Ibrahim started his primary education in reading the Quran and books in Urdu. At seven, he was enrolled at the Manzar-e-Islam. Ibrahim's teachers at the seminary were Maulana Ahsan Ali Sahab Muhadith Faizpuri, his father Hamid Raza, and Sardar Ahmad Chishti. He graduated at the age of 19 in 1344 Hijri (1926 CE). At the graduation ceremony, his father tied a turban (dastar) on his son's head.

Ibrahim succeeded his father, from whom he inherited all duties, that were given by Ahmed Barelvi, including being the Sajjada Nashin of Khanqah-E-Aliya Razviya, the headship of Darul Uloom Jamia Razwiya Manzar E Islam, and the mutawallī (administrator) of Raza Jama Masjid and Dargah E A'ala Hazrat.

== Career ==
He was the 42nd Imam and Shaykh of the Silsila Aaliyah Qaadiriyah Barakaatiyah Razviyah Nooriyah. At the age of four, Ibrahim Khan became the murid (disciple) of his grandfather Ahmad Raza Khan Qadri who gave him the Khilaafat of Silsila Aaliyah Qaadiriyah Barakaatiyah Razviyah Nooriyah. He also gained Hujjat al-Islam from his father and uncle Mustafa Raza Khan Qadri.

In 1372 Hijri Ibrahim Khan visited Harmain Sharifain and got various ijazah for hadith, Dalaail-e-Khairaat, and Hizbul Bahr from the ulamas of Mecca and Medina.

Ibrahim Khan had several students and disciples including Rehan Raza Khan Qadri Razvi, Muhammad Akhtar Raza Khan Qadri Razvi, bdul Wajid Qadr Jilani, Samsullah Razvi Hasmati Bastawi, Abdul Hakim Razvi Jilani, and Aafaaz Ahmad Razvi Jilani.

He initiated the monthly Alahazrat magazine for the propagation of the teachings of the Sunni school. Until 2024, this magazine was in circulation with Subhan Raza Khan as the editor-in-chief and Muhammad Ahsan Raza Khan its editor.

== Personal life ==
Ibrahim Khan was married to his cousin sister, the elder daughter of Mustafa Raza Khan Qadri. The marriage was solemnised by their grandfather when they were still children 1347 Hijri (1929 CE). Ibrahim Khan had eight children with his wife: five sons and three daughters, including Akhtar Raza Khan.

== Literary works ==
Khan's works include:

- Zikrullah
- Nehmatullah
- Hujjatullah
- Fazaa'il-e-Durood Shareef
- Tafseer Surah Balad
- Tashreeh Qasida Mu'mania

== Death ==
Khan died after being sick for three consecutive years on 11 Safar 1385 Hijri (12 June 1965 CE). His funeral prayer was arranged at the Islamia Inter College, and led by Muhammad Afzal Hussain. He was buried in Bareilly Sharif Dargah, in Bareilly.

== See also ==
- Naqi Ali Khan
- Jama'at Raza-e-Mustafa
