= Hashmat Ali Khan =

Indian Islamic scholar (1902–1960)

Mazhar-e-Aala Hazrat, Abul Fatah,Sher-e-Sunnat Muhammad Hashmat Ali Khan Qadri Razvi

Personal life
- Born: Muhammad Hashmat Ali; 1902 Amethi, Lucknow, India
- Died: 3 July 1960 (aged 57–58) मुंबई (महाराष्ट्र)
- Resting place: Hashmat Nagar, Pilibhit, Uttar Pradesh
- Main interest(s): Sufism, Debates with scholars of other Religious movements
- Education: Manzar-e-Islam, Bareilly
- Known for: Book against the two-nation theory
- Pen name: Hashmat

Religious life
- Religion: Islam
- Denomination: Sunni
- Jurisprudence: Hanafi
- Tariqa: Qadiriyya
- Creed: Maturidi
- Movement: Barelvi

Muslim leader
- Teacher: Ahmed Raza Khan Barelvi, Amjad Ali Aazmi, Hamid Raza Khan, Zafar al-din Bihari
- Influenced by: Abu Hanifa, Moinuddin Chishti, Ahmed Raza Khan Barelvi
- Influenced: Barelvi movement

Muhammad Hashmat Ali Khan Qadri Lucknowi (1902–3 July 1960) popularly known as Sher Beesha-e-Ahle Sunnat or Munazir-e-Ahle Sunnat was an Indian Islamic scholar, cleric, author and writer belonging to the Barelvi movement of Sunni Islam. He was the spiritual successor of Ahmed Raza Khan Barelvi in the Qadiriyya-Razaviyya order of Sufism. He was against the ideology of Muhammad Ali Jinnah and he had written a book against the Two-nation theory which is still banned in Pakistan.

== Early life and education ==
He was born in 1902 in Amethi, Lucknow, India. By the age of 9, he had already qualified as a Hafizul Quran, memorizing the entire Quran. At the age of 12, he mastered Qirat-e-Saba, which refers to the seven canonical recitations of the Quran.

At the young age of 14, he was sent to Dar al-Uloom Manzar-e-Islam in Bareilly to study under the tutelage of the scholars of his time. There, he became a disciple of Ahmed Raza Khan Barelvi, an Islamic scholar and the founder of Barelvi movement under Sunni Islam. Barelvi paid special attention to the Hashmat Ali.

He also studied under Amjad Ali Aazmi, and Hamid Raza Khan, the elder son of Ahmed Raza Khan Barelvi. His educational journey was marked by his excellence in learning and debating, which earned him the title of "Abul Fatah" from Ahmed Raza Khan.

His early life set the foundation for his later achievements as a lecturer, Mufti, and Principal in various religious institutions, and as a Khateeb at the Zeenat-ul-Masjid in Gojra Waala, Delhi.

== Life ==
=== Spiritual Journey ===
- At 14, he took Bai’at (pledge) at the hands of Ahmed Raza Khan Barelvi.
- Earned the title of "Abul Fatah" from Ahmed Raza Khan Barelvi.
- Became a lecturer, Mufti, and Principal at various religious institutions.
- Served as a Khateeb at Zeenat-ul-Masjid in Gojra Waala.

Teachings and Legacy:

- Known for his oratory skills, deeply drowned in the love of the Holy Prophet Muhammad.
- Warned believers against the Deobandi movement and Wahhabism and called them as "Thieves of Imaan" to protect their faith.
- His tongue was described as a "naked sword," cutting through false beliefs with bright proofs.
- His words also offered comfort and guidance to true believers.

== Views on Two-nation theory ==
He was against the Two-nation theory given by Muhammad Ali Jinnah. In 1939, Hashmat Ali Khan and Syed Shah Aulad-e-Rasool Muhammad Miyan (1892-1955) was against the creation of Pakistan and challenged the Muslim League's assertion as the sole spokesperson of Indian Muslims.

=== Jamat-e-Ahle Sunnat ===
Hashmat Ali Khan along with his contemporary Barelvi ulema such as Maulana Ghulam Jilani, Maulana Abdul Qadir, Maulana Abdul Rahman, Maulana Shariful Haq Amjadi had opposed the Two-nation theory and came forward to form Jamat-e-Ahle Sunnat, an organization formed to oppose the creation of Pakistan. It was centred at the Khanquah-e-Barakatiya of Marehra, Etah district. The organization published Muslim League Ki Zarri Bakhiya and Ehkam-e-Shariat Bar Humzaban-e-League-e-Ahle Bid'at, two treatises of Fatwas issued by Maulana Syed Shah Aulad-e-Rasool Muhammad Miyan.

== Works ==
- Fatawa Hashmatia, a collection of fatwas addressing various aspects of Islamic jurisprudence and belief.
- Sawarim-ul-Hindiya, a collection of Fatwas against the Imams of Deobandi movement
- Munazra-e-Sambhal
- Munazra-e-Surat
- Munazra-e-Punjab
- Al-Qilada-tul-Tayyab
- Taqreer Muneer-e-Qalb
- Radd-e-Al Muhannad
- Raaz Seerat Committee
- Ulama-e-Deoband Ki Makkariyaan

== Legacy ==
Darul Uloom Hashmat-ur-Raza, Hashmat Nagar, Pilibhit was founded and established in the memory of Ali Khan.

== Bibliography ==
- Anjum, Ghulam Yahya (1992). Maulana Hashmat Ali Lucknawi: Ek Tahqiqi Mut'ala (in Urdu). Danish Kada, New Delhi. p. 351.
- Noori, Muhammad Afthab Cassim Razvi (2007). The Lion of Ahle Sunnat: Allama Hashmat Ali Khan. Durban, South Africa: Imam Mustafa Raza Research Centre.
