= Asjad Raza Khan =

Indian Muslim cleric (born 1970)

Qazi-ul-Quzzat Hind Qaid-e-Millat Muhammad Asjad Raza Khan

Personal life
- Born: Muhammad Munawwar Raza, (15 Shaban 1390 Hijri), 16 October 1970 (age 56) Bareilly, Uttar Pradesh India
- Children: Hussam Ahmad Raza Khan Humam Ahmad Raza Khan and four daughters
- Parent: Akhtar Raza Khan Azhari (father)
- Era: contemporary
- Education: Manzar-e-Islam, Islamia Inter College, Bareilly
- Relatives: Ahmad Raza Khan (great great grandfather), Hamid Raza Khan (great grandfather), Ibrahim Raza Khan (grandfather), Sibtain Raza Khan (father-in-law); Rehan Raza Khan (uncle); Tawqir Raza Khan (cousin); Subhan Raza Khan (cousin)
- Website: www.muftiasjadraza.com

Religious life
- Religion: Islam
- Denomination: Sunni
- Jurisprudence: Hanafi
- Tariqa: Qadri
- Creed: Maturidi
- Movement: Barelvi

Asjad Raza Khan (born 16 October 1970) Qaid-e-Millat is an Indian Islamic scholar who belongs to the Barelvi movement and a descendant of Ahmed Raza Khan Barelvi and son and successor of Akhtar Raza Khan, former Grand Mufti of India.

He is known by his followers as Ameer-e-Ahle Sunnat ("Leader of the Ahle al-Sunnat"), Mufti-e-Azam Hind ("Grand Mufti of India"), Qazi-ul-Quzzat ("Islamic Chief Justice") and Qaid-e-Millat ("Leader of the Nation"). He is serving the Principal of Jamiatur Raza since 2019. He has been featured in The Muslim Mirror 100: The Most Influential Indian Muslims of 2025, published by Muslim Mirror in the Islamic scholars category.

== Early life ==
Asjad Raza Khan was born as Muhammad Munawwar Raza Muhamid on 16 October 1970 (15 Sha‘ban 1390 AH) in Mohalla Khwaja Qutub, Bareilly district, Uttar Pradesh. He is the son of Akhtar Raza Khan, who later served as the Grand Mufti of India.

=== Lineage ===
Naqi Ali Khan
Ahmed Raza Khan	Hassan Raza Khan
Hamid Raza Khan	Mustafa Raza Khan	Hussain Raza Khan	Hasnain Raza Khan
Ibrahim Raza Khan
Akhtar Raza Khan
Asjad Raza Khan
Kaif Raza Khan

== Statements and views ==
=== Extreme ideologies must be repelled ===
After the bombings in Sri Lanka in 2019, Asjad Raza issued a strongly worded statement condemning the attacks and urging all nations to "repel the evil" and combat terrorist ideologies.

=== Demanding a ban on Zakir Naik ===
Upon Zakir Naik being named as one of the influencers of the bombers in a terrorist attack in Bangladesh, Asjad said:

“India is the land of Sufism. Dr Naik speaks the language of terrorism. His thoughts are not Islamic, but related to (fundamentalist) Wahhabism. Back in 2008, we had demanded that the central and state governments to impose a ban on his speeches and programmes. Sufi Barelvis are united against him."

Asjad Raza also appealed to Muslim youth to refrain from listening to his speeches.

=== Refusal to recite the National Song ===
Asjad Raza opposed the forced singing of the Vande Mataram song on Indian Independence Day at minority run educational institutions due to it being "un-Islamic", despite being ordered to by the Uttar Pradesh government.

== Controversy ==
=== Related to Salman Hasan Siddiqui ===
On 29 July 2021, during a press conference Mannan Raza Khan alias Mannani Miyan, spoke out strongly against Asjad Raza, in July 2021 when reports emerged that Asjad Raza's son-in-law Salman Hasan Siddiqui had met privately with Yogi Adityanath, the Chief Minister of Uttar Pradesh. Mannani questioned Asjad Raza's qualifications for Qazi-al-Hindustan and suggested that he needed to present his educational qualifications for the role. Mannani Miyan stated that people were misusing the name of the Dargah Aala Hazrat for their own benefits. He said that if his brother, Akhtar Raza Khan, was alive, he would have been very disheartened with the situation. Mannani Miyan demanded Asjad Raza to renounce the charge of Qazi-al-Hindustan, that he dissolve Jama'at Raza-e-Mustafa, and handover all documents to the family.
