= Muhammad Muslehuddin Siddiqui =

South Asian Islamic preacher (1918–1983)

Muhammad Muslehuddin Siddiqui Qadri Razavi
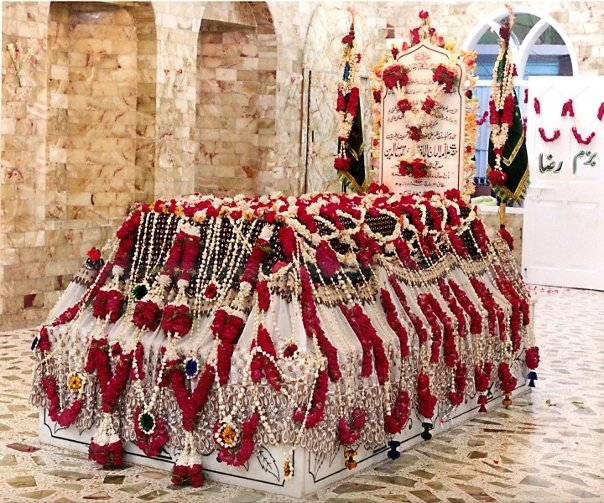
- Shrine of Mazar Qari Muslehuddin Siddiqui
- Title: Qari, Sheikh, Hafiz

Personal life
- Born: 1336 AH / 27 December 1918 CE
- Died: 1403 AH / 23 March 1983 CE Karachi
- Era: Modern

Religious life
- Religion: Islam
- Denomination: Sunni
- Jurisprudence: Hanafi
- Creed: Maturidi
- Movement: Barelvi

Muslim leader
- Influenced by: Abdul Qadir Jilani, Ahmed Raza Khan Barelvi, Hafiz-e-Millat Shah Abdul Azeez Muradabadi
- Influenced: Shah Turab ul Haq, Abdul Azeem (Bangladesh)

Muhammad Muslehuddin Siddiqui (27 December 1918 – 23 March 1983) (Urdu محمد مصلح الدین صدیقى), was a preacher born in Nanded on India's Deccan Plateau. He belonged to the Barelvi movement of Sunni Islam and a mureed of Amjad Ali Aazmi.

== Education ==
Under the supervision of his father Ghulam Jilani, he memorized the Quran. On the suggestion of Muhammad Abdul Aziz Muhaddis Mubarakpuri, in 1935 at the age of 17 years he went to Darul-uloom Ashrafiya in Mubarakpur, Azamgarh, Uttar Pradesh, where he studied fiqh, hadith and other Islamic subjects. After 8 years at this university, he travelled with Abdul Azeez Mubarakpuri in 1943 to Nagpur.

Sadrush Sharia and entered Qari Muslehuddin in his Bay'ah during 1358 AH. At the age of 29, in 1946, Muhammad Amjad Ali Azami conferred khilafah upon him thus giving him permission to speak on behalf of the Qadiriyya Order.

== Pakistan Movement ==
During the Pakistan Movement, Siddiqui was among the scholars who sided with Muhammad Ali Jinnah and the Muslim League, on the platform of "All India Sunni Conference" held at Banaras in 1946.

== Migration to Pakistan ==
Siddiqui later went back to Karachi and joined his previously left position of Khatib in Akhond Masjid situated in Kharadar, soon after this he was requested to join Khori Garden Masjid situated at Jodia Bazar. He also corresponded with "Madarsa Qadiriyya" located in Baghdad to send many Pakistani students for higher studies.

== Death ==
He died on 23 March 1983 and is buried in Khori Garden, Kharadar.

Mazar Qari Muslehuddin Siddiqui

== See also ==
- Ahmad Raza Khan
- Hamid Raza Khan
- Ilyas Attar Qadri
- Jamaat Ahle Sunnat
- Mustafa Raza Khan
