= Sibtain Raza Khan =

Indian Sufi saint

- Title: Ameen-e-Shari'at

Personal life
- Born: 2 November 1927 Saudagran Mohalla, Bareilly, Uttar Pradesh
- Died: 9 November 2015 (aged 88) Bareilly, Uttar Pradesh
- Resting place: Kankar Tola, Bareilly, Uttar Pradesh
- Children: Mufti Salman Raza Khan, Mufti Noman Raza Khan
- Parent: Mufti Hasnain Raza Khan (father)
- Era: Modern Era
- Region: South Asia
- Known for: Mazameen-e-Ameen-e-Shariat

Religious life
- Religion: Islam
- Denomination: Sunni
- Jurisprudence: Hanafi
- Creed: Maturidi
- Movement: Barelvi

Muslim leader
- Influenced by: Ahmed Raza Khan Barelvi

Mufti Sibtain Raza Khan (2 November 1927 – 9 November 2015) also known as Ameen-e-Shari'at (Protector of Shariah) was an Islamic scholar, Sufi, author and Islamic Poet from India. He was the grandson of Hassan Raza Khan. He is known for writing the Mazameen-e-Ameen-e-Shariat.

== Early life and education ==
Mufti Sibtain Raza Khan was born to Mufti Hasnain Raza Khan Quadri son of Hassan Raza Khan younger brother of Ahmad Raza Khan on 2 November 1927.

Raza Khan attained most of his early education from his father Hasnain Raza Khan and spiritually from Mustafa Raza Khan. He studied various branches of knowledge under the guidance of great personalities of that time like Sadr al-Shariah Amjad Ali Aazmi, Mohaddis e Azam Pakistan Maulana Sardar Ahmed Khan, Moulana Qazi Shamsuddin, Shiekh al-Hadees Ghulam Muhammad Yaeen Poornavi

== Later life and legacy ==
Sibtain Raza has spend nearly 52 years of his life in Chhattisgarh and other southern area by providing various Islamic services to the Muslim Community. Many religious institutions have been named after his death. He died at the age of 93 on 9 November 2015. His Urs festival is celebrated annually, which is marked by various religious programmes.
