= Naqi Ali Khan =

19th century Indian scholar

Naqi Ali Khan نقی علی خان
- Title: Mufti

Personal life
- Born: 1830 Bareilly, North-Western Provinces, British India
- Died: 1880 UP, India
- Resting place: Bareilly Sharif Dargah, Bareilly, Uttar Pradesh
- Parent: Maulana Raza Ali Khan (father)
- Era: Modern era
- Region: South Asia
- Main interest(s): Islamic theology, Hanafi jurisprudence, Tasawwuf

Religious life
- Religion: Islam
- Denomination: Sunni
- Jurisprudence: Hanafi
- Tariqa: Qadri, Chishti, Soharwardi, Naqshbandi
- Creed: Maturidi

Muslim leader
- Successor: Ahmed Raza Khan
- Influenced by: Abu Hanifa, Abdul Qadir Jilani

Naqi Ali Khan (Urdu: نقی علی خان, romanized: Naqī ʿAlī Khān; 1830–1880) was an Indian Islamic scholar and father of Ahmad Raza Khan. Naqi Ali wrote 26 books on Seerah and Sunni Hanafi Aqidah and he issued many Fatwas.

== Family tree ==
Naqi Ali Khan
Ahmed Raza Khan	Hassan Raza Khan
Hamid Raza Khan	Mustafa Raza Khan	Hussain Raza Khan	Hasnain Raza Khan
Ibrahim Raza Khan
Akhtar Raza Khan
Asjad Raza Khan

== Publications ==
- Asool Ul Rishaad Luqma Muban Il Fasad (اصول الرشاد لقمع مباني الفساد)
- Fazayle E Dua (فضائل دعا)
- Tafsir e Surah Alamnashrah Explanation of Ayat (تفسیر سورہ الم نشرخ).

== See also ==
- Ahmed Raza Khan
- Maulana Kaif Raza Khan
