= Mufti Ashfaq Hussain Naeemi =

Indian Hanafi Islamic scholar, jurist, theologian, and Sufi (1921–2013).

Mufti Mufti Ashfaq Hussain Naeemi
- مفتی اشفاق حسین نعیمی
- Born: 19 December 1921; Amroha, United Provinces, British India
- Died: 15 October 2013 (aged 91); Chaukhan Sharif, Jodhpur, Rajasthan, India
- Resting place: Chaukhan Sharif, Jodhpur, Rajasthan
- Other name: Mufti-e-Azam Rajasthan
- Occupations: Islamic scholar, Mufti
- Years active: c. 1948–2013
- Known for: Islamic jurisprudence, issuing fatwas.
- Notable work: Ikhtiyarat-e-Mustafa; Shafaat-e-Mustafa; Fatawa-e-Mufti-e-Azam Rajasthan
- Movement: Barelvi movement

Personal life
- Education: Ajmal-ul-Uloom

Religious life
- Religion: Islam
- Denomination: Sunni
- Jurisprudence: Hanafi
- Creed: Maturidi
- Movement: Barelvi

Muslim leader
- Teacher: Mustafa Raza Khan

Mufti Ashfaq Hussain Naeemi (19 December 1921 – 15 October 2013) was an Indian Sunni Islamic scholar, jurist and mufti associated with the Barelvi movement. He was widely known by the honorific title Mufti-e-Azam Rajasthan and served as one of the leading Hanafi muftis of Rajasthan during the twentieth century.

== Education ==
Naeemi pursued his traditional Islamic education at Madrasa Ajmal-ul-Uloom under Allama Ajmal Hussain Sambhali. He later completed advanced studies in Islamic jurisprudence (fiqh), hadith, tafsir and Arabic sciences. He also benefited from the scholarly guidance of Mustafa Raza Khan, the son and successor of Ahmed Raza Khan Barelvi, his other teacher includes Mohaddise azam e hind.

== Works ==
Among the works attributed to Naeemi are:

- Ikhtiyarat-e-Mustafa
- Shafaat-e-Mustafa
- Fatawa-e-Mufti-e-Azam Rajasthan

== Death ==
Naeemi died on 15 October 2013 (9 Dhu al-Hijjah 1434 AH) at Chaukhan Sharif, Jodhpur, Rajasthan. He was buried there, and his annual urs is commemorated on 9 Dhu al-Hijjah.

== See also ==
- Ahmed Raza Khan Barelvi
- Mustafa Raza Khan
- Barelvi movement
- Hanafi
