= Bareilly ka Jhumka =

City in Uttar Pradesh, India

Bareilly Ka Jhumka is located on NH 24 Road at Dhantiya Tirahe (Uttar Pradesh, India), which has been built by BDA after almost 50 years. It remains a center of attraction for tourists visiting the city. A 2 quintal (200 kg) jhumka is mounted on a 14 ft high pole. Brass and copper have been used to make it. It is being said that the cost has come to around Rs 18 lakh. It has been prepared by an artist from Gurgaon.

== History ==
Bollywood actress Sadhna played the song 'Jhumka Gira Re, Bareilly Ke Bazar Mein' so well that it became a topic of discussion among the people and Bareilly and Jhumka have become each other's identity. Sunil Dutt and Sadhana played the lead roles in the film 'Mera Saaya'. This song was sung by Asha Bhosle.

== See also ==
- Dargah Tajushshariya
- Bareilly district
- Bareilly division
- Bareilly Sharif Dargah
- Bareilly ki Barfi
- Bareilly College
