= Razvi =

Razvi or Razavi is the surname of the following people, most of them are the followers of the Imam Ahmed Raza Khan Barelvi. People acquired the surname Razavi or Razvi or Rizvi that shows their connection with Ahmed Raza Khan Barelvi.

- Acen Razvi, English breakbeat music producer
- Asif Iqbal Razvi (born 1943), Pakistani cricketer
- Kasim Razvi (1902–1970), Indian politician
- Murtaza Razvi (1964–2012), Pakistani journalist
- Khadim Hussain Rizvi (1966–2020), Pakistani Barelvi cleric
- Saad Hussain Rizvi, Pakistani Barelvi cleric
- Shahabuddin Razvi, Indian Barelvi cleric
- Ziaul Mustafa Razvi Qadri (born 1935), Deputy Grand Mufti of India
- Muhammad Ibrahim Raza Khan Qadri Razvi (1907–1965), leader of Sunni Muslim
- Zubair Razvi, Indian poet (1935–2016)

== See also ==
- Razvily, Russian locality in Perm Krai
