= Husamul Haramain =

1906 book by Ahmad Raza Khan

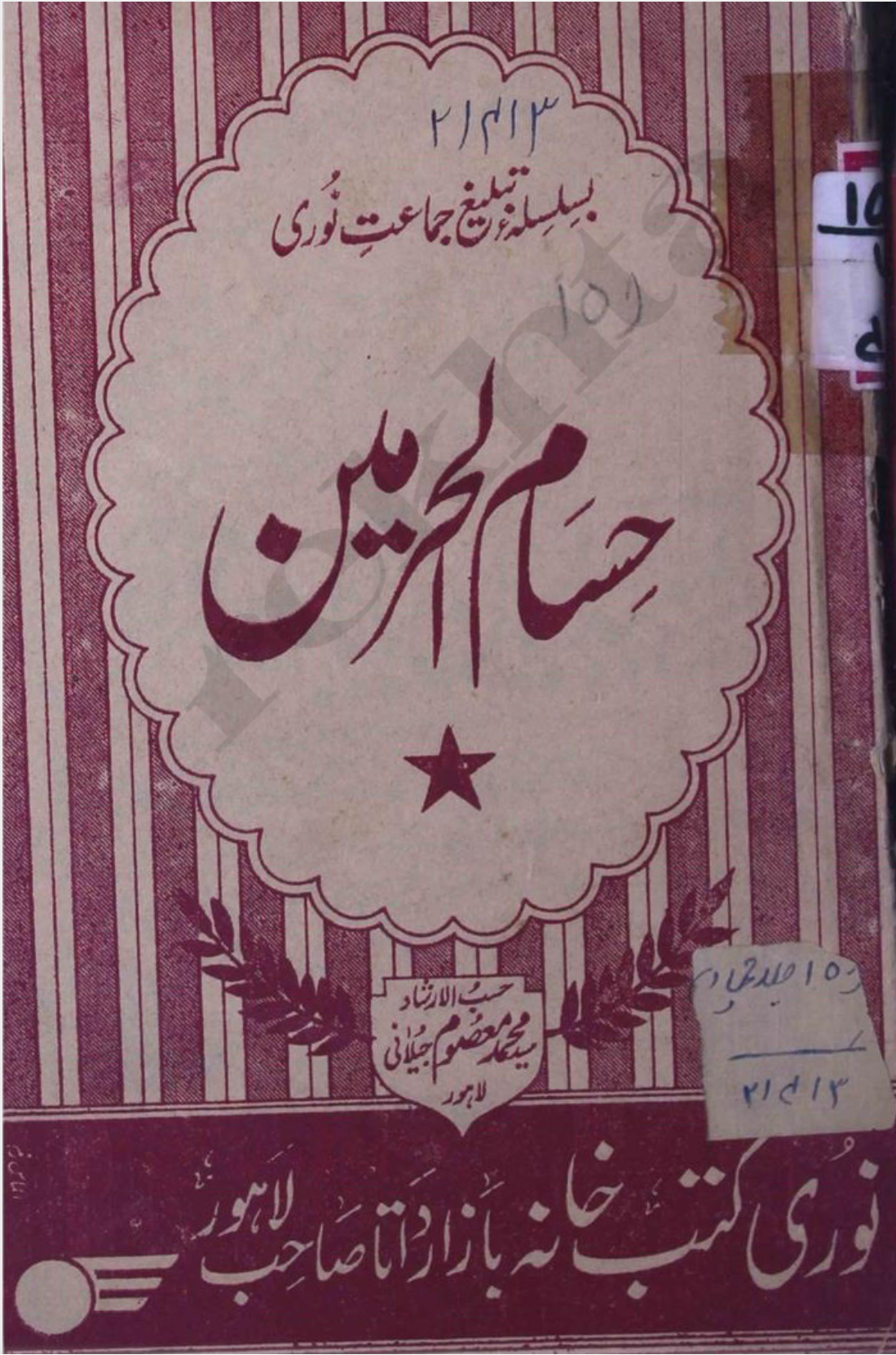
- The 1906 Cover of Husamul Haramain
- Author: Ahmed Raza Khan Barelvi
- Language: Arabic, Urdu, Hindi, English
- Genre: Religious
- Publisher: Raza Academy; Imam Ahmed Raza Academy
- Publication date: 1906
- Publication place: India

Husamul Haramain (Ḥusām al-Haramayn) or Husam al Harmain Ala Munhir kufr wal mayn (The Sword of the Two Holy Mosques to the throats of non-believers) 1906, is a treatise written by Ahmad Raza Khan (1856- 1921) which declared the founders of the Deobandi, Ahle Hadith and Ahmadiyya movements as heretics.

The treatise is published in Arabic, Urdu, English, Turkish and in Hindi language and its pledge is mandatory in Al Jamiatul Ashrafia.

== History ==
In 1905, Khan performed pilgrimage to Holy Sites in the Hejaz. During this period, he prepared a draft document entitled "al-Motamad al-Mustanad" (The Reliable Proofs) in which he argued against opinions of founders of Deobandi, Ahl-e Hadith and Ahmadiyya movements for presentation to his contemporaries in Mecca and Medina. Khan collected scholarly opinions of thirty-three fellow scholars' verdicts. All of them concurred with his assertion that the founders of Deobandi, Ahmadiyya and Ahl-e Hadith movements were apostate and blasphemers. They also exhorted the government of British India to execute the founders of those movements for heresy.

The fatwa deals separately regarding each of the following:

=== Deobandi ===
The major Deobandi scholars Muhammad Qasim Nanautawi, Rashid Ahmad Gangohi and Ashraf Ali Thanwi were stated as infidels allegedly for producing blasphemous texts against Allah, Muhammad and the Awliya. Khalil Ahmed Saharanpuri then compiled a set of questions and answers and took signatures from various scholars at Darul Uloom Deoband entitled Al-Muhannad ala al-Mufannad and submitted it to scholars of Makkah and Madinah. The book consisted of agreed upon creeds of Deobandi scholars .

=== Ahmadiyya ===
Mirza Ghulam Qadiyani, the founder of Ahmadi movement stated as being outside the fold of Islam due to supposed violation of the belief regarding the Finality of Prophethood of Muhammad.

== See also ==
- Fatawa-e-Alamgiri
- Fatawa-e-Razvia
