= Shah Turab-ul-Haq =

Sunni Muslim scholar from Pakistan

Shah Turab-ul-Haq Qadiri Razavi

Personal life
- Born: 15 September 1944 (27 Ramadan 1363 AH) Hyderabad, Hyderabad Deccan, British India
- Died: 6 October 2016 (4 Muharram 1438 AH) Karachi, Sindh, Pakistan
- Resting place: Jama Memon Masjid, Muslehuddin Garden
- Occupation: Religious scholar, President of Jamaat Ahle Sunnat

Religious life
- Religion: Islam
- Denomination: Sunni
- Jurisprudence: Hanafi
- Tariqa: Qadiriyya
- Creed: Maturidi
- Movement: Barelvi

Shah Turab ul Haq Qadri (15 September 1944 – 6 October 2016) (Urdu: شاہ تراب الحق قادری) was a Sunni Muslim scholar, preacher and politician from Hyderabad who represented the Sufi Barelvi movement in Karachi, Pakistan. He was the main leader of Jamaat Ahle Sunnat, a Sunni organisation in Pakistan.

== Family and education ==
Shah Turab ul Haq was born in 1944 in Hyderabad, India, and his family migrated to Pakistan after the Partition. His father was Shah Syed Hussain Qadri, who belongs to Syed family and his mother belongs to Farooqui family. Shah became a disciple of Mustafa Raza Khan Qadri in 1962 and visited Bareilly in 1968. He was educated at Darul Uloom Amjadia in Karachi.

== Career ==
=== Political career ===
He has served in various capacities in government including the education sector. He began his political career by contesting the local government elections for the seat of Councillor and served from 1985 to 1988 as a member of the National Assembly of Pakistan.

=== Religious leadership ===
Shah created religious schools and organizations, as well as a NGO to help Sunni Muslims. He became the direct Khalifa of Mustafa Raza Khan Qadri (the son of Ahmed Raza Khan Barelvi) and the leader of the Jamaat Ahle Sunnat.

He was associated with Tehreek-e-Nizam-e-Mustafa and Majlis-e-Tahaffuz-e-Khatme Nabuwwat. He was manager of Darul Uloom Amjadia Rizvia (Karachi), a prominent Sunni institution of higher learning, president of the Madaris Ahle Sunnat, Karachi, member of Karachi Intermediate Board and Ruet-e-Hilal Committee. He was also the Khalifa of his father-in-law, Muhammad Muslehuddin Siddiqui and granted his khilafat to his son Shah Abdul Haq Qadri noori and Allama Hafiz Muhammad Asif Qadri, Islamabad.

== Works ==
Shah Turab ul Haq’s books include:

- Zia ul hadees
- Jamal a Mustafa
- Tassawuf O Tareeqat
- Dawat O Tanzeem
- Falha E Dareen
- Khwateen Aur Deene Masaill
- Kitab us Salat
- Masnoon Duain
- Tafseer A Surah Fateh
- Islami Aqaid
- Huzoor ki Bacho Say Muhabat
- Sana a Sarkar
- Mazarat a Aulia Aur Tawassul
- Imam Azam
- Fazail a Sahaba Aur Ahle Bait
- Tehreek Pakistan May Ulma Ahlesunnat Kakirdar
- Rasool-e-Khuda Ki Namaz
- Haj ka Masnoon Tareeqa

== Death ==
He died in Karachi on 6 October 2016 at the age of 72. The funeral prayer was led by Syed Shah Abdul Haq Qadri followed by prayers from chief of Jamaat Ahle Sunnat, Mazhar Saeed Kazmi, and Muhammad Muneeb ur Rehman. The Prime Minister of Pakistan, Muhammad Nawaz Sharif, expressed his condolences, noting his contributions as a political figure who played a positive role in the democratic norms of the country which would be remembered with respect and appreciation. Bilawal Bhutto Zardari stated: “The demise of renowned religious scholar Allama Shah Turab-ul-Haq Qadri has created a big vacuum, which could hardly be filled in near future.”
