= Jamiatur Raza =

Islamic seminary in Bareilly, India

The Center of Islamic Studies Jamiatur Raza
- مرکزالدراسات الاسلامیہ جامعۃ الرضا
- Jamiatur Raza Logo
- Other names: Jamiatur Raza
- Motto: امت مسلمہ کی نئی نسل ، خاص طور پر سنی مسلم (اہل سنت والجماعت {بریلوی}) کے لیے ایک جگہ پر جدید اور اسلامی تعلیم فراہم کرنا۔
- Motto in English: To provide the Modern and Islamic Education at one place for the new generation of Muslim Ummah, Specially Sunni Muslim (Ahle Sunnah Wal Jama'ah{Barelvi})
- Type: Islamic university
- Established: 24th Safarul Muzaffar, 1421 Hijri 29 May 2000 (26 years ago)
- Founders: Akhtar Raza Khan
- Parent institution: Managed and Run by Imam Ahmed Raza Trust, Bareilly
- Affiliations: U.P. Board of Madrasa Education, National Institute of Open Schooling (NIOS) -Noida, Uttar Pradesh, India; Al-Azhar University - Cairo, Egypt.
- Religious affiliation: Sunni Islam (Barelvi)
- Chairman: Tajush Shari'ah Mufti Muhammad Akhtar Raza Khan Qadri Razvi
- Director: Mufti Muhammad Asjad Raza Khan Qadri Razvi Noori
- Students: Approx. - 2000+
- Location: Jamiatur Raza, Markaz Nagar, Mathurapur, C B Ganj, Bareilly, Uttar Pradesh, 243502, India
- Website: Jamiatur Raza CIS Jamiatur Raza
- Jamiatur Raza Hostel View

Jamiatur Raza is an Islamic seminary situated in Bareilly, India. It was established by Akhtar Raza Khan in 2000.

The founders have evolved a plan to develop it into an Islamic university. Presently, it is being supervised by the son of Mufti Akhtar Raza Khan, Asjad Raza Khan, who is also Chief Mufti of Sunni Muslims of India.

== About Madrasa ==
The Madrasa was established with 250 students and at present one thousand students are studying up to the level of Tahtania, Fauqania and Aalia which is approved by Madrasa Education Board. Many courses approved or recognized by the National Institute of Open Schooling (NIOS) are also taught. Master and PhD level courses in association with a Al Azhar university are being run.

== Curriculum ==
It follows following curriculum.

- Secondary Stage:

Duration three years from Class VI to VIII

- Higher Stage:

Duration 7 years. It is divided into three sub-stages:

- Molviyah Duration 2 Years (Equivalent High School)
- Aalimah - Duration 2 Years (Equivalent Inter Mediate)
- Fadeelah - Duration 3 Years (Equivalent Graduation)

=== Department of Specialization ===
It offers specialization in Fiqh, Tafseer, Hadith, Arabic literature, World Religion

=== Department of Memorization of the Quran and Its Recitation ===
Three years course of Quran

=== Method of study ===
The syllabus is based on Arabic and Persian but our syllabus is combination of Islamic issues Arabic, Persian and Modern Education also.

=== Fatwa issuance ===
The Jamiatur Raza had a indifferent part named Markazi Darul Ifta which is the Fatwa department of the University.

== See also ==
- List of Islamic educational institutions
- Barelvi
- Ahmed Raza Khan
- Manzar-e-Islam
- Al Jamiatul Ashrafia
- Al-Jame-atul-Islamia
