= Usha Sanyal =

Indian scholar and historian

- Born: India

Academic background
- Education: Columbia University; University of Kent; Delhi University
- Thesis: In the Path of the Prophet: Maulana Ahmad Riza Khan Barelwi and the Ahl-e Sunnat wa Jamaat Movement in British India, c. 1870-1921

Academic work
- Discipline: History
- Sub-discipline: Southeast Asia
- Institutions: Wingate University

Usha Sanyal is an Indian historian and scholar of Islam whose work focuses on South Asian Islam, particularly the Barelvi movement, Islamic education, devotional practice, and Muslim women's religious life. Her doctoral research at Columbia University examined Ahmed Raza Khan Barelvi and the Ahl-e Sunnat movement.

Her books include Devotional Islam and Politics in British India: Ahmad Riza Khan Barelwi and His Movement, 1870–1920, Ahmad Riza Khan: In the Path of the Prophet, and Scholars of Faith: South Asian Muslim Women and the Embodiment of Religious Knowledge. She has also written and edited works on Muslim communities, madrasas, Sufi practice, religious authority, and women's Islamic education in South Asia.

== Education ==
Sanyal graduated with a BA (Honors) in sociology with a minor in economics from Delhi University, India and an MA in Southeast Asian studies from the University of Kent at Canterbury, UK. Her M Phil. in South Asian and Southeast Asian history, was done from Columbia University. She also completed a Ph.D. in history from the Columbia University in 1990.

== Languages ==
Sanyal's research includes a knowledge of the English, French, and Hindi-Urdu Languages.

== Works ==
Sanyal has authored five books:

- Scholars of Faith: South Asian Muslim Women and the Embodiment of Religious Knowledge, Oxford University Press.
- Food, Faith and Gender in South Asia: The Cultural Politics of Women's Food Practices (Criminal Practice Series), editor, with Nita Kumar, 2020 Bloomsbury Academic (20 February 2020).
- Muslim Voices: Community and Self in South Asia (New Perspectives on Indian Pasts) with David Gilmartin, and Sandria Freitag, eds. Delhi: Yoda Press, 2013.
- Devotional Islam and Politics in British India: Ahmad Riza Khan Barelwi and His Movement, 1870-1920. 1st & 2nd editions. New York and Delhi: Oxford University Press, 1999. 3rd edition. Delhi:Yoda Press, 2010 (Urdu Translation in 2013)
- Ahmed Raza Khan: In the Path of the Prophet. Oxford: Oneworld Publications. 2005

Devotional Islam and Politics in British India received a positive review from the scholar and translator of South Asian literature Aditya Behl in The Journal of Religion. He described it as "a well-researched and welcome addition to the literature on Islamic reform in colonial India".

Her articles include:

- "South Asian Islamic Education in the Pre-Colonial, Colonial, and Postcolonial Periods" In Global Education Systems. Handbook of Education Systems in South Asia, eds. Padma M. Sarangapani and Rekha Pappu (Forthcoming, Springer Nature India)
- "Sufism through the Prism of Shari‘a: A Reformist Barelwi Girls’ Madrasa in Uttar Pradesh, India" In Katherine P. Ewing and Rosemary Corbett, eds., Modern Sufis and the State: Rethinking Islam and Politics in South Asia and Beyond (Columbia University Press, forthcoming).
- "Discipline and Nurture: Living in a Girls’ Madrasa, Living in Community," co-authored with Sumbul Farah, in Modern Asian Studies (2018)
- "Al-Huda International: How Muslim Women Empower Themselves through Online Study of the Qur’an," in Hawwa: Journal of Women of the Middle East and the Islamic World (2015) 13(3): 449–460.
- "Changing Concepts of the Person in Two Ahl-e Sunnat/Barelwi Texts for Women: The Sunni Bihishti Zewar and Jannati Zewar, in Usha Sanyal, David Gilmartin, and Sandria Freitag, eds., Muslim Voices: Community and the Self in South Asia, eds. Usha Sanyal, David Gilmartin, and Sandria Freitag (New Delhi: Yoda Press. 2013)
- "Barelwis." In The Encyclopaedia of Islam, 3rd ed., pp. 94–99. Leiden: E. J. Brill, 2011.
- "Sufi Ritual Practice among the Barkatiyya Sayyids of U.P.: Nuri Miyan’s Life and Urs, Late Nineteenth – Early Twentieth Centuries." In Barbara D. Metcalf, ed., Islam in South Asia in Practice. Series ed. Donald S. Lopez, Jr. Princeton University Press, 2009.
- "Ahl-i Sunnat Madrasas: The Madrasa Manzar-i Islam, Bareilly, and Jamia Ashrafiyya, Mubarakpur." In Jamal Malik ed., Madrasas in South Asia. Routledge, 2008.
- "Ahmad Riza Khan Barelwi." Encyclopedia of Islam, 3rd edition. Leiden: E. J. Brill, 2007.
- "Tourists, Pilgrims and Saints:The Shrine of Mu`in al-Din Chishti of Ajmer" In Carol Henderson and Maxine Weisgrau, eds., Raj Rhapsodies: Tourism, Heritage and the Seduction of History. Ashgate Publishing Ltd., U.K., 2007.
- "Barelwis." In Jane D. McAuliffe, ed., Encyclopedia of the Quran, vol. 1, pp. 201–203. Leiden:E. J. Brill, 2002.
- "The [Re-]Construction of South Asian Muslim Identity in Queens, New York." In Carla Petievich, ed., The Expanding Landscape: South Asians and the Diaspora, pp. 141–152. New Delhi: Manohar, 1999.
- "Generational Changes in the Leadership of the Ahl-e Sunnat Movement in North India during the Twentieth Century." Modern Asian Studies 32, 3 (1998): 635–656.
- "Are Wahhabis Kafirs? Ahmad Riza Khan Barelwi and His Sword of the Haramayn." In Muhammad Khalid Masud, Brinkley Messick, and David S. Powers, eds., Islamic Legal Interpretation: Muftis and Their Fatwas, pp. 204–213. Cambridge, Mass.: Harvard University Press, 1996.
- "Barelwis." In John L. Esposito, ed., The Oxford Encyclopedia of the Modern Islamic World, vol. 1, pp. 200–203. New York: Oxford University Press, 1995.
- "Pir, Shaikh, and Prophet: The Personalization of Religious Authority in Ahmad Riza Khan’s Life." In Contributions to Indian Sociology 28, 1 (1994): 35–66. (Also published in T. N. Madan, ed., Muslim Communities of South Asia: Culture, Society, and Power, pp. 405–428. New Delhi: Manohar, 1995.)

== See also ==
- Ahmad Raza Khan
- Fatawa Razawiyyah
