= Nizamuddin Amethwi =

- Title: Shaikh

Personal life
- Born: Nizamuddin; 1493 Amethi, Lucknow, Awadh
- Died: 1571 (aged 77–78) Gopamau
- Resting place: Amethi
- Notable work: Teaching

Religious life
- Religion: Islam
- Order: Chishti Order
- School: Sufi
- Lineage: See the full lineage
- Profession: Teacher

Muslim leader
- Teacher: Shaikh Ma'ruf ibn Al-Waasi'

Shaikh Nizamuddin Usmani Amethwi (1493 – 1571 AD/900 – 979 AH) was an Indian Islamic scholar and spiritual Sufi saint of the Chishtiyya Sufi order. He was a descendant of the Sufi saint Shaikh Sirri as-Saqti of Baghdad.

== Lineage ==
The lineage of Amethwi is as follows:

Nizamuddin ibn Muhammad Yasin ibn Fakhruddin ibn Abul Fazal ibn Tajuddin Usmani.

== Early life and education ==
He was born in 1493 in the village of Amethi in the Lucknow district of the former Avadh state in the family of Muhammad Yasin Amethwi.

He started his primary education in his childhood. He then moved to Jaunpur and studied under Shaykh Maruf bin Abdul Waasi'. He then went to Mankapur and received Bay'ah (discipleship) in the Chishtiyya Tariqa (Chishti Order) from Nuruddin Ibn Hamid Hussaini.

== Career ==
He then returned to Jaunpur and after staying for some time returned to Amethi. In Amethi he married Makhduma Jahan, daughter of Khassah-i-Khuda Salehi and then moved to Gopamau. Then Amethvi gave his daughter in marriage to Mufti Adam Ibn Muhammad Siddiqi and stayed there for some time. He then returned to his homeland and spent his days in worship and teaching. Then he was appointed as the Shaikh.

== Death and legacy ==
He later moved to Gopamau and died there in 1571. He was buried in his birthplace Amethi. At his shrine, Tardi Beg built a large mausoleum.

His wife, Makhduma Jahan, had six children. They are Abdul Jalil, Abdul Wahhab, Abdul Waasi', Muhammad, Ahmad and Abdul Halim. Among them, Abdul Wasi, Abdul Wahhab and Abdul Jalil died during his lifetime. His second wife gave birth to a son named Jafar.
