= Al Jamiatul Ashrafia =

Sunni Islamic seminary of India

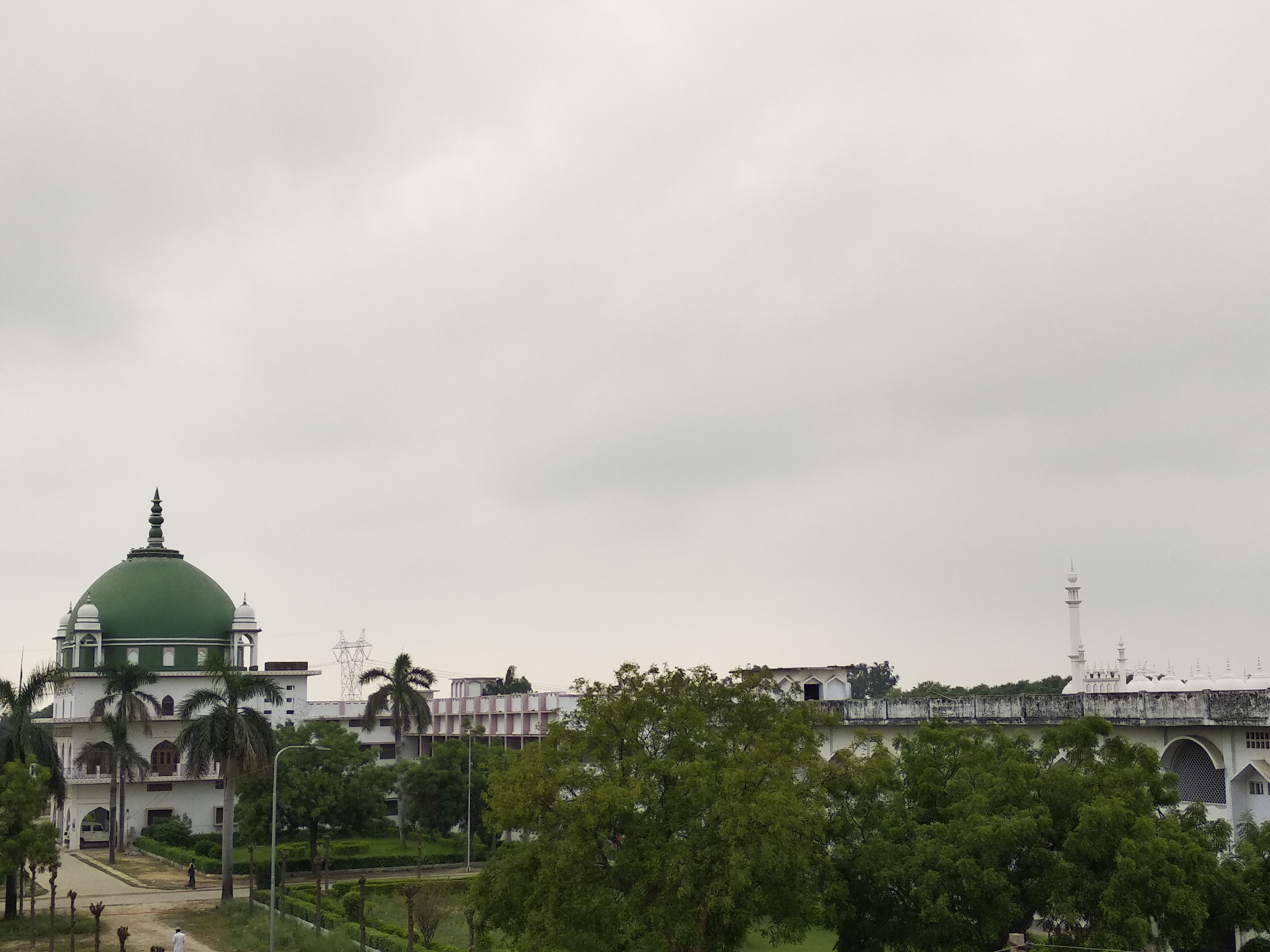
- Other names: Ashrafia
- Type: Islamic university
- Founders: Shah Abdul Azeez Muradabadi
- President: Abdul Hafeez Moradabadi
- Vice-president: Vacant
- Principal: Mufti Badr-e-Alam Misbahi
- Director: Allama Abdul Aziz Muradabadi (Hafiz-e-Millat)
- Administrative staff: 150+
- Students: c. 5500+
- Location: Mubarakpur, Azamgarh, Uttar Pradesh, India
- Website: www.aljamiatulashrafia.org

Al Jamiatul Ashrafia (Urdu: الجامعۃ اُلاشرفیہ, Hindi: अल जामियत-उल-अशरफ़िया) is a Sunni Madrasa in India. It is located in Mubarakpur in a Northern State of India, Uttar Pradesh.

== History ==
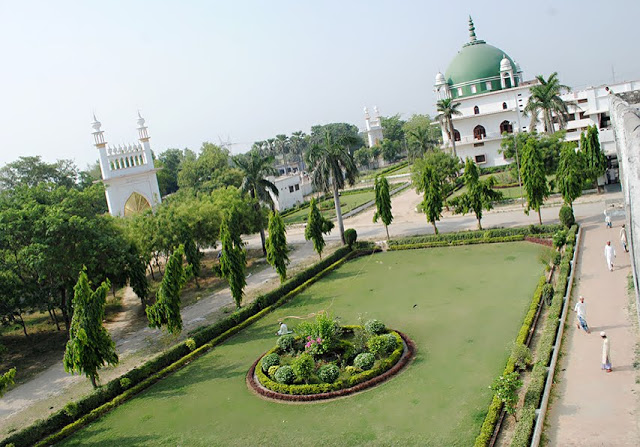
It started off as a madrasa called Misbah al-Ulum in 1898 in the town of Mubarakpur of what was then British India. It was named 'Ashrafia' after Syed Shah Ali Hussain Ashraf Kichauchhvi. After struggling for many years and moving locations several times, a new building was constructed using funds raised by Hafiz Abd al-Aziz Muradabadi. This was the site for the school now known as Dar al-Ulum Ahl-i Sunnat or Misbah al-Ulum.

Realizing that the site was becoming too small, Hafiz Abd al-Aziz organized an educational conference in May 1972 to discuss for moving Ashrafia to a larger campus. Scholars of the Barelvi movement such as Mustafa Raza Khan son of Ahmad Raza Khan along with Maulana Syed Ale Mustafa Quadri Barkati and Arshadul Qadri laid the foundation stone with the mission of making it a university for Sunni Hanafi Islam in 1972 at a site outside the city of Azamgarh. Key figures such as Allama Ziaul Mustafa Razvi Qadri, Allama Arshadul Qaudri, Allama Mumtaz Ahmad Ashraful Qadri, Mufti Abdul Mannan, Maulana Shafi, Qari Yehya and Qamaruzzaman Azmi worked with Abd al-Aziz Muradabadi to raise the required funds to build the institution.

== About the institution ==
The Jamia has 5000 plus students in religious education centers with 256 faculty members and employees. Besides them there are more than 6000 boys and girls in various educational institutions of the Jamia. The alumni are called ‘Misbahi’ according to its old name ‘Misbahul Uloom’. Mohammad Shahid Raza Khan, an alumnus of Al Jamiatul Ashrafia qualified Indian Civil Service Exam in 2019.

== Affiliation ==
The degrees of graduation and post graduation of Al Jamiatul Ashrafia are recognized by various universities including Maulana Azad National Urdu University in Hyderabad, Jawaharlal Nehru University (JNU), Jamia Millia Islamia, and Aligarh Muslim University.

== Set up of Sunni Board ==
In 1992, under the auspices of Al Jamiatul Ashrafia, Mobarakpur, the Jurisprudential Board was set up as a body of Muftis.

== See also ==
- List of Islamic educational institutions
- Karwan-I-Islami
- Jamia Nizamia
- Jamiatur Raza
- Islam in India
- Al-Jame-atul-Islamia
- Manzar-e-Islam

== Bibliographies ==
- Alam, Arshad (29 November 2020). Inside a Madrasa: Knowledge, Power and Islamic Identity in India. Taylor & Francis. ISBN 978-1-000-08366-8.
- Sanyal, Usha (2008). "Ahl-i Sunnat Madrasas: the Madrasa Manzar-i Islam, Bareilly, and Jamia Ashrafiyya, Mubarakpur". In Jamal, Malik (ed.). Madrasas in South Asia: Teaching terror?. Routledge. pp. 23–44. ISBN 9780415442473.
