= Jama'at Raza-e-Mustafa =

Sunni religious organization in India

Jamat Raza-e-Mustafa
- جماعت رضائے مصطفٰے
- Abbreviation: JRM
- Formation: 7th Rabi' al-Thani 1339; 17 December 1920; 105 years ago
- Founder: Aala Hazat Imam Ahmad Raza Khan Qadri
- Founded at: Bareilly, British India
- Type: Religious organisation, NGO
- Legal status: Active
- Purpose: Propagation of Islam and protection of rights of Sunni-Barelvi Muslims in India and protection of faith and beliefs from various other movements
- Headquarters: 82, Saudagran Mohalla, Dargah Tajush Shariah, Bareilly, Uttar Pradesh, India PIN - 243001
- Location: Bareilly, Uttar Pradesh, India
- Origins: Bareilly, Uttar Pradesh, India
- Region served: Global
- Members: 215+ Branches and Millions of Sunni Barelvi followers.
- Official languages: Urdu Hindi and English, In India's State and Others Countries: Respective Regional Languages,
- President (Sadr in Urdu language): Mufti Muhammad Asjad Raza Khan Qadri Razvi Noori, Scholar of Sunni Barelvi Movement
- Website: Jamat Raza-e-Mustafa

Jamat Raza-e-Mustafa (Urdu: جماعت رضائے مصطفٰے, Hindi: जमात-रज़ा-ए-मुस्तफ़ा) also known as JRM, is a historical organisation of Indian Sunni Barelvi Muslims associated with Sufism. It was founded by scholar and 19th-century Mujadid Ahmed Raza Khan Barelvi on 17 December 1920 in Bareilly, India, to propagate Islamic teachings in accordance with Ahle Sunnah wal Jama'ah. The self-described aim of the group is to "deny misguided sects and safeguard the beliefs (Aqaa'id) of the Ahle Sunnah wal Jama'ah."

== Book ==
The history of the organisation has been documented in the book Tareekh Jamat Raza-e-Mustafa (History of Jamaat Raza-e-Mustafa), authored by Maulana Shahabuddin Razvi Bareilvi.

== History ==
It played a significant role during Shuddhi movement which was initiated by Arya Samaj to convert Muslims into Hinduism. The Jamat Raza-e-Mustafa prevented around four hundred thousand re-conversions to Hinduism in eastern U.P and Rajasthan during its activities under anti-Shuddhi movement.

In 1917, Allama Naeem-ud-Deen Muradabadi organised the historical Jamat Raza-e-Mustafa conference at Jamia Naeemia Moradabad, a group whose mission was to curb, and if possible reverse, the tide of re-conversions threatening the Muslim community in the wake of the Shuddhi movement.

Mufti Mustafa Raza Khan was another influential leader of Jamat Raza-e-Mustafa who worked against the Shuddhi movement, which aims to convert Muslims to Hinduism in pre-Partition India. The organisation also worked for the defense of Sufi Sunni beliefs in south Asia as practiced by large numbers of people known as Barelvis. It would also act as a quasi-political organisation in opposition to the Deobandi-dominated Jamiat Ulama-e-Hind.

== Present ==
- Stand on CAA and NRC

In December 2019, following the deaths of people following a protest against the Citizenship (Amendment) Act, 2019 (CAA), Jamat wrote a letter to president Ram Nath Kovind and Yogi Adityanath, Chief Minister of Uttar Pradesh, to demand compensation for families of the victims and the injured. In January 2020 Jamat announced to hold peaceful protests till the government gives in and announces a rollback of CAA and Proposed NRC. President of Jamat Raza-e-Mustafa and Sunni Barelvi cleric Mufti Asjad Raza Khan is of the view that CAA/NRC issue is about protecting the constitutional principles and values and it is not a Hindu-Muslim issue. He also praised protesters of anti-CAA protests., Salman Raza Khan, vice president of Jamat Raza-e-Mustafa called for boycott of National Population Register if it is not on the lines of the 2011 census.

- Stand on Uniform Civil Code

The Jamat has opposed any proposed implementation of Uniform Civil Code (UCC). It is of the view that UCC will affect personal laws of not only of Muslims, but of Jain, Sikhs, Parsis and Christians communities too.

- Stand on Haj Tax by Saudi authorities

Jamat Raza-e-Mustafa opposed the Saudi Arabian government decision to impose 2,000 Riyal or Rs 36,000 as tax on second Haj in 2016.

== Leadership ==
The organisation is currently headed by Asjad Raza Khan Qadri as the President.
