= Raza Jama Masjid =

Mosque in Kolhapur, Maharashtra, India

- रजा जामा मशीद
- Location of the mosque in Maharashtra

Religion
- Affiliation: Islam
- Ecclesiastical or organizational status: Friday mosque
- Status: Active

Location
- Location: Gajapur village, Kolhapur district, Maharashtra
- Country: India
- Interactive map of Raza Jama Masjid

Architecture
- Type: Mosque architecture

The Raza Jama Masjid (Marathi: रजा जामा मशीद) is a Friday mosque, located in Gajapur Village in the Kolhapur district of the state of Maharashtra, India, located near the Vishalgad fort. The mosque was named in honour of the Ahmed Raza Khan Barelvi.

== 2024 attack ==
On 14 July 2024, a Hindutva mob attacked and partially destroyed the mosque and burned copies of the Quran. Witnesses reported that the assailants were shouting slogans of Jai Shri Ram. All India Majlis Ittehadul Muslemeen President Asaduddin Owaisi condemned the attack on the mosque and criticised Devendra Fadnavis and Maharashtra Chief Minister Eknath Shinde by referring to December 6, the day when Babri Masjid was demolished. On 15 July 2024, Kolhapur police filed a case against over 500 people, including former Rajya Sabha MP Sambhaji Raje. The police detained 21 people.

== See also ==
- Islam in India
- List of mosques in India
