= Hadaiq e Bakhshish =

Poetic work compiled by Ahmad Raza Khan

- Author: Ahmad Raza Khan
- Translator: Hazem Mohammad Mahfuz (in Arabic); Muhammad Afthab Cassim Qaadiri Razvi Noori (in English); Hafiz Anisuzzaman (in Bengali)
- Language: Urdu (original), English, Persian and Bengali (translated)
- Subject: Na'at, Hamd, Mankabat, Qasida, Salam
- Publisher: In Urdu: Hossaini Press, Bareilly, India; Maktabatul Madina (Dawat e Islami), Bangladesh and Pakistan; In English: Imam Mustafa Raza Research Centre, Durban, South Africa; In Bengali: Ala Hazrat Foundation, Bangladesh
- Publication date: 1907
- Publication place: British India

Hada'iq-i Bakhshish (Urdu: حدائق بخشش, romanized: Ḥadāʾiq-i Bakhshish, lit. 'Garden of Mercy') is a poetic work composed by Indian Islamic scholar Ahmad Raza Khan. Its first part was compiled in 1907 (1325 Hijri). According to research so far, its first two volumes were published in 1926. Apart from Urdu, some verses in this collection are in Persian and Arabic. Among the famous naʽats included in it are Qasida-e-Noor, Qasida-e Meraziya, Mustafa Jaane Rahmat Pe Lakho Salam, Sabse Awla O Ala Hamara Nabi, Lam Yati Naziru Kafi Nazareen etc. Naats of Hadaiq e Bakhshish have been translated into many languages as well as English, Arabic, Persian and Bengali. Many explanations have been written about this poem. Many poets have praised this book. Salam e Reza and Qasida e Noor are the most praised Kalams of this book.

The first and second parts are considered to be part of the original version by everyone. But the third part is disputed. It contains a total of 81 poems in first two parts.

== Nomenclature ==
This book was historically compiled in 1325 Hijri (1907) under the name Diwan Hadaiq e Bakhshish. Here the word Hadaiq means garden and the word Bakhshish means mercy or forgiveness. In that regard, the title of this book is considered to mean garden of mercy.
