= Shah Al-i Rasul =

Indian Islamic scholar (1795–1879)

- شاہ آل رسول

Personal life
- Born: February 1795 Marhara, Uttar Pradesh, India
- Died: December 1879 (aged 84) Marhara, Uttar Pradesh.
- Resting place: Sharif Khanqah, Marhara, Uttar Pradesh.
- Citizenship: British Indian
- Era: Modern era
- Region: South Asia

Religious life
- Religion: Islam
- Denomination: Sunni
- Jurisprudence: Hanafi
- Tariqa: Qadiri

Muslim leader
- Students: Ahmad Raza Khan

Shah Al-i Rasul (Urdu: شاہ آل رسول, romanized: Shāh Āl-i Rasūl; February 1795 – December 1879) also known as Syed Shah Aale Rasool Marehrawi was an Indian Islamic scholar and a teacher of Ahmed Raza Khan Barelvi. He is considered the 37th imam of the Qadiri order in South Asia. His title was Khatam al-Akbar.

== Biography ==
He belonged to Marehra, Uttar Pradesh. Shah Al-i Rasul's father was Shah Al-i Barkat. He studied religious studies from his father; besides he learned religious sciences from Ainul Haq Shah Abdul Majeed Badayuni, Maulana Shah Salast Allah Kashfi Badayuni, Maulana Anwar Sahib Firangi Mahali, Hazrat Shah Noorul Haq Lakhnavi and Maulana Abdul Wasa. He also participated in the lectures of Shah Abd al-Aziz and obtained a certificate of hadith. Shah Al-i Rasul's shrine is in Sharif Khanqah Barkatia Marhara Sharif, Uttar Pradesh.

=== Khilafat ===
His khilafat is as follows.

- Ghaus Azam Syedna Sheikh Abdul Qadir Jilani
- Sayyid Abdul Razzaq Qadri
- Abu Salih Abdullah Nasr
- Muhyiddin
- Sayyid Ali Baghdadi
- Sayyid Musa
- Sayyid Shaykh Hasan Baghdadi
- Sayyid Ahmad Jilani
- Sheikh Bahauddin
- Sayyid Ibrahim Erji
- Mohammad Nizamuddin Bhikari
- Qazi Ziauddin
- Sayyid Shah Jamal Auliya
- Sayyid Muhammad Kalpoi
- Sayyid Ahmed Kalpoi
- Sayyid Fazlullah
- Sayyid Barkatullah
- Sayyid Al-Muhammad
- Shah Hamza
- Sayyid Shah Syed Al Ahmed Achhe Mian
- Sayyid Shah Al Rasul
