= Urs festival, Ajmer =

Annual festival held at Ajmer, Rajasthan, India

Coordinates: 26.4563°N 74.6281°E

Minister of State Prithviraj Chavan carrying the 'Chadar' on behalf of Prime Minister Manmohan Singh, to be laid at the Dargah of Khwaja Moinuddin Hasan Chisti, in 2004

The Urs festival is an annual festival held at Ajmer, Rajasthan, India which commemorates the anniversary of the death of Sufi saint Moinuddin Chishti (1143 - 1236) (founder of the Chishtiya Sufi order in India).

This Sufi saint preached tolerance of all religions and gave a message of love. He was popularly known as 'Khwaja Gharib Nawaz' (Messiah of the poor).

== The festival ==
This Urs festival is held over six days and features night-long dhikr (zikr) qawwali singing. The anniversary is celebrated in the seventh month of the Islamic lunar calendar. Hundreds of thousands of pilgrims, many from foreign countries, visit the shrine from all over India. The Indian Railways run special trains during his festival to bring devotees to Ajmer.

At the start of this annual festival, the hoisting of the historical flag and a 21-gun salute ceremony is held at Chishti's mausoleum since 1944. The sixth day of the Urs is regarded as the most special and auspicious. It is called "Chhati Sharif". It is celebrated on the 6th Rajab between 10:00 A.M. and 1:30 p.m. inside the Mazaar Sharif or shrine complex. Shijra, or the genealogical tree associated with the Chishti Order, is read by duty bound Khadims of Moinuddin Chishti, and then there is Fariyad (prayers).

Just before the Qu'l (conclusion of Chhati Sharif), Badhaawa (a poem of praise) is sung at the main entrance of the shrine by Qawwals.

Badhaawa is a recitation accompanied only by clapping; no musical instrument is played. It was composed by Syed Behlol Chishty, an ancestor of the present day Chishty Sufis of Ajmer Sharif called Syedzadgan Khadim Khwaja Sahib. After its recitation, the ceremony of the Qu'l comes to an end, and Fatiha is recited. The end of the ceremony is marked by firing a cannon at 1:30 p.m.
