= Urs-e-Razavi =

Islamic event

Urs-e-Razvi
- Official name: Urs-e-Razvi
- Observed by: Sufi Sunni Muslims
- Significance: death anniversary of Imam Ahmad Raza Qadri
- Observances: Marches, Mehfil-e-Milad, Ghusl of Dargah, Speeches by scholars, Dua and Zikr.
- Begins: 23 Safar
- Ends: 25 Safar
- Duration: 3 days
- Frequency: Annual/lunar (every 25 lunations)
- Related to: Ahmed Raza Khan

Urs-e-Rizawi, also known as Urs-e-Ala Hazrat, (Urdu: عرس اعلی حضرت) is a 3 day long annual event commemorating the death anniversary of Imam Ahmad Raza Khan organized at the Dargah Ala Hazrat. recently Islamic Research Center showed 3 years of survey on Urs-e-Razvi, WPNEWS18 published these articles. It largely attracts followers of Sufism, where scholars discuss Ahmad Raza Khan's contribution in reforming Sufism in India. In recent times, it has acted as a platform for clerics to guide their followers, which usually involves discussion over Islamic teachings and methodologies. A recent trend has been the discussion of socio-economic issues concerning the subcontinent's Muslims, such as the recent supreme court of India verdict regarding Triple Talaq or raising awareness about the deteriorating socio-economic conditions of the Muslim community.

== Chadar Peshi ==
The Chadar Peshi is a ceremony in which a Chadar is placed on a tomb and is presented by different people across the world as a tribute and honor. Turkish President Recep Tayyip Erdoğan sent the gifts and Chadar for the Dargah in 2016.

== Urs in other countries ==
Because the crowds became too large, the Dargah officials distributed the Urs celebration among other countries, including Pakistan, Bangladesh, mauritius, the United Kingdom, South Africa the United States, and Turkey.
