= Razvily =

Razvily Развилы
- Village
- Location within Perm Krai Location within Russia
- Coordinates: 57°32′N 54°28′E
- Country: Russia
- Region: Perm Krai
- District: Bolshesosnovsky District
- Time zone: UTC+5:00

Razvily (Russian: Развилы) is a rural locality (a village) in Toykinskoye Rural Settlement, Bolshesosnovsky District, Perm Krai, Russia. The population was 119 as of 2010. There are 4 streets.

== Geography ==
Razvily is located 23 km southwest of Bolshaya Sosnova (the district's administrative centre) by road. Krasnye Gorki is the nearest rural locality.
