= Amethi, Lucknow =

Amethi
- Town
- Location in Uttar Pradesh, India
- Coordinates: 26.76°N 81.15°E
- Country: India
- State: Uttar Pradesh
- District: Lucknow

Population (2001)
  - Total: 11,366

Languages
  - Official: Hindi
- Time zone: UTC+5:30 (IST)
- Vehicle registration: UP-32

Amethi is a town and a nagar panchayat in the Lucknow district in the Indian state of Uttar Pradesh.

== Geography ==
Amethi is located at 26.76°N 81.15°E.

== Demographics ==
As of 2001 India census, Amethi had a population of 11,366. Males constitute 53% of the population and females 47%. Amethi has an average literacy rate of 75%. In Amethi, 18% of the population is under 6 years of age.

== Notable people ==
- Hashmat Ali Khan, Islamic scholar
