= Dargah Tajush Shariah =

Indian shrine

Khanqah-E-Tajush Shariah
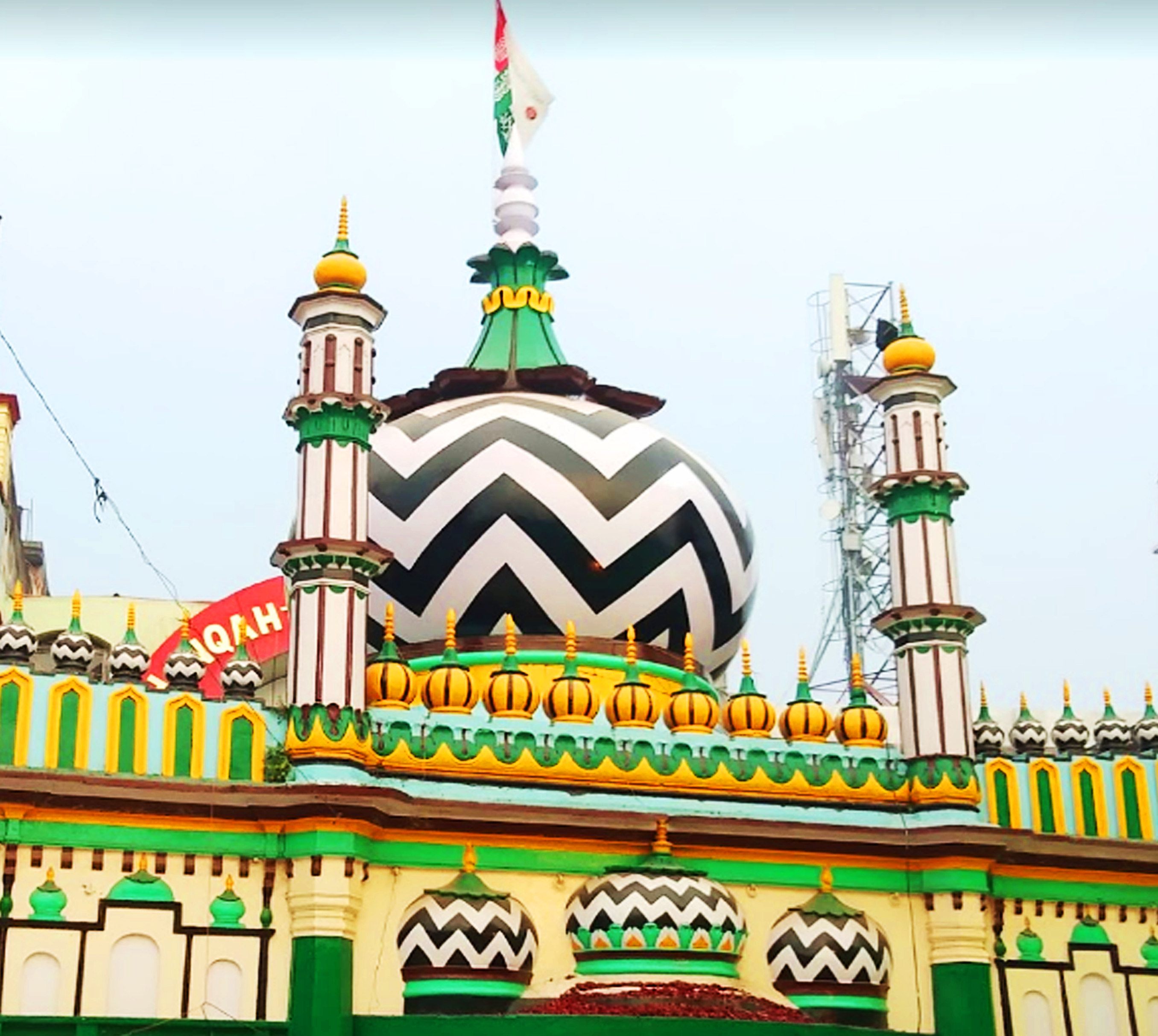

- Location within Uttar Pradesh Location within India

Religion
- Affiliation: Islam
- District: Bareilly district
- Province: Uttar Pradesh
- Ecclesiastical or organizational status: Shrine
- Ownership: Individual
- Leadership: Asjad Raza Khan (Sajjada Nashin)

Location
- Location: Bareilly
- Country: India
- Interactive map of Khanqah-E-Tajush Shariah
- Coordinates: 28°21′43″N 79°24′31″E

Architecture
- Architect: Sunni-Al-Jamaat
- Type: Mosque, Sufi mausoleum
- Style: Modern
- Established: 2018
- Completed: 2021

Specifications
- Direction of façade: West
- Shrine: 1

Khanqah-e-Tajush Shariah or Dargah Tajush Shariah is a Shrine of Akhtar Raza Khan Azhari which is a monument located near Bareilly Sharif Dargah in Bareilly city of Uttar Pradesh state, India. He had millions of followers around the world.

According to the Islamic Research Center study report, Azhari was "the only cleric in India to receive the title of 'Tajush Shariah' and one of the few prominent figures from around the world who were allowed inside the Kaaba in Mecca.

In 2014 edition of the Royal Islamic Strategic Studies Centre he was ranked 22nd in the list of 500 most influential Muslims in the world by the Center of Studies.

== Events ==
Urs-e-Tajush Shariah was celebrated with great simplicity due to Corona virus, under the banner of All India Tanzeem Ulama-e-Islam organized by Maulana Shahabuddin Razvi has been celebrated in different states and cities of the country Haji Shakil Qureshi released Rasayle Tajushshariyah book.

== See also ==
- Bareilly Sharif Dargah
