= Fatawa Razawiyyah =

Sunni Islamic compendium by Indo-Islamic scholar Ahmad Raza Khan Barelvi

Fatawa-i Razawiyya فتاویِٰ رضویہ
- Author: Ahmad Raza Khan
- Language: Urdu; Persian; Arabic; one fatwa in English
- Published: 1911 to 2005
- Publication place: India
- Pages: 30 volumes, 22000+ pages، Six thousand eight hundred forty questions and answers
- ISBN: 2-7451-7204-2 Arabic ed

Fatawa-i Razawiyya (Urdu: فتاویِٰ رضویہ, romanized: Fatāwā-i Raẓāwiyya) is a Sunni Islamic compilation of fatawa (legal edicts) of the Hanafi madhhab (school of thought) authored by a renowned Islamic scholar Ahmad Raza Khan. An influential sharia manual spanning 400 treaties and nearly 7,000 fatawa, the work is distinguished in Sufism.

The Fatawa-i Razawiyya was discussed by Arun Shourie in his book, The World of Fatwas or the Sharia in Action Its 12 volumes were first published by Ahmed Raza Khan's brother at Hasani press, and only two volumes of various Fatawa's were published during the lifetime of the author. Later published by Raza Foundation Lahore in 30 Volumes. Raza Academy was first to publish its various volumes in 1985. The Beirut-based Dar al-Imam Yusuf al-Nabhani (DIYN) publishing house is currently undertaking a complete Arabic translation of all 30 volumes.

== Books and Journals ==
It contains books and journals on legal rulings (fatawa) based on questions asked by scholars and general public in the domain of Hanafi fiqh covering a wide variety of different topics and beliefs.

Some of the books and journals included in Fatawa-i Razawiyya:

=== Book of Purification ===
This part focuses on cleanliness and ritual purification under Hanafi fiqh and contains around 239 fatawa. It has around 29 Journals which are:

1. Awareness that the fatawa are based on the opinion of the Imam.
2. Pillars of ablution
3. Using cloth for drying after ablution
4. Mucus dripping doesn't invalidate the ablution
5. Rulings under which blood invalidates the ablution
6. Which type of sleep invalides the ablution
7. Summary of issues faced in ablution
8. Ruling and causes of nocturnal emission
9. Amount of water in ablution
10. Unnecessarily spending water in ablution
11. Various forms for Qur'an recitation by a junub
12. Definition of used water
13. Difference between received and poured water
14. Survey on spherical (round) water
15. Expanding the field of waters whose surface and depth are not equal
16. How much depth is needed in an excessive amount of water
17. Orders related to pure water
18. Regarding the water bought by a child, a gift by Prophet
19. Explanation of water flow
20. The best description and definition of tayammum
21. Conditions of shortage of water
22. Statement of Imam Zafar regarding the tayammum
23. Definition of earthen for tayammum
24. Conditions for not reusing earthen for tayammum
25. Explanation of the quote of Sadr al-Shari'a about tayammum
26. Guide for problems faced by junub
27. Ruling about dog and its hunt
28. The ruling of sugar being cleaned from animal bones
29. Explanation of the difference between the ruling of bones and wine

=== Book of Prayer ===
This part focuses on the prayer under Hanafi fiqh and contains around 1203 fatawa in around 23 journals:

1. Book of prayer
2. Pearls of the crown, in the statement of prayer before the night journey
3. Is it allowed to offer two prayers jointly
4. Improvement of eyesight due to the kissing of thumbs
5. Ruling of thumbs during iqama
6. Ruling on the justification for calling adhan on the grave after burial
7. Determining the correct direction of Qiblah
8. Explanation of place of articulation of Ḍād
9. Correct Pronunciation of Ḍād
10. It is extremely prohibited to pray behind the rejectors of taqlid
11. Four Answers
12. For those who accept the second congregational prayer
13. Imam's correct qiyam in Mihrab
14. Refutation of a fatawa about Qanoot e Nazila
15. Blessings of Salat il Asrar, research of Salat ul Ghosia
16. Method of Salat ul Ghosia
17. Reciting the blessed Bismillah in Tarawih
18. The courtyard of the mosque is part of the mosque
19. Researching if its allowed for the imam to leave minbar to greet the ruler
20. Ruling for dua between khutbah of Friday prayer
21. Ruling for second Adhan for Friday prayer
22. Ruling for dua after eid prayers
23. Proofs of embracing muslim brothers after eid prayers

=== Book of Funeral Prayer ===
This part focuses on the Islamic funeral prayer under Hanafi fiqh and contains around 273 fatawa in around 13 journals:

1. Discussion about permissibility of writing prayers on the shroud of the dead
