= Hassan Raza Khan =

20th-century Indian poet

His Eminence Maulana Hasan Raza Khan
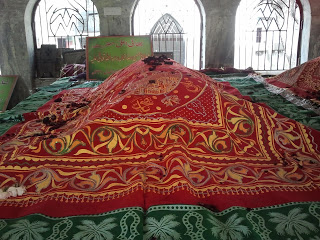
- Title: Ustad-e-Zaman

Personal life
- Born: Muhammad; 1 October 1859 Bareilly, North-Western Provinces, British India
- Died: 18 October 1908 (aged 49) Bareilly, United Provinces, British India
- Resting place: Dargah E Aala Hazrat, Bareilly Sharif, Uttar Pradesh, India
- Children: Hussain Raza Khan; Hasnain Raza Khan
- Parent: Naqi Ali Khan (father)
- Citizenship: British Indian
- Pen name: Hasan

Religious life
- Religion: Islam
- Denomination: Sunni
- Jurisprudence: Hanafi
- Tariqa: Qadri, Chishti, Soharwardi, Naqshbandi
- Profession: Poet

Muslim leader
- Period in office: 1921 - 1943
- Predecessor: Naqi Ali Khan

Hassan Raza Khan Barelvi (1 October 1859–18 October 1908) popularly known as Hasan Barelvi was an Indian Islamic scholar, sufi and poet and the younger brother of Imam Ahmed Raza Khan Barelvi, the main leader of the Ahle Sunnat movement. He was a disciple of Syed Shah Ale Rasool Marehrawi, a Sufi master from Marehra, Etah, Uttar Pradesh. He was a disciple of Dagh Dehlvi, a learned poet from Delhi. Hasrat Mohani praised Khan's poetry.

== Birth and family ==
Hassan Raza was born in 1859 (Rabi' al-awwal 1276 Hijri), in Bareilly, India. His original name was Muhammad, as it was family tradition.

== Lineage ==
Naqi Ali Khan
Ahmed Raza Khan	Hassan Raza Khan
Hamid Raza Khan	Mustafa Raza Khan	Hussain Raza Khan	Hasnain Raza Khan
Ibrahim Raza Khan
Akhtar Raza Khan
Asjad Raza Khan

Khan was the brother of Ahmad Raza Khan, the son of Naqi Ali Khan, the son of Raza Ali Khan.

== Poetry works ==
He wrote the following books. He wrote the book of poetry Zauq-e-Naat.

- Ayina e Qayamat
- Rasayel e Hassan
- Qitat e Ashar o Ahsan
- Samar e Fasahat
- Qand Parsi
- Samamam Hasan Baradbar fitan
- Wasaail Bakhshish
- Zauq e Naat- Naatia Kalam
- Kuliyat e Hassan

== Death ==
Khan died on 22nd Ramadan 1326 Hijri (1908 CE). He is buried in City Graveyard Bareilly Shareef beside his mother Mazaar Shareef.

== Family ==
His great grandson, Kaif Raza Khan, is the Sajjada Nashin chairman of the governing body of Dargah Ustad E Zaman, the shrine of Hassan Raza Khan

== See also ==
- Ahmed Raza Khan
- Mustafa Raza Khan
- Hamid Raza Khan
- Naqi Ali Khan
- Maulana Kaif Raza Khan
