= Akhtar Raza Khan =

Indian Islamic scholar (1943–2018)

Personal life
- Born: Muhammad Ismail Raza; 23 November 1943 Bareilly, United Provinces, British India (present day Uttar Pradesh, India)
- Died: 20 July 2018 (aged 74) (7 Zul-Qaida 1439) Bareilly, Uttar Pradesh, India
- Resting place: Bareilly Dargah
- Children: 6, including Asjad Raza Khan
- Parent: Ibrahim Raza Khan (father)
- Era: Contemporary
- Notable work: Book list
- Education: Manzar-i Islam (Bareilly), Islamia Inter College, Bareilly, Al-Azhar University 1963 -1966
- Known for: Fatawa Taajush Shariah
- Other name: Tajush Sharia
- Relatives: Ahmed Raza Khan Barelvi (great-grandfather)
- Website: muftiakhtarrazakhan.com

Religious life
- Religion: Islam
- Founder of: Jamiatur Raza
- Sect: Sunni
- Jurisprudence: Hanafi
- Movement: Barelvi

Muslim leader
- Influenced by: Ahmad Raza Khan
- Awards: "Fakhre Azhar" (Pride of Azhar)

Muhammad Akhtar Raza Khan Azhari (Note: Urdu: اختر رضا خان, romanized: Akhtar Raẓā Khān) (born Muhammad Ismail Raza; 23 November 1943 – 20 July 2018), also known as Tajush Shari'a , (Note: Urdu: تاج الشریعہ, romanized: Tājush Sharīʿah) and Azhari Miyan, was an Indian Islamic scholar. He was the great-grandson of Ahmed Raza Khan Barelvi who was the founder of the Barelvi movement. He was considered the leading authority of the Barelvi school of thought in India, succeeding Mustafa Raza Khan. After his death in 2018, Khan was succeeded by his son Asjad Raza Khan.

Akhtar was ranked 24th on the list of The 500 Most Influential Muslims in the world in 2018 edition, 26th in 2010, 28th in 2011, 26th in 2012, 22nd in 2013-2014, 22nd in 2014-15, 25th in 2016 editions, compiled by the Royal Islamic Strategic Studies Centre. He had tens of millions of followers in India.

== Early life and education ==
He was born on 23 November 1943 at Muhallah Saudagaran in Bareilly, British India, to Ibrahim Raza Khan as the grandson of Hamid Raza Khan and as a great-grandson of Ahmad Raza Khan, who was considered to be a mujaddid by his followers and founder of the Barelvi movement.

He went to attended and graduated from the Manzar-i Islam of the Bareilly Dargah, and then Islamia Inter College, Bareilly. He post-graduated from the Al-Azhar University in Egypt in the Arabic literature and Islamic Studies with specialisation in Hadith and Tafseer from 1963 to 1966, where he was conferred with the Fakhr-e-Azhar (Pride of Azhar) award by Gamal Abdel Nasser.

== Religious career ==
In 1967, at the age of 25, he became a teacher at the Manzar-i Islam at Bareilly Dargah.

=== Spiritual life ===
Khan was a spiritual follower and successor of his maternal grandfather Mustafa Raza Khan Qadri in the Qadriyya-Barkatiyya-Razviyya-Nooriya order of Sufism.

=== After retirement ===
He formally retired from teaching in 1980, but continued to issue fatwa, and holding seminars for students at Dar al-Ifta.

In 2000, he founded the Centre of Islamic Studies Jamiatur Raza based in Bareilly, Uttar Pradesh, India.

Khan was known by several titles among Barelvis in India, such as Tajush Sharia ("Crown of Sharia"), Mufti-e-Azam ("Supreme Mufti"), Qazi ul-Quzzat ("Islamic Chief Justice"), and others. He had been ranked 22nd on the list of The 500 Most Influential Muslims in the world (2014–15 edition), compiled by the Royal Islamic Strategic Studies Centre. He had tens of millions of followers in India.

He died following a long illness on 20 July 2018, aged 74. After his death Mufti Mohammad Salim Noori, spokesperson of the Bareilly Dargah, said Khan was "the lone cleric in India to get a title of Tajushariya and "one of the few prominent persons across the world to be allowed to visit the inside [of the] Kaaba in Mecca."

== Funeral ==
Hundreds of thousands of people attended his funeral. His funeral occurred on 22 July 2018 at Islamia Inter College, Bareilly. The prayer was led by his son and successor Asjad Raza Khan. His funeral was watched by at least 12,500,000 people across the world. A day of mourning was organised in Bareilly.

The funeral was organised by the Members of Bareilly Dargah and other organisations related to Dargah. The Namaz-e-Janaza was led by the son of Akhtar Raza Khan and head Mufti of Bareilly, Asjad Raza Khan at 10:00 AM on 22 July 2018.

=== Memorial events ===
Since 2019, the Urs of Akhtar Raza Khan is organised annually at the Bareilly Dargah to commemorate the death.

== Publications ==
=== Views ===
His Urdu-language fatwa collection was known as Majmu'ah Fatawa. His English collection is named Azharul Fatawa. One of his fatwas was his edict on the interest given to a Muslim by a non-Muslim:

When there is a dealing between a Muslim and a Muslim or a Muslim and a Zimmi Kaffir (a non-Muslim living in the safety of an Islamic state), the taking more money than loaned is considered as interest and such a dealing will be unlawful. However, if this condition does not exist, this excess money will not be considered as interest and will be legitimate for a Muslim as it is unanimous that there is no interest applicable when there is dealing between a Muslim and a Harbi Kaafir (a non-Muslim who is not living in the safety of an Islamic State).

He had issued fatwa against the sterilisation in 1975 on the order of Mustafa Raza Khan Qadri when Indira Gandhi had made the sterilisation compulsory.

In 2016, Khan wrote a book Tie Ka Mas'ala and he had issued fatwa against wearing ties, Khan had called tie as the symbol of Christians, the non-Muslims.

In October 2016, Khan under the letterhead of Shariat Council of India issued the Fatwa against the Uniform Civil Code in India and said it is made a law, it will be boycotted.

Akhtar Raza Khan was known for some of his extreme views; he penned a pamphlet forbidding prayers behind Deobandi imams. He was also sceptical of the Pakistani Barelvi organisation Dawat-e-Islami and their leader Ilyas Qadri. He wrote a book named "Iblis Ka Raqs" in refutation of Qadri and his organisation.

=== Poetry ===
His composition of Na`at was entitled Safina-e-Bakhshish, written in three languages.

=== Books ===
He was the author of "more than 50 books on Islamic theology and thought in Urdu and Arabic", including:

- Hijrat-e-Rasool
- Al-Mawahib al-Rizwiyyah Fi al-Fatawa al-Azhariyyah
- Aasaar-e-Qiyamat
- Al-Haq-ul-Mubeen (Arabic and Urdu)
- Safeenah-e-Bakhshish (Na'at collection)
- Fatawa Taj-us-Shari'ah
- Suno Chup Raho

== Bibliography ==
- Raza, Mufti Dr Yunus. Sawaneh Tajushshariah (Roman Urdu). Abde Mustafa Official.
- Noori, Muhammad Afthab Cassim al-Qaadiri Razvi (21 October 2022). THE MIRACLE OF RAZA TAAJUSH SHARIAH. Noori Publications.
- Misbahi, Muhammad Kashif Raza Shaad. Huzoor Tajushshariah Ke Kalaam Mein Muhawraat Ka Istemal (Roman Urdu). Abde Mustafa Official.
- Markazi, Maulana Muhammad Raza. Huzoor Tajushshariah Aur Bukhari Shareef Ki Pehli Hadees Ka Dars (Roman Urdu). Abde Mustafa Official.
- Razvi, Mohammad Shahabuddin (2008). Hayat-e-Tajush Shariah [Life of Tajush Shari'ah] (in Urdu). Translated by Razvi, Mohammad Shahabuddin. Bareilly: Islamic Research Centre.
- Razvi, Mohammad Shahabuddin (2015). Karamat-e-Tajush Shariah [Miracles of Tajush Shari'ah] (in Urdu). Translated by Razvi, Mohammad Shahabuddin. Bareily: Islamic Research Centre.
- Qadri, Farid-uz-Zaman. Raahe Bakhshish [Way of Salvation] (in Urdu). Mumbai: Sunni Islamic Publisher.
