= Manzar-e-Islam =

Seminary in Uttar Pradesh, India

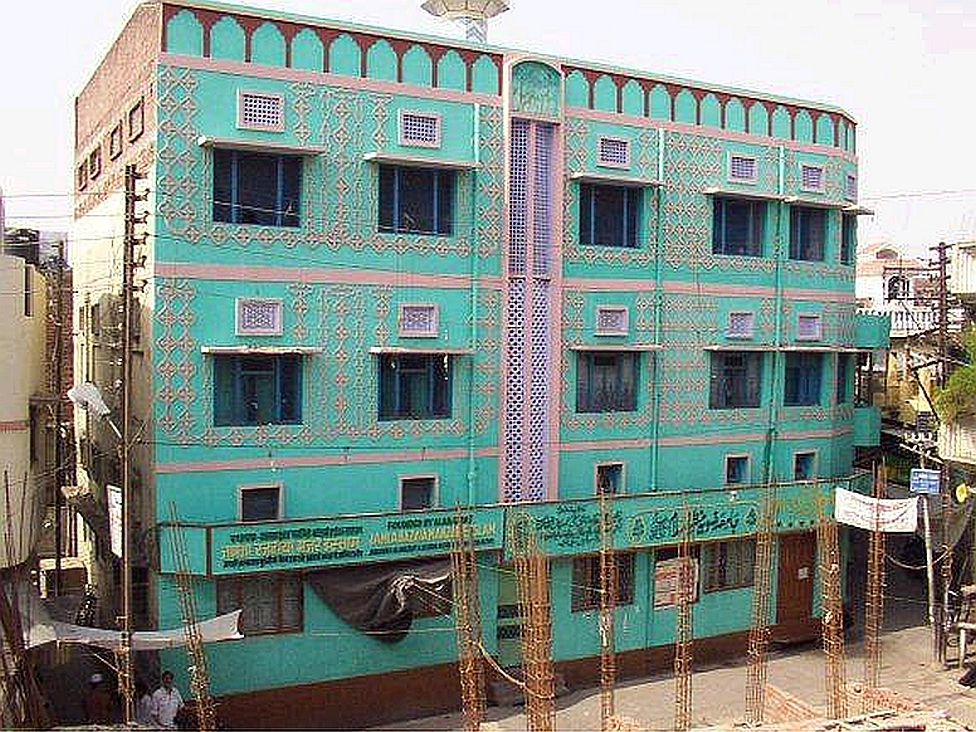
- Type: Islamic university
- Established: 1904 (122 years ago)
- Founders: Ahmad Raza Khan; Hassan Raza Khan; Amjad Ali Aazmi
- Affiliations: Uttar Pradesh Madrasa Board
- Religious affiliation: Barelvi movement
- Rector: Subhan Raza Khan
- Students: 1000+
- Location: Bareilly, Uttar Pradesh, India
- Campus: Urban
- Website: www.ala-hazrat.com/intromanzareislam.html

Manzar-e-Islam is an Islamic seminary in Bareilly, Uttar Pradesh, India. It was founded in 1904 by a number of scholars, including Ahmad Raza Khan, Hasan Raza Khan, Amjad Ali Aazmi, Lutfullah Aligarhi, Zafar al-Din Bihari and others.

It celebrated its hundredth anniversary in 2004 this occasion was marked by a series of publications in monthly magazine Ala Hazrat whose editor in chief is Subhan Raza Khan. He also prepared a plan to upgrade the madrasa in view of the shortage of space.

== History ==
Islamic scholar Zafar al-Din Bihari played a central role in the creation of Manzar-e-Islam. He proposed to Ahmad Raza Khan to build a seminary in Bareilly, considering that the only seminary in Bareilly was dominated by Deobandis at the time. Although Ahmad Raza Khan was initially reluctant, he later agreed to build a seminary. Hasan Raza Khan was the first administrator of Manzar-e-Islam. Among the first teachers of Manzar-e-Islam were Haji Hakeem Amirullah Barelvi, Irshad Hussain Faruqi Rampuri and Lutfullah Aligarhi. Ahmad Raza Khan was not a formal teacher there; however he did teach a lecture of Sahih al-Bukhari to Zafar al-Din Bihari and Amjad Ali Aazmi after the Asr prayers.

However, Manzar-e-Islam was long less formalized than its rival seminary, the Darul Uloom Deoband of the Deobandi faction.

== Controversies ==
On the International Yoga Day 2023, which created a controversy in Barelvi family and also between religious scholars.

On 15 August 2017, then Shehar Qazi Asjad Raza Khan, son of Akhtar Raza Khan, then Grand Mufti of India, denounced the order for videography of the program from the Government of Uttar Pradesh headed by Yogi Adityanath stating that videography and photography is anti-Islamic. The madrasa students did not sing the National Anthem and instead sung Sare Jahan Se Achcha. Bareilly divisional commissioner PV Jaganmohan said:

Singing national anthem is the fundamental duty of every citizen. If any madarsa had violated the government order of singing national anthem during Independence Day celebrations, they will face action. But madarsas will be asked to explain why they violated the order.

== Famous Fatawa ==
In September 2007 Darul Ifta of Manzar-e-Islam issued a Fatwa, which declaring the Indian film actor Salman Khan and his family as non-Muslims after they were shown on TV placing Ganesh (a Hindu elephant deity) in their house and worshipping it. The clerics of the Darul Ifta stated in their fatwa that Islam prohibits idol worship and the actor would have to recite the Shahadah in order to become Muslims again. However, a Mufti of Manzar-e-Islam clarified that "they were asked their opinion about Muslims who worship idols and participates in idol worshipping processions, nowhere Salman Khan or his recent act was mentioned. The rule of Islam regarding idol worshipping is quite clear and this act is considered non-Islamic therefore any Muslim involved in worshipping anyone besides Allah need to recite Kalma again" and that the question was general and not specific to any person.

In February 2015 the madrasa issued a fatwa against Azam Khan a Minister of Uttar Pradesh on his proposal to build a temple for his party president Mulayam Singh Yadav. The madrasa said "In Islam believing in anyone other than Allah is illegitimate and so talking about building a temple is equally wrong,"

== See also ==
- Jamiatur Raza
- Al Jamiatul Ashrafia
- Al-Jame-atul-Islamia
