= Hamid Raza Khan =

20th-century Indian Islamic scholar

Hamid Raza Khan Qadri
- Title: Hujjat al-Islam, Shahzada E Aala Hazrat

Personal life
- Born: Muhammad; 1875 Bareilly, North-Western Provinces, British India
- Died: May 23, 1943 (aged 67–68) Bareilly, United Provinces, British India
- Resting place: Dargah E Aala Hazrat, Bareilly Sharif, Uttar Pradesh, India
- Children: Muhammad Ibrahim Raza Khan Qadri Razvi, Hammad Raza Khan
- Parent: Ahmed Raza Khan (father)
- Citizenship: British Indian
- Known for: Fatawa Hamidiyah
- Pen name: Hamid

Religious life
- Religion: Islam
- Denomination: Sunni
- Jurisprudence: Hanafi
- Tariqa: Qadri, Barkati, Razvi
- Creed: Maturidi
- Profession: Islamic scholar

Muslim leader
- Period in office: Modern era
- Predecessor: Ahmed Raza Khan
- Successor: Mustafa Raza Khan Qadri

President of the Jama'at Raza-e-Mustafa
- In office 1921–1943
- Preceded by: Ahmed Raza Khan
- Succeeded by: Mustafa Raza Khan Qadri

Hamid Raza Khan Qadri was an Islamic scholar and mystic of the Barelvi movement. Qadri was born in 1875 (Rabi' al-awwal 1292 Hijri), in Bareilly, India. His name at the time of his aqeeqah was Muhammad, as it was family tradition.

== Lineage ==
Mawlana Hamid Raza Khan was the son of Imam Ahmad Raza Khan, the son of Mawlana Naqi Ali Khan, the son of Mawlana Raza Ali Khan.

		Naqi Ali Khan; 1830-1880
	Ahmad Raza Khan; 1856 -1921	Hassan Raza Khan; 1859 -1908	Muhammad Raza Khan	3 Daughters
Hamid Raza Khan; 1875 -1943	Mustafa Raza Khan; 1892–1981	5 Daughters

== Education ==
He received his early education from his father. He completed his formal Islamic studies at 19. He was proficient in Arabic and Persian, as well as ahadith, fiqh, philosophy and mathematics.

== Literary works ==
He translated Ad Daulatul Makkiya Bil Mad'datil Ghaibiya from Arabic to Urdu. It explains knowledge of the unseen in the life of Muhammad.

Khan's works include:

- As Saarimur Rabaani alaa Asraaf Qaadiyani(Refuting Ahmadiyyah Sect)
- Translation of Ad Daulatul Makkiyah
- Translation of Kiflul Faqeeh Alfahim Fi Hukme Qirats addarahim
- Haashia Mulla Jalaal
- Naatia Deewaan
- Fatawa Hamidiyah

== Death ==
Mawlana Hamid Raza Khan died while praying on 17 Jumada al-awwal (23 May 1943). His funeral prayer was led by Muhaddith-e-Azam Pakistan, Mawlana Sardaar Ahmed. His tomb is beside his father.

== See also ==
- Ahmad Raza Khan
- Mustafa Raza Khan
