= Bareilly Dargah =

Sufi shrine in Bareilly, Uttar Pradesh, India

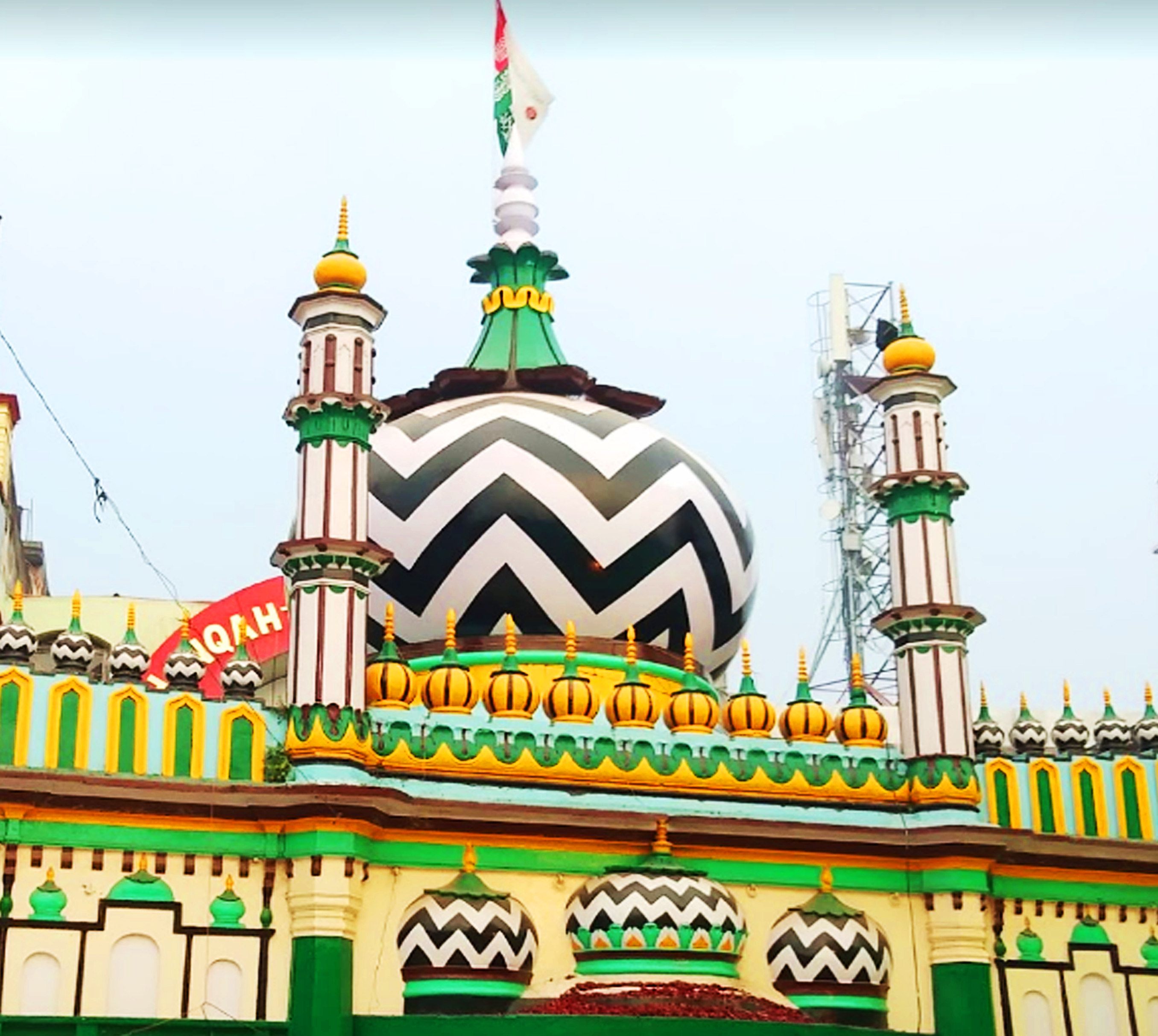

- Location within Uttar Pradesh Location within India

Religion
- Affiliation: Islam
- District: Bareilly district
- Province: Uttar Pradesh
- Ownership: Individual
- Leadership: Ahsan Raza Khan (Sajjada nashin)

Location
- Location: Bareilly
- Country: India
- Coordinates: 28°21′43″N 79°24′31″E

Architecture
- Architect: Shah Mahmood Jaan Qadri
- Type: Dargah
- Style: Modern
- Established: 1921
- Completed: 1921

Specifications
- Direction of façade: West
- Dome: 1
- Minaret: 4
- Shrine: 13

Bareilly Dargah or Dargah-E-Ala Hazrat is a Sufi shrine and complex in Bareilly district, Uttar Pradesh, India. It contains the mausoleum of Imam Ahmad Raza Khan, Mustafa Raza Khan, Rehan Raza Khan and other members of the Raza Khan family.

The Dome of the Dargah was designed by Shah Mehmood Jaan Qadri with the use of matchsticks.

== Fatwas ==
The Bareilly Dargah is known for issuing several renowned fatwas. Clerics there have issued verdicts against Muhammad Ali Jinnah, the founder of Pakistan along with other issues.

== Urs ==
In 2014 during the observation of the death anniversary of Ahmed Raza Khan (Urs-e-Razvi) at the Dargah-e-Ala Hazrat, Muslim clerics condemned the terrorism practiced by the Taliban and the ideology of the Wahhabi sect. Although the Dargah was once the main site for the Urs-e-Razavi, the official Urs is also now observed in a dozen countries. This is due to the large crowds and the arrival of many scholars.
