= Mustafa Raza Khan Qadri =

Indian Islamic scholar (1892–1981)

Mustafa Raza Khan Qadri Noori
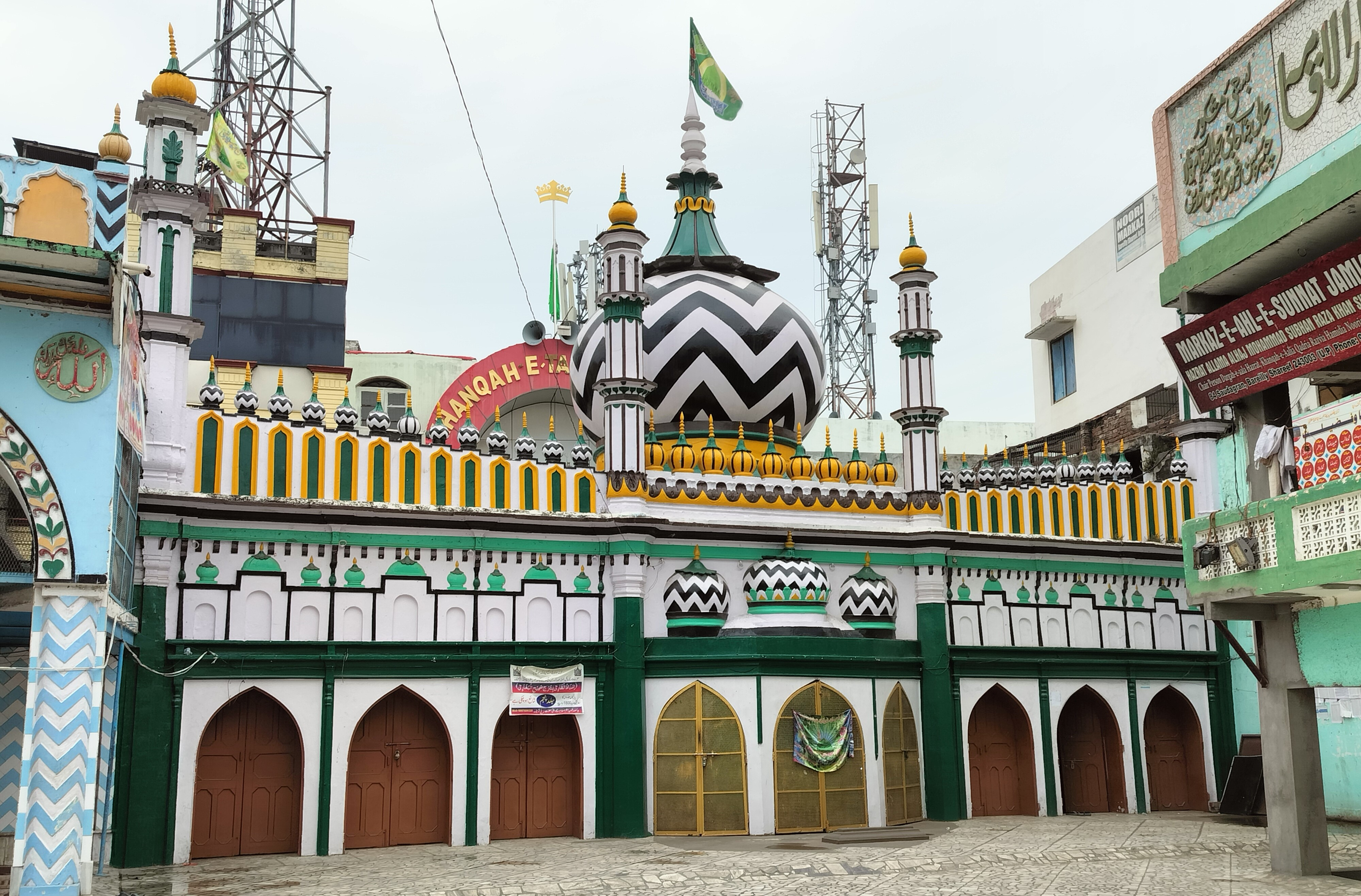
- Born: 18 July 1892 (22nd Dhu al-Hijjah 1310 AH); Bareilly, North-Western Provinces, British India
- Died: 11 November 1981 (aged 90) (14 Muharram 1402 AH); Bareilly, Uttar Pradesh, India
- Era: Contemporary
- Organization: Jama'at Raza-e-Mustafa
- Known for: Fatawa-e-Mustafawia
- Notable work: Fatawa-e-Mustafawia, 1977 (against vasectomy)
- Predecessor: Ahmad Raza Khan
- Successor: Akhtar Raza Khan
- Children: 7
- Father: Ahmad Raza Khan
- Relatives: Hamid Raza Khan Elder brother
- Family: Raza Khan family

Personal life
- Home town: Bareilly
- Children: 7
- Parent: Ahmed Raza Khan Barelvi (father)
- Notable work: See the list
- Education: Manzar E Islam
- Known for: Taqwa & Fatwa

Religious life
- Religion: Islam
- Denomination: Sunni
- Founder of: Darul Uloom Mazhar E Islam
- Jurisprudence: Hanafi
- Creed: Maturidi
- Movement: Barelvi

Muslim leader
- Teacher: Ahmad Raza Khan
- Students: Sardar Ahmad Chishti, Muhammad Alawi al-Maliki, Qamaruzzaman Azmi
- Influenced by: Ahmed Raza Khan

Mustafa Raza Khan Qadri (18 July 1892 – 11 November 1981) was an Indian Islamic scholar affiliated with the Barelvi movement. He was the son of Ahmad Raza Khan. On his death date his followers celebrate his urs on every 14th Muharram of the Islamic calendar.

== Lineage ==
		Naqi Ali Khan; 1830-1880
	Ahmad Raza Khan; 1856 -1921	Hassan Raza Khan; 1859 -1908	Muhammad Raza Khan	3 Daughters
Hamid Raza Khan; 1875 -1943	Mustafa Raza Khan; 1892–1981	5 Daughters

== Life ==
He wrote books on Islam in Arabic, Urdu, Persian, and announced judgments on several thousand Islamic problems in his compilation of fatawa Fatawa-e-Mustafwia. Thousands of Islamic scholars were counted as his spiritual successors. He was the main leader of the Jama'at Raza-e-Mustafa in Bareilly, which opposed the Shuddhi movement to convert Muslims to Hinduism in pre-Partition India. It would also act as a quasi-political organisation in opposition to the Deobandi-dominated Jamiat Ulama-e-Hind. Khan participated in one of the All India Sunni Conference meeting.

Khan was known by his followers as Tajdar-e-Ahle Sunnat, Mufti-e-Azam and Mustafavi Miyan. During the time of emergency in 1977 in India, he issued a fatwa against vasectomy which was made compulsory and 6.2 million Indian men were sterilized in just a year. In such circumstances Mustafa Raza Khan argued this order of Indian government given by Indira Gandhi.

== Works ==
Raza Khan's books include:

- Fatawa-e-Mustafawia 7 volumes (Religious rulings Mustafa Raza)
- Al Malfoozat of Ala Hazrat (Sayings of Ahmed Raza Khan)
- Saman-e-Bakhshish (Compilation of Islamic Poetry in the Honor of Prophet Muhammad)
- Taqiya Baazi (Hidden Faces of Wahhabism)
- Waqat-us-Sinan، Adkhal-us-Sinan، Qahr Wajid Diyan
- Turq-ul-Huda Wal Irshad Ilaa Ahkam Al Amara Wal Jehad
- Tasheeh Yaqeen Bar Khatm-e-Naiyeeen
- Tardush Shaitan An Sabee Lur Rehman (Fatwa Refuting Government of Saudi Arabia For Imposing Tax on Pilgrims in 1365 A.H)
- No Caste is Inferior

== Disciples ==
His disciples include:

- Muhammad Alawi al-Maliki
- Sayed Muhammad Ameen
- Muhammad Mujeeb Ashraf
- Mahmood Ahmad Razvi Quadri Ashrafi
- Muhammad Idrees Raza Khan Qadri Razvi Hashmati
- Akhtar Raza Khan
- Muhammad Afzal Husain
- Muhammad Husain
- Rayhan Raza Khan
- Tehseen Raza Khan
- Sayed Noor Muhammad
- Zia Ul Mustafa
- Shaykh Abdul Hadi Qaadri
- Ahmad Muqaddam Qaadri
- Badrul Qaadri
- Ghulam Sarwar Al Qaadri
- Mahmood Ahmad Qadri Rafaqati
- Arshadul Qadri
- Muhammad Ibrahim Raza
- Muhammed Abdul Hamid Palmer Razvi
- Muhammad Ghufraan Siddiqi
- Muhammad Muslehuddin Siddiqui
- Sayed Shah Shah Turab-ul-Haq
- Dr. Mufti Ghulam Sarwar Qadri
- Badruddin Ahmed Qadri
- Mufti Abdul Rashid Mufti e Azam Baraar
- Mufti Mujeeb Ali
- Allahma Akbar ali Rezvi
- Mufti Anwarul Hak Qadri

== Bibliography ==
- Razvi, Moulana Muhammad Afthab Cassim, ed. (10 May 2011). Mufti-e-Azam-e-Hind — Imam Mustapha Raza Khan (PDF). books.nafseislam.com. Archived (PDF) from the original on 12 June 2020.
- Sanyal, Usha (July 1998). "Generational Changes in the Leadership of the Ahl-e Sunnat Movement in North India during the Twentieth Century". Modern Asian Studies. 32 (3). Cambridge University Press: 635–656. doi:10.1017/S0026749X98003059. JSTOR 313161.
