= Ahmed Raza Khan Barelvi =

Indian Islamic scholar (1856–1921)

A'la Hazrat Ahmad Raza Khan

Personal life
- Born: 14 June 1856 Bareilly, North-Western Provinces, British India (present-day Uttar Pradesh, India)
- Died: 28 October 1921 (aged 65) Bareilly, United Provinces, British India (present-day Uttar Pradesh, India)
- Resting place: Bareilly Dargah, Uttar Pradesh, India
- Spouse: Irshad Begum
- Children: Hamid Raza Khan; Mustafa Raza Khan; Mustafai Begum; Kaneez Hasan; Kaneez Husain; Kaneez Hasnain; Murtazai Begum
- Parents: Naqi Ali Khan (father); Hussaini Khanum (mother)
- Era: Modern era
- Region: South Asia
- Main interest(s): Islamic theology, Hadith, Tafsir, Hanafi jurisprudence, Urdu poetry, Tasawwuf, Science, Philosophy, Psychology, Astronomy
- Relations: Hassan Raza Khan (brother); Ibrahim Raza Khan (grandson) (son of Hamid Raza Khan); Akhtar Raza Khan (great-grandson); Asjad Raza Khan (great-great-grandson); Subhan Raza Khan (great-great-grandson); Kaif Raza Khan (great-great-grandson); Tawqir Raza Khan (great-great-grandson)

Religious life
- Religion: Islam
- Denomination: Sunni
- Jurisprudence: Hanafi
- Tariqa: Qadiri
- Creed: Maturidi
- Movement: Barelvi

Muslim leader
- Successor: Hamid Raza Khan
- Influenced by: Abdul Qadir Gilani Mu'in al-Din Chishti Nizamuddin Auliya Al-Suyuti Ibn Abidin Qadi Iyad Fazle Rasul Badayuni
- Influenced: The entirety of Barelvi Movement

Ahmad Raza Khan Barelvi (Note: Urdu: احمد رضا خان بریلوی قادری, romanized: Aḥmed Raẓā Khān Barelvī) (14 June 1856 – 28 October 1921) was an Indian Islamic scholar who is considered as one of the founders of the Barelvi movement. His students include Amjad Ali Aazmi, Abdul Aleem Siddiqi, Ziauddin Madani and several others.

Born in Bareilly, British India into the Qadiri order, Khan studied under his father Naqi Ali Khan. He was authorized in Sufism by Shah Al-i Rasul and founded the Manzar-i Islam in Bareilly in 1904. He was a staunch critic of the Ahmadiyya, Deobandi and Wahhabi movements, denouncing their beliefs in his book Husam ul-Haramayn (1906). His poetic work, Hada'iq-i Bakhshish (1907), and translation of the Quran into Urdu, Kanz ul-Iman (1911), are among his well-known works. Khan's magnum opus Fatawa-i Razawiyya is a compendium of fatawa (legal edicts) of the Hanafi school of Sunni Islam.

In 1920, Khan initiated the Jama'at Raza-i Mustafa aiming to propagate Islam via dawah. After his death, his eldest son Hamid succeeded him as organization's president. while his other son Mustafa published his father's questions and answers during his lifetime as Malfuzat-i A'la Hazrat. Khan is often viewed as the mujadid (reformer) of his time by Barelvis. His shrine lies at the Bareilly Dargah and frequently visited by Barelvis during his annual urs (death anniversary) in the Islamic month of Safar. He influenced millions of people, and today the Barelvi movement has more than 200 million followers.

== Biography ==
=== Family background ===
Khan was born on 10 Shawwal 1272 Hijri corresponds to 14 June 1856 to an Indian Muslim family in the Mohallah of Jasoli in Bareilly district, North-Western Provinces, British India.

The family belonged to the Barech tribe of Pashtuns, his ancestor Muhammad Saeedullah Khan, a warrior who accompanied Nader Shah, having migrated from Kandahar (current-day Afghanistan) to Lahore (current-day Pakistan) while the family later settled down in Bareilly.

His father, Naqi Ali Khan, was an Islamic scholar.

The name corresponding to the year of his birth was al-Mukhtar. His birth name was Muhammad. Khan used the appellation "Abd-ul-Mustafa" ("servant of the chosen one") prior to signing his name in correspondence.

=== Teachers ===
According to Hayat-e-Aala Hazrat written by Malik Zafaruddin Bihari, some of his famous teachers included:

- Syed Shah Aale Rasul Marehrawi (d. 1879)
- Naqi Ali Khan (d. 1880)
- Ahmad Zayni Dahlan Makki (d. 1881)
- Abdul Rahman Siraj Makki (d. 1883)
- Hussain bin Saleh (d. 1884)
- Abul Hussain Ahmad Al-Nuri (d. 1906)
- Abdul Ali Rampuri (d. 1885)

=== Spiritual order ===
In the year 1294 A.H. (1877), at the age of 22 years, Ahmed Raza became the Mureed (disciple) of Shah Aale Rasool Marehrawi. His Murshid bestowed him with Khilafat in several Sufi Silsilas. Some Islamic scholars received permission from him to work under his guidance.

=== Barelvi movement ===
Imam Ahmed Raza wrote extensively in defense of his views, countered Wahhabism and the Deobandi movement, and by his writing and activity became the founder of the Barelvi movement. The movement has spread across the globe with followers in Pakistan, India, South Africa and Bangladesh. The movement now has over 200 million followers globally. The movement was largely a rural phenomenon when began but is currently popular among urban, educated Pakistanis and Indians as well as the South Asian diaspora throughout the world.

The efforts of Khan and his associate scholars to establish a movement to counter the Deobandi and Ahl-i Hadith movements resulted to in the institutionalisation of diverse Sufi movements and their allies in various parts of the world.

=== Jamat Raza-e-Mustafa ===
Khan founded an organisation Jamat Raza-e-Mustafa, on 17 December 1920 with the aim of progress, unity and religious education of the Ahl-e-Sunnat wal Jamat.

=== Death ===
Ahmed Raza Khan died on 28 October 1921 (25 Safar 1340 AH) at the age of 65. He is buried in Bareilly Sharif Dargah. Urs-e-Razavi is a 3 day long annual event commemorating his death anniversary.

== Books ==
Imam Ahmed Raza Khan wrote several hundred books in Arabic, Persian, and Urdu, including the thirty-volume fatwa compilation Fatawa Razawiyya, and Kanz ul-Iman (Translation and Explanation of the Qur'an). Several of his books have been translated into European and South Asian languages.

=== Kanz ul-Iman (Translation of the Qur'an) ===
Kanz ul-Iman (Urdu and Arabic: کنزالایمان) is a 1910 Urdu paraphrase translation of the Qur'an by Khan. It is associated with the Hanafi jurisprudence within Sunni Islam, and is a widely read version of the translation in the Indian Subcontinent. It has been translated into English, Hindi, Bengali, Dutch, Turkish, Sindhi, Gujarati, and Pashto, and also recently translated into Gojri language by Mufti Nazir Ahmed Qadri.

=== Hussam ul-Haramain ===
Husam ul-Haramain or Husam al-Harmain Ala Munhir Kufr wal-Mayn (The Sword of the Haramayn at the Throat of Disbelief and Falsehood) 1906, is a treatise which declared infidels the founders of the Deobandi, Ahl-i Hadith and Ahmadiyya movements on the basis that they did not have the proper veneration of Muhammad and finality of prophethood in their writings. In defense of his verdict he obtained confirmatory signatures from 268 scholars in South Asia, and some from scholars in Mecca and Medina. The treatise is published in Arabic, Urdu, English, Turkish and Hindi.

=== Fatawa Razawiyya ===
Fatawa Razawiyya or the full name al-Ataya fi-Nabaviah Fatawa-i Razawiyya (Verdicts of Imam Ahmed Raza by the Blessings of the Prophet) is the main fatwa (Islamic verdicts on various issues) book of his movement. It has been published in 30 volumes and in approx. 22,000 pages. It contains solutions to daily problems from religion to business and from war to marriage.

He reached judgments with regard to certain practices and faith in his book Fatawa-i Razawiyya, including:

- Islamic Law is the ultimate law and following it is obligatory for all Muslims;
- To refrain from misguidance is essential;
- It is impermissible to imitate the Kuffar, to associate with the deviants, and to participate in their festivals.

=== Hadaiq-e-Bakhshish ===
He wrote na'at (devotional poetry in praise of Muhammad) and always discussed him in the present tense. His main book of poetry is Hadaiq-e-Bakhshish.

His poems, which deal for the most part with the qualities of Muhammad, often have a simplicity and directness.

His Urdu couplets, entitled Mustafa Jaane Rahmat pe Lakhon Salaam (Hundreds of Thousands of Salutations upon Mustafa, the Paragon of Mercy), are recited in mosques globally. They contain praise of Muhammad, his physical appearance (verses 33 to 80), his life and times, praise of his family and companions, praise of the Awliya and Salihin (the saints and the pious).

=== Al Daulatul Makkiya Bil Madatul Ghaibiya ===
In 1323 Hijri (1905), Ahmad Raza went for his second Haj. Allamah Shaikh Saleh Kamal an Alim of Makkatul Mukarrama, he presented five questions to Ahmad Raza on behalf of the Ulema of Makkatul Mukarrama, this question was asked by Makkatul Mukarrama Wahhabi Ulema regarding Knowledge of the knowledge of Unseen (Ilm-e-Ghaib). At that time Ahmed Raza was suffering from a high fever, despite the illness he tried to answer all the questions, he answered in such detail that the answer took the form of a book, and this book was named Al Daulatul Makkiya Bil Madatul Ghaibiya.

== Religious views ==
Khan saw a decline of Sufism amongst Muslims in British India. His movement was a mass movement, defending popular Sufism, which grew in response to the influence of the Deobandi movement in South Asia and the Wahhabi movement elsewhere.

Imam Ahmed Raza Khan supported Tawassul, Mawlid, Prophet Muhammad's awareness of complete knowledge of the unseen, and other practices which were opposed by Wahhabis/Salafis and Deobandis.

=== Prophet Muhammad ===
In this contrast to the beliefs of the Deobandis and Wahhabis, Ahmed Raza Khan supported the following beliefs:

- Muhammad is a human being made of nur (light) and is all-seeing and all-hearing. This contrasts with the Deobandi view that Muhammad was al-Insān al-Kāmil (perfect person), but still a normal human.
- Muhammad is Haazir aur Naazir (all-seeing and all-hearing) which means that Muhammad views and witnesses the actions of his people.

This concept was interpreted by Shah Abdul Aziz in Tafsir Azizi in these words: The prophet is observing everybody, knows their good and bad deeds, and knows the strength of faith (Iman) of every individual Muslim and what has hindered his spiritual progress.

We do not hold that anyone can equal the knowledge of Allah Most High, or possess it independently, nor do we assert that Allah's giving of knowledge to the Prophet (Allah bless him and give him peace) is anything but a part. But what a patent and tremendous difference between one part [the Prophet's] and another [anyone else's]: like the difference between the sky and the earth, or rather even greater and more immense.

— Ahmed Raza Khan Barelvi, al-Dawla al-Makkiyya (c00), 291.

=== Infidels ===
Raza Khan was emphatic in opposing the Hindu influences on Muslim identity. To differentiate between a Muslim and an Infidel he emphatically said:

Presented with a choice of giving water to a thirsty infidel or to a dog, a believer should make the offering to dog.

— Ayesha Jalal, Ahmed Raza Khan Barelvi, Partisans of Allah: Jihad in South Asia p.147

=== Permissibility of currency notes ===
In 1905, Khan, on the request of contemporaries from Hijaz, wrote a verdict on the permissibility of using paper as a form of currency, entitled Kifl-ul-Faqeehil fehim Fe Ahkam-e-Kirtas Drahim.

=== Static earth theory ===
Khan authored a book, Fawz-i Mubin Dar Radd-i Harkat-i Zamin ("The Clear Victory in Rejection of Movement of the Earth", in which he provided than 100 arguments trying to prove the earth is not rotating but is stationary and rejected some of Newton's arguments.

== Sectarian views ==
=== Ahmadis ===
Mirza Ghulam Ahmad of Qadian claimed to be the Messiah, Prophet, and Mahdi awaited by some Muslims as well as a Nabi Ummati, a subordinate prophet to Muhammad who came to restore Islam to the pristine form as practiced by Muhammad and early Sahaba. Khan declared Mirza Ghulam Ahmad a heretic and apostate and called him and his followers disbelievers (kuffar).

=== Deobandis ===
The theological difference with the Deobandi school began when Ahmed Raza Khan Barelvi objected in writing to some of the following beliefs of Deobandi scholars.

- He opposed the belief of a founder of the Deobandi movement, Rashid Ahmad Gangohi, who stated that God has the ability to lie. This doctrine is called Imkan-i Kizb. Gangohi also supported the doctrine that God has the ability to make additional prophets after Muhammad (Imkan-i Nazir) and other prophets equal to Muhammad, a doctrine which was opposed by Ahmed Raza Khan Barelvi.
- He opposed the doctrine that Muhammad has not got extensive knowledge of the unseen (Ilm e Ghaib).

When Ahmed Raza Khan visited Mecca and Medina for pilgrimage in 1905, he prepared a draft document entitled Al Motamad Al Mustanad ("The Reliable Proofs"). In this work, Ahmad Raza branded Deobandi leaders such as Ashraf Ali Thanwi, Rashid Ahmad Gangohi, and Qasim Nanotwi and those who followed them as kuffar. Khan collected scholarly opinions in the Hejaz and compiled them in an Arabic language compendium with the title, Hussam al Harmain ("The Sword of Two Sanctuaries"), a work containing 34 verdicts from 33 ulama (20 Meccan and 13 Medinese). However, Deobandis claim the evidence provided to the scholars in Arabia were fabricated and that Ahmed Raza Khan's takfir of them was unjust, and this initiated a reciprocal series of fatwas between Barelvis and Deobandis which has lasted to the present.

=== Shia ===
Ahmed Raza Khan wrote various books against the beliefs and faith of Shia Muslims and declared various practices of Shia as kufr. He considered most Shiites of his day apostates because, he believed, they repudiated necessities of religion.

=== Wahhabi Movement ===
Ahmed Raza Khan declared Wahhabis as disbelievers (kuffar) and collected many fatwas of various scholars against the Wahhabi movement founded by Muhammad ibn Abd al-Wahhab, who was predominant in the Arabian peninsula, just as he had done with the Ahmadis and Deobandis. Until this day, Khan's followers remain opposed to the Wahhabi movement and their beliefs.

== Political views ==
Unlike other Muslim leaders in the region at the time, Khan and his movement opposed the Indian independence movement due to its leadership under Mahatma Gandhi, who was not a Muslim.

Imam Ahmed Raza Khan declared that India was Dar al-Islam and that Muslims enjoyed religious freedom there. According to him, those arguing the contrary merely wanted to take advantage of the provisions allowing Muslims living under the non-Muslim rule to collect interest from commercial transactions and had no desire to fight Jihad or perform Hijra. Therefore, he opposed labeling British India to be Dar al-Harb ("abode of war"), which meant that waging holy war against and migrating from India were inadmissible as they would cause disaster to the community. This view of Khan's was similar to other reformers Syed Ahmed Khan and Ubaidullah Al Ubaidi Suhrawardy.

The Muslim League mobilised the Muslim masses to campaign for Pakistan, and many of Khan's followers played a significant and active role in the Pakistan Movement at educational and political fronts.

== Legacy ==
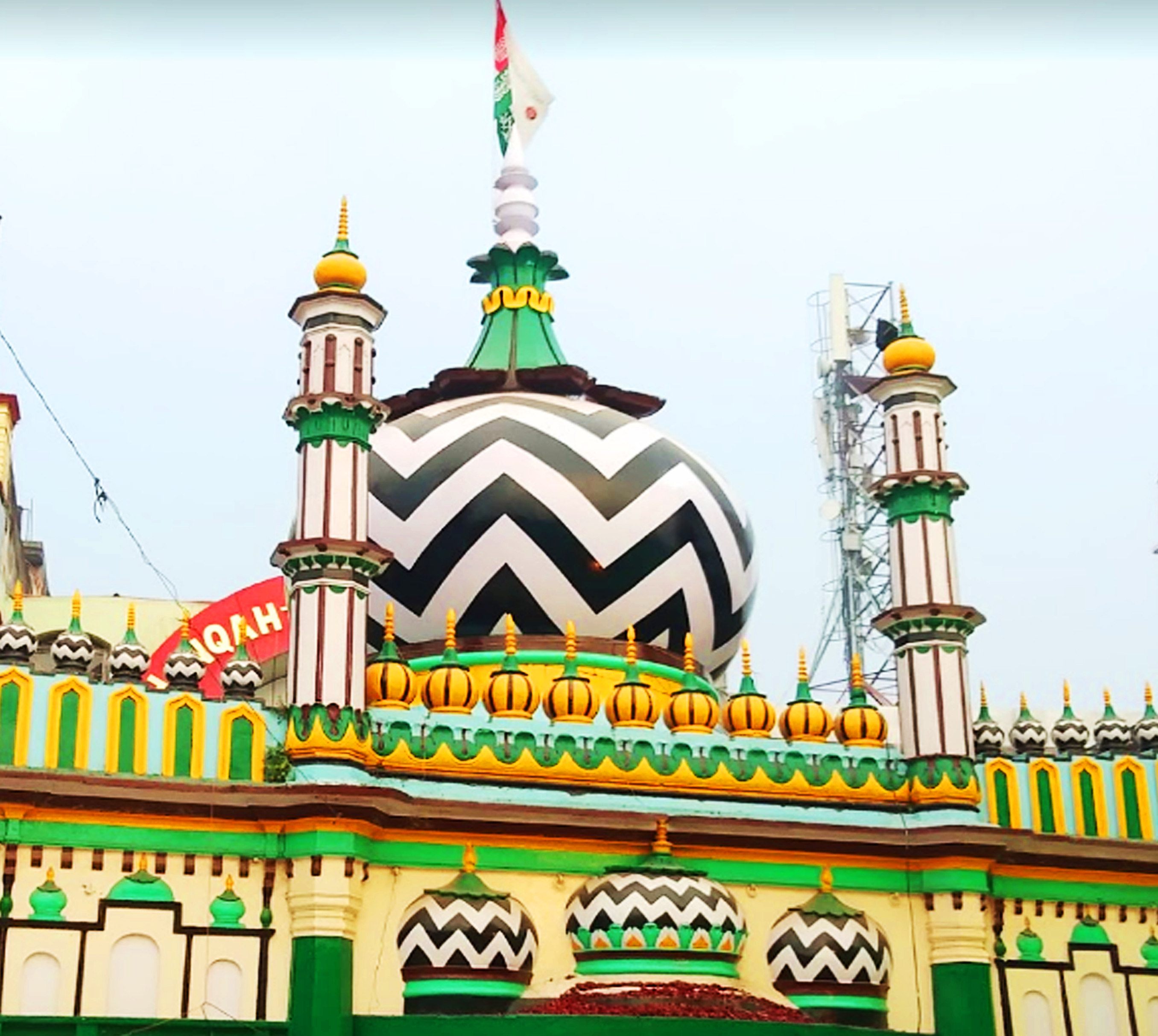
Shrine of Ahmad Raza Khan in Bareilly, India

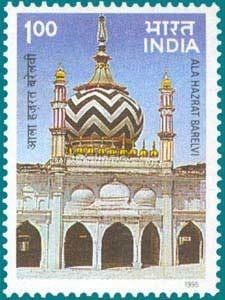
A commemorative postal stamp issued by Government of India

Many religious schools, organisations, and research institutions teach Khan's ideas, which emphasise the primacy of Islamic law along with the adherence to Sufi practices and personal devotion to Muhammad. Academic Francis Robinson described Khan as a polymath.

On 21 June 2010, Muhammad al-Yaqoubi, a cleric and Sufi from Syria, declared on Takbeer TV's program Sunni Talk that the Mujaddid of the Indian subcontinent was Ahmed Raza Khan Barelvi, and said that a follower of Ahlus Sunnah wal Jamaah can be identified by his love of Khan and that those outside of that those outside the Ahlus Sunnah are identified by their attacks on him.

Allama Muhammad Iqbal (1877–1938), a poet, Sufi, and philosopher, said: "I have carefully studied the decrees of Ahmed Raza and thereby formed this opinion; and his Fatawa bear testimony to his acumen, intellectual caliber, the quality of his creative thinking, his excellent jurisdiction and his ocean-like Islamic knowledge. Once Imam Ahmed Raza forms an opinion he stays firm on it; he expresses his opinion after a sober reflection. Therefore, the need never arises to withdraw any of his religious decrees and judgments. In another place he says, "Such a genius and intelligent jurist did not emerge."

Prof. Sir Ziauddin Ahmad, who was the head of the department of Mathematics at Aligarh Muslim University, was once unable to find solutions to some mathematic algorithms, even after he took help from the mathematicians abroad. He decided to visit Germany for the solution but at the request of his friend Sayyed Suleman Ashraf who was a professor of Islamic Studies at Aligarh Muslim University and also the mureed (disciple) of Ahmed Raza, Ziauddin visited Ahmed Raza on a special visit to get answers to his difficult questions, and under the guidance of Ahmed Raza he finally succeeded in getting solutions.

Justice Naeemud'deen, Supreme Court of Pakistan: "Maulana Ahmad Raza's grand personality, a representation of our most esteemed ancestors, is history-making, and a history uni-central in his self. ... You may estimate his high status from the fact that he spent all his life in expressing the praise of the great and auspicious Holy Prophet (صلی اللہ علیہ وسلم), in defending his veneration, in delivering speeches regarding his unique conduct, and in promoting and spreading the Law of Shariah which was revealed upon him for the entire humanity of all times. His renowned name is 'Muhammad' (صلی اللہ علیہ وسلم), the Prophet of Almighty Allah. ... The valuable books written by an encyclopedic scholar like Ahmed Raza, in my view, are the lamps of light that will keep enlightened and radiant the hearts and minds of the men of knowledge and insight for a long time."

Several places are named after Ahmad Raza Khan, such as:

- Ala Hazrat Express is an express train belonging to Indian Railways that runs between Bareilly and Bhuj in India.
- The Indian government issued a commemorative postal stamp in honor of Ahmad Raza Khan on 31 December 1995.
- Aala Hazrat Haj House Ghaziabad, Uttar Pradesh
- Aala Hazrat Hospital Ghaziabad, Uttar Pradesh
- Ala Hazrat Terminal, Bareilly Airport, Bareilly, Uttar Pradesh
- Raza Academy

== Spiritual successors ==
Imam Ahmed Raza Khan had two sons and five daughters. His sons Hamid Raza Khan and Mustafa Raza Khan Qadri are celebrated scholars of Islam. Hamid Raza Khan was his appointed successor. After him Mustafa Raza Khan succeeded his father, who then appointed Akhtar Raza Khan as his successor. His son, Mufti Asjad Raza Khan now succeeds him as the spiritual leader. He had many disciples and successors, including 30 in the Indian subcontinent and 35 elsewhere. The following scholars are his notable successors:

- Hamid Raza Khan (d. 1875/1943)
- Mustafa Raza Khan (d. 1892/1981)
- Amjad Ali Aazmi (d. 1882/1948)
- Muhammad Abdul Aleem Siddiqi
- Naeem-ud-Deen Muradabadi
- Zafaruddin Bihari (d. 1886/1962)
- Abul Muhamid al-Ashrafi al-Jilani (d. 1894/1961)
- Hashmat Ali Khan (d. 1901/1960)
- Maulana Ziauddin Madani (d. 1877/1981)

=== Educational influence ===
There are thousands of madrassas and Islamic seminaries dedicated to his school of thought across the Indian Subcontinent.

- Al Jamiatul Ashrafia is the main educational institute and learning center that provides Islam education.
- Raza Academy publishing house in Mumbai
- Imam Ahmed Raza Academy Durban, South Africa

== See also ==
- Dargah-e-Ala Hazrat
- Hassan Raza Khan
- Subhan Raza Khan
- Asjad Raza Khan
- Hamid Raza Khan
- Akhtar Raza Khan
- Mustafa Raza Khan
- Kaif Raza Khan
- Qamaruzzaman Azmi
- Amjad Ali Aazmi
- Ilyas Qadri

== Bibliography ==
- Baraka, A. (2003). A Saviour in a Dark World (Article). The Islamic Times, March 2003. Stockport, UK: Raza Academy.
- Bırişik, Abdulhamıd (2008). "RIZÂ HAN BİRELVÎ". TDV Encyclopedia of Islam, Vol. 35 (Resûlîler – Sak) (in Turkish). Istanbul: Presidency of Religious Affairs, Centre for Islamic Studies. pp. 61–64. ISBN 978-975-389-457-9.
- Haroon, Muhammad. (1994). The World Importance of Imam Ahmed Raza Khan Barelvi. Stockport, UK: Raza Academy. ISBN 9781873204122
- Imam, Muhammad Hassan. (2005). The Role of the Khulafa-e-Imam Ahmed Raza Khan in Pakistan Movement 1920–1947. Diss. Karachi: University of Karachi.
- Azimbadi, Badr. (2005).Great Personalities in Islam. Adam Publishers.
