= Jamda =

Jamda or JAMDA may refer to:

- Jiangda, Nagqu or Jamda, a village and a small township-level in Tibet, China
- Jamda, Mayurbhanj, a village and a block in Orissa, India
- Jamda Shahi, a village in Uttar Pradesh, India
- Journal of the American Medical Directors Association, a peer-reviewed medical journal
