= Syed Waseem Hussain =

Pakistani politician

- Incumbent
- Assumed office 29 February 2024
- Constituency: NA-220 Hyderabad-III

Member of the National Assembly of Pakistan
- In office 1 June 2013 – 31 May 2018
- Constituency: NA-220 (Hyderabad-II)

Personal details
- Born: Hyderabad, Sindh, Pakistan
- Party: MQM-P (2023-present)
- Other political affiliations: PSP (2018-2023); MQM-L (2008-2018)

Syed Waseem Hussain (Urdu: سید وسیم حسین; born 11 April 1972) is a Pakistani politician who had been a member of the National Assembly of Pakistan, from June 2013 to May 2018.

== Early life ==
He was born on 11 April 1972.

== Political career ==
He was elected to the Provincial Assembly of Sindh as a candidate of Muttahida Qaumi Movement – London (MQM-L) from PS-46 Hyderabad-IV in the 2008 Sindh provincial election. He received 74,116 votes and defeated Syed Fayyaz Ali Shah, a candidate of Pakistan People's Party (PPP).

He was elected to the National Assembly of Pakistan as a candidate of MQM from NA-220 (Hyderabad-II) in the 2013 Pakistani general election. He received 135,886 votes and defeated Abul Khair Muhammad Zubair, a candidate of Jamiat Ulema-e-Pakistan (Noorani).

In March 2018, he quit MQM and joined PSP.

On 12 January 2023, he joined MQM-P when PSP merged into it.

He was re-elected to the National Assembly as a candidate of MQM-P from NA-220 Hyderabad-III in the 2024 Pakistani general election. He received 64,531 votes and defeated Faisal Mughal, an independent candidate supported by Pakistan Tehreek-e-Insaf (PTI).
