= Masjid Abdul Aleem Siddique =

Mosque located in Telok Kurau, Singapore

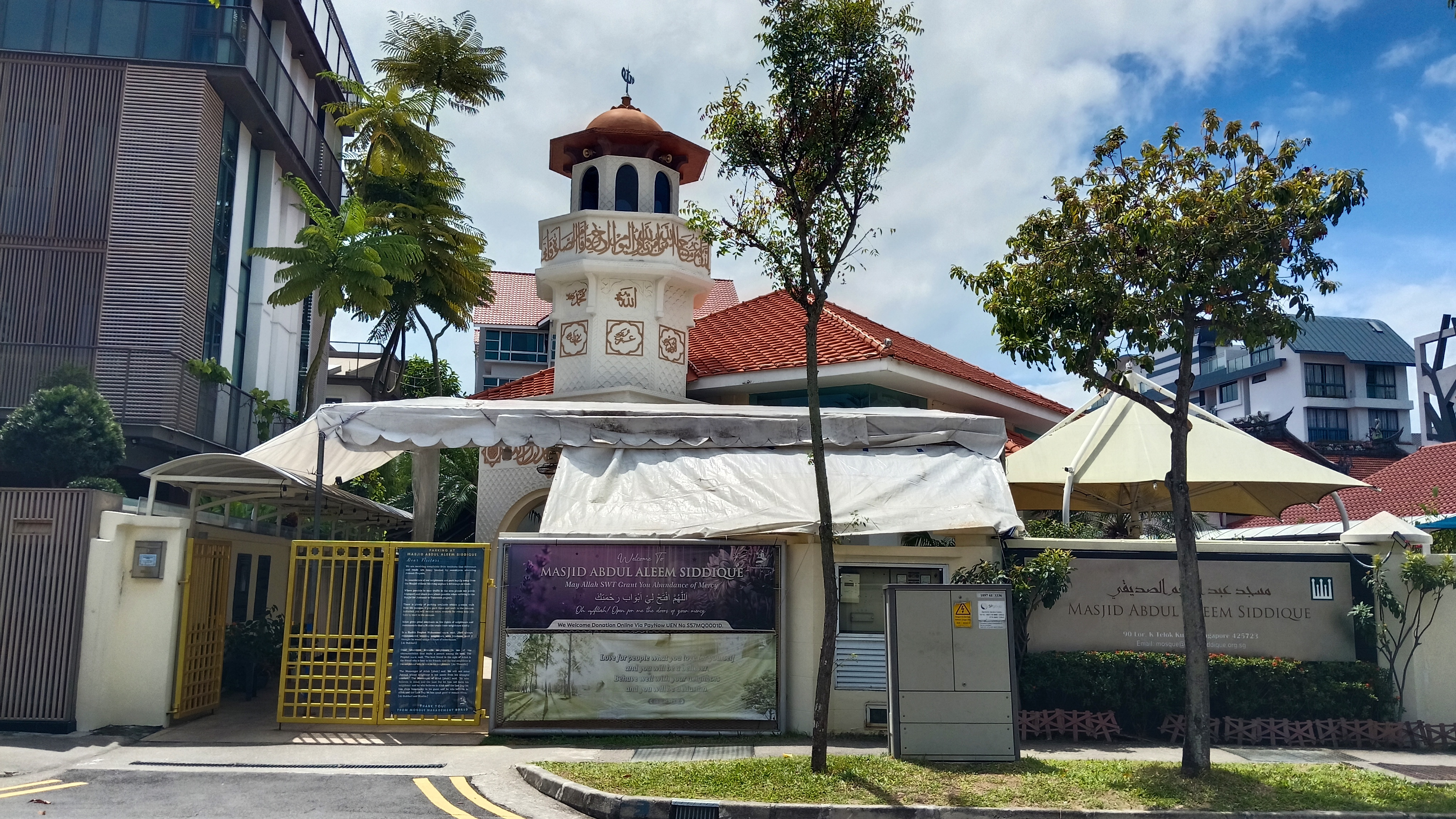

- Location in Singapore

Religion
- Affiliation: Sunni Islam

Location
- Location: 90 Lor K Telok Kurau, Singapore 425723
- Country: Singapore
- Interactive map of Masjid Abdul Aleem Siddique
- Coordinates: 1.3131814°N 103.9126872°E

Architecture
- Type: Mosque
- Style: Moroccan architecture
- Founder: Muhammad Abdul Aleem Siddiqi
- Completed: 1954
- Minaret: 1

Masjid Abdul Aleem Siddique (Jawi: مسجد عبد العليم صديق; literally Masjid ʿAbd al-ʿAlīm Ṣiddīq) is a mosque located in the Telok Kurau residential enclave between Geylang and Katong, Singapore. Built in 1957, the mosque is named after Muhammad Abdul Aleem Siddiqi, a Muslim missionary and the founder of Jamiyah Singapore who propagated Islam in the Malay Peninsula in the 1950s.

== Background ==
Muhammad Abdul Aleem Siddiqi (1892–1954) was a Barelwi missionary and the founder of the All Malaya Muslim Missionary Society, later known as Jamiyah Singapore. Siddiqi travelled for over forty years to preach Islam, arriving in countries such as Singapore, Malaysia, Trinidad, Spain and The Philippines. He also led the first Eid prayer in Pakistan in the presence of Muhammad Ali Jinnah. Siddiqi died in 1954 and was buried in the Jannat al-Baqi cemetery in Medina, Saudi Arabia.

== History ==
Before the construction of the mosque, a small surau stood along Lorong K of the Telok Kurau neighbourhood. In 1930, Abdul Aleem Siddiqi and his followers raised funds to buy the land and release it as waqf for the construction of a mosque. Once the funds were sufficient, the surau was demolished and a new mosque was built from the ground up, completed in 1957. Air-conditioners were installed in the main prayer hall in 1989. In 2005, the mosque was renovated extensively to increase its capacity.

== See also ==
- Masjid Jamiyah Ar-Rabitah
- List of mosques in Singapore
