= Jamiyah Singapore =

Singaporean non-governmental religious organization

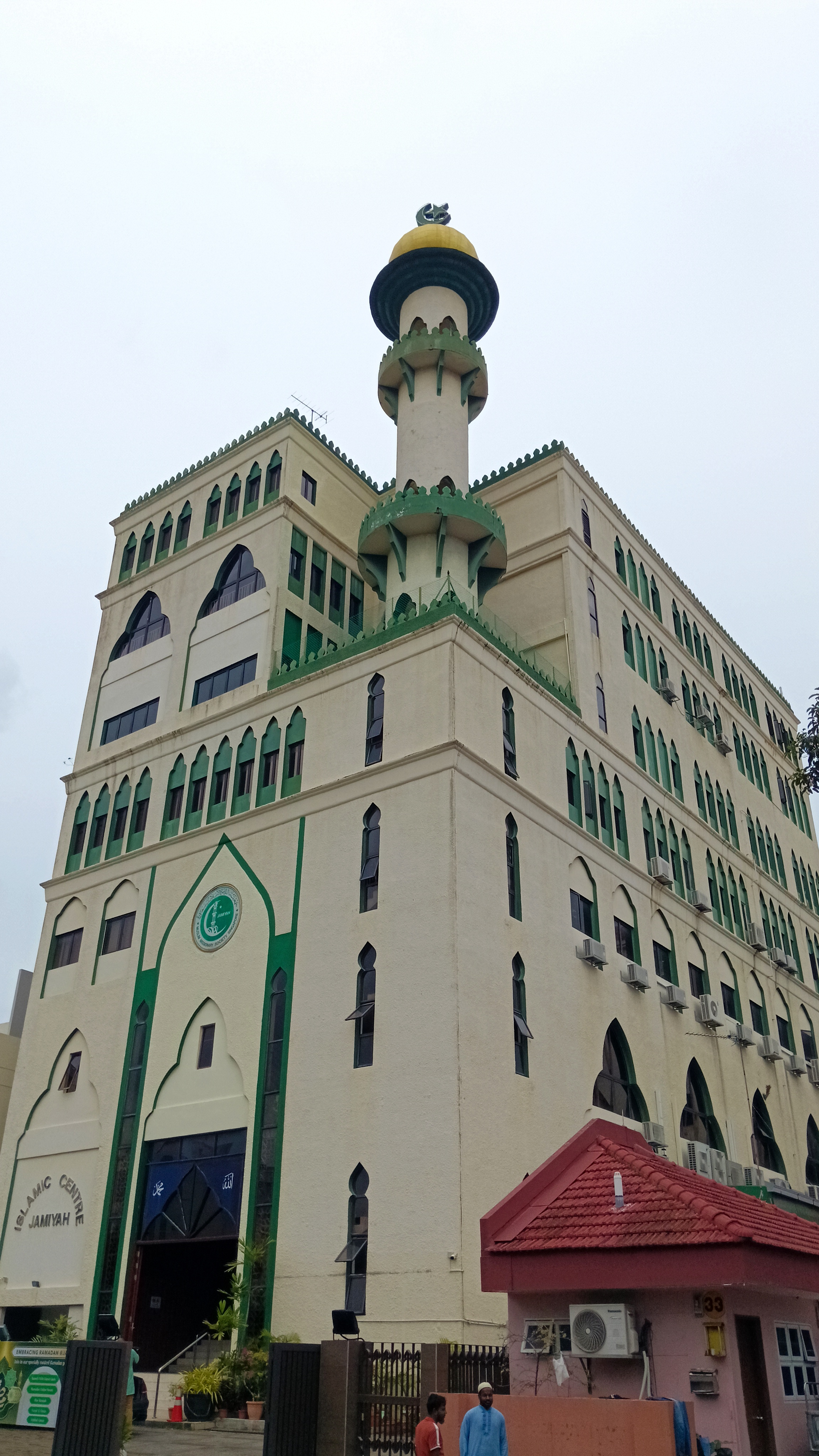
- Jamiyah Singapore headquarters in Geylang.
- Formation: 1932
- Founder: Muhammad Abdul Aleem Siddiqi
- Founded at: Singapore
- Headquarters: Islamic Centre Jamiyah
- Current president: Mohammed Hasbi Abu Bakar
- Affiliations: Sunni Islam
- Website: https://www.jamiyah.org.sg/

Jamiyah Singapore, formerly known as the All Malaya Muslim Missionary Society, is a non-governmental Sunni Muslim organization based in Singapore. It was founded in 1932 by Muhammad Abdul Aleem Siddiqi, a Muslim missionary who travelled worldwide to propagate Islam. Likewise, the aim of the organization is to promote and preach Islam in Singapore.

== History ==
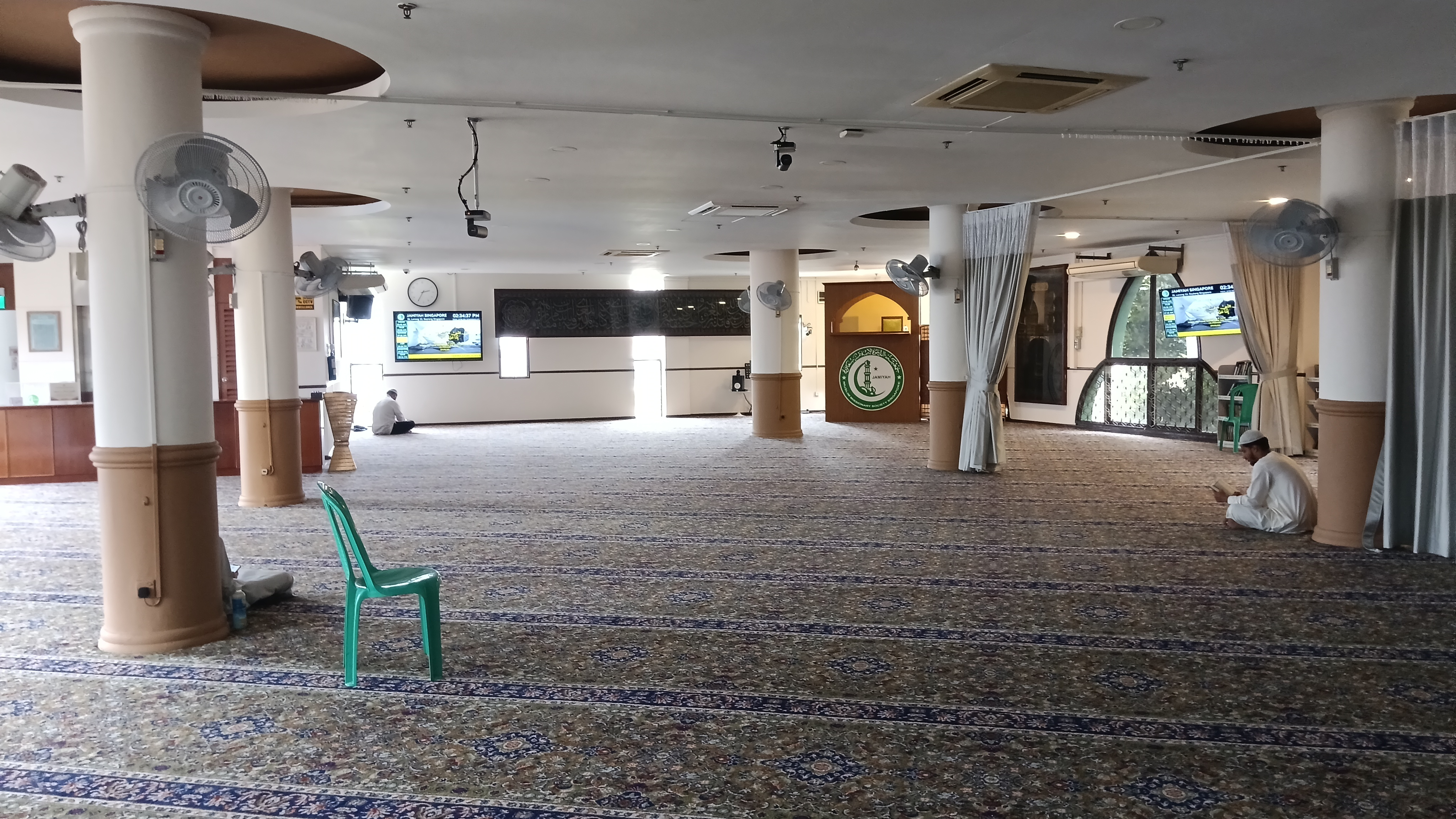
The Islamic Centre Jamiyah was built in 1985, as a complete reconstruction of an older structure that stood at the site.

Muhammad Abdul Aleem Siddiqi, a follower of the Barelwi movement, established the All Malaya Muslim Missionary Society in 1932 to propagate Islam in Singapore as a form of dakwah. This was one of Siddiqi's many exploits to propagate Islam; he had also travelled to Malaysia and The Philippines to preach the Islamic religion. The movement at the time was led by both Siddiqi and Syed Ibrahim Omar Alsagoff, the latter who was the first president of the organization.

In 1981, Jamiyah Singapore hosted one of the biggest local Mawlid festivals, which was reportedly attended by more than 45,000 congregants.

The Islamic Centre Jamiyah, located at the edge of Geylang, is the main headquarters of the organization. Although the founder of the organization is a follower of the Barelwi movement, the organization itself is non-denominational and considers itself to be a mainstream modernized Sunni Islamic institution.

== Services ==
Jamiyah Singapore runs various social services which include a kindergarten, nursing home, halfway house as well as zakat collection points. From 1993 to 2021, they also ran a children's home.

Three mosques in Singapore have been founded by the organization as well. The first is Masjid Abdul Aleem Siddique at Telok Kurau, built in 1957 after Abdul Aleem Siddiqi had raised funds to build the mosque. The second is Masjid Jamiyah Ar-Rabitah at Tiong Bahru, built in 1962 and later rebuilt in 1985. The third is a mosque located on the second level of the Jamiyah Islamic Centre at Geylang.
