= Shah Owais Noorani =

Pakistani politician

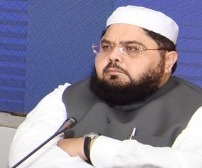

Special Assistant to the Prime Minister
- In office 23 June 2022 – 10 August 2023
- President: Arif Alvi
- Prime Minister: Shehbaz Sharif

Personal details
- Party: JUP-N (2017-present)
- Relations: Muhammad Abdul Aleem Siddiqi (grandfather)
- Parent: Shah Ahmad Noorani (father)

Shah Muhammad Owais Noorani Siddiqui is a Pakistani politician who has served as Special Assistant to the Prime Minister and currently serving as General Secretary of Jamiat Ulema-e-Pakistan's (Imam-Noorani) faction.
