= Shaikh Salahuddin =

Shaikh Salahuddin may refer to:

- Sheikh Salahuddin (Karachi politician) (born 1956)
- Shaikh Salahuddin (Hyderabad politician) (fl. 2008)
- Sheikh Salahuddin (cricketer) (1969–2013)
