= Ilyas Burney =

Indian economist

Professor Muhammad Ilyas (Elias) Burney (1890–1958) was the first head of Department of Economics at Osmania University, Hyderabad, India. He published about 40 books in Urdu, Persian, Arabic and English. He wrote the first book about Economics in Urdu, for which Sir Muhammad Iqbal complimented him in 1917. His other books in economics included Ilm ul Maaeshat (Knowledge of Economics), Muqaddima e Maashiyat (Treatise of Economics / Translation) and Indian Economics.

Burney is particularly known for his monumental work on the Ahmadiyya religion. His Urdu book. Qadiani Muzhab (Ahmadiyya Faith), is considered a comprehensive study on the subject. It was also translated into Arabic as Adiyanatul al Qadianiah by Maulana Abdul Quddoos Nadvi. Among his other quoted books are Mishkat-us-Salawat, which is a collection of poetry in praise of the Islamic prophet Muhammad. He was also appointed by Muhammed Ali Jinnah to the Planning Committee of Pakistan. However, after the partition of India he decided to remain in India.

He was born at Khorja district Bulandshahr, Uttar Pradesh, British India on 19 April 1890. An award-winning student throughout, after his initial education at Khorja high school he went on to Aligarh Muslim College & University to finish his MA & LLB with distinction. At Aligarh he associated himself with Ziauddin Ahmed in the promotion of the university and also taught economics there to BA classes for two years. Character building of youth was his favourite theme. His acquaintances and friends liked their sons to be in his company. A keen athlete and sportsman himself since his younger days he encouraged youth to participate in sports activities. At Osmania he was the President of the Football Club. Nizam of Hyderabad entrusted to him the role of tutor to the royal princes Prince Mukarram Jah and his brother Muqaffamjah.

In 1917, the government of the Nizam urgently sought his services for the newly created Translation Bureau as a translator of economics (for translation from English and other languages into Urdu). From there he moved on to teach at Osmania University and in due course assumed the position of head of the economics department. As he continued to serve at Osmania University, some of the other positions he held there included Director of Translation Bureau, Director of Dairatul Maarif and Registrar of the University.

One his books called Urdu Hindi Rasmulkhat (Scripts) - a comparative study of Urdu and Hindi scripts Maulvi Abdul Haq commented that the book is a "great national service which must be commended". These also included Bertanwi Hukumat e Hind(Sociology), Hizbullah (Azkars), Asrare Haq (Maarifat), Mishkatus Salat (Arabic, Salat & Darood), Sirat ul Hameed, Tas-heel-ut-Tarteel (Tajweed), Islam (English), Maarooza (his own poetry) and selections from Urdu and Persian Naats & other poetry, Maarif-e-Millat (Urdu poetry), Manazir-e-Qudrat (Literature), Jazbat-e-Fitrat, Tohfa-e-Mohammadi and Jawahir-e-Sukhan (Persian). Mawlana Abdul Aleem Siddiqi in his discussion with George Bernard Shaw has mentioned that he presented Shaw with Professor Ilyas Burney's book Islam.

Burney twice went on pilgrimage to Haramain shareef and wrote the account of his travels in his travelogue Sirath-ul-Hameed. On the first occasion he also visited Iraq, Syria and Palestine and was accompanied on the trip by Bahr-Ul-Uloom Maulana Moulvi Muhammad Abdul Qadeer Siddiqi Qadri.

He died at Bulandshahr on 25 January 1958 when he returned there from Hyderabad after a gap of many years to visit his ailing brother and sister.
