= NA-220 Hyderabad-III =

Constituency of the National Assembly of Pakistan

- Constituency for the National Assembly of Pakistan
- Region: Latifabad Tehsil (partly), Qasimabad Tehsil (partly) and Hyderabad City and Cantonment areas of Hyderabad District
- Electorate: 461,032

Current constituency
- Party: Muttahida Qaumi Movement – Pakistan
- Member: Syed Waseem Hussain
- Created from: NA-220 Hyderabad-III

NA-220 Hyderabad-III (این اے-220، حیدرآباد-3) is a constituency for the National Assembly of Pakistan.

== Assembly Segments ==
Constituency number	Constituency	District	Current MPA	Party
64	PS-64 Hyderabad-V	Hyderabad District	Muhammad Rashid Khan	MQM-P
65	PS-65 Hyderabad-VI	Hyderabad District	Nasir Hussain Qureshi	MQM-P

== Members of Parliament ==
=== 2018–2023: NA-227 Hyderabad-III ===
Election	Member	Party
2018	Shaikh Salahuddin	MQM-P

=== 2024–present: NA-220 Hyderabad-III ===
Election	Member	Party
2024	Syed Waseem Hussain	MQM-P

== Election 2002 ==
General elections were held on 10 October 2002. Sahibzada Abul Khair Muhammad Zubair of Muttahida Majlis-e-Amal won by 41,190 votes.

General election 2002: NA-220 Hyderabad-III
Party	Candidate	Votes	%	±%
MMA	Abul Khair Muhammad Zubair	41,190	45.39	
MQM	Aftab Ahmed Shaikh	40,580	44.72	
PPP	Mohammad Irfan Qureshi	3,579	3.94	
Others	Others (eight candidates)	5,391	5.95	
Turnout		91,937	33.60	
Total valid votes		90,740	98.70	
Rejected ballots		1,197	1.30	
Majority		610	0.67	
Registered electors		273,607		

== Election 2008 ==
General elections were held on 18 February 2008. Salahuddin of Muttahida Qaumi Movement won by 147,040 votes.

General election 2008: NA-220 Hyderabad-III
Party	Candidate	Votes	%	±%
MQM	Salahuddin	147,040	84.13	
PPP	Irfan Qureshi	24,108	13.79	
Others	Others (seven candidates)	3,633	2.08	
Turnout		176,647	48.26	
Total valid votes		174,781	98.94	
Rejected ballots		1,866	1.06	
Majority		122,932	70.34	
Registered electors		366,024		
MQM gain from MMA				

== Election 2013 ==
General elections were held on 11 May 2013. Syed Waseem Hussain of Muttahida Qaumi Movement – London won by 135,886 votes and became the member of National Assembly.

General election 2013: NA-220 Hyderabad-III
Party	Candidate	Votes	%	±%
MQM	Syed Waseem Hussain	135,886	83.30	
JUP (N)	Abul Khair Muhammad Zubair	10,990	6.74	
PPP	Mohammad Sagheer	10,522	6.45	
MDM	Bilal Ahmed	4,410	2.70	
Others	Others (seven candidates)	1,327	0.81	
Turnout		164,656	60.03	
Total valid votes		163,135	99.08	
Rejected ballots		1,521	0.92	
Majority		124,896	76.56	
Registered electors		274,281		
MQM hold				

== Election 2018 ==
General elections were held on 25 July 2018.

General election 2018: NA-227 Hyderabad-III
Party	Candidate	Votes	%	±%
MQM-P	Shaikh Salahuddin	52,053	35.85	
PTI	Muhammad Hakim	41,513	28.59	
JUP	Abul Khair Muhammad Zubair	20,509	14.12	
TLP	Salahuddin	12,832	8.84	
MMA	Karamat Ali Rajpoot	8,330	5.74	
PSP	Abdul Rasheed Arain	6,181	4.26	
Others	Others (six candidates)	3,787	2.60	
Turnout		148,399	39.89	
Total valid votes		145,203	97.85	
Rejected ballots		3,196	2.15	
Majority		10,540	7.26	
Registered electors		372,026		
MQM-P^{†} hold		Swing	N/A	

^{†}MQM-P is considered heir apparent to MQM

== Election 2024 ==
Elections were held on 8 February 2024. Syed Waseem Hussain won the election with 64,531 votes.

General election 2024: NA-220 Hyderabad-III
Party	Candidate	Votes	%	±%
MQM-P	Syed Waseem Hussain	64,531	36.81	▲0.96
PTI	Faisal Mughal (Note: Filed nomination papers as PTI candidate but ECP allowed him to run as an Independent)	52,025	29.67	▲1.08
PPP	Waseem Khan Rajput	28,099	16.03	
Others	Others (thirty-five candidates)	30,669	17.49	
Turnout		177,960	38.60	▼1.29
Total valid votes		175,324	98.52	
Rejected ballots		2,636	1.48	
Majority		12,506	7.13	▼0.13
Registered electors		461,032		
MQM-P hold				

== See also ==
- NA-219 Hyderabad-II
- NA-221 Tando Muhammad Khan
