= Ahmad Nurani =

Pakistani Islamic scholar and politician (1926–2003)

Ahmad Noorani
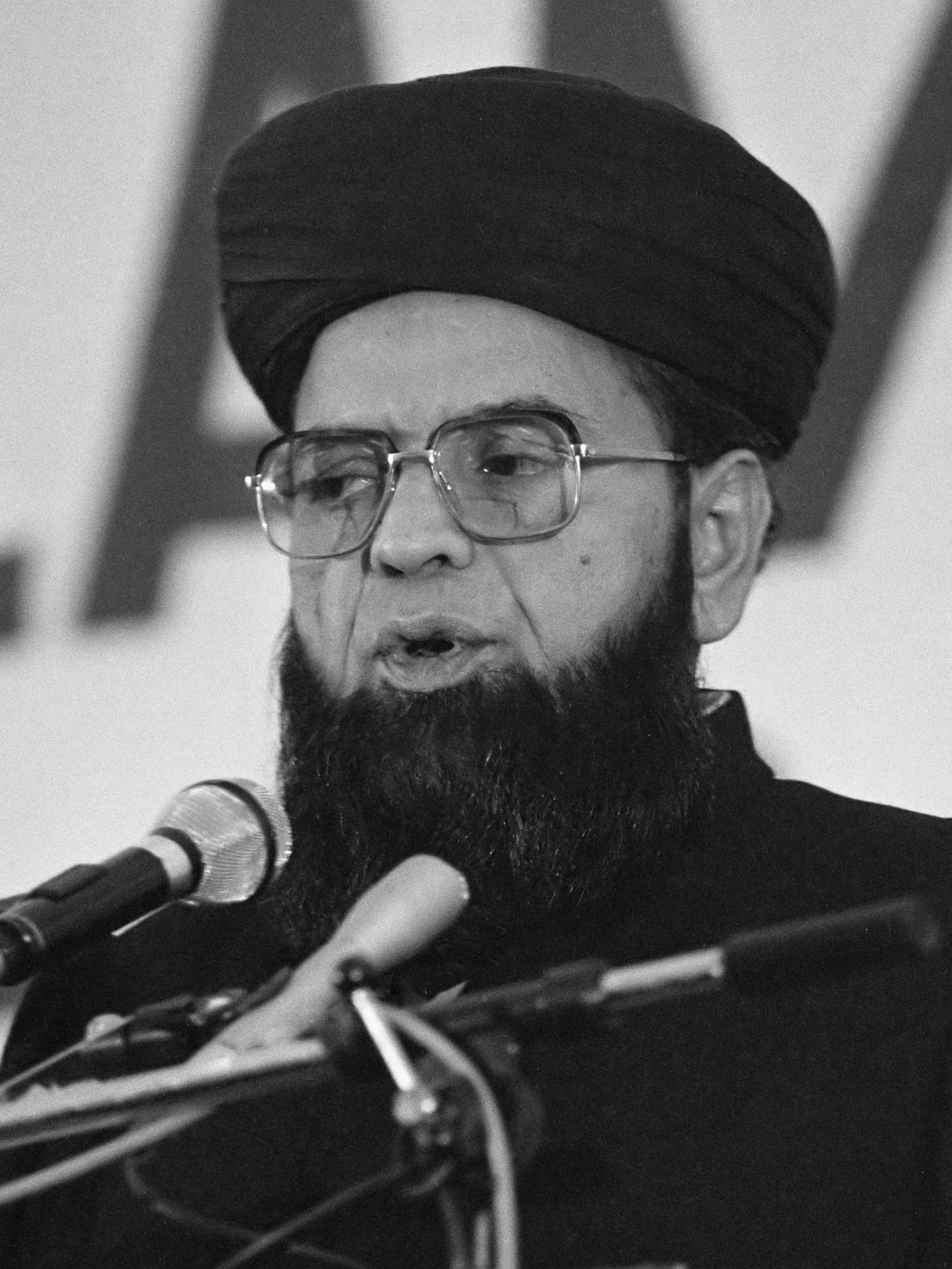
- Ahmad Noorani in 1985

President of the Muttahida Majlis-e-Amal
- In office 9 October 2002 – 11 December 2003
- Preceded by: Office created
- Succeeded by: Qazi Hussain Ahmad

Member of National Assembly of Pakistan
- In office 14 April 1972 – 7 March 1977
- Constituency: NW-134 (Karachi-VII)

Personal details
- Born: Shah Ahmad Noorani Siddiqi; 1 October 1926 Meerut, India
- Died: 11 December 2003 (aged 77) Islamabad, Pakistan
- Resting place: Abdullah Shah Ghazi Mausoleum
- Citizenship: Pakistan
- Party: Jamiat Ulema-e-Pakistan; 1970–2002
- Relations: Fazlur Rahman Ansari (brother-in-law)
- Children: Owais
- Parent: Muhammad Abdul Aleem Siddiqi
- Education: Allahabad University; Darul-Uloom Arabia, Meerut

Philosophical work
- Era: 20th Century
- Region: Islamic world
- School: Sunni (Barelvism)
- Main interests: Islamic philosophy Modernity
- Notable ideas: Revival of Shia-Sunni relations

Shah Ahmad Noorani Siddiqi (Note: Urdu: شاہ احمد نورانی صدیقی, romanized: Shāh ʾAḥmad Noorānī Ṣiddīqī) (1 October 1926 – 11 December 2003) was a Pakistani Islamic scholar and politician. He was the founder and first president of the Muttahida Majlis-e-Amal (MMA) from 2002 until his death in 2003. He served as the president of Jamiat Ulema-e-Pakistan (JUP) from the 1970s until his death.

The JUP was the main Barelvi political party of Pakistan until the establishment of Tehreek-e-Labbaik Pakistan in 2015. Siddiqi was a co-founder of the World Islamic Mission.

Active in politics since the 1970s, agitating against military dictator General Zia-ul-Haq in the 1980s, and after disassociating from politics during most of the 1990s, he made a notable comeback after rigorously opposing the regime of President Pervez Musharraf and further forming an ultra–conservative alliance for joint opposition to the regime. Assuming the presidency of Muttahida Majlis-e-Amal (MMA), he was known to use tough rhetoric against Musharraf and formed a public support against Musharraf's policies in the country.

== Early life and education ==
Ahmad Nurani was born in Meerut, British India (now Uttar Pradesh, India), into an Urdu-speaking Siddiqui Shaikh family on 31 March 1926 (17 Ramadan 1344). His father, Abdul Aleem Siddiqi was also an Islamic scholar and had accompanied him on Islamic missionary tours to various parts of the world in his early youth.

He received his BA degree in Arabic language from the Allahabad University, and certified from the Darul-Uloom in Meerut in Islamic jurisprudence. He became a hafiz-ul-Quran at the age of eight. His family moved to Karachi, Sindh, Pakistan after the partition of India.

He established himself as Islamic scholar and worked in the developing the Islamic philosophy as well as helping found the World Islamic Mission, based in Mecca, Saudi Arabia in 1972.

He has been described as a polyglot who "was conversant with 17 languages and eloquent in six, Urdu, Arabic, English, Persian, French and Swahili."

== Political career ==
=== Member of National Assembly ===
Nurani was elected as member of the National Assembly from Constituency NW-134 (Karachi-VII) after participating in general elections held in 1970 on Jamiat Ulema-e-Pakistan's platform.

The second time he was elected as MNA from Constituency NA-167 (Hyderabad-II) in 1977 Pakistani general election. Since then, his influence on national politics further grew and he became a Senator in 1980s.

=== Role for strengthening democracy in Pakistan ===
Nurani took stand against the martial law regime of Muhammad Zia-ul-Haq. His party was one of the founding members of Pakistan National Alliance (PNA) formed on January 10, 1977 and “Pakistan Awami Ittihad” (PAI) in 1988.

During Zia's regime, he raised his voice for the rehabilitation of the political parties, restoration of the judicial powers and finishing the military courts, elimination of the Martial law; and announcement of the election schedule. He was also guiding force for the formation of another electoral alliance Islami Jamhuri Mahaz in May 1999. Through his efforts, Nurani, formed an alliance of six religious, political parties, named as the Muttahida Majlis-i-Amal (MMA), came into being in 2001. He was chosen as its founding President.

== Religious views ==
Nurani argued with ideologies such as the Deobandism and Wahhabism and most strictly with the Qadiani. He spent his scholarly life in promoting Barelvism and Ahmad Raza Khan as the Mujaddid (Islamic reviver) of the 14th Islamic century.

== Death ==
On 11 December 2003 (17 Shawwal 1424), Nurani died when he was preparing to leave his residence for the Parliament House to address a press conference along with other opposition leaders at noon.The 78-year old religious scholar was struck by a fatal cardiac seizure at his residence in Islamabad, his assistants said. The funeral prayer was done in Nishtar Park on Friday and he was buried at the foot of his mother in the graveyard situated in the premises of the Abdullah Shah Ghazi Mausoleum in Karachi.

== Condolences ==
Pervez Musharraf expressed profound grief in a condolence message in which he paid tribute to Nurani for his "great services for Pakistan and his tremendous contributions to national politics. MMA General Secretary Maulana Fazal-ur-Rehman described the passing away of Nurani as a "great loss for the whole nation." Fazal said Nurani was a "moderate, polite and kind person and due to his qualities he was elected as chief of the united religious front.

== Theological and doctrinal writings ==
Shah Ahmad Noorani Siddiqi was a prolific author of theological works rooted in the Sunni-Hanafi (Maturidi) tradition, defending traditional Barelvi positions, and exploring key doctrinal questions. The following are notable among his works:

- اسما و صفات (Asmāʼ wa Ṣifāt) – Published by the World Islamic Mission (Karachi) in the 1980s–1990s, this work deals with the divine names and attributes of Allah in accordance with Ashʿari and Maturidi theology. Noorani refutes literalist and anthropomorphic interpretations, emphasizing the transcendence of God.
- عظمتِ مصطفیٰ (ʿAẓmat‑e‑Muṣṭafā) – A devotional-theological treatise upholding the exalted status of the Prophet Muhammad. The book elaborates on his spiritual rank, miracles, and intercessory role (tawassul), reflecting core Barelvi positions.
- رؤیتِ باری تعالیٰ (Ruʾyat‑e‑Bārī Taʿālā) – A theological defense of the Sunni belief in the beatific vision (ruʾya) of God in the afterlife. The book argues against anthropomorphism while maintaining the orthodox position affirmed by the majority of Ahl al-Sunnah.
- رسالہ فی علم الغیب (Risāla fī ʿIlm al‑Ghayb) – A concise Urdu treatise supporting the belief in the Prophet's knowledge of the unseen (ʿilm al-ghayb). Noorani affirms that such knowledge is divinely granted and not comparable to divine omniscience

Many of these works were published in pamphlet or booklet format and distributed through the World Islamic Mission, which Shah Noorani co-founded. Their influence persists within Barelvi madrasas and among Urdu-speaking Sunni communities worldwide.
