= Abul Khair Muhammad Zubair =

Pakistani politician

Sahibzada Abul Khair Muhammad Zubair
- صاحبزادہ ابوالخیر محمد زبیر

Member of the National Assembly of Pakistan
- In office 16 November 2002 – 15 November 2007
- Succeeded by: Salahuddin
- Constituency: NA-220 (Hyderabad-III)
- Majority: 41,190 votes

Personal details
- Born: Sahibzada Abul Khair Muhammad Zubair
- Party: Jamiat Ulama-e-Pakistan (Noorani)
- Other political affiliations: Muttahida Majlis-e-Amal
- Children: Dr. Uzair Mahmood Al-Azhari, Sahibzada Faaiz Mahmood, Aatir Mahmood
- Occupation: Politician

Sahibzada Abul Khair Muhammad Zubair is a Pakistani politician who had been a member of the National Assembly of Pakistan from 2002 to 2007.

== Political career ==
He was elected to the National Assembly as a candidate of Muttahida Majlis-e-Amal from Constituency NA-220 (Hyderabad-III) in the 2002 Pakistani general election. He received 41,190 votes and defeated Aftab Ahmed Shaikh of Muttahida Qaumi Movement.
