= Aleemiyah Institute of Islamic Studies =

University in Karachi, Sindh, Pakistan

- جامعہ علیمیہ اسلامیہ
- Seal of Aleemiyah Institute of Islamic Studies
- Motto: ليتفقهوا في الدين (Arabic)
- Motto in English: "They could devote themselves to studies in religion"
- Established: July 1964
- Founders: Muhammad Fazlur Rahman Ansari
- Affiliations: University of Karachi
- Principal: Imran N. Hosein (Past); Abu Fahim Anwarullah (current)
- Location: Karachi, Sindh, Pakistan
- Website: www.wfim.org.pk

The Aleemiyah Institute of Islamic Studies (Urdu: جامعہ علیمیہ اسلامیہ) (or Islamic Center) is a university of Islamic & Modern Sciences located in Karachi, Sindh, Pakistan. The institution is run by the World Federation of Islamic Missions.

== History ==
The Aleemiyah Institute of Islamic Studies was established in July 1964 by Dr. Muhammad Fazlur Rahman al-Ansari al-Qadri, the Founder President of the World Federation of Islamic Missions. Trinidadian Islamic scholar Imran Nazar Hosein completed his studies at the institute.

== See also ==
- List of Islamic educational institutions
- Islam in Pakistan
- Sufi Saints of South Asia
- Muhammad Abdul Aleem Siddiqi
- University of Karachi
