= Islamic Centre Jamiyah =

Islamic cultural centre located in Geylang, Singapore

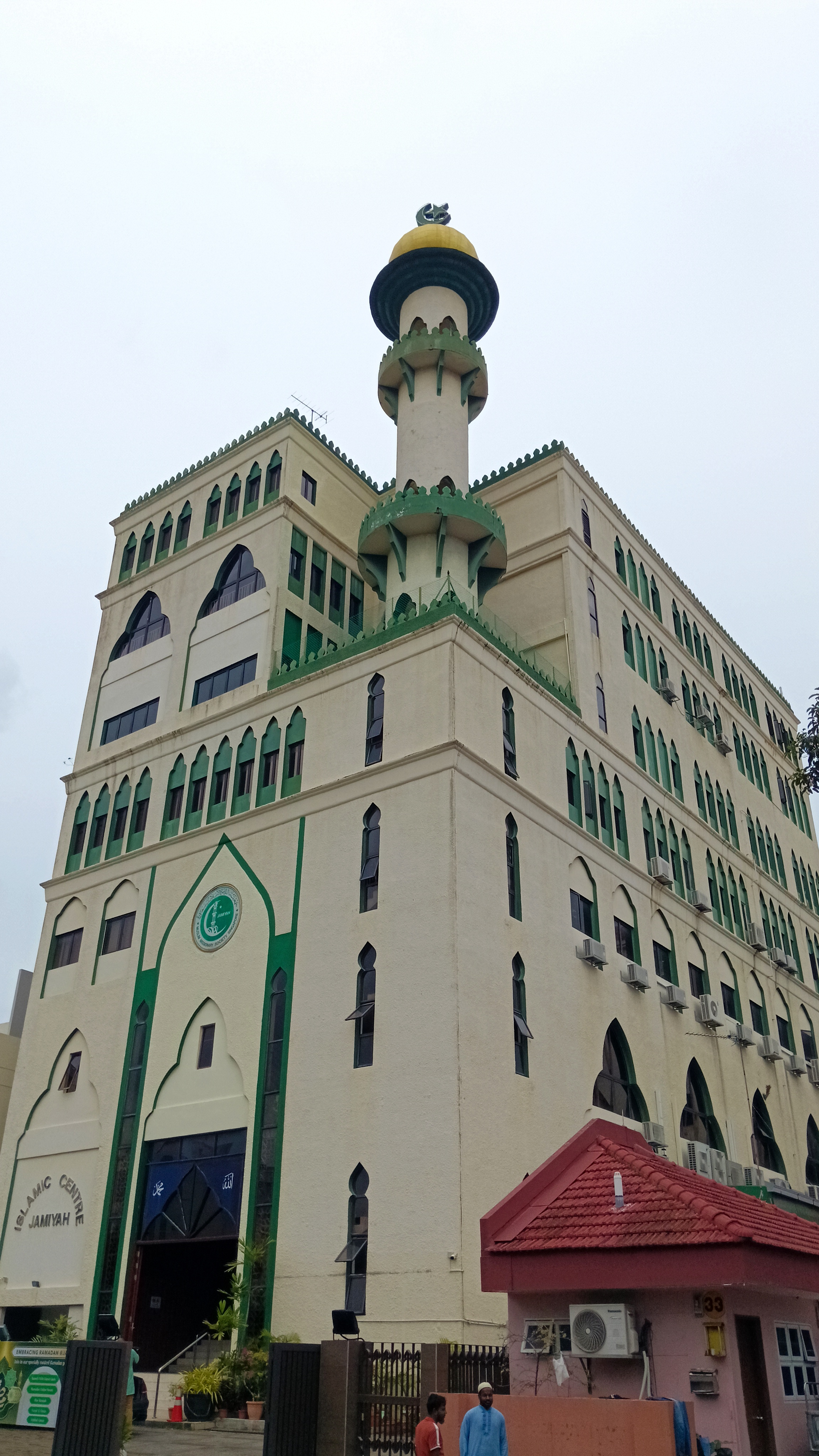

- Location in Singapore

Religion
- Affiliation: Sunni Islam

Location
- Location: 31 Lor 12 Geylang, Singapore 399006
- Country: Singapore
- Coordinates: 1.3103172°N 103.8788156°E

Architecture
- Type: Islamic cultural centre, conference hall, and mosque
- Style: Indo-Saracenic architecture
- Founder: Jamiyah Singapore
- Completed: 1985
- Minaret: 1

Website
- https://www.jamiyah.org.sg/our-history

The Islamic Centre Jamiyah (Malay: Pusat Islam Jamiyah; Arabic: مركز الجامعة الاسلامي; transliterated Markaz al-Jāmi‘ah al-Islāmī) is an Islamic cultural centre located in Geylang, Singapore. It is the main headquarters of the Jamiyah Singapore organization. Although the centre was established as early as 1932, the current building, which contains a mosque, conference hall, and offices, was opened in 1985.

== History ==
The centre was founded in 1932 as a single-story building. It was destroyed during World War II (1941–1945) and was hence completely rebuilt in 1949. Later in 1967, the centre was rebuilt again and renamed as the King Faisal Muslim Lecture Hall, in recognition of the Faisal bin Abdulaziz Al Saud who financed a complete reconstruction of the place. The centre was then torn down and reconstructed from the ground up in the 1980s, before being reopened in 1985 as a new four-storey building which contained a mosque, offices and general headquarters for the Jamiyah Singapore organization. The construction of the mosque was financed by the Angullia family that was also responsible for building Masjid Angullia at Farrer Park, Masjid Haji Yusoff at Upper Serangoon, and reconstructing Masjid Kebun Limau at Whampoa. The building was later upgraded in 1997, with three more storeys added to the top of the building.

== Transportation ==
The Jamiyah Islamic Centre is located along Lorong 12 Geylang, with bus services 7, 70 and 197 all leading to Lorong 14 Geylang, the road located just opposite it. The nearest MRT stations are Kallang on the East–West Line, and Stadium on the Circle Line.

== See also ==
- Masjid Haji Mohamed Salleh
- Masjid Khadijah
