= Fazlur Rahman Ansari =

Pakistani Sunni Islamic scholar, 1914–1974

Muhammad Fazlur Rahman Ansari

Personal life
- Born: 14 August 1914 Saharanpur, British India
- Died: 6 June 1974 (aged 59) Karachi, Pakistan
- Education: Aligarh Muslim University
- Relations: Muhammad Abdul Aleem Siddiqi (father-in-law); Shah Ahmad Noorani (brother-in-law)

Religious life
- Religion: Islam
- Denomination: Sunni
- Founder of: Aleemiyah Institute of Islamic Studies
- Jurisprudence: Hanafi
- Creed: Maturidi
- Movement: Barelvi

Muslim leader
- Students: Imran N. Hosein

Muhammad Fazlur Rahman Ansari (14 August 1914 – 3 June 1974) was a Pakistani Islamic scholar and philosopher.

He was the founder of the Aleemiyah Institute of Islamic Studies and Founder President of the World Federation of Islamic Missions.

== Early life and education ==
Muhammad was born in Saharanpur, British India, on 14 August 1914.

At the age of six and a half years, he memorised the Quran at the Madrassah Islamiah of Muzaffarnagar, Uttar Pradesh.

In 1933, Ansari enrolled for his BA degree at the Aligarh Muslim University, and majored in philosophy, English and Arabic. He eventually earned a PhD in philosophy.

He was later trained by Abdul Aleem Siddiqi, his future father-in-law, in the mid-1930s as the Resident-Missionary and Editor of Genuine Islam.

== Later life and death ==
He migrated to Pakistan in 1947, on the advice of his father-in-law, the scholar Muhammad Abdul Aleem Siddiqi, he worked with him to defend Sunni-Barelvi practices and traditions such as Mawlid and Ziarah.

He died in Karachi in 1974, few weeks before turning 60, during his last years being a teacher of Islamic Studies at the Karachi University.

== Books and booklets ==
His books and booklets include:

- The Qurʼanic Foundations and Structure of Muslim Society in 2 volumes
- Islam and Christianity in the Modern World; Being an Exposition of the Qurʼanic view of Christianity in the Light of Modern Research
- Islam to the Modern Mind : Lectures in South Africa, 1970 & 1972
- Foundations of Faith : a Commonsense Exposition
- Through Science and Philosophy to Religion : Being a Treatise on the Necessity of Divine Revelation
- Islam versus Marxism; Being an Essay written for the Muslim - Christian convention held in Lebanon in 1954
