= Imran N. Hosein =

20th and 21st-century Islamic preacher

Imran Nazar Hosein
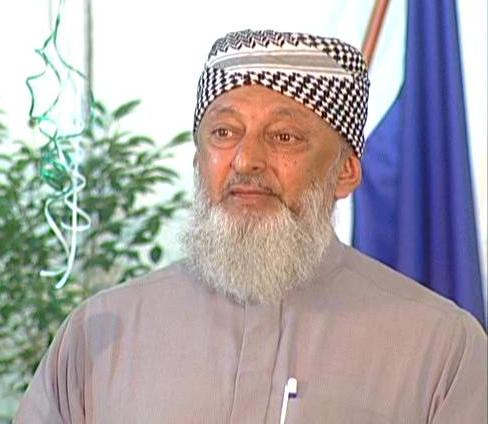
- Imran Hosein during an Eid lecture in 2005
- Title: Sheikh

Personal life
- Born: 1942 (age 83–84) Trinidad and Tobago
- Education: University of Karachi; University of the West Indies; Al-Azhar University; Graduate Institute of International Studies
- Occupation: Islamic preacher, author, philosopher, Ministry of Foreign Affairs of the Government of Trinidad and Tobago
- Website: imranhosein.org

Religious life
- Religion: Islam

Muslim leader
- Influenced by: Allama Iqbal; Muhammad Fazlur Rahman Ansari; Rumi; Israr Ahmed

YouTube information
- Channel: Sheikh Imran Hosein
- Years active: 2011–present
- Genre: Islamic eschatology
- Subscribers: 559 thousand
- Views: 74 million
- Last updated: 31 July 2026

Imran Nazar Hosein (born 1942) is a Trinidadian and Tobagonian Islamic preacher, author, and philosopher who specialises in Islamic eschatology, world politics, economics, and modern socio-economic/political issues. He is the author of Jerusalem in the Qur'an and other books.

== Background and education ==
Hosein was born into an Indo-Trinidadian family in Trinidad and Tobago. He studied Islam under the guidance of the Islamic scholar, Muhammad Fazlur Rahman Ansari at the Aleemiyah Institute of Islamic Studies, Karachi, Pakistan. He also pursued post-graduate studies in philosophy at Karachi University, and international relations at the University of West Indies, Trinidad, and the Graduate Institute of International Studies, Geneva, Switzerland. He led the Jumu'ah prayers and delivered the sermon at the United Nations headquarters in Manhattan once a month for ten years.

== Religious views ==
Hosein opposes sectarianism, stating, "I do not discuss sectarian issues. I firmly oppose sectarianism. I am not Brelvi – never was and never will be. I am not Deobandi – never was and never will be. I am not wahhabi [sic] – never was and never will be." He has, however, praised Sufi Shuyukh he calls authentic.

Regarding music, Hosein has stated: "Those kinds of music from the duff and similar drums (under the category of ma'azif) are unequivocally permissible... Further the use of the drums are unequivocally permissible for festivals and weddings and joyous times."

== Political views ==
Hosein opposes fiat currency, describing it as "bogus, fraudulent, haram and an amazingly dangerous instrument of oppression and universal slavery", although he states that "we are permitted to use it until such time as we can escape from its poisonous, deadly and sinful embrace" based on the Islamic principle of necessity. He proposes that fiat currency be removed "through the creation of micro-markets which use only Sunnah money and which are a part of remotely-located Muslim Villages".

Hosein opposes the feminist movement.

Hosein believes the persecution of Uyghurs in China is an invention of the CIA.

Hosein is a supporter of Venezuelan politician, revolutionary, and military officer Hugo Chávez.

== Opposition ==
Ebrahim Desai, who ran the website Askimam, claimed Hosein has deviant positions, such as rejecting certain hadith that are considered authentic by Sunnis and diverting from the consensus opinion. For example, he issued a fatwa discouraging Muslims from listening to his talks. A second fatwa by the same scholar said that due to his views some hadith of Sahih al-Bukhari are fabricated and Gog and Magog have already been released. Two other Islamic websites have published articles espousing similar views.

Hosein has been banned from speaking at Mucurapo Mosque and Singapore for being "too radical".

On 23 October 2025, Imran Hosein was denied entry into the Republic of Albania and turned back by the Albanian Police at Rinas International Airport.

== Literary works ==
- Hosein, Imran Nazar (2022). Islam and Hinduism In Ākhir Al-Zamān.
- Hosein, Imran Nazar (2021). Pakistan - The Way Forward.
- Hosein, Imran Nazar (2020). The Strategic Significance of Isra' and Mi'raj.
- Hosein, Imran Nazar (2020). The Qur'ān and The Moon.
- Hosein, Imran Nazar (2020). The Qur'an, the Great War, and the West. Amazon Digital Services LLC - KDP Print US. ISBN 978-1989450147.
- Hosein, Imran Nazar (2019). The Qur'an, Dajjal, and the Jassad. Amazon Digital Services LLC - KDP Print US. ISBN 978-1989450062.
- Hosein, Imran Nazar (2018). Constantinople In The Qur'an. ISBN 978-976-95837-4-0.
- Hosein, Imran Nazar (2017). Methodology for the Study of the Qur'an. ISBN 978-976-95837-1-9.
- Hosein, Imran Nazar (2017). Dajjal, the Qur'an, and Awwal Al-Zamaan: The Antichrist, The Holy Qur'an, and The Beginning of History. Amazon Digital Services LLC - KDP Print US. ISBN 978-1989450000.
- Hosein, Imran Nazar (2015). In Search of Khidr's Footprints In Ākhir Al-Zamān.
- Hosein, Imran Nazar (2014). The Qur'anic Method of Curing Alcoholism and Drug Addiction.
- Hosein, Imran Nazar (2012). Madinah Returns To Center-Stage In Hkhir Al-Zaman.
- Hosein, Imran Nazar (2011). The Islamic Travelogue.
- Hosein, Imran Nazar (2011). Explaining Israel's Mysterious Imperial Agenda and Other Essays On Israel.
- Hosein, Imran Nazar (2011). Fasting and Power: The Strategic Significance of the Fast of Ramandān.
- Hosein, Imran Nazar (2011). George Bernard Shaw and The Islamic Scholar.
- Hosein, Imran Nazar (2011). Iqbāl and Pakistan's Moment of Truth.
- Hosein, Imran Nazar (2011). Jerusalem in the Qur'an: An Islamic View of the Destiny of Jerusalem. Amazon Digital Services LLC - KDP Print US. ISBN 978-1989450079.
- Hosein, Imran Nazar (2009). An Islamic View of Gog and Magog in the Modern World. Amazon Digital Services LLC - KDP Print US. ISBN 978-1989450130.
- Hosein, Imran Nazar (2007). Signs of The Last Day In The Modern Age. ISBN 978-976-95837-7-1.
- Hosein, Imran Nazar (2007). Surah Al-Kahf and The Modern Age.
- Hosein, Imran Nazar (2007). Surah Al-Kahf Explanation and Commentary. ISBN 978-976-95838-0-1.
- Hosein, Imran Nazar (2007). The Gold Dinar and Silver Dirham: Islam and the Future of Money.
- Hosein, Imran Nazar (2002). A Muslim response to the attack on America.
- Hosein, Imran Nazar (2001). The Strategic Importance of Dreams and Visions in Islam. Amazon Digital Services LLC - KDP Print US. ISBN 978-1989450017.
- Hosein, Imran Nazar (2001). The Religion of Abraham and the State of Israel: A View from the Qur'an. Masjid Dar al-Qur'an. ISBN 978-9839541243.
- Hosein, Imran Nazar (1999). Islam and Buddhism in the Modern World. ISBN 978-976-95838-4-9.
- Hosein, Imran Nazar (1997). The importance of the prohibition of Riba in Islam. Masjid Dar al-Qur'an. ISBN 978-9839541182.
- Hosein, Imran Nazar (1997). One Jama'at One Ameer: The Organization of a Muslim Community in the Age of Fitan. Masjid Dar al-Qur'an. ISBN 978-9839541229.
- Hosein, Imran Nazar (1997). The Prohibition of Riba in the Quran and Sunnah. Masjid Dar al-Qur'an. ISBN 978-9839541236.
- Hosein, Imran Nazar (1996). The caliphate, the hejaz and the Saudi-Wahhabi nation-state. Independently Published. ISBN 979-8582319306.
- Hosein, Imran Nazar (1991). Islam and the Changing World Order. Muslim Converts' Association of Singapore. ISBN 9810028253.
