= Jamda, Mayurbhanj =

Jamda
- Village
- Jamda within Odisha, India Jamda within India Jamda within Asia
- Coordinates: 22°15′40″N 86°03′05″E
- Country: India
- State: Odisha
- District: Mayurbhanj
- Sub District: Jashipur

Population (2011)
  - Total: 2,356
- Time zone: UTC+05:30 (Indian Standard Time)

Jamda is a village and a block located in Odisha, India. Jamda is located in the Mayurbhanj district. The population of the village is 2,356. (as 2011)

== Jamda Block ==
Jamda Block consist of Jamda along with 65 other villages. Jamda is located in the vidhan Sabha constituency of Rairangpur. The block is one of 26 blocks in the Mayurbhanj district. The block has a population of 59,402 with 28,784 males and 30,618 females. The literacy rate of the block is 50%.

== Demographics ==
As of 2011, the village has a population of 2,356, with 1,063 males and 1,293 females. The village has a total of 540 houses. The village has a 59.61% literacy rate.

== Education ==
The village only has a primary school, Jamda Primary School but the village is not far from Tendra High School.
