= Telok Kurau =

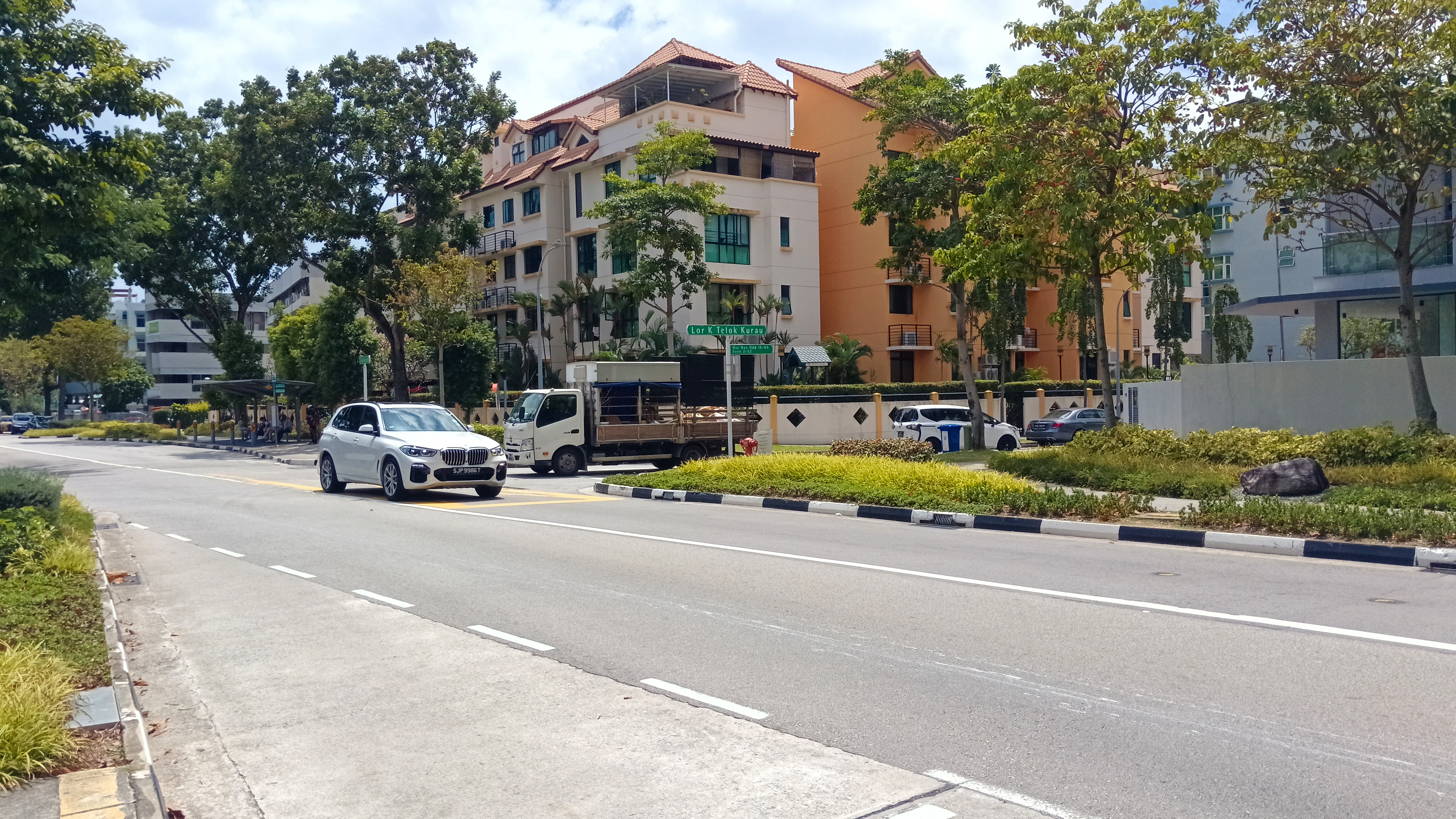
- The middle of Telok Kurau Road.
- Former name: Kampong Telok Kurau
- Owner: Land Transport Authority (LTA)
- Maintained by: LTA
- Nearest Mass Rapid Transit System station: Marine Terrace MRT station, Eunos MRT station

Telok Kurau is a residential enclave located along Telok Kurau Road in between Geylang and Katong in the East Region, Singapore. The road connects Changi Road to East Coast Road and Marine Parade Road. The residential enclave is primarily formed by terrace houses and private properties.

== Etymology and history ==
The name Telok Kurau means "Bay of Kurau." The word kurau is a Malay nickname given to the Indian threadfin, a species of marine ray-finned fish. Such fish would populate the waters around the eastern coasts in Singapore. Telok Kurau itself was originally a small village on the eastern coast. After 1980, it was gradually redeveloped into a modern residential enclave consisting mainly of terrace houses and private properties such as condominiums.

== Places of worship ==
=== Masjid Abdul Aleem Siddique ===
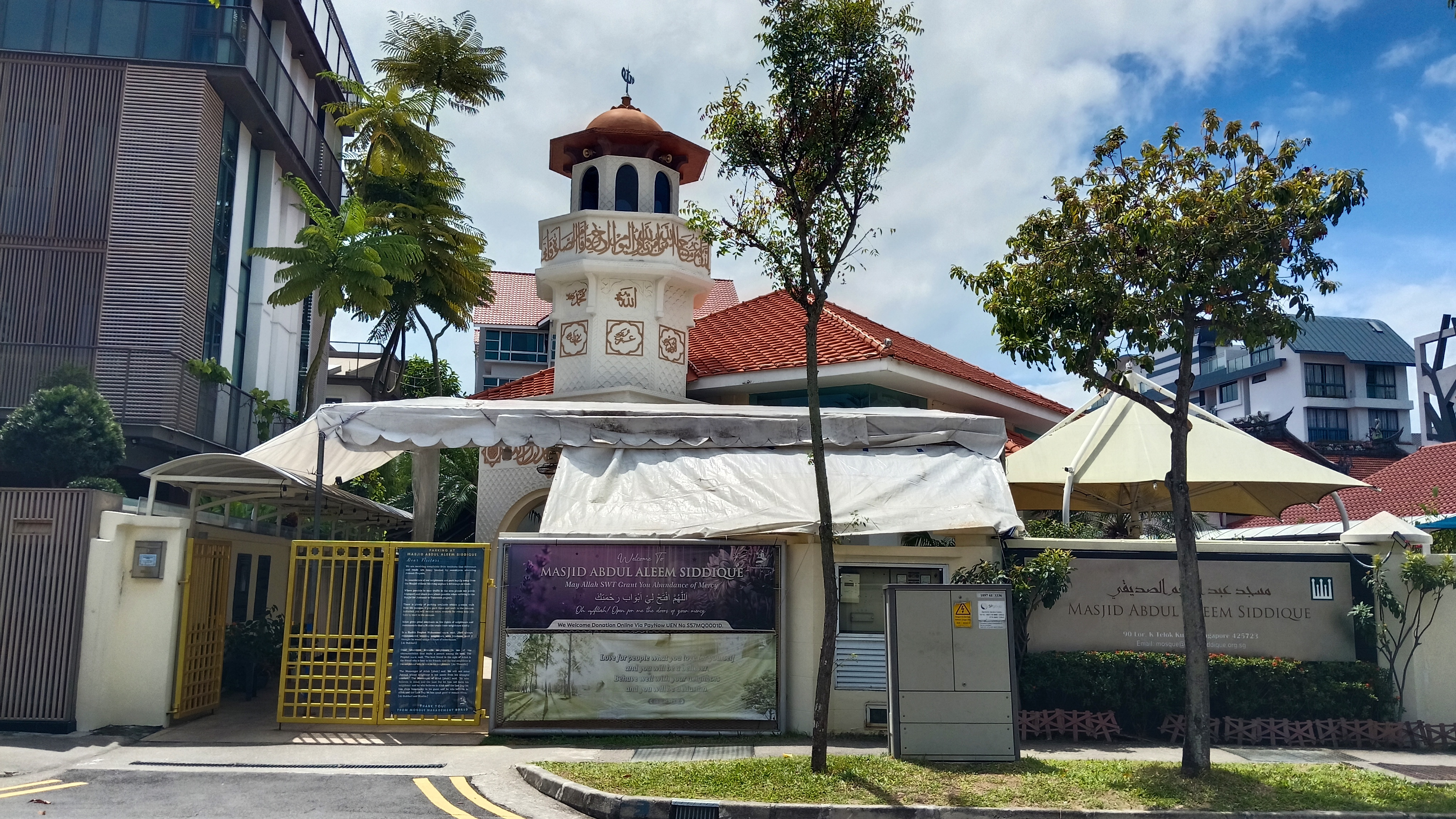
The sole mosque of Telok Kurau.

Built in 1957, the mosque is named for Muhammad Abdul Aleem Siddiqi, a missionary who propagated Islam in the Malay Peninsula, especially in Singapore. He was the founder of Jamiyah Singapore, a non-governmental and charitable Islamic organization.

== Schools ==
- Telok Kurau Primary School

== Transportation ==
The nearest MRT stations to Telok Kurau are Kembangan on the East–West Line and Marine Terrace on the Thomson–East Coast line.

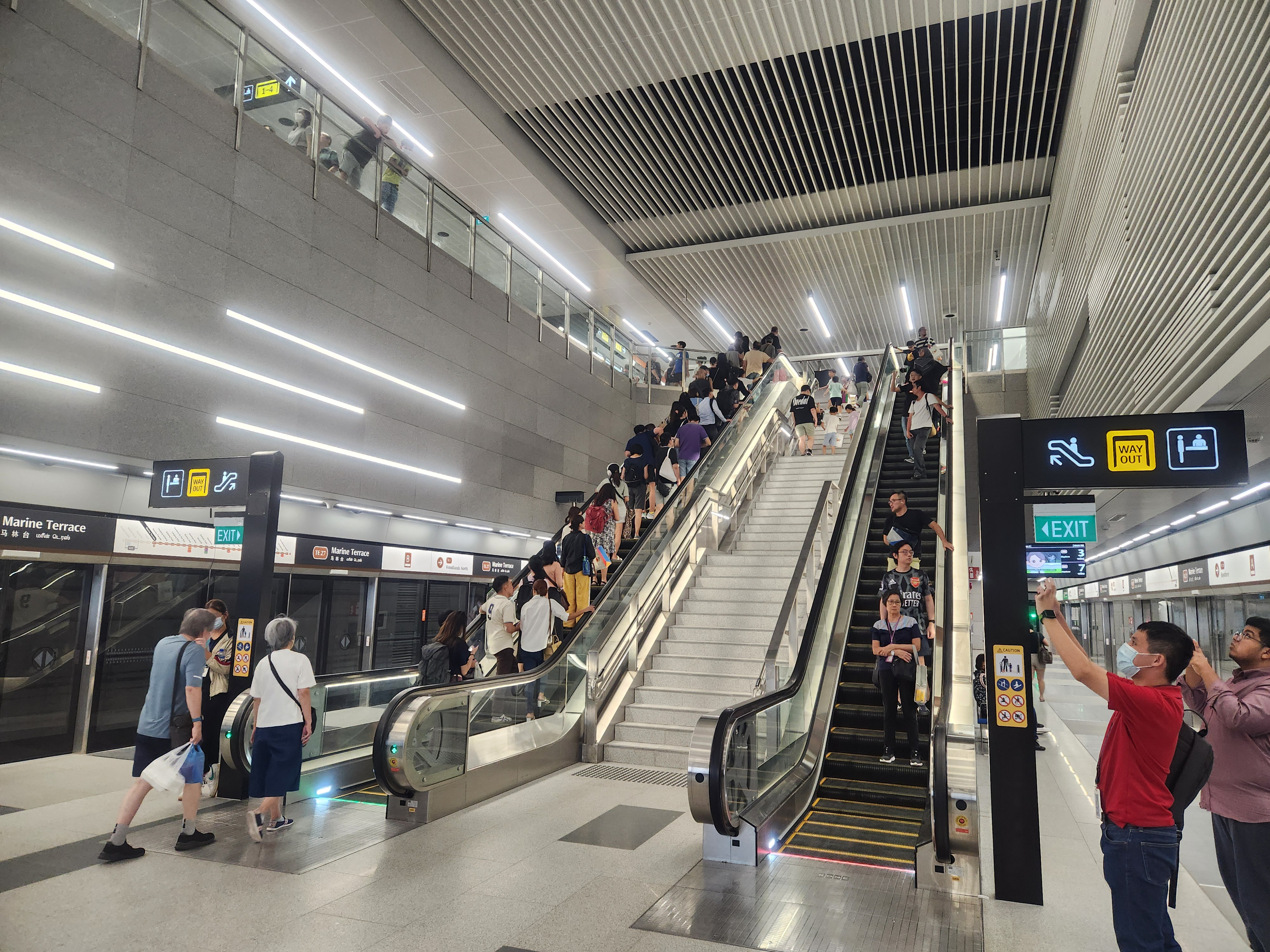
Marine Terrace MRT station had the alternative name "Telok Kurau."

In October 2015, a poll was held to determine the name of the then yet to be completed MRT station, TE27. One of the choices was "Telok Kurau" which eventually lost to "Marine Terrace."

== See also ==
- Katong
- Geylang
