= Masjid Jamiyah Ar-Rabitah =

Mosque at Tiong Bahru, Singapore

Masjid Jamiyah Ar-Rabitah مسجد جمعية الرابطة
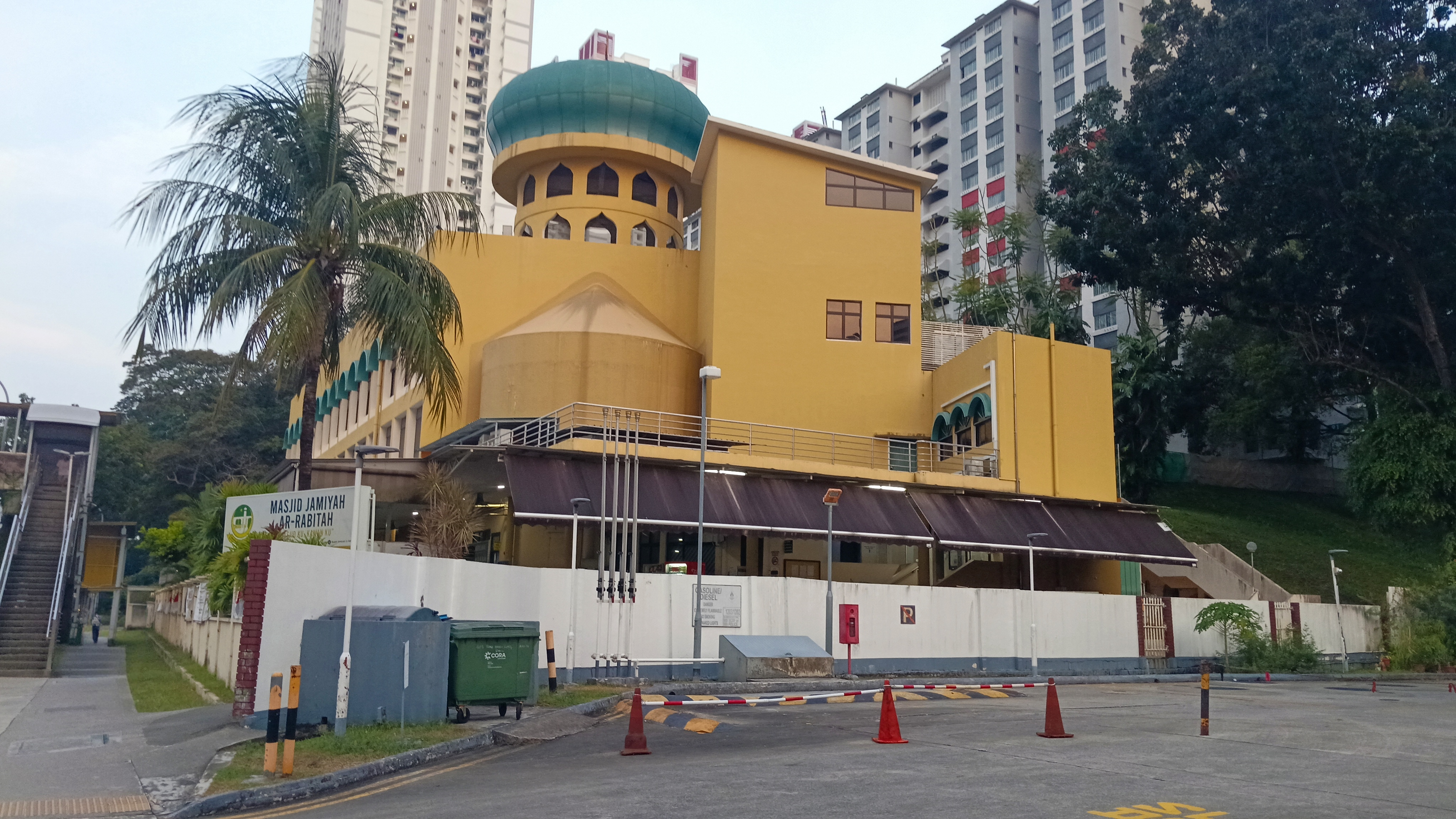

- Location in Singapore

Religion
- Affiliation: Sunni Islam

Location
- Location: 601 Tiong Bahru Road, Singapore 158787
- Country: Singapore
- Coordinates: 1.2883113°N 103.8202114°E

Architecture
- Architect: Yong Kok Choo
- Type: Mosque
- Style: Modernist architecture
- Completed: 1962 (Original); 1985 (Reconstruction)

Masjid Jamiyah Ar-Rabitah (Jawi: مسجد جمعية الرابطة) is a mosque located along Tiong Bahru Road in Bukit Merah, Singapore. Adjacent to the Redhill MRT station, the mosque was built in 1962 and later rebuilt in 1985 into its present day form.

== Etymology ==
The name of the mosque, Jamiyah Ar-Rabitah, is a combination of two Arabic words, taken from the names of two organizations, Jamiyah Singapore and the Muslim World League (known in the Arabic language as the Rābiṭah al-ʿĀlam al-ʾIslāmī). The mosque is named as such in honour of both of organizations as they had financed the construction of the original structure in 1959.

== History ==
The original mosque at the site was built in 1962 at a site along Tiong Bahru Road that was chosen in 1959. It was officially inaugurated in late 1964 under the name "Masjid Tiong Bahru" by Mohammed Khir Johari, who was the contemporary Malayan Minister for Agriculture and Co-Operatives in colonial Singapore. After the formation of the Majlis Ugama Islam Singapura (MUIS) in 1968, the mosque fell under their management and was also authorized as a place for the collection of Zakat al-Fitr payments. In 1982, the mosque was deemed too small and hence charitable sales of food and Islamic literature were held in order to fund an expansion project for the mosque. After the first stages for the project had been fully funded, the mosque was torn down and then rebuilt from the ground up with direction from architect Yong Kok Choo, who had designed a new three-storey building for the mosque. It was eventually reopened on 9 August 1985, coinciding with the National Day of Singapore, with Syed Isa Semait, Mufti of the country, present at the reopening ceremony of the mosque.

== Architecture ==
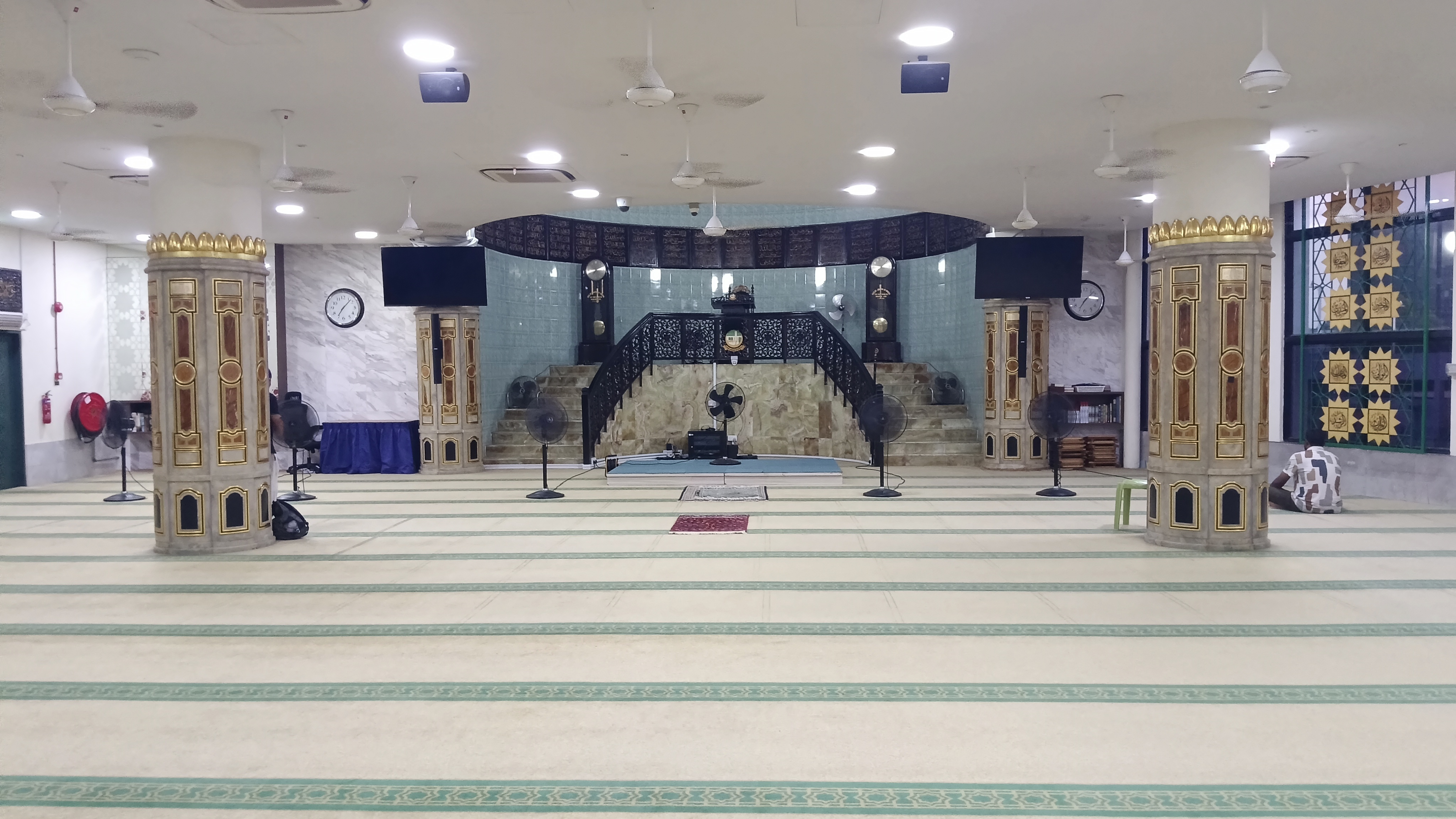
The main prayer hall of the mosque.

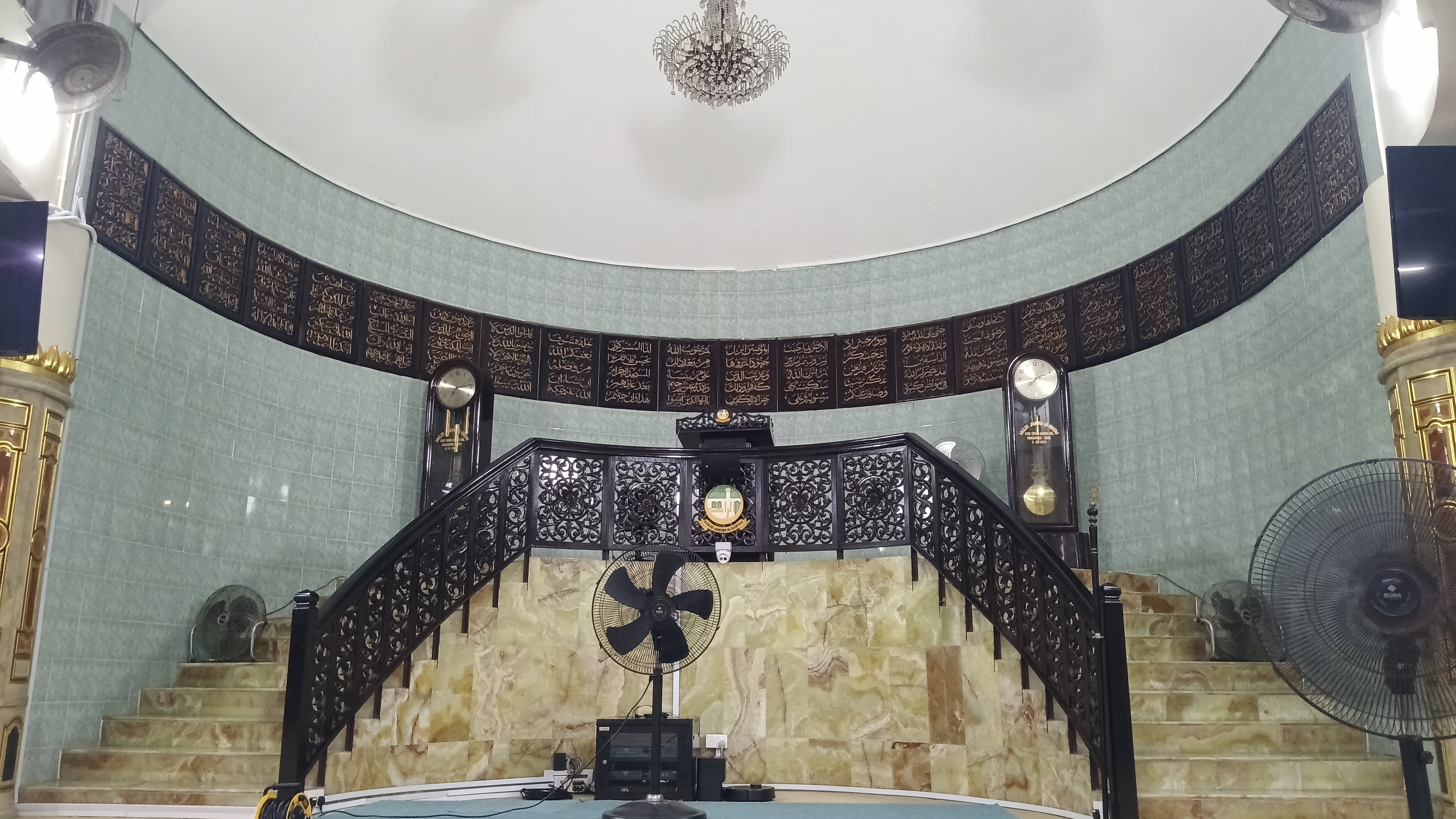
The mihrab of the mosque.

Masjid Jamiyah Ar-Rabitah is built in the style of modernist architecture, with the exterior of the building being simplistic in nature, with an onion dome on a cylindrical base that overlooks the large mihrab which itself encompasses the minbar. The main prayer hall of the mosque is situated on the second level and can accommodate a total of one thousand worshippers, while the madrasa on the third level can accommodate eight hundred students during Friday prayers. Administrative offices and a private carpark are situated on the first level, with the mosque having two entrances on the northern and southern side that lead into the street, with the northern one being a ramp for elderly and disabled people. In the eastern corner of the mosque, next to the carpark, is an elevator which was installed in 2011.

== Transportation ==
Masjid Jamiyah Ar-Rabitah is situated along Tiong Bahru Road and is accessible from the bus stops outside the mosque or from the Redhill MRT station which is within walking distance from the mosque.

== See also ==
- List of mosques in Singapore
