= Muhammad Abdul Aleem Siddiqi =

Pakistani Islamic scholar, spiritual master

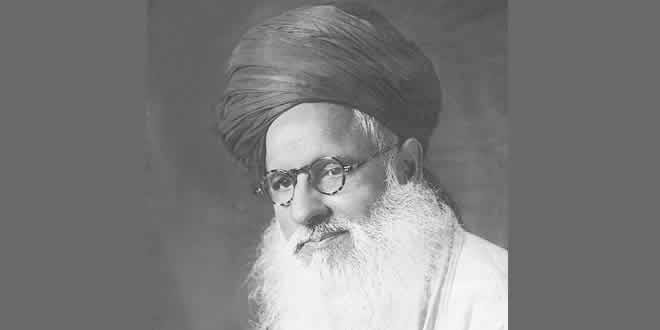

Personal life
- Born: 3 April 1892 Meerut, North-Western Provinces, India
- Died: 22 August 1954 (aged 62) Medina, Saudi Arabia
- Main interest(s): Missionary, Islamic revivalism, comparative religion
- Notable idea(s): Islam, Interfaith dialogue
- Known for: Preaching of Islam
- Relatives: Son: Shah Ahmad Noorani
- Website: wfim.org.pk/abdul-aleem-siddiqui/

Religious life
- Religion: Islam
- Denomination: Sunni
- Founder of: Darul Uloom Alimia Jamda Shahi, Basti
- Jurisprudence: Hanafi
- Creed: Maturidi
- Movement: Barelvi

Muslim leader
- Teacher: Ahmed Raza Khan Barelvi
- Influenced by: Abu Hanifa Moinuddin Chishti Ahmed Raza Khan Barelvi Hassan Raza Khan Mustafa Raza Khan Qadri
- Influenced: Muhammad Fazlur Rahman Ansari, Shah Ahmad Noorani, Ahmed Deedat

Muhammad Abdul Aleem Siddiqi Al-Qaderi Meeruti (3 April 1892 – 22 August 1954) also known as Muballigh-e-Islam was an Islamic scholar, spiritual master, author and preacher from Pakistan who belonged to the Barelvi movement of Sunni Islam. He was a student of Ahmed Raza Khan Barelvi. He was the leader of the All Malaya Muslim Missionary Society, Singapore (now known as Jamiyah Singapore). Despite being a great preacher of Islam he was scholar of comparative religion.

== Life ==
Maulana Abdul Aleem Siddiqi was born on 3 April 1892 in Meerut and was descendant of HazratAbu Bakr Siddique. It is said that he had memorized the Quran by the age of four, and obtained a degree in Islamic theology at the age of 16. He learned the natural and social sciences.

=== Ba’at and Khilafat ===
He became a mureed of Imam Ahmed Raza Khan Barelvi in the Qadiriyya Razviya order and got his khilafat.

== Missionary activities ==
Siddique traveled extensively overseas for 40 years to preach and propagate Islam. He advocated inter-religious harmony and spread message of peace and came to seem by some people as a Roving Ambassador of Peace.

In 1930 he went to Singapore as a missionary. In 1932 he took the lead in establishing the All-Malaya Muslim Missionary Society (now known as Jamiyah Singapore). This society had branches all over the Malaya. The All-Malaya Muslim Missionary Society (now known as Jamiyah Singapore) named the Masjid Abdul Aleem Siddique after him. In early 1949, he founded the Inter-Religious Organization of Singapore and Johor Bahru with the total support of the British Colonial Government and leaders of the Hindu, Jewish, Zoroastrian (Parsi), Christian, Sikh, Buddhist and Muslim leaders from Singapore and Johor Bahru. The then president of Jamiyah Singapore, Syed Ibrahim Omar Alsagoff, who was already active in inter faith work assisted him by garnering the support and cooperation of the other religious leaders or representatives.

He visited Trinidad in 1950 and launched World Islamic Mission (WIM) at Port of Spain Jama Mosque.

In 1926, he founded, the Muslim Association of the Philippines (MUSAPHIL) which became an influential organization in Philippines. In the early 1950s, his visit to Manila encouraged some Muslims to revive the madrasah system of education.

His disciple and son-in-law Muhammad Fazlur Rahman Ansari was also a scholar, who established Aleemiyah Institute of Islamic Studies, an English-medium institution of Islamic theology, named after Abdul Aleem Siddiqui, in Karachi, Pakistan.

== Politics ==
A supporter of the Pakistan Movement and a friend of Jinnah, at partition his family relocated there where his son, Shah Ahmad Noorani, became a political figure and at one time was head of the opposition in Pakistan's parliament .

He led Pakistan's first Eid prayer.

== Books and booklets ==
Some of his works include:

- Elementary teachings of Islam
- The principles of Islam
- A Shavian and a theologian : an illuminating conversation between George Bernard Shaw, the sceptic, and Mohammed Abdul Aleem Siddiqui, al-Qaderi, the spiritualist at Mombasa, Kenya
- The forgotten path of knowledge
- The history of the codification of Islamic law : being an illuminating exposition of the conformist view-point accepted by the overwhelming majority of the Islamic world
