= Jamiat Ulema-e-Pakistan =

List of Political Parties of Pakistan as of 2023

Jamiat Ulema-e-Pakistan (JUP) جميعت علماءِ پاکستان
- Abbreviation: JUP
- President: Pir Ijaz Hashmi (JUP-IN); Sahibzada Abul Khair Muhammad Zubair (JUP-N)
- Chairman: Shah Anas Noorani (JUP-IN)
- General Secretary: Shah Owais Noorani (JUP-IN)
- Historical leaders: Maulana Abdul Ghafoor Hazarvi; Abdul Hamid Qadri Badayuni; Khwaja Qamar ul Din Sialvi; Syed Faiz-ul Hassan Shah; Abdul Sattar Khan Niazi; Shah Ahmad Noorani Siddiqi; Muhammad Fazal Karim
- Founded: March 28, 1948; 78 years ago
- Student wing: Anjuman Talaba-e-Islam
- Religion: Sunni Islam specifically, Barelvi
- National affiliation: MMA; PDM
- Colors: Green
- Factions: Jamiat Ulema-e-Pakistan - Imam Noorani (JUP-IN); Jamiat Ulema-e-Pakistan - Noorani (JUP-N)
- Senate: 0 / 100
- National Assembly: 0 / 366

Election symbol
- Key (JUP-N); Chitrali cap (JUP-IN)
- Politics of Pakistan; Political parties; Elections; Although, there are many of the small factions of JUP but the two larger factions are currently headed by Shah Owais Noorani, son of former JUP leader late Shah Ahmed Noorani, and the other by Sahibzada Abul Khair Muhammad Zubair namely Jamiat Ulema-e-Pakistan (Imam Noorani) and Jamiat Ulema-e-Pakistan (Noorani) respectively.

Jamiat Ulema-e-Pakistan (JUP) (Urdu: جميعت علماءِ پاکستان) is an Islamist political party in Pakistan. It was founded in 1948 by leaders of All India Sunni Conference.

The JUP exercised considerable political influence in Pakistani politics during the 1970s to 2003. Its students' wing Anjuman Talaba-e-Islam has a following in Sunni institutions across the country.

The party is considered a moderate force in the country.

== History ==
It was established on 28 March 1948 in Multan by the leaders of All India Sunni Conference to present Sunni Sufi representation in the Islamic Republic of Pakistan. It had a major support base in Sindh and Punjab.

JUP supported Ayub Khan's regime during the 1965 presidential elections on the promises of getting a Shariah-based Pakistan.

In the 1970 elections, the JUP won seven seats in Sindh under the leadership of Maulana Ahmad Shah Noorani; the party did not join General Zia Ul Haq government due to Salafi-Saudi inclination of the Zia regime. The party was opposed to Zia's military rule for two reasons. First was its pro-democracy stand and second because of Zia's support of Deobandi-Wahhabi Islam promoted by Saudi Arabia.

== Ideology ==
JUP was established for the implementation of the Quran and Sunnah in the newly formed Islamic Republic of Pakistan. The party advocated the establishment of Islamic system of Prophet's Sunnah (Nizam-e-Mustafa) Shariat Courts and passing of law of blasphemy and played a role in declaring Ahmadis as non-Muslims. In 1974 a bill was passed in the parliament to declare Ahmadis as non-Muslims through the efforts of JUP President Shah Ahmad Noorani. JUP through its leaders inserted the definition of Muslim and argued that the Finality of Prophethood to be included in this definition.

It opposed the US-led attack in Afghanistan after 9/11 but supported combating the Taliban and extremist ideologies in the Swat region of Pakistan.

== Present ==
The party was mostly active from 1970s to 2003 as independent political party and having a role in mainstream politics and significance as well. Clashes over party decisions have divided the JUP into factions, and since 1986 the JUP has lost much of its support. The two main factions are headed by Shah Ahmad Noorani and Abdus Sattar Niazi. After the death of Noorani, one faction is led by Shah Owais Noorani, son of former president late Shah Ahmed Noorani, and the other by Sahibzada Abul Khair Muhammad Zubair, a former MNA of Hyderabad.

On 20 September 2020, JUP founded Pakistan Democratic Movement along with ten other parties. On 20 September 2020, JAH's Ameer Sajid Mir attended the All Parties Conference (APC). At the APC, eleven parties started the Pakistan Democratic Movement (PDM) which was made to remove military establishment of Pakistan from politics. JUP also came for PDM's public gatherings and power-shows.

== Political Positions ==
The Jamiat Ulema e Pakistan is widely considered an islamist, religious conservatism party. It advocates for Nizam-E-Mustafa, an Islamic system of government that began in 1977 as a movement created in opposition of the secular and socialist government of Zulfiqar Ali Bhutto.

=== Ahmedi issue ===
After the 1974 Anti-Ahmadiyya riots, public perception and tensions continued to grow against the Ahmadiyya community. On 30 June 1974, JUP President Shah Ahmad Noorani came before the Parliament of Pakistan to push forward a resolution signed by 37 MNAs that called upon the declaration of Ahmadis as non-Muslims. After much deliberation, the bill was passed under pressure.
