= Jamda Shahi =

- Location in Uttar Pradesh, India Jamda Shahi (India)
- Coordinates: 26.901491°N 82.780588°E
- Country: India
- State: Uttar Pradesh
- District: Basti
- Block: Sau Ghat

Languages
  - Official: Hindi
  - Local: Urdu
  - Literacy: 69.69%
  - Sex ratio: 959
- Time zone: UTC+5:30 (IST)
- PIN: 272002

Jamda Shahi is a village in Uttar Pradesh state of India. It is located in the Sau Ghat block of Basti district. The villages under the administration of Jamda Shahi gram panchayat include Jamda Shahi itself and Katesar.

The village is home to the Darul Uloom Alimia Jamda Shahi, a famous Islamic seminary in India, which has 1500 students as of 2014.

== Demographics ==
The religious groups in Jamda Shahi are:

Muslim	97.6%
Hindu	3.3%
Banjara	0.1%
