= Salahuddin (Hyderabad politician) =

Member of the National Assembly of Pakistan
- In office 13 August 2018 – 10 August 2023
- Constituency: NA-227 (Hyderabad-III)
- In office 2008–2013
- Constituency: NA-220 (Hyderabad-II)

Personal details
- Party: MQM-P (2018-present)
- Other political affiliations: MQM-L (2008-2013)

Salahuddin is a Pakistani politician who had been a member of the National Assembly of Pakistan from Hyderabad from August 2018 till August 2023. Previously he was a member of the National Assembly from 2008 to 2013.

== Political career ==
He was elected to the National Assembly of Pakistan from Constituency NA-220 (Hyderabad-II) as a candidate of Muttahida Qaumi Movement (MQM) in the 2008 Pakistani general election. He received 147,040 votes and defeated Irfan Qureshi, a candidate of Pakistan Peoples Party (PPP).

He was re-elected to the National Assembly as a candidate of MQM from Constituency NA-227 (Hyderabad-III) in the 2018 Pakistani general election.
