= Unbreakable (2025 film) =

2025 Indian documentary film

- Directed by: Vinay Shukla
- Starring: Arvind Kejriwal; Bhagwant Mann; Manish Sisodia; Saurabh Bhardwaj; Sandeep Pathak; Sanjay Singh; Satyendra Kumar Jain
- Release date: 19 January 2025
- Running time: 28 minutes
- Country: India
- Languages: Hindi; English

Unbreakable is a 2025 Indian Hindi-language socio-political documentary about the Aam Aadmi Party (AAP). It covers the arrest of party leader Arvind Kejriwal and other key members during the 2024 Indian general election. The 30-minute film includes interviews with prominent AAP figures such as Arvind Kejriwal, Atishi Marlena, Bhagwant Mann, Sandeep Pathak, Saurabh Bhardwaj, Manish Sisodia, Raghav Chadha, Satyendra Kumar Jain, Sanjay Singh and Jasmine Shah.

The documentary was originally set to be screened for the media in Delhi, but the event was stopped by the Delhi Police, who cited a lack of required permissions. AAP leaders, including Kejriwal, accused the Bharatiya Janata Party (BJP) of obstructing the screening.

Later, on 19 January 2025, YouTuber Dhruv Rathee released the documentary on his YouTube channel, which gained considerable attention.

== Censorship in Delhi ==
The Delhi Police halted the screening of the documentary, stating that the necessary permissions were not obtained. The event, intended as a private screening for journalists, was clarified by AAP leader Arvind Kejriwal as not being part of an election campaign, as there were no election-related materials or propaganda.

The police argued that the screening violated election guidelines, explaining that political events require approval through a single-window system at the District Election Officer's (DEO) office. They also stated that they could neither grant nor reject permission, as this process must be followed during the election period.

Kejriwal criticized the police action, alleging that the Bharatiya Janata Party (BJP) influenced the authorities to block the screening. He claimed the BJP was concerned about the film's content, which covers the arrest of AAP leaders and points to alleged unlawful actions by the BJP government.

According to AAP sources, theatre owners in Delhi were reportedly threatened with consequences if they screened the documentary. Despite the setback, Kejriwal expressed hope that permission would eventually be granted for the screening.
