= Attack on Arvind Kejriwal's residence =

2022 incident in Delhi, India

- Location: 28.6835°N 77.2212°E; Civil Lines, Delhi, India
- Date: 30 March 2022 c. 11:30 am (IST)
- Target: Residence of Arvind Kejriwal
- Assailant: Bharatiya Janata Party members
- Defender: Delhi Police
- Inquiry: Ongoing
- Litigation: Ongoing

On 30 March 2022, the official residence of Arvind Kejriwal, Chief Minister of Delhi, was allegedly attacked by members of the Bharatiya Janata Party (BJP). Deputy CM Manish Sisodia called the incident a conspiracy to murder Kejriwal. Tejasvi Surya, the national president of Bharatiya Janata Yuva Morcha (BJYM; the youth wing of the BJP) and a member of the Lok Sabha, had led a protest against Arvind Kejriwal with around 200 BJYM members. Several protesters were seen in CCTV footage breaking barriers in front of Kejriwal's residence and daubing red paint on the main gate. According to Delhi Police officials, the attackers also damaged a CCTV camera. Kejriwal's party, the Aam Aadmi Party (AAP), stated that he was not in the house at the time of the attack, but members of his family were present.

Saurabh Bhardwaj, an AAP member of the Delhi Legislative Assembly, filed a petition in the Delhi High Court seeking the formation of a special investigation team to carry out a "fair and time-bound investigation" into the incident. The petition asserted that the attack and vandalization appeared to have been carried out with the "tacit complicity" of Delhi police, and asked the court to issue directions to the Delhi Police and the Union Ministry of Home Affairs for ensuring the security of the chief minister and his residence. The court noted that the security was inadequate to control the crowd, and sought a status report of the police investigation into the incident within two weeks' time.

Delhi Police arrested eight members of BJYM in connection with the incident. A local court remanded all the arrested men into judicial custody. According to the police, all the 20 accused identified were BJYM members.

== Incident ==
An office bearer of Bharatiya Janata Party (BJP) had applied for a permission from the police to hold a protest. The application was rejected by the Arrangements cell of North district police. Despite not having the permission, the group proceeded with their plans.

Bharatiya Janata Yuva Morcha (BJYM, the youth wing of BJP) national president and Lok Sabha Member of Parliament Tejaswi Surya had led a protest against Arvind Kejriwal. Around 200 members of BJYM had gathered outside the Chief Minister's house. Some of them including Surya, reached the main gate of the residence. Several of these protesters were seen in the CCTV video, breaking the barriers and vandalising the main gate of the residence of Delhi Chief Minister. According to Delhi Police officials, the attackers also damaged a CCTV camera. According to Aam Aadmi Party leaders, Kejriwal was not in the house at the time of the attack but his family members were present.

Lok Sabha MP Tejasvi Surya was seen in the video from the incident, protesting outside the CM's residence along with BJYM members. Speaking about Surya’s involvement, a senior police officer had said, "We have footage where he is seen with protesters who later indulge in vandalism."

== Statements ==
Deputy Chief Minister Manish Sisodia said:

What happened this morning was a well-planned conspiracy to kill Arvind Kejriwal. The BJP is frustrated over its Punjab debacle. It cannot take on Arvind Kejriwal electorally and is now attempting to murder him. Today morning BJP goons reached Delhi CM’s doorstep, destroyed CCTV cameras, broke security and boom barriers outside Kejriwal ji’s residence all in the presence of police. BJP goons kept vandalising CM Arvind Kejriwal’s house... Instead of stopping them, the BJP police brought them to the door of the house.

Kejriwal discussing the incident said, "Kejriwal is not important... I am a simple aam aadmi. I am ready to sacrifice my life for the greater good of the country if it helps. But I strongly believe that such hooliganism will not aid in the growth of our motherland." "India has wasted 75 years in cheap politics of hatred and violence". "What does it say about our country and our politics if the biggest party of India, the one which rules our union, acts like this? What will the youth think about their leaders? They will think this is the right way and they should adopt it too. This would only hinder the path of our development"

Punjab Chief Minister Bhagwant Mann condemned the attack and claimed the BJP was showing signs of desperation after the formation of an AAP government in Punjab.

=== Police ===
On 30 March, North Delhi Police DCP, Sagar Singh Kalsi described the events and said, "Today 11.30 am onwards, a dharna was started by around 150-200 protestors of Bharatiya Janata Yuva Morcha (BJYM) outside the CM’s residence. Around 1 pm, some of the protesters breached two barricades and reached outside CM's house where they created a ruckus, shouted slogans", According to Kalsi, they were carrying a box of paint and threw the paint at the door, they broke the boom barrier arm and a CCTV camera. Kalsi added that the police team had detained around 70 people from the location.

A Delhi Police statement released separately also noted the use of water cannons to stop the protesters and that some of the BJYM members reached the CM residence and vandalised the gates. The Police said they were pursuing the criminal case against those involved.

== Petition in Delhi High Court ==
AAP MLA Saurabh Bhardwaj filed a petition in the Delhi High Court (HC) seeking the formation of a Special Investigation Team (SIT) for investigation in the incident. He petitioned that the attack and vandalism appeared to have been carried out with the "tacit complicity" of Delhi police. The petition said, "On March 30, 2022, several BJP goons, in the garb of a protest, launched an attack on the official residence of the Delhi CM". The petition referred to the videos and photographs that showed them walking through Delhi police's security cordon. The video showed that they had kicked and broken the boom barrier, broken the CCTVs cameras with cane, and painted the gate of the CM's residence. They were seen attempting to climb over the gate in the supervision of Delhi police personnel, who failed to stop them.

The petition called the violence directed towards the CM and his family as "especially egregious" and "meant to subdue, by the use of force, the highest elected official in NCT of Delhi and therefore the elected Government of Delhi. This was a direct attack on democracy."

On 22 August 2017, the Delhi HC directed the Delhi Police to prevent protests in front of the chief minister's house, as it is on a residential road. The petition noted that the inaction of Delhi Police in this incident, was a violation of the 2017 order. The petition noted, "It thus appears that Delhi Police was hand in glove with the goons as the goons are members of the ruling party in the Central Government, which has absolute control over the Delhi Police through the Ministry of Home Affairs." The petition reminded the court about a past incident on 10 December 2020, when there was an attack on the residence of the Deputy Chief Minister. The petition noted that during the 2020 incident the Delhi Police had failed to take the steps to stop the attack and later did not take concrete criminal action against the attackers.

The petition asked the court to issue direction to the Delhi Police and the Union Ministry of Home Affairs for ensuring the security of the Chief Minister and his residence.

=== HC response ===
After watching the video of the incident, the Delhi HC noted that the security was not adequate to control the crowd, and sought a status report of the police investigation into the incident. It said,

"It was an unruly crowd. We have seen the video. Some people tried to climb over the gate. They did not succeed. Probably it was not their intent also. Some of those in crowd have taken law-and-order into their hand. And there’s definitely an element of fear which has been sought to be created, that is evident. The police force was probably inadequate, you'll have to answer that. At least those who were there, they were trying to prevent it. Probably they were outnumbered. You’ll have to explain what kind of intimation you had and what kind of threat perception was there about this kind of incident taking place."

The court gave two weeks time to the police to submit an investigation report.

== Investigation ==
Delhi police registered a criminal case under relevant sections of the Indian Penal Code namely, sections 186 (obstructing public servant in discharge of public functions), 188 (disobedience to order duly promulgated by public servant), 353 (assault or criminal force to deter public servant from discharge of his duty) and 332 (voluntarily causing hurt to deter public servant from his duty) and section 3 of the Prevention of Damage to Public Property Act. Police had formed teams to find and arrest others.

On 31 March 2022, eight people from BJP's youth wing, who were involved in the incident were arrested. Delhi Police DCP, Sagar Singh Kalsi said, "We have arrested eight persons so far. All were sent to judicial custody by the court. We identified some from the footage. Around 20 persons have been identified and teams have been sent for raids." Police had arrested Chandrakant (27), Pradeep Tiwari (27), Raju Singh (28), Jitender Bisht (40), Naveen Kumar (38), Bablu Kumar (35), Neeraj Dixit (25) and Sunny (21) based on the CCTV video and technical evidence from the incident location. A local court remanded all the arrested men into judicial custody.

According to a senior police officer, all the accused were members of BJYM and residents of Delhi. Tejasvi Surya was questioned by the police on his role in the incident.
