= 2022 Delhi liquor policy case =

Political scandal in Delhi, India

The 2022 Delhi liquor policy case is an alleged political scandal concerning the Delhi Government, related with the introduction of Delhi's Excise Policy from 2021 to 2022. This policy allegedly intended to bring in private firms and enterprise companies into the retail liquor sectors. The allegations involve favouring the owners and shareholders of private sectors, waivers and reduction of license fee and creation of numerous licenses to all the new incoming enterprises, and bribery.

The matter was a major bone of contention between Aam Aadmi Party (AAP) and Bhartiya Janata Party (BJP) and continues to remain so. While the BJP has been calling this a glaring example of AAP's corruption, AAP has been calling it a falsely cooked political vendetta and an example of misuse of Central agencies like Central Bureau of Investigation (CBI) and Enforcement Directorate (ED). The matter is still ongoing in different ways at different forums.

== Background ==
In February 2021, a Group of Ministers led by Deputy Chief Minister Manish Sisodia and Health Minister Satyendra Kumar Jain was formed to look into reforms to the Delhi excise policy, which constituted a committee of experts. Sisodia, who also held the Excise portfolio brought in the Delhi's Excise Policy (2021–22). This bill aimed to privatise the sale of liquor in Delhi and cease government involvement in the sale of alcohol. The bill invited private enterprises to enter the field of liquor business, with an aim to boost up the excise department revenue by over a large percentage. It allegedly tried to end government ownership of liquor stores, which was replaced by the issuance of store operation licenses given to private companies. It also proposed an increase in the annual license fee from Rs. 8 lakh to 75 lakh. Areas of Delhi were categorized into 32 zones which further included 8–10 wards, each of which would have around 27 outlets. This meant every municipal ward had 2–3 liquor vendors operating in the area.

The government claimed that this would eliminate the liquor mafia, and enhance consumer experiences visiting new outlets. The private liquor shops were allowed to provide discounts on MRP to attract customers, and were also given provision to deliver liquor until 3 AM. This bill was sent to the Lieutenant Governor's sign and approval, which was passed by the governor with certain conditions on unauthorized areas set.

== Corruption allegations ==
After the policy's implementation, there were a batch of complaints alleging a “multi-crore scam” in the policy, one of which was filed with the Delhi Police in June 2022 by former Delhi Congress president Chaudhary Anil Kumar. The bill faced severe backlash from the opposition BJP and Congress, stating that the government has sold all the licenses in exchange for money and accused that the government has handed over the Excise department fully to private players and business agencies. The liquor license holders were allegedly given extensions according to their own will. The opposition also accused that the new policies contradicted the excise policies, and businessmen were given an exemption of 30 crores, as per their will. Both the parties also sought intervention from central agencies to investigate the same. "

In July 2022, the then Chief Secretary of Delhi, Naresh Kumar, reported procedural violations in the formation of the liquor policy to Saxena, who recommended a CBI probe. These alleged violations were the ignoring of the recommendations of the expert committee and the bypassing of the Lieutenant Governor when implementing the policy. This report alleged losses to the exchequer of up to 580 crore. Another investigation by ED alleged that the liquor policy would give liquor wholesalers a guaranteed 12% profit margin in exchange for a 6% kickback paid to AAP ministers. The ED alleged that Jain and Sisodia overruled the decisions of the expert committee and bypassed the Lieutenant Governor in tweaking the policy to include this profit margin, which they alleged was never discussed during the meetings of the Group of Ministers but was instead agreed on as a "collective decision" of the Delhi cabinet. It was further alleged that Vijay Nair, the AAP's communication in charge who was closely interacting with Sisodia about the liquor policy, was paid 100 crore in advance kickback by a "South Group", consisting of Hyderabad-based private entities. Some of the members of this alleged "South group" included former Telangana Chief Minister's K. Chandrashekhar Rao's daughter K. Kavitha and then-Ongole Lok Sabha MP Magunta Sreenivasulu Reddy from ruling YSRCP party in Andhra Pradesh, along with many Hyderabad-based businessmen. In exchange Nair allegedly granted this "South group", which had no foothold in the Delhi liquor business at the time, wholesale licenses and retail license above and beyond the policy's allowance, as well as other "undue favours".

Meanwhile BJP released a "sting operation" video, where father of an FIR accused Sunny Marwah collected money stating it as "excise duty" under the new policy. The BJP IT-cell head Amit Malviya released the video, and voiced large corruption and bribery by officials, and pitched in concerns that the state suffered with middlemen and mafias in the government.

Delhi Lt Governor V K Saxena had played an important role in the process of initiation of various enquiries and investigations. This had led to skirmishes between AAP and Saxena, with AAP hurling various various allegations against Saxena with Saxena calling them "baseless" and "deliberately misleading", while sending legal notice to AAP leaders.

== Initial Timeline ==
2021: Introduction of the excise policy

- February 2021: Group of Ministers led by Deputy CM Manish Sisodia and Health Minister Satyendra Kumar Jain organised to look into excise policy reforms
- 17 November 2021: Delhi government implements new liquor policy giving control over wholesale and retail sectors to private entities

2022: Allegations and investigations begin

- 8 July: Chief Secretary of Delhi, Naresh Kumar, submits report to Lieutenant Governor on alleged irregularities in the formulations of the excise policy
- 22 July: Lieutenant Governor recommends CBI probe into formulation of excise policy
- 19 August: CBI files FIR against 15 people, including Sisodia, in formulation of excise policy
- 20 August: CBI conducts raids on Sisodia's residences
- 22 August: ED registers separate related money laundering case
- 1 September: Delhi government repeals 2021-2022 excise policy, reverts to old model of government ownership of wholesale and retail
- 6 September: ED conducts raids in 40 locations across the country, Sisodia's properties are not included
- 25 November: ED files chargesheet against seven accused, alcohol businessmen and Delhi government officials
- 21 December: ED includes BRS MLC K. Kavitha in accused in chargesheet

2023: Arrests and escalation

- 7 January: ED includes Aurobindo Pharma owner Sharath Chandra Reddy and Abhishek Boinpally in supplementary chargesheet
- 26 February: CBI arrests Sisodia after eight hours of questioning
- 1 May: ED files new chargesheet against Kavitha and her husband, accusing them of using illegal funds to purchase land for cheap prices

2024: Arrest and resignation of Arvind Kejriwal

- 21 March: Arvind Kejriwal was arrested by ED after a request for protection was refused by Delhi High Court.
- 13 September: Arvind Kejriwal granted bail by Supreme Court with certain conditions.
- 17 September: Arvind Kejriwal resigned as Delhi Chief Minister.

== Subsequent Developments ==
On February 26, 2026, the Rouse Avenue Court discharged Kejriwal along with others in this case, noting the accusations were not supported by sufficient material. The Court discharged all 23 accused persons in the matter. They are Kuldeep Singh, Narender Singh, Vijay Nair, Abhishek Boinpally, Arun Pillai, Mootha Gautam, Sameer Mahendru, Manish Sisodia, Amandeep Singh Dhall, Arjun Pandey, Butchibabu Gorantla, Rajesh Joshi, Damodar Prasad Sharma, Prince Kumar, Arvind Kumar Singh, Chanpreet Singh, K Kavitha, Arvind Kejriwal, Durgesh Pathak, Amit Arora, Vinod Chauhan, Ashish Chand Mathur and Sarath Reddy. The Court said that the CBI failed to make out a prima facie case against the accused. It said Kejriwal was implicated without any cogent material. While pronouncing the verdict, the Court said that the CBI chargesheet running into thousands of pages included material which did not support any of the witness statements. The Court said there were “misleading averments” in the chargesheet. It also took strong exception to the repeated use of the phrase “South Group” by CBI, saying that selective adoption of a geographically defined label is plainly arbitrary and unwarranted.

CBI stated that crucial aspects of the case have not been considered by the court and moved to Delhi High Court challenging the discharge of Kejriwal, Sisodia and others. CBI has claimed that the excise policy was "manipulated" to facilitate some traders and the CBI was able to trace the money laundering. However, the trial court proceeded to discharge the accused without considering the collaborative material on record. It has claimed that this is a clear case of corruption, with meticulous evidence being collected by CBI. The Delhi High Court has issued notice on this plea. The High Court has also stayed the observations made by the trial court against CBI.

=== Important arrests ===
Around 20 people have been arrested so far in this case, almost all of whom are now out of Bail.

Name	Political party	Date of arrest	Current status
Arvind Kejriwal	Aam Aadmi Party	21 March 2024	Discharged in March 2026.
K. Kavitha	Bharat Rashtra Samithi	15 March 2024	Discharged in March 2026
Sanjay Singh	Aam Aadmi Party	4 October 2023	Discharged in March 2026.
Magunta Raghav, Son of Magunta Sreenivasulu Reddy	YSR Congress Party	10 February 2023	Granted plea bail in October, 2024 for cooperating with investigation.
Manish Sisodia	Aam Aadmi Party	26 February 2023	Discharged in March 2026.
Satyendra Kumar Jain	Aam Aadmi Party	30 May 2022	Discharged in March 2026.

== See also ==
- Corruption in India
- 2011 Indian Anti-Corruption Movement
- Government of Delhi
- Gate Scandals
- Arrest of Arvind Kejriwal
