= Arrest of Arvind Kejriwal =

2024 arrest of Chief Minister of Delhi

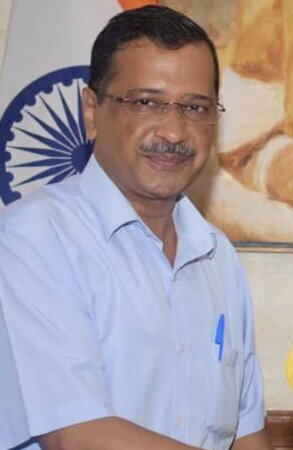
Arvind Kejriwal

Arvind Kejriwal, the then-Chief Minister of Delhi, was arrested on 21 March 2024 by the Enforcement Directorate (ED) after not responding to nine summons in connection with the alleged Delhi liquor policy money laundering case, becoming the first sitting chief minister in Indian history to be arrested. He was subsequently arrested by the Central Bureau of Investigation (CBI) in June 2024 and granted bail by the Supreme Court in September 2024. In February 2026, a Delhi court discharged Kejriwal and 22 others in the CBI case, finding insufficient evidence to proceed with the trial.

== Background ==
In June 2022, a batch of complaints alleging a "multi-crore scam" in the now-scrapped Delhi excise policy were filed, one of which was filed with the Delhi Police by former Delhi Congress president Anil Kumar Chaudhary. Kejriwal and his allies had been accused by political rivals, the Bharatiya Janata Party (BJP), of selling liquor licences and receiving kickbacks from private vendors. The ED had alleged that it had evidence of Aam Aadmi Party (AAP) receiving millions of dollars from a liquor group. Several high-ranking members of the AAP had previously been arrested in connection with the alleged scam, including the then Former Deputy Chief Minister of Delhi, Manish Sisodia in March 2023.

== Arrest ==
Kejriwal received nine summons from the Enforcement Directorate (ED) for the investigation into the Delhi excise policy case. Kejriwal skipped all of the summons. After he skipped the eight summon, on 7 March the ED filed a second complaint against him in a Delhi magistrate court, for repeatedly skipping its summons, which directed him to appear physically on 16 March. Kejriwal moved a sessions court challenging the magistrate courts' order and the two ED complaints, but the sessions court did not grant exemption from physical appearance. Kejriwal then appeared physically on 16 March in the magistrate court where he was granted bail for not complying with the eight ED summons. Following the ninth summon, Kejriwal filed a plea in the Delhi High Court challenging this summon and seeking protection from coercive action, which the High Court rejected on March 21.

Kejriwal was arrested on 21 March 2024 at 9 pm IST following a raid on his home by the ED. As he was being taken away, supporters and Aam Aadmi Party (AAP) workers were protesting outside his residence. AAP leaders alleged that Bharatiya Janata Party collected protection money of worth ₹60 crore (equivalent to ₹64 crore or US$6.8 million in 2026) in the form of electoral bonds from the alleged liquor scam kingpin Sarath Chandra Reddy's Aurobindo Pharma Limited per a report who later became an approver. Kejriwal was remanded until 28 March 2024, and remained in the custody of the ED. The Delhi High Court dismissed Chief Minister Arvind Kejriwal's petition against his arrest.

On 10 May, the Supreme Court granted him interim bail on the case till 1 June 2024 in view of campaigning for 2024 Indian general election. Kejriwal surrendered at the Tihar Jail on 2 June 2024 after the expiration of this bail. A Delhi trial court granted bail to Kejriwal on 20 June but the bail was stayed by the Delhi High Court on 21 June before he could be released. Kejriwal was questioned for 3 days and arrested on 26 June 2024 by Central Bureau of Investigation (CBI) from Tihar Jail and subsequently was sent to judicial custody till 12 July. The Supreme Court granted interim bail to Kejriwal in money laundering case related to the excise policy case on 12 July 2024, however, he remained in Tihar Jail as he was also arrested by CBI in corruption case related to the alleged liquor policy scam.

A two-judge Supreme Court bench granted him bail in the CBI corruption case on 13 September 2024. The bench held that continued incarceration would violate his right to liberty. However he served in prison for more than 5 months. On February 27, 2026, the Rouse Avenue Court discharged Kejriwal along with others in this case, noting the accusations were not supported by sufficient material.

== Reactions ==
=== Domestic ===
The arrest caused numerous protests in Delhi on 26 March 2024, with AAP supporters marching to the Prime Minister's residence at 7, Race Course Road while BJP supporters demanding Kejriwal's resignation marched to the Secretariat Building, New Delhi.

Prominent opposition leaders have voiced strong opposition to Kejriwal's arrest, framing it as part of a broader authoritarian trend under the current government. Rahul Gandhi, for instance, described the central government's actions as those of a "scared dictator" aiming to create a "dead democracy".

Raaj Kumar Anand resigned as minister of social welfare from the Delhi cabinet and also tendered his resignation from the AAP. He said that did not want his name to be associated with "corruption" after Delhi High Court's rejection of Kejriwal's bail.

=== International ===
- United Nations:
  - UN Secretary-General Antonio Guterres's spokesperson Stephane Dujarric said, "We very much hope that in India, as in any country that is having elections, that everyone's rights are protected, including political and civil rights, and everyone is able to vote in an atmosphere that is free and fair."
- United States:
  - United States Department of State spokesperson Matthew Miller said, "We continue to follow these actions closely, including the arrest of Delhi CM Arvind Kejriwal. We are also aware of the Congress party's allegations that tax authorities have frozen some of their bank accounts in a manner that will make it challenging to effectively campaign in the upcoming elections." A spokesperson for the United States Department of State said that the US was closely following reports of Kejriwal's arrest and that they "encourage a fair, transparent, and timely legal process for Chief Minister Kejriwal".
    - In response, Indian Ministry of External Affairs (MEA) said that India's legal processes were "based on an independent judiciary" and that they were "committed to objective and timely outcomes."
- Germany:
  - A spokesperson for the German Federal Foreign Office said Germany "takes note" of Kejriwal's arrest and expected that the "standards relating to independence of judiciary and basic democratic principles" will also apply to this case.
    - In response, the MEA said that the remarks were seen as "interfering in our judicial process" and "undermining the independence of our judiciary".
- Amnesty International, an international human rights group said that the arrest of Kejriwal and the "freezing of Indian National Congress' bank accounts", a few weeks before India's general elections showed "the authorities' blatant failure to uphold the country's international human rights obligations".

== See also ==
- 2022 Delhi liquor policy case
- List of scandals in India
