= Shakur Basti Assembly constituency =

Constituency of the Delhi legislative assembly in India

Coordinates: 28.682°N 77.116°E

Shakur Basti
- Constituency No. 15 for the Delhi Legislative Assembly

Constituency details
- Country: India
- Region: North India
- State: Delhi
- District: Chandni Chowk
- Lok Sabha constituency: Chandni Chowk
- Reservation: None

Member of Legislative Assembly
- 8th Delhi Legislative Assembly
- Incumbent Karnail Singh
- Party: BJP
- Elected year: 2025

Shakur Basti Assembly constituency is one of the seventy Delhi assembly constituencies of Delhi in northern India. Shakur Basti assembly constituency is a part of Chandni Chowk (Lok Sabha constituency).

== Members of the Legislative Assembly ==
Year	Name	Party
1993	Gauri Shankar Bharadwaj	Bharatiya Janata Party
1998	S. C. Vats	Indian National Congress
2003	S. C. Vats	Indian National Congress
2008	Shyam Lal Garg	Bharatiya Janata Party
2013	Satyendra Kumar Jain	Aam Aadmi Party
2015	Satyendra Kumar Jain	Aam Aadmi Party
2020	Satyendra Kumar Jain	Aam Aadmi Party
2025	Karnail Singh	Bharatiya Janata Party

== Election results ==
=== 2025 ===
Delhi Assembly elections, 2025: Shakur Basti
Party	Candidate	Votes	%	±%
BJP	Karnail Singh	56,869	57.1	▲13.16
AAP	Satyender Kumar Jain	35,871	36.0	▼15.60
INC	Satish Luthra	5,784	5.8	▲2.39
NOTA	None of the above	673	0.4	
Majority		20,998	21.2	▲13.54
Turnout		98,979	63.5	▼4.37
BJP gain from AAP		Swing		

=== 2020 ===
Delhi Assembly elections, 2020: Shakur Basti
Party	Candidate	Votes	%	±%
AAP	Satyender Kumar Jain	51,165	51.60	+2.93
BJP	S. C. Vats	43,573	43.94	−1.77
INC	Dev Raj Arora	3,382	3.41	−1.13
NOTA	None of the above	641	0.65	+0.23
BSP	Asha Ram	289	0.29	+0.07
Majority		7,592	7.66	+4.70
Turnout		99,245	67.87	−4.03
AAP hold		Swing	+2.93	

=== 2015 ===
Delhi Assembly elections, 2015: Shakur Basti
Party	Candidate	Votes	%	±%
AAP	Satyender Kumar Jain	51,530	48.67	+6.37
BJP	S. C. Vats	48,397	45.71	+10.84
INC	Chaman Lal Sharma	4,812	4.54	−15.22
NOTA	None	438	0.41	
Majority		3,133	2.96	−4.46
Turnout		1,05,899	71.91	
AAP hold		Swing	+6.37	

=== 2013 ===
Delhi Assembly elections, 2013: Shakur Basti
Party	Candidate	Votes	%	±%
AAP	Satyender Kumar Jain	40,232	42.30	
BJP	Shyam Lal Garg	33,170	34.87	−15.33
INC	Dr. S. C. Vats	18,799	19.76	−25.47
Independent	Jawahar Lal Luthra	1,321	1.39	
NOTA	None of the Above	583	0.61	
Majority		7,062	7.42	
Turnout		95,252	70.85	+12.52
AAP gain from BJP		Swing		

=== 2008 ===
Delhi Assembly elections, 2008: Shakur Basti
Party	Candidate	Votes	%	±%
BJP	Shyam Lal Garg	40,444	50.20	+14.06
INC	Dr. S. C. Vats	36,444	45.23	−10.98
BSP	Jaideep Das Gupta	2,683	3.33	
Independent	Smarti Goel	497	0.62	
Independent	Sansar Chand	275	0.34	
Independent	Sushil Jain	224	0.28	
Majority		4,000	4.97	
Turnout		80,567	58.27	+0.01
BJP gain from INC		Swing		

=== 2003 ===
Delhi Assembly elections, 2003: Shakur Basti
Party	Candidate	Votes	%	±%
INC	Dr. S. C. Vats	39,200	56.21	+0.07
BJP	Shyam Lal Garg	25,200	36.14	−6.53
Independent	Banwari Lal Nagpal	3,473	4.98	
SP	Pappu	317	0.45	
Independent	Sanjay	305	0.44	
SS	Rajan Gupta	279	0.40	+0.14
Independent	Babu Lal Barwa	256	0.37	
Independent	Ram Singh	227	0.33	
Independent	Pradeep	121	0.17	
Independent	Vipender Singh	111	0.16	
Independent	Ram Pal Bairwa	62	0.09	
Independent	Vikram Prasad	47	0.07	
Independent	Mangal	45	0.06	
Independent	Kishan	38	0.05	
Independent	Rajender Kumar	29	0.04	
Independent	Dharmender	26	0.04	
Majority		14,000	20.07	
Turnout		69,736	58.26	+4.18
INC hold		Swing		

=== 1998 ===
Delhi Assembly elections, 1998: Shakur Basti
Party	Candidate	Votes	%	±%
INC	Dr. S. C. Vats	36,010	56.14	+18.02
BJP	Gauri Shankar Bharadwaj	27,371	42.67	−8.78
Independent	Pradeep	417	0.65	
JP	Deepak Kumar Gupta	184	0.29	−0.39
SS	Ajay Srivastava	166	0.26	
Majority		8,639	13.47	
Turnout		64,148	54.08	−14.38
INC gain from BJP		Swing		

=== 1993 ===
Delhi Assembly elections, 1993: Shakur Basti
Party	Candidate	Votes	%	±%
BJP	Gauri Shankar Bharadwaj	28,933	51.45	
INC	Kamal Kant Sharma	21,437	38.12	
JD	Suresh Yadav	2,289	4.07	
BSP	Sukh Charan Kapil	1,701	3.02	
CPI(M)	Vijay Bhatia	499	0.89	
Independent	Mohan Lal	429	0.76	
JP	Anil Kumar Bharu	385	0.68	
Independent	Ajeet Singh	172	0.31	
Independent	Ghanshyam Dass	137	0.24	
BLMD	Shiv Lal Yadav	67	0.12	
IDSP	Suresh	40	0.07	
Independent	Gian Chand Hans	35	0.06	
Independent	K S Khaira	34	0.06	
Independent	Kewal Krishan	33	0.06	
Independent	Pradeep Kumar	22	0.04	
Independent	Bhagwan Sahai Jarwal	13	0.02	
Independent	Tejbir Singh	11	0.02	
Majority		7,496	13.33	
Turnout		56,237	68.46	
BJP win (new seat)				
