= Karnail Singh =

Indian politician

Karnail Singh (born 1968) is an Indian politician from Delhi, who is serving as a member of the Delhi Legislative Assembly from Shakur Basti Assembly constituency in North Delhi district. He won the 2025 Delhi Legislative Assembly election representing the Bharatiya Janata Party.

== Early life and education ==
Singh is from Shakur Basti, North Delhi district. He is the son of late Telu Singh. He studied Class 10 at SDM High School and passed matriculation examinations conducted by Haryana Vidyalaya Siksha Board, Sonipat in 1984. Later, he discontinued his studies.

== Career ==
Singh won from Shakur Basti Assembly constituency representing the Bharatiya Janata Party in the 2025 Delhi Legislative Assembly election. He polled 56,869 votes and defeated his nearest rival, sitting MLA and former minister, Satyendra Jain of the Aam Aadmi Party, by a margin of 20,998 votes.
