= Vivekananda Institute of Professional Studies =

VIPS, Delhi college

Coordinates: 28.7215°N 77.1408°E

Vivekananda Institute of Professional Studies-Technical Campus
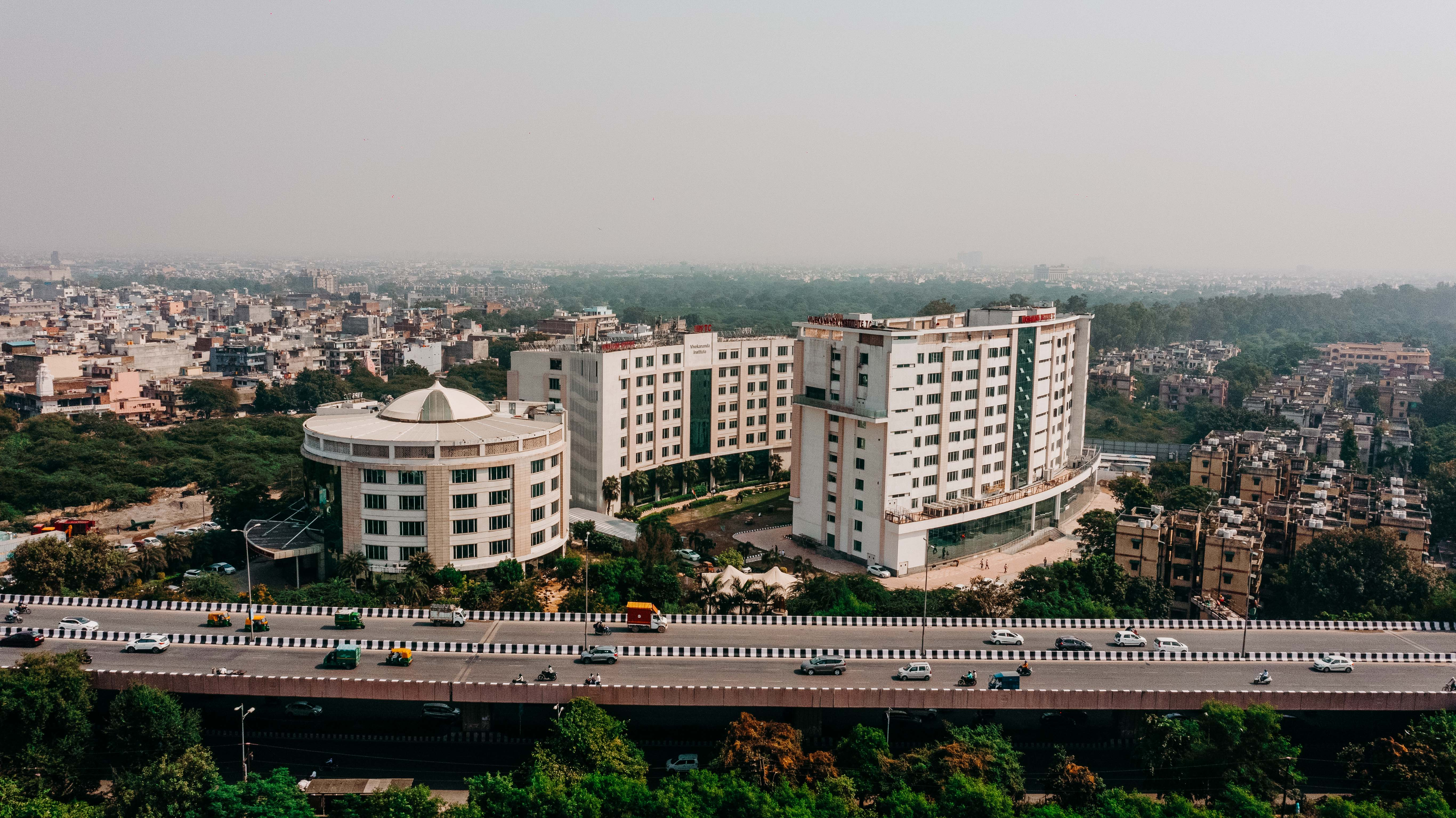
- Type: Private
- Established: 1997
- Affiliations: AICTE, NAAC
- Academic affiliations: Guru Gobind Singh Indraprastha University
- Chairman: S. C. Vats
- Chairperson: R. Venkata Rao
- Location: Pitampura, Delhi, India
- Campus: Urban
- Colors
- Nickname: VIPS-TC
- Mascot: Swami Vivekananda
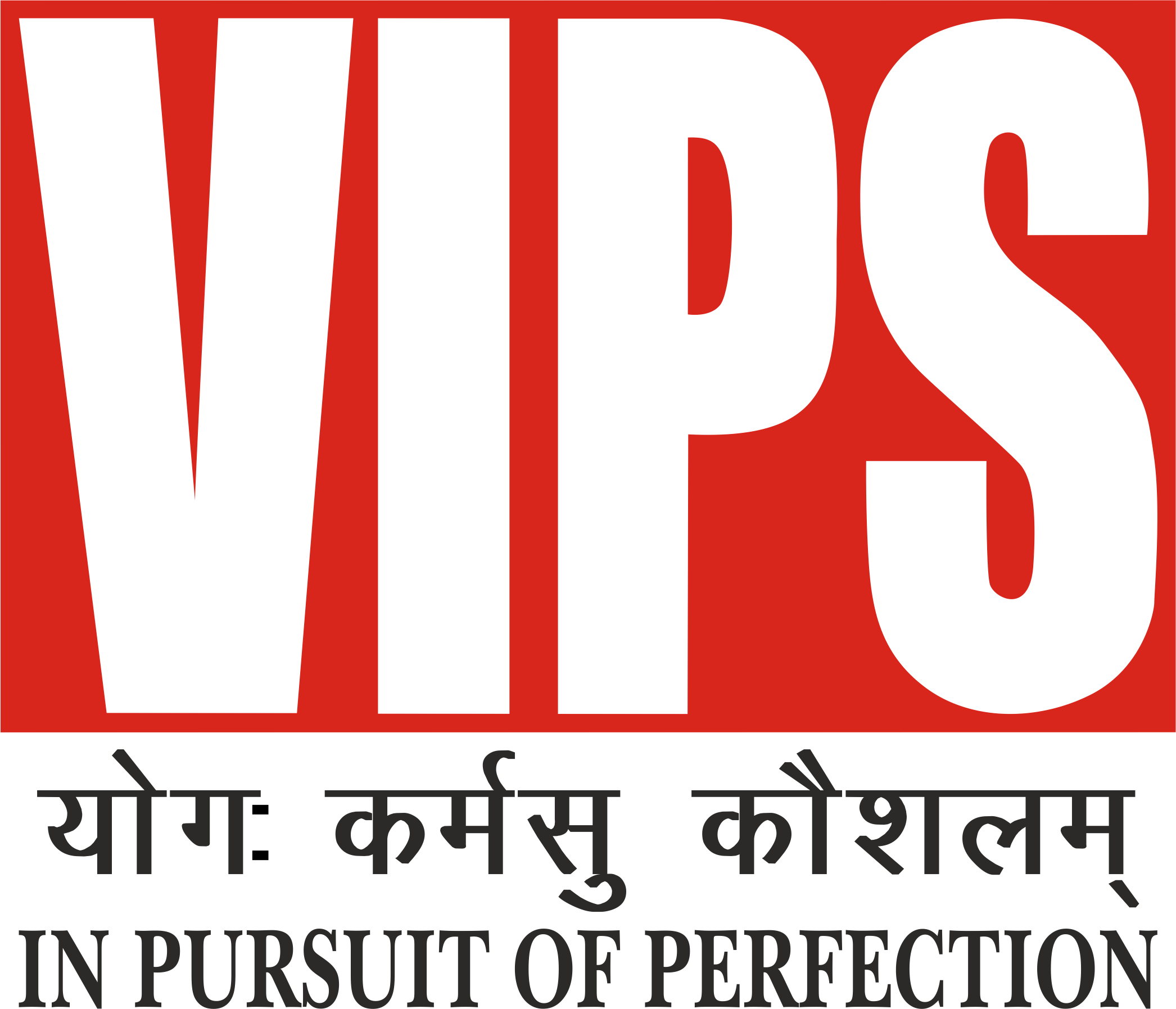

Vivekananda Institute of Professional Studies-Technical Campus (VIPS-TC) is a private college in Pitampura, New Delhi, India. The institute is affiliated with Guru Gobind Singh Indraprastha University (GGSIPU). It has seven different schools/departments. The college admits students in the different schools based on their performance in the IPU common entrance test for the respective course. Apart from the Common entrance test, the college also accepts CLAT for law and CAT scores for business administration courses.

The college received "A++" grade accreditation from the NAAC team in December 2022.

== History ==
The institute was established by S. C. Vats following a meeting he had with Swami Jitatmananda in 1997 who told him he should establish an institute of higher education in New Delhi in the name of Swami Vivekananda. Its first campus was established in Moti Nagar, later in 2013 the institute shifted to its current location in Pitampura

== Admission processes ==
Admissions at VIPS are on the basis on the merit of the candidate drawn on the basis of the Common Entrance Test (CET & CUET) and other such procedures of the GGSIPU. For all courses covered under CET, the university prepares a list of candidates in the order of merit in each category.

== Recognition and accreditation ==
VIPS is approved by the All India Council for Technical Education (AICTE). It has been accredited by the National Assessment and Accreditation Council (NAAC) with an "A++" grade.

Its BCA course was ranked all India 15th and the BBA course was ranked All India 36th rank in the year 2021.

== Schools ==
1. Vivekananda School of Law and Legal Studies (VSLLS)
2. Vivekananda School of Information Technology (VSIT)
3. Vivekananda School of Business Studies (VSBS)
4. Vivekananda School of Journalism and Mass Communication (VSJMC)
5. Vivekananda School of Economics (VSE)
6. Vivekananda School of English Studies (VSES)
7. Vivekananda School of Engineering & Technology (VSE&T)

== Chairpersons ==
- Prof. T.V. Subba Rao (Current)
- Prof. R. Venkata Rao
- Prof. B.T. Kaul
- Prof. V.B. Coutinho

== Programmes ==
The college offers the following courses:

- B.Tech
- BBA
- BBA in Banking and Insurance
- B.A. (Hons) in Economics
- BA LLB
- LLB
- B.Com (Hons)
- BCA
- BA in Journalism and Mass Communication
- LLM
- BBA LLB
- MCA
- BA (Hons) in English
- MBA
- PG Diploma in Management

== See also ==
- List of institutions of higher education in Delhi
- Law studies
- Media studies
