= S. C. Vats =

Indian politician and educationalist

Personal details
- Party: Bharatiya Janata Party 2015- Indian National Congress till 2015
- Spouse: Bimla Vats
- Children: 2
- Education: AU Tibbia College
- Occupation: Politician, Clinician
- Awards: Best Legislator Award, Delhi Assembly constituency, 2006
- Website: scvats.in

Suresh Chand Vats (born September 1945) is a veteran Indian politician and an educationist who currently heads the governing body of Vivekananda Institute of Professional Studies, imparting education in the field of Law, Journalism and Information Technology. He is a former member of the Delhi Legislative Assembly Shakur Basti and won the elections twice, in 1998 and 2003 contesting as an Indian National Congress candidate. In 2008 he lost to BJP's Shayam Lal Garg by a margin of 4000 votes. In 2015, S. C. Vats contested as a Bharatiya Janata Party candidate and lost to Aam Aadmi Party's candidate Satyendra Kumar Jain by a margin of 3,133 votes from Shakur Basti (Delhi Assembly constituency). Vats has also been Member of Delhi Metropolitan Council from 1983 to 1989. He has chaired the governing bodies of half a dozen reputed National Institutes with distinction.

He is an initiated disciple of Ramakrishna Mission and tries to practice the precepts as preached by Swami Vivekananda.

In 2015, he was booked under Sections 354 (assault or criminal force to woman with intent to outrage her modesty) and 376 (rape) of IPC for allegedly molesting and sexually assaulting a woman while she was attached to Vivekananda Institute of Professional Studies of which Mr. Vats is chairperson in Delhi.

In 2020, S. C. Vats again contested as a Bharatiya Janata Party candidate and lost to Aam Aadmi Party's candidate Satyendra Kumar Jain for second time by a margin of 7,592 votes from Shakur Basti (Delhi Assembly constituency).

== Political career ==
S. C. Vats entered politics in 1970s. He is a former member of the Delhi Legislative Assembly. S. C. Vats has won the Best Legislator Award for the year 2006 conferred by Hon'ble Speaker of Lok Sabha Sh. Somnath Chatterjee.

S. C. Vats switched to Bhartiya Janata Party on 1 January 2015 citing an 'ideological vacuum' in Congress. The Public Accounts Committee (PAC), under the chairmanship of S. C. Vats, in Delhi Assembly had indicted Sheila Dikshit government over privatisation of power. The Delhi Assembly had unanimously passed the Vats Committee report recommending a CBI probe into the privatisation of power and the alleged dubious role of the Core Committee members comprising senior bureaucrats that had negotiated the power privatisation process.
