= Anil Baijal =

Ex. Lieutenant Governor of Delhi

The Honourable Anil Baijal
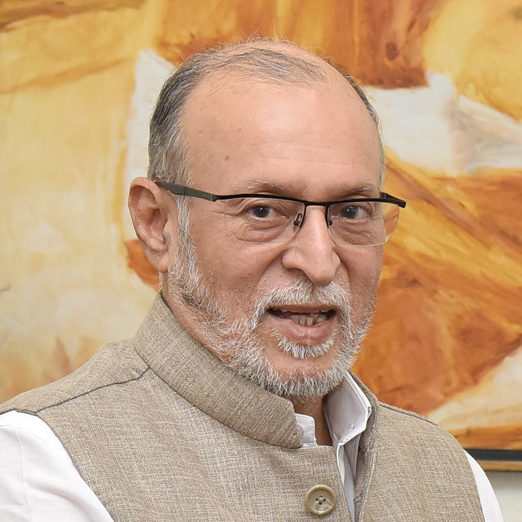
- Baijal in 2017

Lieutenant Governor of Delhi
- In office 31 December 2016 – 23 May 2022
- President: Pranab Mukherjee; Ram Nath Kovind
- Chief Minister: Arvind Kejriwal
- Preceded by: Najeeb Jung
- Succeeded by: Vinai Kumar Saxena

Urban Development Secretary, Government of India
- In office 2 July 2004 – 31 October 2006
- Minister: Ghulam Nabi Azad; Manmohan Singh; Jaipal Reddy
- Preceded by: N. N. Khanna
- Succeeded by: M. Ramachandran

Home Secretary, Government of India
- In office 8 February 2004 – 1 July 2004
- Minister: L. K. Advani; Shivraj Patil
- Preceded by: N. Gopalaswami
- Succeeded by: Dhirendra Singh

Personal details
- Born: 1 November 1946 (age 79) Allahabad, United Provinces, British India (now Prayagraj, Uttar Pradesh, India)
- Education: University of Allahabad; University of East Anglia

Anil Baijal (born 1 November 1946) is a retired Indian Administrative Service (IAS) officer and served as the 21st Lieutenant Governor of Delhi. He took over office on 31 December 2016 after the sudden resignation of Najeeb Jung. He resigned from the post of Lieutenant Governor and sent his resignation letter to President of India on 18 May 2022 as his term was over.

== Early life and education ==
Baijal holds a master's degree in arts from the University of Allahabad and a master's degree in development economics from the University of East Anglia.

== Career ==
Baijal is a 1969 batch IAS officer from the AGMUT (Arunachal Pradesh-Goa-Mizoram and Union Territory) cadre. He has served as Union Home Secretary under the Atal Bihari Vajpayee government. During his tenure as Union Home Secretary, he removed Kiran Bedi from her post as the head of jails accusing her of breaking every clause in the jail manual. He has also served as the Chairman of Delhi Development Authority; Chief Secretary of Andaman & Nicobar Islands; additional Home Secretary in the Ministry of Information and Broadcasting; MD of Indian Airlines; CEO of Prasar Bharati; Development Commissioner of Goa; Commissioner (Sales Tax and Excise) of Delhi; Councilor in Charge of India Aid Mission in Nepal. He was responsible for the introduction of DD Bharti.

He retired from service in 2006 as Secretary of the Urban Development Ministry. After retirement, he was actively associated with the planning and implementation of ₹60,000 crore Jawaharlal Nehru National Urban Renewal Mission (JNNURM) launched by the Manmohan Singh government. He served as President of the National Institute of Urban Affairs (2012-2014). He has also served on the executive council of the Vivekananda International Foundation think-tank and multiple corporate boards including IDFC bank. He has also served as an advisor, on the National e-Governance Advisory Group (NAG); Advisory Group for Integrated Development of Power, Coal, and Renewable Energy; Committee on implementation of Corporate Social Responsibility in the current Narendra Modi government.

== Allegations ==
On 6 August 2022, the then Deputy Chief Minister of Delhi Manish Sisodia accused Anil Baijal of corruption. Sisodia said that he has written to the Central Bureau of Investigation (CBI) for a probe into Baijal's decision to open liquor shops in unauthorised colonies. He added that the sudden change in the decision caused losses worth thousands of crores of rupees to the Delhi Government.

Government offices
Preceded by Najeeb Jung	Lieutenant Governor of Delhi; 31 December 2016 – 18 May 2022	Succeeded by Vinai Kumar Saxena
