= Ravinder Singh Negi =

Indian politician

Ravinder Singh Negi रविन्दर सिंह नेगी
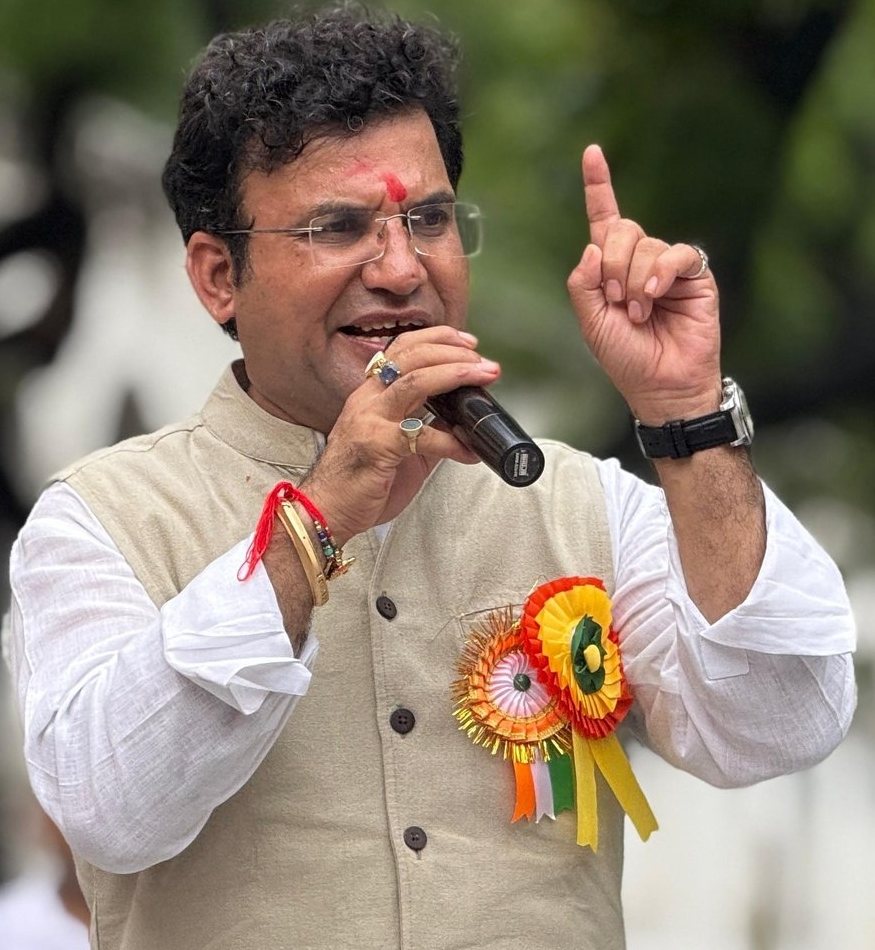
- Negi in 2025

Member of the Delhi Legislative Assembly
- Incumbent
- Assumed office 8 February 2025
- Preceded by: Manish Sisodia
- Constituency: Patparganj

Personal details
- Born: New Delhi, Delhi , India
- Party: Bharatiya Janata Party
- Education: DU (B.A.)
- Profession: Politician

Ravinder Singh Negi or Ravi Negi is an Indian politician from Delhi. He was elected to the Delhi Legislative Assembly from Patparganj Assembly Constituency in the 2025 Assembly elections.

== Political career ==
Ravinder Singh Negi (Ravi Negi) began his political journey in 2020 serving as Mandal Adhyaksh Vinod Nagar Mandal of the BJP Delhi unit and contested 2020 Delhi Assembly election on the BJP ticket, narrowly losing to the AAP's Manish Sisodia by just 1.75 percent votes. He later contested 2022 Municipal Corporation of Delhi elections and defeated the AAP candidate by a margin of 2,311 votes. He gained media attention when he forced meat shops to close during Navratri in 2023. Later he fought in the Delhi Assembly 2025 Election and defeated Aam Aadmi Party candidate, Awadh Ojha by a massive margin of over 28072 votes. Prime Minister Narendra Modi was also seen touching his feet in an election rally of the party.
