= Anil Chaudhary (politician) =

Indian politician

President of Delhi Pradesh Congress Committee
- In office 11 March 2020 – 31 August 2023
- Preceded by: Subhash Chopra
- Succeeded by: Arvinder Singh Lovely

Member of the Delhi Legislative Assembly
- In office 2008 – 2013
- Preceded by: Amrish Singh Gautam
- Succeeded by: Manish Sisodia
- Constituency: Patparganj

Personal details
- Born: 1976 (age 49–50) Delhi, India
- Party: Indian National Congress
- Occupation: Politician

Anil Chaudhary is an Indian politician from Delhi. He served as a member of Delhi Legislative Assembly representing Patparganj Assembly constituency. He also served as the President of Delhi Pradesh Congress Committee. He is a former President of Delhi Pradesh Youth Congress.

== Position held ==
Year	Description
2008 - 2013	Elected to 4th Delhi Assembly from Patparganj Assembly constituency

Party political offices
Preceded by Subhash Chopra	President; Delhi Pradesh Congress Committee; 11 March 2020 – present	Incumbent
