= Parivartan =

Indian Not for profit organization

Parivartan (Transformation) is a grass-roots activism organization based in the Sundar Nagari area of New Delhi, India. During the 2000s, Parivartan used Right to Information (RTI) to address citizens' grievances related to Public Distribution System (PDS), public works, social welfare schemes, income tax and electricity. By 2012, Parivartan was largely inactive, and its main leaders Arvind Kejriwal and Manish Sisodia had launched a political party - the Aam Aadmi Party.

== Establishment ==
Parivartan was founded by a few citizens of Delhi, including Arvind Kejriwal and Manish Sisodia. It was not a registered NGO - it ran on individual donations, and was characterised as a jan andolan ("people's movement") by its members. Later, in 2005, Kejriwal and Manish Sisodia launched Kabir, a registered NGO named after the medieval philosopher Kabir. Like Parivartan, Kabir was also focused on RTI and participatory governance. However, unlike Parivartan, it accepted institutional donations. According to Kejriwal, Kabir was mainly run by Sisodia.

In 2003, the group had 450 registered volunteers in Delhi, out of whom 60 were regularly active.

== Anti-bribe campaigns ==
In 2000, Parivartan requested the Tax Commissioner to make the Income Tax department more transparent. When the request was overlooked, the group filed a public interest litigation (PIL) demanding transparency in public dealings of the Income Tax department, and also organized a satyagraha outside the Chief Commissioner's office. As a result of Parivartan's protests, the Commissioner implemented tax reforms. Kejriwal and other activists also stationed themselves outside the electricity department, asking visitors not to pay bribes and offered to help them in getting work done for free.

== Audit of public works ==
In 2001, the Delhi government enacted a state-level Right To Information (RTI) Act, which allowed the citizens to access government records for a small fee. Parivartan used RTI to help people get their work done in government departments without paying a bribe. In March 2002, Parivartan staged a demonstration in front of Municipal Corporation of Delhi (MCD), forcing the MCD officials to share information under the RTI directives. In 2002, the group obtained official reports on 68 public works projects in the area, and performed a community-led audit on them by comparing the claimed work to the actual work done. The campaign exposed misappropriations worth ₹ 7 million in 64 of the projects. On 14 December 2002, Parivartan organised a jan sunvai (public hearing) in Sundar Nagari, to examine the work of MCD's Engineering Department. In this public hearing, the local residents held public officials and leaders accountable for the lack of development in the locality, based on the audit. The local MLA, councillor and MCD engineers tried to disrupt the hearing, and the police had to be called in to maintain order.

In February 2003, the citizens of Sundar Nagari found that the MCD workers laying out a street were using poor quality sand and less cement than required. The citizens, led by Parivartan members, complained to MCD. The Junior Engineer involved in the project was transferred, and the road was laid out with proper quality material.

== Expose of PDS scams ==
In February 2002, a poor widow named Triveni had approached Parivartan, with the complaint that the ration shops were always out of stock whenever she needed subsidised foodgrains offered under PDS. Parivartan obtained her ration records using RTI, and found that on paper, she had been receiving her full quota of foodgrains. To probe other such cases, Parivartan decided to obtain more such records. However, the Food and Civil Supplies Department denied the request, stating that these records were private. After protests from Parivartan, the administration agreed to release the records. However, a group of 17 ration shop dealers approached the Delhi High Court, and obtained a stay against Parivartan's attempts to access 'private' records. Parivartan then asked citizens to file individual RTI applications and get their records themselves. On 29 August 2003, around 300 people filed RTI applications to access their ration records. Subsequently, Parivartan obtained all the records for 25 ration shops in the area using RTI applications. It found that over 90% of the subsidised foodgrains were being siphoned off by the dealers in collusion with civic officials. The campaign resulted in violent attacks on Kejriwal's team; in one such attack, the corrupt dealers slit the throat of a young activist Santosh, badly wounding her. The residents of the community protested against the attack by organising a rally and hunger strikes. The protests received considerable public attention and forced the officials to take action against the corruption.

In 2008, the computerisation of PDS records by the Food and Civil Supplies Department exposed a massive scam centered on duplicate ration cards. As many as 109 ration cards had been issued in name of a single resident, and around 10 percent of the total ration cards in Delhi were found to be bogus. Parivartan surveyed the ration card holders in Sundar Nagari, and found that most people were not aware that duplicate cards had been issued in their names. Parivartan estimated that in the past four years, the state had suffered a loss of ₹ 259.5 crore owing to diversion of subsidized food grains on the basis of bogus ration cards. The group demanded an independent inquiry into the case, alleging a nexus between the ration shop dealers and civic officials.

== Other campaigns ==
In November 2004, Parivartan used RTI applications to access communication between government agencies and the World Bank, regarding a project for privatisation of water supply. The activists found that the project would have spent ₹ 105 crore on annual salaries of 84 foreign experts, although the total annual budget of the Delhi Water Board was only ₹ 163 crore. They claimed that the project would have hiked water tariffs ten-fold, thus effectively cutting off the water supply to the city's poor. The project was stalled as a result of Parivartan's activism. The World Bank denied Parivartan's accusations, and criticised Kejriwal for "propagating serious mischaracterisations of the World Bank's actions and intention".

Another campaign by Parivartan led to a court order that required private schools, which had received public land at discounted prices, to admit more than 700 poor kids without fee.

== Recognition ==
In 2006, Kejriwal received the Ramon Magsaysay Award for Emergent Leadership, for his involvement with Parivartan. The award recognised him for activating the RTI movement at the grassroots, and empowering New Delhi's poor citizens to fight corruption. Kejriwal stated that the award belonged to every person associated with Parivartan.

== Decline ==
By 2012, Parivartan was largely inactive. Sundar Nagri, where the movement was concentrated, suffered from irregular water supply, unreliable PDS system and poorly done public works. Its founders - Arvind Kejriwal and Manish Sisodia - had entered politics under the banner of Aam Aadmi Party. The organisation at that time had two paid workers, one of whom, Santosh Koli, later died in a road incident not long after being selected as an election candidate by Aam Aadmi Party. These people were paid by the Public Cause Research Foundation, which had been founded by Kejriwal in 2006 using money that he received from the Ramon Magsaysay Award.

Kejriwal noted in 2012 that the success of the organisation was limited, saying that it was "ephemeral and delusionary in nature. We got success on the issue till the time we worked on it in that area but as we moved on to next issue the old issue became even worse than before."
