= Swaraj (book) =

2012 book by Arvind Kejriwal

- Cover page of 2012 print by Harper Collins India.
- Author: Arvind Kejriwal and others
- Language: Hindi, English, Bengali, Oriya, Malayalam, Marathi
- Subject: history
- Genre: Democratic framework of India
- Publication date: 2012 (HarperCollins)
- Publication place: India
- Pages: 151 (English edition)
- ISBN: 9788172237677

Swaraj is a 2012 book by the Indian social activist-turned-politician Arvind Kejriwal, who credits several people with writing it. Published in several languages, including English, Hindi, Bengali, Oriya, Marathi and Malayalam, the book questions the existing democratic framework in India and proposes a way how the people of India can achieve true Swaraj (self-rule).

== About the book ==
Swaraj presents a model of governance based on Gandhi's concept of Swaraj or "Home-Rule". Its central point is that power, which is concentrated in the hands of a few individuals in New Delhi and state capitals, must be vested to gram sabhas and mohalla sabhas (Not to be confused with gram or khap panchayats) so that the people may be empowered to take decisions affecting their lives. Citing examples of the Participatory budgeting model of Porto Alegre, the direct democracy model of Switzerland and USA, and the development model implemented by Popatrao Pawar, it proposes a model of governance wherein a sarpanch or local official can take decisions only with the consent of all the people of the village or town. Swaraj also addresses the social concerns of Indians. The book also mentions how India's natural resources are being looted by some crony corporates in alliance with corrupt politicians and how the nation of 1.2 billion is suffering because of a million corrupt people.

Kejriwal announced in September 2011 that he and others had completed the writing of Swaraj. It was published by HarperCollins and was launched on 29 July 2012 at Jantar Mantar in New Delhi. At the time of launch, Kejriwal said "The book highlights the shortcomings of the current model of centralised governance and explains how the real rule of the people can be brought about." He also said that he would not be earning any royalty from its sale as he wants to reach as many people as possible. Anti-corruption activist and Gandhian Anna Hazare wrote the foreword for the book.

The book has been translated to other Indian languages, such as Oriya. by Dr Dhanadakanta Mishra & Bengali by Sumanta Barick & Susanta Kumar Barick.

The Book in Bengali is available in Hard copies at the Party Offices in the state. Sumanta Barick and Susanta Kumar Barick are the own siblings and both have contributed in the book translation in the year 2013, after a few months they joined the party officially in Kolkata. At that moment, Sumanta Barick was a child who was only 16 years old.
