= Patparganj Assembly constituency =

Constituency of the Delhi legislative assembly in India

Coordinates: 28.61°N 77.29°E

Patparganj
- Constituency No. 57 for the Delhi Legislative Assembly

Constituency details
- Country: India
- Region: North India
- State: Delhi
- District: East Delhi
- Lok Sabha constituency: East Delhi
- Total electors: 2,32,125
- Reservation: None

Member of Legislative Assembly
- 8th Delhi Legislative Assembly
- Incumbent Ravinder Singh Negi
- Party: Bharatiya Janata Party
- Elected year: 2025

Patparganj Assembly constituency is one of the seventy Delhi assembly constituencies of Delhi in northern India. Patparganj assembly constituency is a part of East Delhi Lok Sabha constituency. 1

== Members of the Legislative Assembly ==
Election	Name	Party
1993	Gyan Chand	Bharatiya Janata Party
1998	Amrish Singh Gautam	Indian National Congress
2003	Amrish Singh Gautam	Indian National Congress
Major boundary changes
2008	Anil Chaudhary	Indian National Congress
2013	Manish Sisodia	Aam Aadmi Party
2015	Manish Sisodia	Aam Aadmi Party
2020	Manish Sisodia	Aam Aadmi Party
2025	Ravinder Singh Negi	Bharatiya Janata Party

== Election results ==
=== 2025 ===
Delhi Assembly elections, 2025: Patparganj
Party	Candidate	Votes	%	±%
BJP	Ravinder Singh Negi	74,060	53.41	▲6.34
AAP	Awadh Ojha	45,988	33.17	▼16.16
INC	Anil Chaudhary	16,549	11.94	▲9.97
NOTA	None of the above	692	0.50	+0.13
Majority		28,072	20.24	+17.99
Turnout		1,38,652	60.70	−0.82
BJP gain from AAP		Swing	+6.34	

=== 2020 ===
Delhi Assembly elections, 2020: Patparganj
Party	Candidate	Votes	%	±%
AAP	Manish Sisodia	70,163	49.33	−4.25
BJP	Ravinder Singh Negi	66,956	47.07	+13.91
INC	Laxman Rawat	2,802	1.97	−9.57
BSP	Rakesh	676	0.48	−0.38
RRP	Rakesh Suri	60	0.04	N/A
NOTA	None of the above	529	0.37	−0.01
Majority		3,207	2.25	−18.17
Turnout		1,42,397	61.52	−3.96
AAP hold		Swing	-4.25	

=== 2015 ===
Delhi Assembly elections, 2015: Patparganj
Party	Candidate	Votes	%	±%
AAP	Manish Sisodia	75,477	53.58	+12.05
BJP	Vinod Kumar Binny	46,716	33.16	+1.12
INC	Anil Chaudhary	16,260	11.54	−11.67
BSP	Nem Singh Premi	1,213	0.86	−0.90
NOTA	None of the above	533	0.38	−0.01
Majority		28,761	20.42	+10.93
Turnout		1,40,359	65.48	
AAP hold		Swing	+5.47	

=== 2013 ===
Delhi Assembly elections, 2013: Patparganj
Party	Candidate	Votes	%	±%
AAP	Manish Sisodia	50,211	41.53	
BJP	Nakul Bhardwaj	38,735	32.04	−9.60
INC	Anil Chaudhary	28,067	23.21	−19.19
BSP	Irshad Ali	2,127	1.76	−12.03
CPI	Kehar Singh	362	0.30	−0.40
NOTA	None	475	0.39	
Majority		11,476	9.49	+8.73
Turnout		120,977	63.95	
AAP gain from INC		Swing	+25.57	

=== 2008 ===
2008 Delhi state assembly elections: Patparganj
Party	Candidate	Votes	%	±%
INC	Anil Chaudhary	36,984	42.40	−10.97
BJP	Nakul Bhardwaj	36,336	41.64	+14.28
BSP	Madan Singh	12,032	13.79	−2.57
CPI	Shashi Kumar	613	0.70	
Independent	Pramod	462	0.53	
NCP	Krishan Kamal	310	0.36	
SP	Jaiveer Choudhary	248	0.28	−0.54
ABHM	Shyamji Rai	101	0.12	
Independent	Gopal Lal Sharma	92	0.11	
JD(U)	Sher Mohammed	74	0.08	−0.21
Majority		663	0.76	−25.25
Turnout		82,767	54.5	+7.21
INC hold		Swing	-10.97	

=== 2003 ===
Delhi Assembly elections, 2003: Patparganj
Party	Candidate	Votes	%	±%
INC	Amrish Singh Gautam	36,930	53.37	−4.69
BJP	Gian Chand	18,932	27.36	−2.29
BSP	Dhani Ram Shankhwar	11,322	16.36	+8.76
SS	Sunil	637	0.92	+0.78
SP	JaiveMadan Lal	569	0.82	
CPI(ML)L	Jetender Kumar	451	0.65	
JD(U)	Sanjeev Kumar	198	0.29	
NBNP	Deep Chand	156	0.23	
Majority		17,998	26.01	−2.40
Turnout		69,195	47.29	+2.31
INC hold		Swing	-4.69	

=== 1998 ===
Delhi Assembly elections, 1998: Patparganj
Party	Candidate	Votes	%	±%
INC	Amrish Singh Gautam	33,351	58.06	+28.57
BJP	Ganga Ram Pipal	17,030	29.65	−6.04
BSP	Rajveer Singh	4,363	7.60	+6.13
Independent	Bachan Singh	722	1.26	
UKD	Ranjana	650	1.13	
CPI(M)	Son Dayal	511	0.89	
JD	Dhan Devi	336	0.58	−30.60
ABDUP	Raj Kumar	157	0.27	
RJD	Raj Kumar Anand	154	0.27	
SS	Rajendra Kumar	82	0.14	−0.21
Independent	Sher Singh	54	0.09	
RPI	Narendra Kumar	31	0.05	
Majority		16,321	28.41	+23.90
Turnout		58,121	44.98	−10.90
INC gain from BJP		Swing	+28.57	

=== 1993 ===
Delhi Assembly elections, 1993: Patparganj
Party	Candidate	Votes	%	±%
BJP	Gyan Chand	17,020	35.69	
JD	Amrish Singh Gautam	14,873	31.18	
INC	Rame	14,065	29.49	
BSP	Shakuntala	703	1.47	
CPI	Kehar Singh	394	0.83	
Independent	Mukut Lal	279	0.58	
SS	Ranshyam Singh	166	0.35	
BAD	Budh Ram	125	0.26	
Mukt Bharat	Rajender Prasad Gautam	69	0.14	
Majority		2,147	4.51	
Turnout		48,664	55.88	
BJP hold		Swing		
