= List of deputy chief ministers of Delhi =

Deputy Chief Minister of the National Capital Territory of Delhi

Deputy Chief Minister of Delhi
- Incumbent; Vacant; Since 28 February 2023

The Deputy Chief Minister of the National Capital Territory of Delhi is the deputy to the Chief Minister of the National Capital Territory of Delhi, who is head of the government of the National Capital Territory of Delhi. The deputy chief minister is the second highest-ranking member of the National Capital Territory of Delhi Council of Ministers.

A deputy chief minister also holds a cabinet portfolio in the capital territory ministry. In the legislative assembly system of government, the chief minister is treated as the "first among equals" in the cabinet; the position of deputy chief minister is used to govern the capital territory with the support of a single party member or to bring political stability and strength within a coalition government, or in times of capital territory emergency, when a proper chain of command is necessary. On multiple occasions, proposals have arisen to make the post permanent, but without result. The same goes for the post of deputy prime minister at the national level.The position of deputy chief minister is not explicitly defined or mentioned in the Constitution of India. However, the Supreme Court of India has stated that the appointment of deputy chief ministers is not unconstitutional. The court has clarified that a deputy chief minister, for all practical purposes, remains a minister in the council of ministers headed by the chief minister and does not draw a higher salary or perks compared to other ministers.During the absence of the chief minister, the deputy-chief minister may chair cabinet meetings and lead the assembly majority. Various deputy chief ministers have also taken the oath of secrecy in line with the one that chief minister takes. This oath has also sparked controversies.

National Capital Territory of Delhi has had one deputy chief minister from AAP, Manish Sisodia.

== List ==
Key

- ^{RES} Resigned

Legend

- Aam Aadmi Party

No.	Portrait	Name (Birth–Death)	Term of office			Assembly (Election)	Political party (Note: This column only names the deputy chief minister's party. The state government he heads with chief minister may be a complex coalition of several parties and independents; these are not listed here.)	Chief Minister
No.	Portrait	Name (Birth–Death)	Assumed office	Left office	Time in office	Assembly (Election)	Political party	Chief Minister
1		Manish Sisodia (b. 1972)	14 February 2015	15 February 2020	8 years, 14 days	6th (2015)	Aam Aadmi Party	Arvind Kejriwal
1		Manish Sisodia (b. 1972)	16 February 2020	28 February 2023^{[RES]}	8 years, 14 days	7th (2020)	Aam Aadmi Party	Arvind Kejriwal

== Oath as the state deputy chief minister ==
The deputy chief minister serves five years in the office. The following is the oath of the Deputy chief minister of state:

I, <Name of Deputy Chief Minister>, do swear in the name of God/solemnly affirm that I will bear true faith and allegiance to the Constitution of India as by law established, that I will uphold the sovereignty and integrity of India, that I will faithfully and conscientiously discharge my duties as a Minister for the State of () and that I will do right to all manner of people in accordance with the Constitution and the law without fear or favour, affection or ill-will.

Oath of Secrecy

"I, [Name], do swear in the name of God / solemnly affirm that I will not directly or indirectly communicate or reveal to any person or persons any matter which shall be brought under my consideration or shall become known to me as a Minister for the State of [Name of State] except as may be required for the due discharge of my duties as such Minister."Pad ki Shapath (Oath of Office) "Main, [DCM ka Naam], Ishwar ki shapath leta hoon / satyanishtha se pratigyan karta hoon ki main vidhi dwara sthapit Bharat ke Samvidhan ke prati sachi shraddha aur nishtha rakhunga. Main Bharat ki prabhuta aur akhandta akshunn rakhunga. Main [State ka Naam] ke Rajya ke Upa Mukhya Mantri ke roop mein apne kartavyon ka shraddhapoorvak aur shuddh antahkaran se nirvahan karunga, tatha main bhay ya pakshpat, anurag ya dwesh ke bina, sabhi prakar ke logon ke prati Samvidhan aur vidhi ke anusar nyay karunga." B. Gopniyata ki Shapath (Oath of Secrecy) "Main, [DCM ka Naam], Ishwar ki shapath leta hoon / satyanishtha se pratigyan karta hoon ki jo vishay [State ka Naam] ke Rajya ke Mukhya Mantri ke roop mein mere vichar ke liye laya jayega athva mujhe gyaat hoga, use kisi vyakti ya vyaktityon ko, tab ke sivay jab ki aise UpaMukhya Mantri ke roop mein apne kartavyon ke uchit nirvahan ke liye aisa karna apekshit ho, main pratyaksh (directly) ya apratyaksh (indirectly) roop mein sansuchit ya prakat nahi karunga."

== See also ==
- List of current Indian deputy chief ministers
- History of the National Capital Territory of Delhi
- Elections in the National Capital Territory of Delhi
- National Capital Territory of Delhi Legislative Assembly
- List of chief ministers of the National Capital Territory of Delhi
- List of lieutenant governors of the National Capital Territory of Delhi
