= Satyendra Kumar Jain =

Indian politician

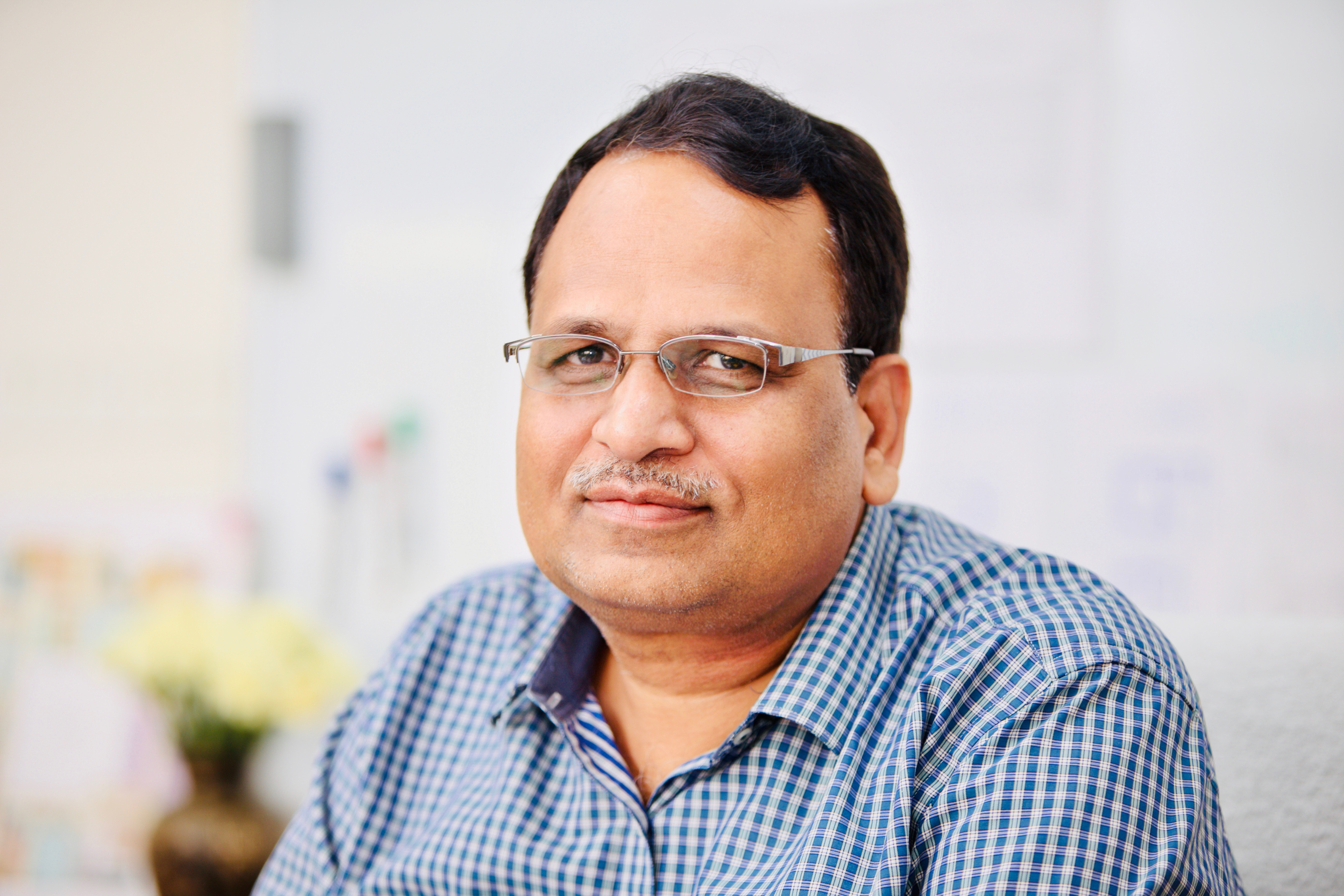

Cabinet Minister, Government of Delhi
- In office 14 February 2015 – 28 February 2023
- Lieutenant Governor: Najeeb Jung; Anil Baijal; Vinai Kumar Saxena
- Cabinet: Kejriwal ministry - III
- Chief Minister: Arvind Kejriwal
- Ministry and Departments: Home; Health; Power; Water; Industries; Urban development; Irrigation; Flood Control
- Preceded by: President's Rule
- In office 28 December 2013 – 14 February 2014
- Lieutenant Governor: Najeeb Jung
- Chief Minister: Arvind Kejriwal
- Ministry and Departments: Health; Industries
- Preceded by: Kiran Walia
- Succeeded by: President's Rule

Member of the Delhi Legislative Assembly
- In office 14 February 2015 – 8 February 2025
- Preceded by: President's rule
- Succeeded by: Karnail Singh
- Constituency: Shakur Basti
- In office 28 December 2013 – 14 February 2014
- Preceded by: Shyam Lal Garg
- Succeeded by: President's rule
- Constituency: Shakur Basti

Personal details
- Born: 3 October 1964 (age 61) Kirthal, Uttar Pradesh
- Party: Aam Aadmi Party
- Spouse: Poonam Jain
- Children: 2
- Education: Architecture
- Occupation: Politician
- Portfolio: Health & Family Welfare, Industries, Home, Power, Water, Urban Development and Irrigation & flood Control.

Satyendra Kumar Jain is an Indian politician who is a member of the Aam Aadmi Party (AAP) and a former Cabinet Minister in the Government of Delhi led by Arvind Kejriwal. Jain is an architect by profession. He was arrested by the Enforcement Directorate in May 2022 and was in custody since on allegations of money laundering, 9 months after which he submitted his resignation for the portfolios he held as a minister. He had spent more than 2 years in jail without bail or a trial or conviction, till the dismissal of the case against him.

His portfolios included Health and Family Welfare, Industries, Home, Power, Water, Urban Development and Irrigation & Flood Control. He served three terms as the Delhi Health Minister. In his first tenure he served as Health & Family welfare, Gurudwara Elections and Industries Minister from 28 December 2013 to 14 February 2014 and, In his Second tenure he served as Health & Family Welfare, Industries, Home, PWD, Power, Water, Transport, Urban Development and Irrigation & Flood Control from 14 February to 13 February 2020 in the previous AAP Governments.

== Early life ==
Satyendra Jain was born in Village Kirthal, District Baghpat, Uttar Pradesh. He did his schooling from Ramjas School, No.2, Delhi and completed Graduation in Architecture from the Indian Institute of Architects.

== Political career ==
Jain began his foray into politics after becoming involved with Anna Hazare's movement against corruption.

Prior to his involvement with politics Jain worked at the Central Public Works Department (CPWD), later quitting the job to set up an architectural consultancy firm. Jain has also been involved in work with social welfare organizations; he has been involved with Drishti, an organization working to help the visually impaired and SPARSH, an organization dedicated to the empowerment and welfare of the physically and mentally challenged. He served as Health & Family Welfare, Industries, Home, PWD, Power, Water, Urban Development and Irrigation & flood control.

Jain was arrested by Enforcement Directorate on 31 May 2022 due to allegations of money laundering. In March 2025, the Delhi government's anti-corruption branch registered a case against him on charges of corruption and bribery in a Rs 571 crore CCTV project.

He lost the 2025 Delhi assembly election from his seat.

== Member of Legislative Assembly ==
=== MLA first term (2013–2014) ===
In his first tenure as the Member of Legislative Assembly from Shakur Basti Assembly constituency, he served as Health & Family welfare, Gurudwara Elections and Industries Minister, in the First Kejriwal ministry from 28 December 2013 to 14 February 2014.

He is also said to be a close aide of Arvind Kejriwal.

=== MLA second term (2015–2020) ===
In his second term as MLA after winning the 2015 Assembly elections, he served in the Second Kejriwal ministry as Health & Family Welfare, Industries, Home, PWD, Power, Water, Transport, Urban Development and Irrigation & Flood control from 14 February to 13 February 2020.

In 2017, rebel MLA Kapil Mishra left AAP and joined BJP, he made accusations of bribery on Jain. In May 2017 Jain sued Mishra for criminal defamation. Kapil Mishra apologized for his accusations and defamation lawsuit was withdrawn. Later a lawyer used the accusation made by Mishra to file a complaint with the Delhi lokayukta for investigation, no evidence was submitted by the complainant. After the investigation, the Delhi Lokayukta did not find any evidence to support the accusations of bribery and fined the complainant a sum of ₹50,000.

=== MLA third term (2020–2025) ===
Jain was re-elected for the third time in a row from Shakur Basti Assembly Constituency with a margin of 7,592 votes in the 2020 Assembly elections. He served in third term as Delhi Health Minister in the Third Kejriwal ministry. He formerly served as Minister of Health & Family Welfare, Industries, Home, PWD, Power, Water, Urban Development and Irrigation & flood control, Government of NCT of Delhi.

In 2022, Jain was appointed in charge of the Assembly election in Himachal Pradesh.

Jain has been accused by the Enforcement Directorate of money laundering after CBI filed a case in 2017. Jain was questioned in 2018 after which there was no major progress in the case.

In early 2022, AAP leader Arvind Kejriwal stated that he had information from sources that government agencies were planning to arrest Jain just before the 2022 Punjab Legislative Assembly election. AAP won the Punjab elections. Jain had stated, "They (ED) are welcome to come whenever they want. Even before this, they have raided me twice but all has been in vain. This is all politics and they did it during the last Punjab elections also. ED, CBI all are welcome. I am ready, if they want to arrest me, they can arrest me." In May 2022, ED arrested him in the 2017 case. Delhi deputy chief minister Manish Sisodia condemned the arrest and called it a fake case.

On 10 October 2022, the Delhi High Court closed all ongoing legal proceedings against Satyendra Jain under the Benami Transaction (Prohibition) Amendment Act. The decision was made after Jain appealed for the same in the High Court in 2017. The said transactions were made between 2011 and March 2016. The laws under which Jain was charged came into effect in November 2016, so they did not apply in his case.

He was defeated in the 2025 Assembly elections by a margin of 20,998 votes to BJP candidate Karnail Singh.

=== Cabinet Minister, Delhi ===
He was a cabinet minister in the Third Kejriwal ministry and held the charge of below listed departments of the Government of Delhi.

- Home
- Health
- Public Works Department
- Power
- Water
- Industries
- Urban development
- Irrigation
- Flood Control
- Labour
- Employment

== Personal life ==
Jain lives with his family in Saraswati Vihar in North West Delhi, and formerly lived in a government bungalow in Civil lines. His father was a retired teacher who moved to Delhi after Jain's birth from his hometown Kirthal in Baghpat tehsil, in the state of Uttar Pradesh.

On 17 June 2020, Jain tested positive for COVID-19.

In June 2020, all Jain's departments were temporarily taken over by the Deputy C.M. Manish Sisodia, citing his health issues as he himself was battling the COVID-19 virus. However, Jain retained the status of a minister without any department.

Earlier, Jain travelled from one hospital to another and was keeping a close look on the circumstances and developments in the hospitals while treating COVID patients.

On 20 June 2020, he was administered plasma therapy at the hospital in Saket, and on 24 June it was reported that his condition had improved considerably. On 2 May 2021, his father died due to COVID-19.

== Electoral performance ==
Delhi Assembly elections, 2013: Shakur Basti
Party	Candidate	Votes	%	±%
AAP	Satyender Kumar Jain	40,232	42.30	
BJP	Shyam Lal Garg	33,170	34.87	−15.33
INC	Dr. S. C. Vats	18,799	19.76	−25.47
Independent	Jawahar Lal Luthra	1,321	1.39	
NOTA	None of the Above	583	0.61	
Majority		7,062	7.42	
Turnout		95,252	70.85	+12.52
AAP gain from BJP		Swing		

Delhi Assembly elections, 2015: Shakur Basti
Party	Candidate	Votes	%	±%
AAP	Satyender Kumar Jain	51,530	48.67	+6.37
BJP	S. C. Vats	48,397	45.71	+10.84
INC	Chaman Lal Sharma	4,812	4.54	−15.22
NOTA	None	438	0.41	
Majority		3,133	2.96	−4.46
Turnout		1,05,899	71.91	
AAP hold		Swing	+6.37	

Delhi Assembly elections, 2020: Shakur Basti
Party	Candidate	Votes	%	±%
AAP	Satyender Kumar Jain	51,165	51.60	+2.93
BJP	S. C. Vats	43,573	43.94	−1.77
INC	Dev Raj Arora	3,382	3.41	−1.13
NOTA	None of the above	641	0.65	+0.23
BSP	Asha Ram	289	0.29	+0.07
Majority		7,592	7.66	+4.70
Turnout		99,245	67.87	−4.03
AAP hold		Swing	+2.93	

=== 2025 ===
Delhi Assembly elections, 2025: Shakur Basti
Party	Candidate	Votes	%	±%
BJP	Karnail Singh	56,869	57.1	▲13.16
AAP	Satyendra Kumar Jain	35,871	36.0	▼15.60
INC	Satish Luthra	5,784	5.8	▲2.39
NOTA	None of the above	673	0.4	
Majority		20,998	21.2	▲13.54
Turnout		98,979	63.5	▼4.37
BJP gain from AAP		Swing		

State Legislative Assembly
Preceded by ?	Member of the Delhi Legislative Assembly from Shakur Basti Assembly constituency 2020–	Incumbent
