= Manish Sisodia =

Indian politician (born 1972)

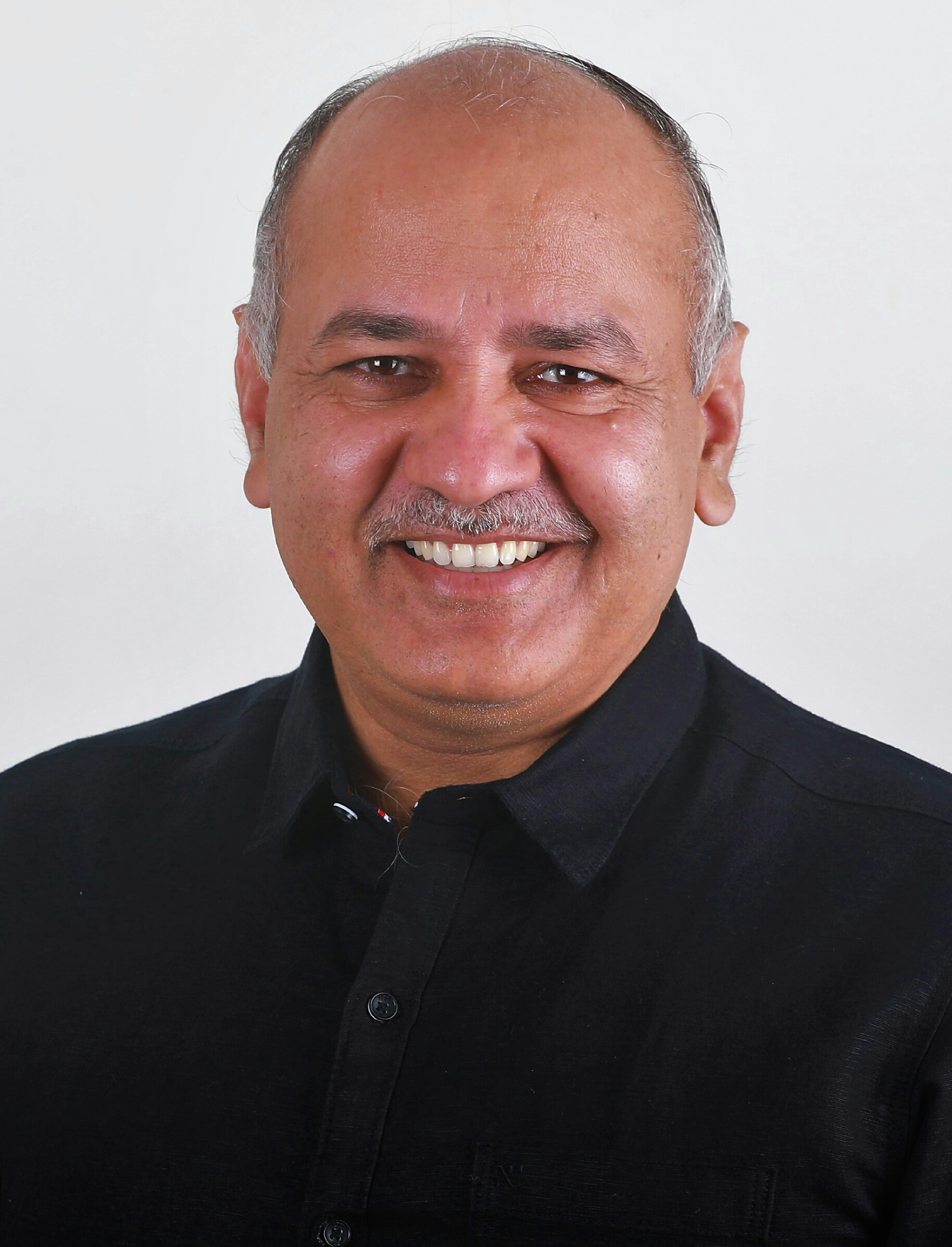
- Official portrait, 2020

1st Deputy Chief Minister of Delhi
- In office 14 February 2015 – 28 February 2023
- Lieutenant Governor: Najeeb Jung; Anil Baijal; Vinai Kumar Saxena
- Chief Minister: Arvind Kejriwal
- Preceded by: Office established
- Succeeded by: Parvesh Verma (2025)
Additional Ministries
In office 14 February 2015 – 28 February 2023
Ministry and Departments	Finance; Education; Labour; PWD; Tourism; Planning; Land & Building; Vigilance; Services; Art; Culture; Language
Preceded by	President's rule

Member of Delhi Legislative Assembly
- In office 10 February 2015 – 8 February 2025
- Preceded by: President's Rule
- Succeeded by: Ravinder Singh Negi
- Constituency: Patparganj
- In office 8 December 2013 – 10 February 2014
- Preceded by: Anil Kumar Choudhary
- Succeeded by: President's Rule
- Constituency: Patparganj

Personal details
- Born: 5 January 1972 (age 54) Hapur, Uttar Pradesh, India
- Party: Aam Aadmi Party
- Spouse: Seema Sisodia
- Children: 1
- Education: DJMC
- Alma mater: Bharatiya Vidya Bhavan
- Occupation: Politician; journalist

Manish Sisodia (born 5 January 1972) is an Indian politician, journalist and former social activist who served as the first Deputy Chief Minister of Delhi from 2015 to 2023. He represented the Patparganj constituency in the Delhi Legislative Assembly from 2015 to 2025 and had also represented the constituency from 2013 to 2014. He is one of the founding members of the Aam Aadmi Party (AAP) and a member of its National Executive Committee.

Sisodia was a cabinet minister in the Government of Delhi between December 2013 and February 2014 and continued to hold several cabinet positions after becoming the Deputy Chief Minister, including the portfolio of Education Minister through which he credited himself with reforming and overhauling the public education sector in Delhi.

He resigned from all cabinet positions following his arrest by the Central Bureau of Investigation (CBI), on corruption charges in a major liquor scam. There are counter-allegations against the Central Government and the ruling Bharatiya Janata Party of misusing investigative agencies such as the CBI and ED to target political opponents and Sisodia is one of several politicians with cases against them.

== Early life and career ==
Manish Sisodia was born in a Hindu Rajput family of Phagauta village in Hapur district of Uttar Pradesh. Born to a father who was a public-school teacher, he was enrolled into the government school in his village. Later, he commenced his career as a journalist after completing a diploma in journalism, awarded by Bharatiya Vidya Bhavan in 1993. Manish Sisodia also worked as radio jockey in FM radio station during his early career. He used to host several programs like "Zero Hour" for All India Radio in 1996 and then worked for Zee News as a reporter, news producer and news reader between 1997 and 2005.

== Activism ==
Sisodia's association with the Chief Minister of Delhi and AAP's founding chief Arvind Kejriwal goes back to their time together as leaders of the non-profit Parivartan, founded by the latter to take up cases of citizens who struggled to engage with the government. After formally quitting journalism, Sisodia along with Kejriwal founded Kabir, a non-profit that organised public hearings with government officials and people. He was one of the key members of the group that drafted the Right to Information Act.

Subsequently, Sisodia became a key participant in the Anna Hazare led India Against Corruption movement of 2011 that sought a Jan Lokpal bill. He was involved in drafting the first version of that proposed legislation and was jailed for his involvement in protests.

== Political career ==
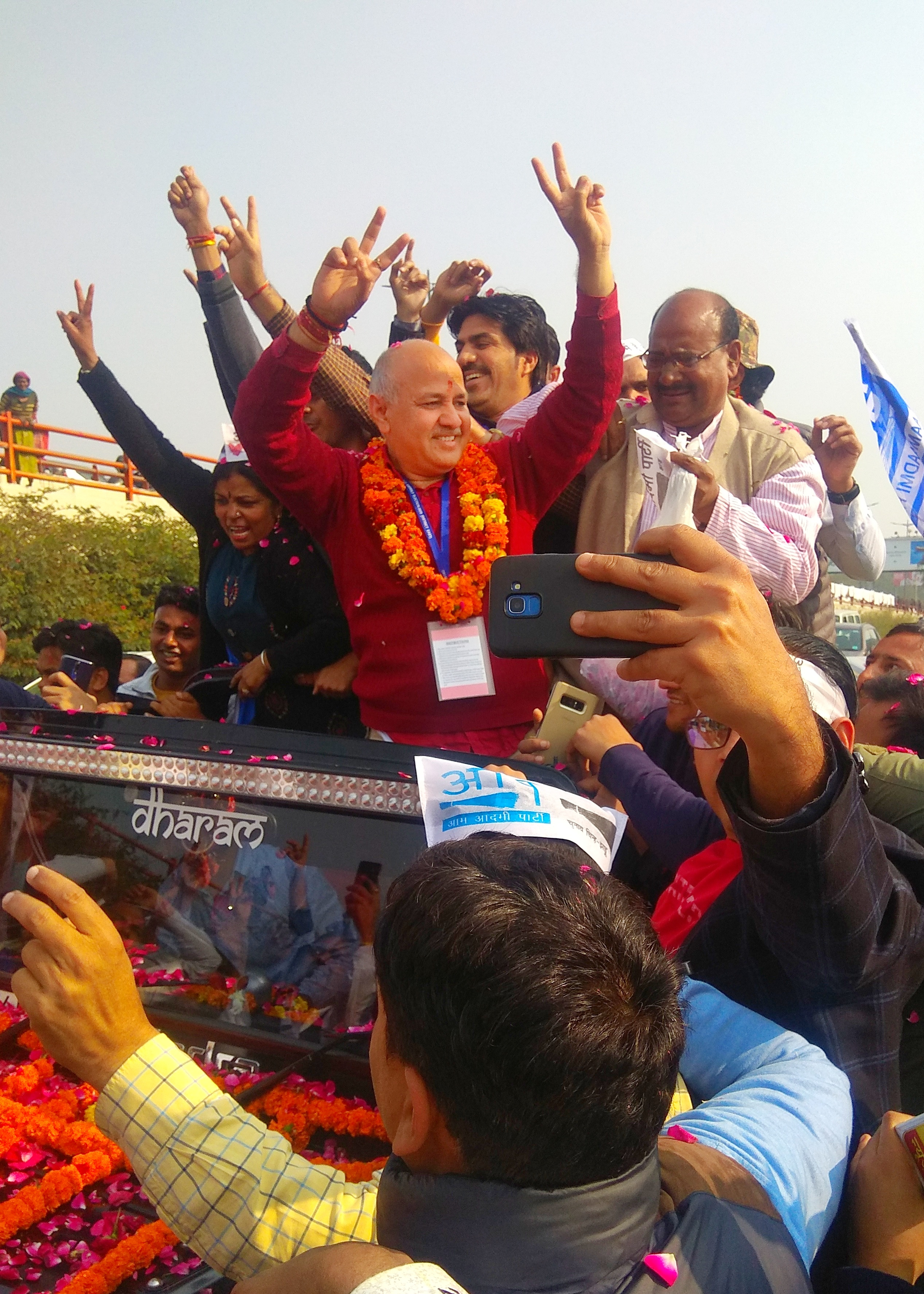
Manish Sisodia won the 2020 Delhi Vidhan Sabha election by defeating Ravi Negi in Patparganj constituency

Sisodia was one of the key founding members of the Aam Aadmi Party (AAP). He became a member of its Political Affairs Committee. He was elected as a Member of the Legislative Assembly in the December 2013 Delhi Assembly election, when he defeated Nakul Bhardwaj, a Bharatiya Janata Party candidate, by 11,476 votes in the Patparganj constituency of East Delhi. In the February 2015 Delhi Assembly election, which resulted in a landslide victory for AAP, he was again elected from Patparganj, defeating Vinod Kumar Binny of the Bharatiya Janata Party by over 28,761 votes. In 2020 Delhi Legislative Assembly election, he again defeated Ravinder Singh Negi, a BJP candidate by over 3000 votes. In 2025 Delhi Legislative Assembly election, he lost to Tarvinder Singh Marwah of Bharatiya Janata Party from Jangpura assembly constituency by 675 votes.

=== Cabinet Minister, Delhi ===
He was a cabinet minister in all the three Kejriwal ministries and held the charge of below listed departments of the Government of Delhi during the Third Kejriwal Ministry-

- Finance.
- Education.
- Tourism.
- PWD.
- Labour
- Planning.
- Land & Building.
- Vigilance.
- Services.
- Art.
- Culture.
- Language.
- home ministry.

He resigned from the cabinet on 28 February 2023, after being arrested by the Central Bureau of Investigation for the Delhi liquor policy scam.

== As Cabinet Minister ==
=== Education reforms ===
When the AAP came to power in Delhi, Sisodia decided to bring in reforms to the ailing public education system. One of the first decisions he took as Delhi's Finance Minister in 2015 was to double the funding for the public education program. Every year since then, the Delhi government has allocated a quarter of its total budget to education, making it the highest proportion in the country. One of the most visible hallmarks of these reforms is the reconstructed building infrastructure: modern classrooms equipped with tech-based teaching aids, and also football fields, field hockey turfs, auditoriums and science laboratories. Delhi also has parent-led School Management Committees (School Boards), creating accountability structures within the communities that the school serves. Delhi government has successfully conducted several mega PTMs (Parent Teacher Meetings) which provided a space for the teachers and parents to engage in meaningful conversations for the betterment of students.

Under Sisodia's leadership, many interventions happened inside the classrooms. Advanced teacher training modules that encourage educators to focus on learning outcomes had significantly bridged the learning deficit. The government had launched a statewide program, Mission Buniyaad, to improve the foundational learning outcomes of the students. Sisodia had experimented with new age curricula viz Happiness Curriculum and Entrepreneurship Mindset Curriculum and Deshbhakti Curriculum which instill values and skills in the students and prepare them to live a happy, meaningful and productive life. The curricula was implemented in all government and some private schools of Delhi to inculcate the right mindset among students by making them emotionally and professionally sound while becoming responsible citizens.

Manish Sisodia had also introduced a student entrepreneurship program "Business Blasters". The program empowered students to develop a job provider's mindset by setting up their own businesses for which each student was provided seed money of Rs 2000. It was a multi-component intervention focused on experiential learning that includes field projects, interviews, classroom activities and live interaction with entrepreneurs. In its first edition of the Business Blasters program 126 students made it to the final round and exhibited their businesses at Business Blasters Expo- 2022 held on 5 March 2022.

In 2018, he delivered the keynote address at the Harvard India Conference at the Harvard Kennedy School on the Government's Education and Healthcare reforms. In 2017, he presented the Delhi Education model at the Global Education conference in Moscow, in front of educationists from 70 countries.

In December 2021, Manish Sisodia presented Mindset Curricula (Happiness, Entrepreneurship and Deshbhakti) at RewirEd Summit in Dubai, to the education fraternity from all across the world. In May 2022, he shared the story of 'restoring the faith of Delhi people in the government school system' in the presence of ministers and public representatives from over 100 countries at the Education World Forum-2022 in London, UK.

In 2021, he supported students to cancel CBSE Board Exam 2020-21 of Class 10 amid rising COVID-19 cases.

In August 2022, his education policy received acclaim from The New York Times.

Sisodia has also written a book called 'Shiksha: My Experiments as an Education Minister', which chronicles the journey of education reforms in Delhi as being claimed by his party and has received wide acclaim for its practical insights on education transformation.

=== Higher and Technical Education Reforms ===
Transformative changes by Manish Sisodia in the field of Education are not just limited to school education. He had taken many initiatives in the field of Higher and Technical Education that includes establishing three innovative new state universities- Delhi Skill and Entrepreneurship University (DSEU) in 2020, Delhi Sports University (DSU) in 2021 and Delhi Teachers University in 2022. In addition to this, the number of seats in state universities have also been increased significantly to accommodate a larger population of students.

==== Allegations of Fund Misappropriation of Delhi University college ====
In 2020, Sisodia found himself in a controversy involving allegations of fund misappropriation at four Delhi University colleges. Sisodia's accusations were based on the preliminary observations of an independent audit initiated by the Delhi Government at seven DU colleges it funds. The audit's initial findings indicated that the four colleges— Deen Dayal Upadhyay (DDU) College, Keshav Mahavidyalaya, Bhagini Nivedita College, and Shaheed Sukhdev College of Business Studies —were misappropriating funds, leading to a public dispute between the Delhi Government and these institutions.

The issue arose amid claims from 12 DU colleges, all funded by the Delhi government, about a shortage of money that jeopardized their ability to pay salaries, as well as cover utility bills and other operational costs. These colleges had approached Sisodia, demanding additional funding, but Sisodia countered by stating that certain colleges were holding money in fixed deposits in an “illegal manner” and were refusing to pay staff despite having adequate funds. He claimed that the four colleges had misused government grants and kept the funds in fixed deposits.

The principals of the accused colleges, along with members of the Delhi University Principal Association (DUPA), strongly denied these allegations, they argued that the fixed deposits in question were derived from "Student's Society Fund," which is intended for student welfare, hostel upkeep, and placement drives. They explained that these funds could not legally be used for staff salaries, as it would constitute misappropriation. DUPA President and the principals of the implicated colleges claimed that Sisodia's allegations were unfounded and politically motivated. The colleges expressed their dire financial situation and stated that the allegations against them were unjustified and an attack on public-funded education institutions.

This controversy highlighted the strained relationship between the Delhi government and DU colleges, sparking debates about funding, accountability, and governance in public education. It also underscored the challenges faced by colleges in maintaining their operations amid financial constraints and political scrutiny. Following the three-month-long controversy, the Delhi Government subsequently sanctioned funds for salaries of employees.

=== Economic reforms ===
During Sisodia's tenure as the Finance Minister in Delhi, the government's budget had more than doubled in 7 years - from ₹30, 940 crores in 2014–15 to ₹ 75,800 crores in 2022–23. Such an increase was possible due to an increase in the tax base by ending the "Raid Raj" and plugging leaks. Sisodia had also started one of its kind Outcome Budget, which is one of the most comprehensive in India linking public spending to over 2,200 output indicators and 1,549 outcome indicators across 39 departments. This was considered as a revolutionary step in improving the political accountability of public finance. He was the only finance minister of any state to have presented eight consecutive budgets.

On 26 March 2022, he presented a budget of ₹75,800 crore in the Delhi Assembly. AAP leaders expected that the budget would create employment for 20 lakh people in Delhi in the upcoming five years.

== Political and social views ==
In his budget speech for 2016–17, Sisodia said that the aim of the government is not spending the allocated money but ensuring that every rupee spent makes a difference in the lives of the people. He has said that elections should be fought on the agendas of education and health and not on caste and religion.

At the World Education Conference in Moscow in 2018, Sisodia said that the real contribution to society is the building of a quality education system in the country and the task of education is to equip the students to address present-day challenges, including terrorism, pollution, corruption and gender discrimination. In 2019, he said that students should be enabled to become job providers rather than job seekers. He has also said that India needs an education system which ensures a high minimum quality of education to all its students and not just 5% students who can afford to pay for it.

== Corruption charges and arrest ==
In June 2022, a complaint was filed against Sisodia about the construction of schools and classrooms with the Delhi Government's Anti-Corruption Branch (ACB). In July 2022, the anti-corruption authority Delhi Lokayukta was also investigating.

In July 2022, Delhi Lieutenant Governor Vinai Kumar Saxena alleged, on the basis of a report written by government staff, that procedural lapses had occurred in the implementation of Delhi’s new excise policy and claimed that post-tender benefits were being extended to the licensees. CBI began investigating the case. In response, Delhi CM Arvind Kejriwal accused the Central government of misusing the CBI to "derail Delhi’s education and health revolution". On 22 August, Sisodia said that he had a recording (the evidence of which was never made available in public domain) of an offer from the BJP to drop the cases against him in return for Sisodia splitting AAP.

Sisodia was arrested on 26 February 2023 in relation to the Excise Scam by CBI. The FIR said that Sisodia, former Delhi Excise Commissioner Arava Gopi Krishna, and two other senior excise department officials were "instrumental in recommending and taking decisions pertaining to excise policy for the year 2021-22 without the approval of competent authority with an intention to extend undue favours to the licensee post tender".

Following his arrest, on 28 February 2023 Sisodia and his cabinet colleague, Satyendar Jain (who was also arrested on corruption charges), resigned from their posts from the Third Kejriwal ministry. AAP and Manish Sisodia have strongly denied these charges as being politically motivated.

In an FIR dated 14 March 2023, the Central Bureau of Investigation registered an additional case against Sisodia in connection with the Delhi government's Feedback Unit (FBU).

On 9 August 2024, the Supreme Court granted Sisodia bail on the condition that his passport be surrendered, and he reports weekly to the investigating officer. The top court also slammed the lower courts for deliberately delaying trial.

On 14 May 2026, the Delhi High Court Judge Swarana Kanta Sharma initiated criminal contempt proceedings against six AAP leaders, Arvind Kejriwal, Manish Sisodia, Sanjay Singh (AAP politician), Vinay Mishra, Durgesh Pathak and Saurabh Bharadwaj. She said that they had posted defamatory, contemptuous and vilifying things against her, calling it contemptuous of Court. On 19 May, the Delhi High Court issued notice to these leaders in the given criminal contempt proceedings.

== Awards and recognition ==
- 2016: listed among the 100 most influential Indians 2016 by The Indian Express
- 2017: awarded the "Finest Education Minister" award by The Indian Express
- 2019: awarded the Champions of Change Award for his exceptional work in education sector in Delhi
- 2021: honoured with the Mahatma award for promoting excellence in education; a global award to celebrate the work of social impact leaders and change-makers

== Elections Contested ==
Year	Constituency	Party	Votes	%	Opponent		Votes	%	Result	Margin
2013	Patparganj	AAP	50,211	41.53	BJP	Nakul Bhardwaj	38,735	32.03	Won	11,476
2015	Patparganj	AAP	75,477	53.58	BJP	Vinod Kumar Binny	46,716	33.18	Won	28,761
2020	Patparganj	AAP	70,163	49.33	BJP	Ravinder Singh Negi	66,956	47.06	Won	3,207
2025	Jangpura	AAP	38,859	44.65	BJP	Tarvinder Singh Marwah	39,534	45.46	Lost	675

Political offices
Preceded by Post Created	Succeeded by Post Vacant	
Deputy Chief Minister of Delhi; 28 December 2013 - 28 February 2023
State Legislative Assembly
Preceded by Anil Kumar Choudhary	Member of the Delhi Legislative Assembly from Patparganj Assembly constituency 2013–2025	Succeeded by Ravinder Singh Negi
Aam Aadmi Party political offices
New political party	Member of Political Affairs Committee of AAP; 2012–present	Incumbent
New political party	Member of National Executive Committee of AAP; 2012–present	Incumbent
