= Arvind Kejriwal =

Chief Minister of Delhi (2013–14; 2015–2024)

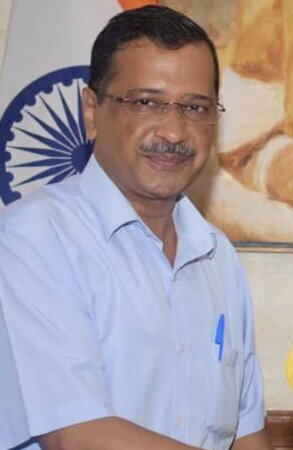
- Official portrait, 2022

7th Chief Minister of Delhi
- In office 14 February 2015 – 21 September 2024
- Lieutenant Governor: Vinai Kumar Saxena; Anil Baijal; Najeeb Jung
- Deputy: Manish Sisodia (until 28 February 2023)
- Cabinet: Kejriwal II; Kejriwal III
- Preceded by: President's rule
- Succeeded by: Atishi Marlena
- In office 28 December 2013 – 14 February 2014
- Lieutenant Governor: Najeeb Jung
- Cabinet: Kejriwal I
- Preceded by: Sheila Dikshit
- Succeeded by: President's rule

Member of Delhi Legislative Assembly
- In office 28 December 2013 – 8 February 2025
- Preceded by: Sheila Dikshit
- Succeeded by: Parvesh Verma
- Constituency: New Delhi

National Convener of the Aam Aadmi Party
- Incumbent
- Assumed office 26 November 2012
- Preceded by: Office established

Personal details
- Born: 16 August 1968 (age 58) Siwani, Haryana, India
- Party: Aam Aadmi Party
- Spouse: Sunita Kejriwal (m. 1995)
- Children: 2
- Education: IIT Kharagpur (BTech)
- Profession: Politician; activist; bureaucrat
- Known for: India Against Corruption; Jan Lokpal Bill
- Awards: Ramon Magsaysay Award

Arvind Kejriwal (Hindi pronunciation: [əɾʋɪn̪d̪ keːd͡ʒɾiːʋɑːl]; born 16 August 1968) is an Indian politician, activist and former bureaucrat, who served as the 7th Chief Minister of Delhi. He was the chief minister from 2013 to 2014 and from 2015 to 2024. He is also the national convener of the Aam Aadmi Party (AAP) since 2012. He represented the New Delhi constituency in the Delhi Legislative Assembly from 2015 to 2025, and previously from 2013 to 2014.

In 2006, Kejriwal was awarded the Ramon Magsaysay Award for his involvement in the Parivartan movement using right to information legislation in a campaign against government corruption. The same year, after resigning from government service, he founded the Public Cause Research Foundation to campaign for transparent governance. Before entering politics, Kejriwal had worked in the Indian Revenue Service. Prior to that, he was a mechanical engineer from IIT Kharagpur.

In 2012, he launched the AAP. In 2013, he assumed office as the Chief Minister of Delhi and resigned 49 days later over his inability to mobilise support for his proposed anti-corruption legislation. In the 2015 Delhi Legislative Assembly elections, the AAP registered an unprecedented majority. In subsequent 2020 elections, AAP re-emerged victorious and retained power in Delhi, following which, Kejriwal was sworn in as the Chief Minister of Delhi for the third time in a row. Outside Delhi, his party registered another major victory in 2022 Punjab Legislative Assembly election.

He was arrested on 21 March 2024 by the Enforcement Directorate on allegations of a liquor scam against the Aam Aadmi Party led Delhi Government. He became the first ever sitting chief minister in India to be arrested. His other party leaders, Satyendra Jain, Sanjay Singh and Manish Sisodia have also spent months to years in jail without bail, trial or conviction. The opposition alliance called the arrest weeks before the 2024 Indian general election, a case of fabrication and "match-fixing" by the BJP. Amnesty International said that financial and terrorism laws have been weaponised to go after political opponents. On 10 May, the Supreme Court ordered Kejriwal's release on interim bail until 1 June 2024, on account of campaigning for the election. Kejriwal surrendered at Tihar Jail after the expiry of his bail period on 2 June 2024. On 13 September 2024, he was granted bail by Supreme Court with certain conditions, the case still continues. On 17 September 2024, he resigned as Delhi Chief Minister saying he will only become CM again if he receives a public mandate.

His party suffered a heavy defeat in the 2025 Delhi Legislative Assembly election, with he himself losing his seat to Parvesh Verma by a margin of over 4,000 votes from the New Delhi Assembly constituency along with many other notable AAP members. On 27 February 2026, he was granted a clean chit in the excise policy case, along with 22 others, including Manish Sisodia.

== Early life and career ==
Kejriwal was born in a Haryanvi Agrawal-Baniya family in Siwani in the Bhiwani district of Haryana, India on 16 August 1968, the first of the three children of Gobind Ram Kejriwal and Gita Devi. His father was an electrical engineer who graduated from the Birla Institute of Technology, Mesra. Kejriwal spent most of his childhood in north Indian towns such as Sonipat, Ghaziabad and Hisar. He was educated at Campus School in Hisar and at Holy Child School at Sonipat. In 1985, he took the IIT-JEE exam and secured All India Rank (AIR) of 563. He graduated from Indian Institute of Technology Kharagpur, majoring in mechanical engineering.

He joined Tata Steel in 1989 and was posted in Jamshedpur, Bihar (now in Jharkhand). Kejriwal resigned in 1992, having taken leave of absence to study for the Civil Services Examination. He spent some time in Calcutta (present-day Kolkata), where he met Mother Teresa, and volunteered with The Missionaries of Charity and at the Ramakrishna Mission in North-East India and at Nehru Yuva Kendra.

=== IRS ===
Arvind Kejriwal joined the Indian Revenue Service (IRS) as an Assistant Commissioner of Income Tax in 1995, after qualifying through the Civil Services Examination. In February 2006, he resigned from his position as Joint Commissioner of Income Tax in New Delhi.

In 2012, Arvind Kejriwal founded the Aam Aadmi Party (AAP) to fight corruption and improve governance. The party made its mark in the 2013 Legislative Assembly election, but his first government lasted only 49 days. In 2015, Kejriwal returned with a decisive victory, focusing on education, healthcare, and welfare. He was re-elected in 2020, further cementing his leadership in Delhi. However, his defeat in 2025 in Delhi polls revealed his shortcomings. Since 2012, he has acted as the main national convenor of AAP.

== Activism ==
=== Parivartan and Kabir ===
In December 1999, while still in service with the Income Tax Department, Kejriwal, Manish Sisodia and others founded a movement named Parivartan (which means "change"), in the Sundar Nagar area of Delhi. A month later, in January 2000, Kejriwal took a sabbatical from work to focus on Parivartan.

Parivartan addressed citizens' grievances related to Public Distribution System (PDS), public works, social welfare schemes, income tax and electricity. It was not a registered NGO - it ran on individual donations, and was characterised as a jan andolan ("people's movement") by its members. Later, in 2005, Kejriwal and Manish Sisodia launched Kabir, a registered NGO named after the medieval philosopher Kabir. Like Parivartan, Kabir was also focused on RTI and participatory governance. However, unlike Parivartan, it accepted institutional donations. According to Kejriwal, Kabir was mainly run by Sisodia.

In 2000, Parivartan filed a public interest litigation (PIL) demanding transparency in public dealings of the Income Tax department, and also organised a satyagraha outside the Chief Commissioner's office. Kejriwal and other activists also stationed themselves outside the electricity department, asking visitors not to pay bribes and offered to help them in getting work done for free.

In 2001, the Delhi government enacted a state-level Right To Information (RTI) Act, which allowed the citizens to access government records for a small fee. Parivartan used RTI to help people get their work done in government departments without paying a bribe. In 2002, the group obtained official reports on 68 public works projects in the area, and performed a community-led audit to expose misappropriations worth ₹ 7 million in 64 of the projects. On 14 December 2002, Parivartan organised a Jan sunvai (public hearing), in which the citizens held public officials and leaders accountable for the lack of development in their locality.

In 2003 (and again in 2008), Parivartan exposed a PDS scam, in which ration shop dealers were siphoning off subsidised foodgrains in collusion with civic officials. In 2004, Parivartan used RTI applications to access communication between government agencies and the World Bank, regarding a project for privatisation of water supply. Kejriwal and other activists questioned the huge expenditure on the project and argued that it would hike water tariffs ten-fold, thus effectively cutting off the water supply to the city's poor. The project was stalled as a result of Parivartan's activism. Another campaign by Parivartan led to a court order that required private schools, which had received public land at discounted prices, to admit more than 700 poor kids without a fee.

Along with other social activists like Anna Hazare, Aruna Roy and Shekhar Singh, Kejriwal came to be recognised as an important contributor to the campaign for a national-level Right to Information Act (enacted in 2005). He resigned from his job in February 2006, and later that year, he was given the Ramon Magsaysay Award for Emergent Leadership, for his involvement with Parivartan. The award recognised him for activating the RTI movement at the grassroots and empowering New Delhi's poor citizens to fight corruption.

By 2012, Parivartan was largely inactive. Sundar Nagri, where the movement was concentrated, suffered from irregular water supply, unreliable PDS system and poorly done public works. Calling it "ephemeral and delusionary in nature", Kejriwal noted that Parivartan's success was limited, and the changes brought by it did not last long.

=== Public Cause Research Foundation ===
In December 2006, Kejriwal established the Public Cause Research Foundation in December 2006, together with Manish Sisodia and Abhinandan Sekhri. He donated his Ramon Magsaysay Award prize money as a seed fund. Besides the three founders, Prashant Bhushan and Kiran Bedi served as the Foundation's trustees. This new body paid the employees of Parivartan. Kejriwal used the RTI Act in corruption cases in many government departments including the Income Tax Department, the Municipal Corporation of Delhi, the Public Distribution System and the Delhi Electricity Board.

=== Jan Lokpal movement ===
In 2010, Kejriwal protested against corruption in the Commonwealth Games. He argued that the Central Vigilance Commission (CVC) did not have any powers to take any action against the guilty, while CBI was incapable of launching an unbiased investigation against the ministers who controlled it. He advocated appointment of public ombudsman - Lokpal at the Centre and Lokayuktas in states.

In 2011, Kejriwal joined several other activists, including Anna Hazare and Kiran Bedi, to form the India Against Corruption (IAC) group. The IAC demanded enactment of the Jan Lokpal Bill, which would result in a strong ombudsman. The campaign evolved into the 2011 Indian anti-corruption movement. In response to the campaign, the government's advisory body - the National Advisory Council - drafted a Lokpal Bill. However, the NAC's Bill was criticised by Kejriwal and other activists on the grounds that it did not have enough powers to take action against the prime minister, other corrupt officeholders, and the judiciary. The activists also criticised the procedure for the selection of Lokpal, the transparency clauses and the proposal to disallow the Lokpal from taking cognizance of public grievances.

Amid continuing protests, the Government constituted a committee to Draft a Jan Lokpal Bill. Kejriwal was one of the civil society representative members of this committee. However, he alleged that the IAC activists had an unequal position in the committee, and the government appointees kept ignoring their recommendations. The Government argued that the activists could not be allowed to blackmail the elected representatives through protests. Kejriwal retorted that democratically elected representatives could not be allowed to function like dictators, and asked for a public debate on the contentious issues.

The IAC activists intensified their protests, and Anna Hazare organised a hunger strike. Kejriwal and other activists were arrested for defying a police directive to give a written undertaking that they will not go to JP Park. Kejriwal attacked the government on this and said there was a need for a debate over police power to detain and release people at will. In August 2011, a settlement was reached between the Government and the activists.

Besides the government, the Jan Lokpal movement was also criticised by some citizens as 'undemocratic' on the grounds that the ombudsman had powers over elected representatives. Arundhati Roy claimed that the movement was not a people's movement; instead, it was funded by foreigners to influence policymaking in India. She pointed out that the Ford Foundation had funded the Emergent Leadership category of the Ramon Magsaysay Award, and also donated $397,000 to Kejriwal's NGO Kabir. Both Kejriwal and Ford Foundation termed the allegations as baseless, stating that the donations were made to support the RTI campaigns. Besides, several other Indian organisations had also received grants from the Ford Foundation. Kejriwal also denied the allegations that the movement was a plot against the ruling Congress by the RSS, or that it was an upper-caste conspiracy against the Dalits.

By January 2012, the Government had backtracked on its promise to implement a strong Jan Lokpal, resulting in another series of protests from Kejriwal and his fellow activists. These protests attracted lower participation compared to the 2011 protests. By mid-2012, Kejriwal had replaced Anna Hazare as the face of the remaining protestors. In January 2014, Kejriwal said that he will quit from the government if Jan Lokpal Bill is not passed. In 2015, during the second term of the AAP government in Delhi, the Jan Lokpal Bill was passed by the assembly awaiting the president's approval.

== National Convener of AAP ==
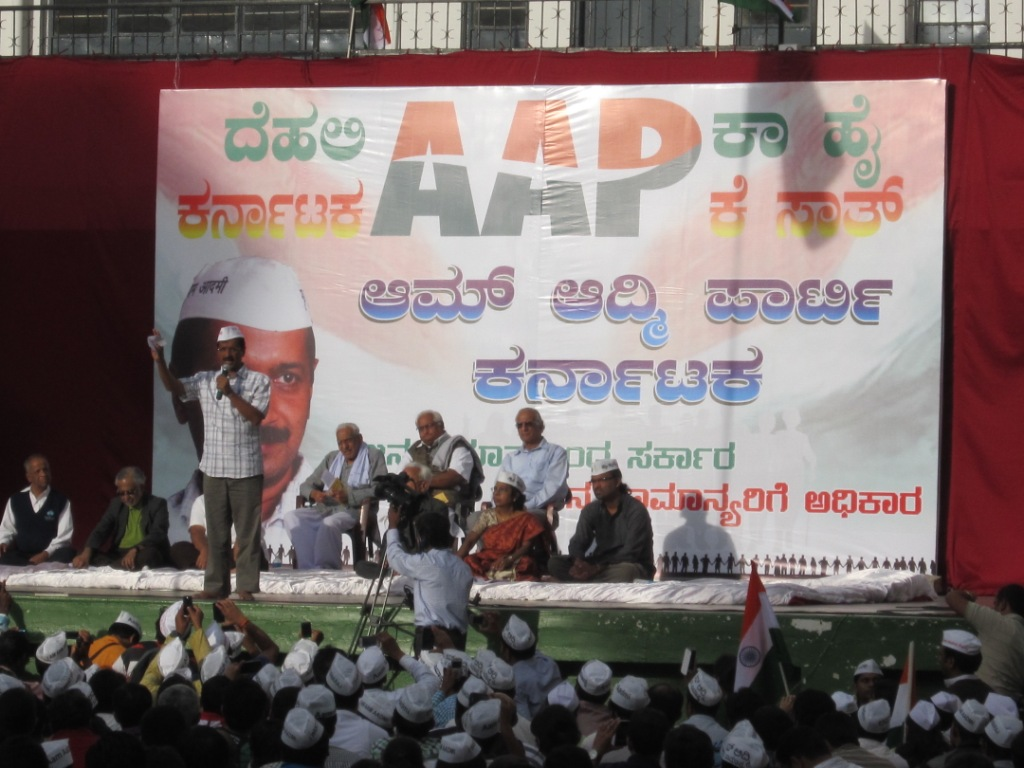
Kejriwal during the launch of AAP in Bangalore, in July 2013

One of the major criticisms directed at the Jan Lokpal activists was that they had no right to dictate terms to the elected representatives. As a result, Kejriwal and other activists decided to enter politics and contest elections. In November 2012, they formally launched the Aam Aadmi Party; Kejriwal was elected as the party's National Convener. The party name reflects the phrase Aam Aadmi, or "common man", whose interests Kejriwal proposed to represent. The establishment of AAP caused a rift between Kejriwal and Hazare.

AAP decided to contest the 2013 Delhi Legislative Assembly election, with Kejriwal contesting against the incumbent Chief Minister Sheila Dikshit. Kejriwal became the fifth most-mentioned Indian politician on social media channels in the run-up to the elections.

== Chief Minister of Delhi ==
=== First term ===
In the 2013, Delhi Legislative Assembly elections for all 70 seats, the Bharatiya Janata Party won 31 seats, followed by Aam Aadmi Party with 28 seats. Kejriwal defeated incumbent Chief Minister, Sheila Dikshit of the Indian National Congress (INC), in her constituency of New Delhi by a margin of 25,864 votes.

AAP formed a minority government in the hung assembly, (claiming support for the action gauged from opinion polls) with outside support from the eight INC MLAs, one Janata Dal MLA and one independent MLA. Kejriwal was sworn in as the second-youngest chief minister of Delhi on 28 December 2013, after Chaudhary Brahm Prakash who became chief minister at the age of 34. He was in charge of Delhi's home, power, planning, finance, services and vigilance ministries.

On 14 February 2014, he resigned as Chief Minister after failing to table the Jan Lokpal Bill in the Delhi Assembly. He recommended the dissolution of the Assembly. Kejriwal blamed the Indian National Congress and the Bharatiya Janata Party for stalling the anti-corruption legislation and linked it with the government's decision to register a First Information Report (FIR) against industrialist Mukesh Ambani, chairman and managing director of Reliance Industries. In April 2014 he said that he had made a mistake by resigning without publicly explaining the rationale behind his decision.

=== Second term ===
Kejriwal led Aam Aadmi Party won 67 of the 70 constituencies in the 2015 Delhi Assembly elections, leaving the BJP with three seats and the INC with none. In those elections, he was again elected from the New Delhi constituency, defeating Nupur Sharma by 31,583 votes. He took oath on 14 February 2015 as Delhi's chief minister for a second time at Ramlila Maidan. Since then his party has passed the Jan Lokpal Bill though with some differences.

There has been a long-running dispute between Kejriwal's office and that of the Lieutenant-Governor of Delhi during Kejriwal's second term as Chief Minister. Various issues have been involved, relating which office has ultimate responsibility for various aspects of government, including some significant public appointments. Manish Sisodia characterised it as "a battle between the selected and the elected" and indicated after a legal setback that the government was prepared to take the issues to the Supreme Court of India.

Mohalla Clinics that are primary health centres in Delhi was first set up by the Aam Aadmi Party government in 2015, and as of 2018, 187 such clinics have been set up across the state and served more than 2 million residents. The Government has kept a target of setting up 1000 such clinics in the city before 2020 Delhi Legislative Assembly Elections. Mohalla Clinics offer a basic package of essential health services including medicines, diagnostics, and consultation free of cost. These clinics serve as the first point of contact for the population, offer timely services, and reduce the load of referrals to secondary and tertiary health facilities in the state. Beginning in October 2019, New Delhi began rolling out free bus transit for women on the Delhi Transport Corporation, with women travelling for free when using pink tickets carrying a message from Kejriwal. He has been criticised for his controversial remarks over Biharis and "outsiders".

Shunglu Committee submitted a report to LG of Delhi raising questions over decisions of Government of Delhi.

=== Third term ===
AAP won 62 seats out of 70 in the 2020 Delhi Legislative Assembly election. He took oath on 16 February 2020 as Delhi's chief minister for a third time at Ramlila Maidan, equalling the record of Sheila Dikshit. On 21 March 2024, he became the first ever sitting chief minister in India to be arrested and imprisoned. After being released on bail by the Supreme Court, he vowed to resign from the post of chief minister on 15 September 2024 to campaign for the upcoming Delhi assembly elections. He resigned formally on 17 September 2024 and AAP named education minister Atishi Marlena as his replacement.

==== COVID-19 Mismanagement ====
During the COVID-19 pandemic in India in April 2021, Congress accused the Kejriwal government of spending significant amounts on publicity campaigns while failing to augment oxygen storage capacity and set up new oxygen plants in the National Capital Territory over the preceding year. A Central government-appointed committee criticised the Aam Aadmi Party (AAP)-led Delhi government for using state funds for advertisements that promoted Chief Minister Arvind Kejriwal and his party, allegedly violating Supreme Court guidelines.

In a reply to a Right to Information (RTI) query, it was revealed that funds were allocated in December 2020 to establish eight oxygen plants in Delhi, but only one plant was completed. The remaining funds were reportedly diverted to advertising expenditures. During the oxygen crisis in 2021, the central government increased oxygen allocations for Delhi, prompting Kejriwal to publicly thank the central government for providing 730 tons of oxygen. Critics accused Kejriwal of being "criminally liable" for the deaths of several patients in two Delhi hospitals due to oxygen shortages.

In July 2022, a Supreme Court-appointed audit panel concluded that the Delhi government had exaggerated its oxygen requirements by four times during the second wave of the COVID-19 pandemic.

==== Attack by BJP members ====
On 30 March 2022, the official residence of Delhi Chief Minister Arvind Kejriwal was attacked by a group of BJP supporters during a protest. Deputy Chief Minister Manish Sisodia alleged that the incident was part of a conspiracy to murder Kejriwal.

Following the incident, AAP MLA Saurabh Bhardwaj filed a petition in the Delhi High Court seeking the constitution of a Special Investigation Team (SIT) to investigate the attack. The petition claimed that the attack appeared to have been carried out with the "tacit complicity" of the Delhi Police. It alleged that the attackers breached the security cordon, damaged property including CCTV cameras, and vandalised the residence while police personnel failed to intervene.

On 31 March 2022, eight individuals involved in the attack were arrested. Charges under provisions related to obstructing public servants and damaging public property were filed. The Delhi High Court observed that the security arrangements at the Chief Minister's residence were inadequate to control the crowd and sought a status report from the Delhi Police on their investigation into the incident.

==== 2024 arrest ====
After skipping nine summons from the Enforcement Directorate (ED), Delhi Chief Minister Arvind Kejriwal was arrested on 21 March 2024 by the ED after the Delhi High Court rejected his anticipatory bail in connection with the Delhi liquor policy money laundering case. This made him the first sitting chief minister of India to be arrested (all others arrested before him had resigned from their post before being arrested). The opposition alliance called it a fabricated case and "match-fixing" before the 2024 general elections by the Bharatiya Janata Party led union government. The Delhi High Court dismissed Kejriwal's petition against his arrest and all his bail requests. The Supreme Court ultimately granted him interim bail from 10 May 2024 to 1 June 2024 on account of campaigning for the elections.

Following the end of his interim bail and failure to extend it on medical grounds, Kejriwal surrendered at Tihar Jail on 2 June. He was then sent to judicial custody until 5 June 2024. A Delhi court denied the plea filed by Kejriwal seeking a seven-day interim bail and extended judicial custody until 19 June and subsequently till 3 July 2024. On 20 June 2024 Kejriwal was granted bail by the trial court on a bail bond of 100,000 INR. However, his bail was put on hold before his release as ED appealed against it in the Delhi High Court. Kejriwal was then questioned for 3 days by the Central Bureau of Investigation (CBI) and arrested on 26 June 2024 from Tihar Jail in the same case. Subsequently, he was sent to judicial custody till 12 July.

On 12 July 2024, the Supreme Court granted interim bail to Kejriwal in money laundering case related to the alleged excise policy scam. However, he remained in jail due to the CBI arrest made in the previous month. On 5 September 2024, the Supreme court reserved an order on his bail in the CBI case. The reserved order was pronounced by the SC on 13 September 2024, granting him bail and ultimately leading to his release from Tihar Jail after five months. However he served in prison for more than 5 months.

==== 2026 ====
On 10 October 2026, Kejriwal and prominent leaders, including West Bengal CM Mamata Banerjee, Kerala CM Pinarayi Vijayan, and former Tripura CM Manik Sarkar, were detained by Delhi Police. They were attempting to join a protest organised by the Cockroach Janta Party in New Delhi's Jantar Mantar. The demonstration demanded the resignation of Chief election Commissioner Gyanesh Kumar following allegations regarding electoral roll revisions. Moreover, DSGMC approached the Delhi Police with the complaint against Kejriwal to disrupt the sancity of Gurudwara Bangla Sahib and spread misleading videos of the incident during 9 October anti CEC protests. However, he is released from detention at Delhi's Jaffarpur Kalan police station.

== Electoral history ==
=== Lok Sabha elections ===
Year	Constituency	Party	Votes	%	Opponent		Result	Margin
2014	Varanasi	AAP	209,238	20.30	BJP	Narendra Modi	Lost	371,784

=== Delhi Legislative Assembly elections ===
Year	Constituency	Party	Votes	%	Opponent		Result	Margin
2013	New Delhi	AAP	44,269	53.46	INC	Sheila Dikshit	Won	25,864
2015	New Delhi	AAP	57,213	64.34	BJP	Nupur Sharma	Won	31,583
2020	New Delhi	AAP	46,758	61.10	BJP	Sunil Kumar Yadav	Won	21,697
2025	New Delhi	AAP	25,999	42.18	BJP	Parvesh Verma	Lost	4,089

=== Views ===
Kejriwal discussed his views on corruption and the state of the Indian democracy in his book Swaraj. He advocates for a decentralisation of government and the involvement of the panchayat in local decisions and budgets. He claims that foreign multinational corporations have too much power in the decision-making process of the central government and that the politicians at the centre are not being held accountable for their actions and inaction after their election.

== Personal life ==
In 1995, Kejriwal married Sunita, a 1993-batch IRS officer. She took voluntary retirement in 2016 as Commissioner of Income Tax in the Income Tax Appellate Tribunal.

The couple have a daughter and a son. Kejriwal follows Hinduism. Kejriwal is a vegetarian and has been practising the Vipassanā meditation technique for many years. He has diabetes. In 2016, he underwent a surgery for his persistent cough problem.

Kejriwal considers himself an Ambedkarite and calls himself a 'devotee' of B. R. Ambedkar.

== Controversies ==
=== COVID-19 ===
In May 2021, Kejriwal called for the Indian central government to immediately stop air travel between India and Singapore, and develop "vaccine alternatives for children", due to "a new variant of coronavirus found in Singapore" which "is being said to be very dangerous for children". However, the Singapore Health Ministry stated that there was no known Singaporean variant of COVID-19; a recent report discussing the threat of COVID-19 to Singaporean children was discussing a variant of COVID-19 first detected in India: B.1.617. Many of the recent COVID-19 cases in Singapore were of B.1.617. Further, it said “There is no truth whatsoever in the assertions found within the reports”. The foreign minister of India, Subrahmanyam Jaishankar, and the foreign minister of Singapore, Vivian Balakrishnan, criticised Kejriwal's comment as "irresponsible" and counter-factual respectively.

In 2022, the Kejriwal government was accused by a central government panel of inflating the reported oxygen need of Delhi during the second wave of COVID-19 infections.

=== Lawsuits ===
Several defamation cases were filed against Arvind Kejriwal by his political opponents. In January 2014, Kejriwal released a list of most corrupt politicians that included several leaders across the political spectrum. Of the several on the list, Nitin Gadkari immediately filed a defamation suit against Kejriwal. Subsequently, Kejriwal apologised to union minister Nitin Gadkari for his unverified allegations and also sought apology from former minister Kapil Sibal.

In 2016, Kejriwal made allegations against Bikram Majithia, the then revenue minister of Punjab of involvement in drug trade for which Majithia filed a defamation case against him and two others from Aam Aadmi party. Kejriwal apologised to Majithia a couple of years later in March 2018.

Kejriwal made allegations against finance minister Arun Jaitley for irregularities in DDCA. Arun Jaitley filed a 10-crore defamation suit against Kejriwal. On 2 March 2016, Delhi High Court asked Chief Minister Arvind Kejriwal and suspended BJP MP Kirti Azad to file their written statements in a civil defamation suit of Rs 5 crores filed by DDCA for their alleged remarks against the cricket body regarding its functioning and finances. Following this, in April 2018 Arvind Kejriwal and three others from his party including Sanjay Singh, Raghav Chaddha and Ashutosh apologised to Arun Jaitley in a joint letter.

In his affidavit to Election Directorate before the second term elections in 2015 Kejriwal had declared that he has 10 criminal charges and 47 total charges against him.

In 2021, a Delhi court dismissed an assault case filed by a Delhi bureaucrat against Kejriwal and ten AAP MLAs and discharged them of all charges. The court noted that "no prima facie case" was made against them.

In February 2024, Kejriwal was involved in a defamation lawsuit and issued an apology to the Supreme Court of India for retweeting YouTuber Dhruv Rathee's 2018 video on BJP IT Cell. The Delhi high court, in its earlier ruling had stated that sharing "purportedly libelous" content would fall under defamation laws. On 11 March 2025, a Delhi court ordered an FIR against Arvind Kejriwal for allegedly misusing public money on large hoardings

=== Official residence renovations ===
In late April 2023, BJP made allegations that Kejriwal had misappropriated public funds for renovations of his residence in Delhi. An investigation was announced on 29 April 2023. CBI said that they started investigating money spent on renovating Chief Minister Arvind Kejriwal's house complex. Its Vigilance Department said it was pursuing misappropriation of funds and financial irregularities.

In 2022, a report by the Comptroller and Auditor General of India (CAG) highlighted significant cost escalations and procedural irregularities in the renovation of the official residence of then Delhi Chief Minister Arvind Kejriwal, located at 6 Flagstaff Road.According to the audit report, the renovation project was initially approved at an estimated cost of ₹7.91 crore but was ultimately completed at ₹33.66 crore, representing an increase of over 300 per cent.

=== Media fixing ===
In March 2014, in a leaked video of an interview with journalist Punya Prasun Bajpai, Kejriwal was seen giving instructions to Bajpai on promoting his interview by comparing his resignation to the sacrifice of Bhagat Singh and dropping a certain portion of interview on privatisation of industries which would portray him anti-middle class. Later, when the interview was telecasted it was found that Punya Prasun Bajpai had actually complied to the instructions and raised questions on his journalistic integrity and ethics. This controversy was called "media fixing" at that time.

== Delhi liquor scam ==
=== Initial case ===
The Delhi liquor policy case is an alleged scam, related with the introduction of Delhi's Excise Policy from 2021 to 2022. This policy allegedly intended to bring in private firms and enterprise companies into the retail liquor sectors. The allegations involve favouring the owners and shareholders of private sectors, waivers and reduction of licence fee and creation of numerous licences to all the new incoming enterprises, and bribery.

The matter was a major bone of contention between Aam Aadmi Party (AAP) and Bhartiya Janata Party (BJP) and continues to remain so. While the BJP has been calling this a glaring example of AAP's corruption, AAP has been calling it a falsely cooked political vendetta and an example of misuse of Central agencies like Central Bureau of Investigation (CBI) and Enforcement Directorate (ED).

Kejriwal was arrested in this case by ED on 21 March 2024 by ED. He became the first ever incumbent chief minister in India to be arrested while still holding the post. The ED also accused him of spying on their officials. ED had alleged him of skipping nine summons, before that. The Delhi High Court dismissed Chief Minister Arvind Kejriwal's petition against his arrest. He was granted bail by the Delhi High Court on 20 June 2024. His ministers, Satyendra Jain and Manish Sisodia were also sent to jail in this case. Manish Sisodia was granted bail by the Supreme Court on 9 August 2024. The opposition alliance called the arrest weeks before the 2024 Indian general election a case of fabrication and "match-fixing" by the BJP. Amnesty International said that financial and terrorism laws have been weaponised to go after political opponents while the BJP has denied that it had any political agenda to go after Kejriwal. On 20 June 2024, Kejriwal was released on bail after paying bail bond of one lakh Indian Rupees. His bail was put on hold before release as ED appealed against Kejriwal's bail. On 20 June, he was granted bail but his release was delayed due to an ED appeal. The CBI arrested him on 26 June, extending his custody to 12 July. On 12 July, the Supreme Court granted him interim bail for alleged Delhi liquor policy money laundering case, but he remains in jail in CBI case related to alleged Liquor policy scam. On 5 September 2024, the Supreme court upheld Delhi High Court's order of not granting bail to Kejriwal. On 13 September 2024, Kejriwal was granted bail by Supreme Court while imposing certain restrictions to his office of the Chief Minister.

On 26 February 2026, the Rouse Avenue Court discharged Kejriwal along with others in this case, noting the accusations were not supported by sufficient material. The Court discharged all 23 accused persons in the matter. They are Kuldeep Singh, Narender Singh, Vijay Nair, Abhishek Boinpally, Arun Pillai, Mootha Gautam, Sameer Mahendru, Manish Sisodia, Amandeep Singh Dhall, Arjun Pandey, Butchibabu Gorantla, Rajesh Joshi, Damodar Prasad Sharma, Prince Kumar, Arvind Kumar Singh, Chanpreet Singh, K Kavitha, Arvind Kejriwal, Durgesh Pathak, Amit Arora, Vinod Chauhan, Ashish Chand Mathur and Sarath Reddy. The Court said that the CBI failed to make out a prima facie case against the accused. It said Kejriwal was implicated without any cogent material. While pronouncing the verdict, the Court said that the CBI chargesheet running into thousands of pages included material which did not support any of the witness statements. The Court said there were “misleading averments” in the chargesheet. It also took strong exception to the repeated use of the phrase “South Group” by CBI, saying that selective adoption of a geographically defined label is plainly arbitrary and unwarranted.

CBI stated that crucial aspects of the case have not been considered by the court and moved to Delhi High Court challenging the discharge of Kejriwal, Sisodia and others. CBI has claimed that the excise policy was "manipulated" to facilitate some traders and the CBI was able to trace the money laundering. However, the trial court proceeded to discharge the accused without considering the collaborative material on record. It has claimed that this is a clear case of corruption, with meticulous evidence being collected by CBI. The Delhi High Court has issued notice on this plea. The High Court has also stayed the observations made by the trial court against CBI.

=== High Court appeal ===
The matter came in national limelight once again during hearing before Delhi High Court. The matter was heard by Justice Swarana Kanta Sharma, where Kejriwal and other accused moved application for recusal before her because she was attended RSS organised meetings. While Sharma initially rejected the application, citing judicial requirements. Later on 14 May 2026, Sharma initiated criminal contempt proceedings against 06 AAP leaders, Arvind Kejriwal, Manish Sisodia, Sanjay Singh, Vinay Mishra, Durgesh Pathak and Saurabh Bharadwaj. She said that they had posted defamatory, contemptuous and vilifying things against her, calling it contemptuous of Court. On 19 May, the Delhi High Court issued notice to these leaders in the given criminal contempt proceedings.

Later the Appeals were transferred to Justice Manoj Jain, where Kejriwal and other accused filed their Vakalatnama and decided to participate in the given case. Justice Jain issued notice to all of them to file their replies, saying that he would hear everyone in the process.

== In the media ==
An Insignificant Man is a 2017 Hindi/English Indian socio-political documentary co-produced and directed by Khushboo Ranka and Vinay Shukla and also co-produced by filmmaker Anand Gandhi. The documentary is about the rise of anti-corruption protests in India and the formation and rise to power of the Aam Aadmi Party and Arvind Kejriwal.

Kejriwal has appeared on the talk-shows and interviews of News channels. He spoofed himself on the third episode of the first season of The Viral Fever's Barely Speaking With Arnub, where actor Jitendra Kumar cosplayed as Kejriwal while sitting next to him in the latter half of the interview. He also appeared in stand-up comedian Kunal Kamra's YouTube interview series Shut Up Ya Kunal.

Satyagrah, a 2013 Bollywood drama, directed by Prakash Jha has the character played by Ajay Devgn which very distinctly features elements characteristics of Kejriwal and IAC movement. Though Prakash Jha said that Satyagraha is not about Anna Hazare and Arvind Kejriwal but AAP largely ignored his words.

Unbreakable, a 30-minute 2025 Indian Hindi-language socio-political documentary about AAP covers the arrest of Kejriwal and other key members during the 2024 Indian general election.

Adbhut Vyaktitva Arvind Kejriwal: Jeevan Yatra aur Rajneetik Sangharsh by Arvind Mohan Dwivedi in Hindi and Arvind Kejriwal & the Aam Aadmi Party (AAP): An Inside Look by Pran Kurup in English are two books written on Kejriwal.

== See also ==
- Fifth Legislative Assembly of Delhi
- 2017 Punjab Legislative Assembly election

Political offices
Preceded by Sheila Dikshit	Chief Minister of Delhi; 28 December 2013 – 14 February 2014	Vacant President's rule Title next held by Arvind Kejriwal
Vacant President's rule Title last held by Arvind Kejriwal	Chief Minister of Delhi; 14 February 2015–17 September 2024	Succeeded by Atishi Marlena Singh
Aam Aadmi Party political offices
New political party	National Convener of AAP; 2012 –	Incumbent
New political party	Member of Political Affairs Committee of AAP ? – present	Incumbent
New political party	Member of National Executive Committee of AAP ? – present	Incumbent
State Legislative Assembly
Preceded by Sheila Dikshit	Member of the Delhi Legislative Assembly from New Delhi Assembly constituency 2013–2025	Succeeded by Parvesh Verma
