= List of by-elections to the Uttar Pradesh Legislative Assembly =

The following is a list of by-elections held for the Uttar Pradesh Legislative Assembly, India, since its formation in 1947.

== 17th Assembly ==
=== 2017 ===
S.No	Date	Constituency	MLA before election	Party before election	Elected MLA	Party after election
207	21 December 2017	Sikandra	Mathura Prasad Pal	Bharatiya Janata Party	Ajit Singh Pal	Bharatiya Janata Party

=== 2018 ===
S.No	Date	Constituency	MLA before election	Party before election	Elected MLA	Party after election
1	28 May 2018	Noorpur	Lokendra Singh	Bharatiya Janata Party	Naim Ul Hasan	Samajwadi Party

=== 2019 ===
S.No	Date	Constituency	MLA before election	Party before election	Elected MLA	Party after election
1	29 April 2019	Nighasan	Patel Ramkumar Verma	Bharatiya Janata Party	Shashank Verma	Bharatiya Janata Party
2	19 May 2019	Agra North	Jagan Prasad Garg	Bharatiya Janata Party	Purshottam Khandelwal	Bharatiya Janata Party
3	23 September 2019	Hamirpur	Ashok Kumar Singh Chandel	Bharatiya Janata Party	Yuvraj Singh	Bharatiya Janata Party
4	21 October 2019	Gangoh	Pradeep Choudhary	Bharatiya Janata Party	Kirat Singh	Bharatiya Janata Party
5	21 October 2019	Iglas	Rajvir Singh Diler	Bharatiya Janata Party	Rajkumar Sahyogi	Bharatiya Janata Party
6	21 October 2019	Lucknow Cantt	Dr. Rita Bahuguna Joshi	Bharatiya Janata Party	Suresh Chandra Tiwari	Bharatiya Janata Party
7	21 October 2019	Govindnagar	Satyadev Pachauri	Bharatiya Janata Party	Surendra Maithani	Bharatiya Janata Party
8	21 October 2019	Manikpur	R. K. Singh Patel	Bharatiya Janata Party	Aanand Shukla	Bharatiya Janata Party
9	21 October 2019	Balha	Akshaibar Lal	Bharatiya Janata Party	Saroj Sonkar	Bharatiya Janata Party
10	21 October 2019	Ghosi	Phagu Chauhan	Bharatiya Janata Party	Vijay Rajbhar	Bharatiya Janata Party
11	21 October 2019	Zaidpur	Upendra Singh Rawat	Bharatiya Janata Party	Gaurav Kumar	Samajwadi Party
12	21 October 2019	Rampur	[Mohammad Azam Khan	Samajwadi Party	Dr. Tazeen Fatma	Samajwadi Party
13	21 October 2019	Jalalpur	Ritesh Pandey	Bahujan Samaj Party	Subhash Rai	Samajwadi Party
14	21 October 2019	Pratapgarh	Sangam Lal Gupta	Apna Dal (Sonelal)	Rajkumar Pal	Apna Dal (Sonelal)

=== 2020 ===
S.No	Date	Constituency	MLA before election	Party before election	Elected MLA	Party after election
1	3 November 2020	Naugawan Sadat	Chetan Chauhan	Bharatiya Janata Party	Sangeeta Chauhan	Bharatiya Janata Party
2	3 November 2020	Bulandshahr	Virendra Singh Sirohi	Bharatiya Janata Party	Usha Sirohi	Bharatiya Janata Party
3	3 November 2020	Tundla	S. P. Singh Baghel	Bharatiya Janata Party	Prempal Singh Dhangar	Bharatiya Janata Party
4	3 November 2020	Bangarmau	Kuldeep Singh Sengar	Bharatiya Janata Party	Shrikant Katiyar	Bharatiya Janata Party
5	3 November 2020	Ghatampur	Kamal Rani Varun	Bharatiya Janata Party	Upendra Nath Paswan	Bharatiya Janata Party
6	3 November 2020	Deoria	Janmejay Singh	Bharatiya Janata Party	Satyaprakash Mani Tripathi	Bharatiya Janata Party
7	3 November 2020	Malhani	Parasnath Yadav	Samajwadi Party	Lucky Yadav	Samajwadi Party

== 18th Assembly ==
=== 2022 ===
Date	S.No	Constituency	MLA before election	Party before election	Elected MLA	Party after election
3 November 2022	139	Gola Gokrannath	Arvind Giri	Bharatiya Janata Party	Aman Giri	Bharatiya Janata Party
5 December 2022	37	Rampur	Azam Khan	Samajwadi Party	Akash Saxena	Bharatiya Janata Party
5 December 2022	15	Khatauli	Vikram Singh Saini	Bharatiya Janata Party	Madan Kasana	Rashtriya Lok Dal

=== 2023 ===
Date	S.No	Constituency	MLA before election	Party before election	Elected MLA	Party after election
10 May 2023	34	Suar	Abdullah Azam Khan	Samajwadi Party	Shafeek Ahmed Ansari	Apna Dal (Sonelal)
10 May 2023	395	Chhanbey	Rahul Prakash Kol	Apna Dal (Sonelal)	Rinki Kol	Apna Dal (Sonelal)
5 September 2023	354	Ghosi	Dara Singh Chauhan	Samajwadi Party	Sudhakar Singh	Samajwadi Party

=== 2024 ===
Date	Constituency		Previous MLA		Reason	Elected MLA	
13 May 2024	136	Dadraul	Manvendra Singh	Bharatiya Janata Party	Died on 5 January 2024	Arvind Kumar Singh	Bharatiya Janata Party
20 May 2024	173	Lucknow East	Ashutosh Tandon	Bharatiya Janata Party	Died on 9 November 2023	O. P. Srivastava	Bharatiya Janata Party
25 May 2024	292	Gainsari	Shiv Pratap Yadav	Samajwadi Party	Died on 28 January 2024	Rakesh Kumar Yadav	Samajwadi Party
1 June 2024	403	Duddhi	Ramdular Gaur	Bharatiya Janata Party	Disqualified on 15 December 2023	Vijay Singh Gond	Samajwadi Party
20 November 2024	16	Meerapur	Chandan Chauhan	Rashtriya Lok Dal	Elected to Lok Sabha on 4 June 2024	Mithlesh Pal	Rashtriya Lok Dal
20 November 2024	29	Kundarki	Ziaur Rahman Barq	Samajwadi Party	Elected to Lok Sabha on 4 June 2024	Ramveer Singh	Bharatiya Janata Party
20 November 2024	56	Ghaziabad	Atul Garg	Bharatiya Janata Party	Elected to Lok Sabha on 4 June 2024	Sanjeev Sharma	Bharatiya Janata Party
20 November 2024	71	Khair	Anoop Pradhan	Bharatiya Janata Party	Elected to Lok Sabha on 4 June 2024	Surender Diler	Bharatiya Janata Party
20 November 2024	110	Karhal	Akhilesh Yadav	Samajwadi Party	Elected to Lok Sabha on 4 June 2024	Tej Pratap Singh Yadav	Samajwadi Party
20 November 2024	213	Sishamau	Haji Irfan Solanki	Samajwadi Party	Disqualified on 7 June 2024	Naseem Solanki	Samajwadi Party
20 November 2024	256	Phulpur	Praveen Patel	Bharatiya Janata Party	Elected to Lok Sabha on 4 June 2024	Deepak Patel	Bharatiya Janata Party
20 November 2024	277	Katehari	Lalji Verma	Samajwadi Party	Elected to Lok Sabha on 4 June 2024	Dharmraj Nishad	Bharatiya Janata Party
20 November 2024	397	Majhawan	Vinod Kumar Bind	NISHAD Party	Elected to Lok Sabha on 4 June 2024	Suchismita Maurya	Bharatiya Janata Party

=== 2025 ===
Date	Constituency		Previous MLA		Reason	Elected MLA	
5 February 2025	273	Milkipur	Awadhesh Prasad	Samajwadi Party	Resigned on 12 June 2024	Chandrabhanu Paswan	Bharatiya Janata Party
