= Harinarayan Rajbhar =

Indian politician

Member of Parliament, Lok Sabha
- In office 2014–2019
- Preceded by: Dara Singh Chauhan
- Succeeded by: Atul Rai
- Constituency: Ghosi

Minister of state for Prison, Minor Irrigation & Rural Development Government of Uttar Pradesh
- In office 27 October 1997 – 8 March 2002
- Chief Minister: Kalyan Singh; Ram Prakash Gupta; Rajnath Singh

Member of Uttar Pradesh Legislative Assembly
- In office 1996–2002
- Preceded by: Shardanand Anchal
- Succeeded by: Shardanand Anchal
- Constituency: Belthara Road (formerly Siar)
- In office 1991–1992
- Preceded by: Shardanand Anchal
- Succeeded by: Shardanand Anchal
- Constituency: Belthara Road (formerly Siar)

Personal details
- Born: 1 January 1950 (age 76) Tangunia, Ballia district, Uttar Pradesh
- Died: 12 April 2026 (aged 76) Lucknow, Uttar Pradesh, India
- Party: Bharatiya Janata Party
- Spouse: Mevati Devi (m. 1968)
- Children: 3 sons, 5 daughters
- Parents: Bhagirathi Rajbhar (father); Kabutri (mother)
- Profession: Politician

Harinarayan Rajbhar (born 1 January 1950) was the Member of Parliament of India from Ghosi (Lok Sabha constituency). He defeated Bahujan Samaj Party's Dara Singh Chauhan in the general election of 2014.

This was the first time that BJP had won the general election from Ghosi constituency.

After his victory, many BSP leaders joined BJP in this area.

== Early life and education ==
Harinarayan Rajbhar was born on 1 January 1950 to Shri Bhagirathi and Smt. Kabutri. He was born in Tangunia, a village in Ballia district of Uttar Pradesh. He completed his education up to intermediate level.

Rajbhar is married to Mevati Devi.

== Political career ==
- 1991 – 1992 and 1996 – 2002: Member, Uttar Pradesh Legislative Assembly (two terms)
- 1997 – 2002: Minister of State for Prison, Minor Irrigation and Rural Development, U.P. Government
- May 2014: Elected to 16th Lok Sabha
- 1 Sep. 2014 - 2019: Member, Standing Committee on Science & Technology, Environment & Forests; Member, Consultative Committee, Ministry of Chemicals and Fertilizers
