= Balipur, Uttar Pradesh =

Balipur
- village
- Location in Uttar Pradesh, India Balipur (India)
- Coordinates: 25.85°N 83.78°E
- Country: India
- State: Uttar Pradesh

Government
  - Body: Gram panchayat

Languages
  - Official: Hindi
- Time zone: UTC+5:30 (IST)
- Vehicle registration: UP
- Lok Sabha constituency: Ghosi
- Vidhan Sabha constituency: Rasra
- Website: up.gov.in

Balipur is a village in Gram Panchayat Kurem, Ballia district in Uttar Pradesh, India.
