= Ghosi Lok Sabha constituency =

Constituency of the Indian parliament in Uttar Pradesh

Coordinates: 26.12°N 83.55°E

Ghosi UP-70
- Lok Sabha constituency
- Interactive Map Outlining Ghosi Lok Sabha constituency

Constituency details
- Country: India
- Region: North India
- State: Uttar Pradesh
- Assembly constituencies: Madhuban; Ghosi; Muhammadabad-Gohna; Mau; Rasara
- Established: 1957
- Reservation: None

Member of Parliament
- 18th Lok Sabha
- Incumbent Rajeev Rai
- Party: Samajwadi Party
- Elected year: 2024

Ghosi Lok Sabha constituency is one of the 80 Lok Sabha (parliamentary) constituencies in Uttar Pradesh state in northern India.

== Assembly segments ==
No	Name	District	Member	Party	2024 Lead
353	Madhuban	Mau	Ramvilas Chauhan	BJP	SP
354	Ghosi	Mau	Vacant	Vacant	SP
355	Muhammadabad-Gohna (SC)	Mau	Rajendra Kumar	SP	SP
356	Mau	Mau	Abbas Ansari	SBSP	SP
358	Rasara	Ballia	Vacant	Vacant	SP

== Members of Parliament ==
Year	Member	Party
1957	Umrao Singh	Indian National Congress
1962	Jai Bahadur Singh	Communist Party of India
1967	Jai Bahadur Singh	Communist Party of India
1968^	Jharkhande Rai	Communist Party of India
1971	Jharkhande Rai	Communist Party of India
1977	Shiv Ram Rai	Janata Party
1980	Jharkhande Rai	Communist Party of India
1984	Rajkumar Rai	Indian National Congress
1989	Kalpnath Rai	Indian National Congress
1991	Kalpnath Rai	Indian National Congress
1996	Kalpnath Rai	Independent
1998	Kalpnath Rai	Samata Party
1999	Bal Krishna Chauhan	Bahujan Samaj Party
2004	Chandradeo Prasad Rajbhar	Samajwadi Party
2009	Dara Singh Chauhan	Bahujan Samaj Party
2014	Harinarayan Rajbhar	Bharatiya Janata Party
2019	Atul Rai	Bahujan Samaj Party
2024	Rajeev Rai	Samajwadi Party

^By-poll

== Election results ==
=== 2024 ===
2024 Indian general elections: Ghosi
Party	Candidate	Votes	%	±%
SP	Rajeev Rai	503,131	43.73	▲43.73
SBSP	Arvind Rajbhar	340,188	29.57	▲26.07
BSP	Balkrishna Chauhan	209,404	18.20	▼32.10
Majority		1,62,943	14.16	▲3.42
Turnout		1,150,590	55.21	▼2.10
SP gain from BSP		Swing		

=== 2019 ===
2019 Indian general elections: Ghosi
Party	Candidate	Votes	%	±%
BSP	Atul Rai	573,829	50.30	
BJP	Harinarayan Rajbhar	451,261	39.56	
INC	Balkrishna Chouhan	23,812	2.09	
CPI	Atul Kumar Anjaan	14,644	1.28	
Majority		122,568	10.74	
Turnout		1,141,480	57.31	
BSP gain from BJP		Swing		

=== 2014 ===
2014 Indian general elections: Ghosi
Party	Candidate	Votes	%	±%
BJP	Harinarayan Rajbhar	379,797	36.52	+24.07
BSP	Dara Singh Chauhan	233,782	22.48	−6.33
QED	Mukhtar Ansari	166,436	16.01	
SP	Rajeev Kumar Rai	165,887	15.95	−4.90
INC	Rashtra Kunwar Singh	19,315	1.86	−17.76
CPI	Atul Kumar Singh Anjaan	18,162	1.75	−1.11
Majority		146,015	14.04	
Turnout		1,039,830	54.99	
BJP gain from BSP		Swing		

== See also ==
- Mau district
- List of constituencies of the Lok Sabha
