= R. K. Mathur =

1st Lieutenant Governor of Ladakh

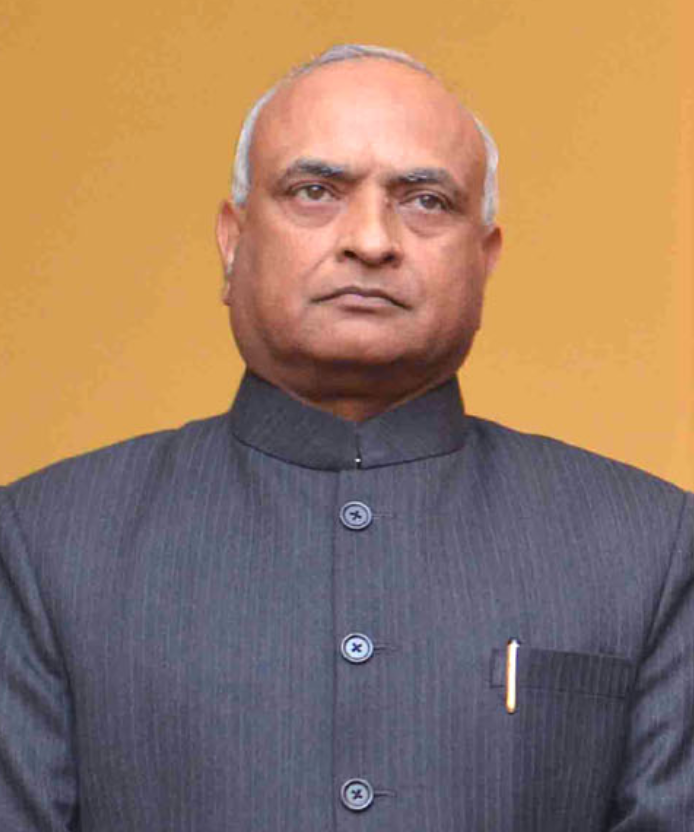
- Official Portrait, 2019

1st Lieutenant Governor of Ladakh
- In office 31 October 2019 - 12 February 2023
- President: Ram Nath Kovind; Droupadi Murmu
- Preceded by: position created
- Succeeded by: B. D. Mishra

8th Chief Information Commissioner of India
- In office 4 January 2016 – 24 November 2018
- Preceded by: Vijai Sharma
- Succeeded by: Sudhir Bhargava

Defence Secretary of India
- In office 25 May 2013 – 24 May 2015
- President: Pranab Mukherjee
- Preceded by: Shashi Kant Sharma
- Succeeded by: G. Mohan Kumar

Defence Production Secretary of India
- In office 1 October 2012 – 24 May 2013
- Preceded by: Shekhar Aggarwal
- Succeeded by: G.C. Pati

Micro, Small and Medium Enterprises Secretary of India
- In office 9 November 2011 – 30 September 2012

Chief Secretary of Tripura
- In office 22 December 2003 – 22 October 2006

Personal details
- Born: Radha Krishna Mathur; 25 November 1953 (age 72) Uttar Pradesh, India
- Spouse: Poonam Mathur (m. 1980)
- Children: Purvi Mathur, Prasun Mathur
- Education: IIT Kanpur; IIT Delhi; International Center for Promotion of Enterprises
- Occupation: Retired IAS officer

Radha Krishna Mathur (born 25 November 1953) is a retired IAS officer from the 1977 batch of Tripura cadre who served as the 1st Lieutenant Governor of Ladakh from 2019 to 2023. Before that he served as the Chief Information Commissioner of India. Mathur had retired as the India's Defence Secretary, two years after being appointed to the post on 25 May 2013. He was also the Defence Production Secretary of India, Micro, Small and Medium Enterprises Secretary of India and the Chief Secretary of Tripura.

== Education ==
Mathur is a Bachelor of Technology in mechanical engineering from IIT Kanpur, Master of Technology in Industrial Engineering from IIT Delhi. He also holds an MBA degree from International Center for Promotion of Enterprises (ICPE), Ljubljana, Slovenia.

== Career ==
=== As an IAS officer ===
Apart from serving as the Union Defence Secretary, RK Mathur served in various key positions for both Union and Tripura governments, like as the Chief Secretary of Tripura, Principal Secretary (Finance), Principal Secretary (Agriculture), Principal Secretary (Rural Development), Resident Commissioner of Tripura, Commissioner of Revenue, Commissioner of Panchayats, CEO of Tripura Tribal Areas Autonomous District Council, and as the District Magistrate and Collector of West Tripura district in the Tripura Government, and as the Union Defence Production Secretary, Union Micro, Small and Medium Enterprises Secretary, Special Secretary in Ministry of Defence, Development Commissioner in Ministry of Textiles, and as the Chief Enforcement Officer in Ministry of Textiles in the Union Government.

Mathur also served as the Private Secretary, on separate occasions, to Ministers of External Affairs and Information and Broadcasting.

==== Chief Secretary of Tripura ====
RK Mathur was appointed the Chief Secretary of Tripura by the Chief Minister of Tripura in December 2003, he assumed the office of the Chief Secretary of the state on 22 December 2003 and demitted it on 22 October 2006, serving as the state's top bureaucrat for almost three years.

==== Micro, Small and Medium Enterprises Secretary ====
Mathur was appointed the Union Micro, Small and Medium Enterprises Secretary by the Appointments Committee of the Cabinet (ACC) in November 2011, he assumed the office on 9 November 2011 and demitted it on 30 September 2012.

==== Defence Production Secretary ====
Mathur was appointed the Union Defence Production Secretary by the Appointments Committee of the Cabinet (ACC) in September 2012, he assumed the office on 1 October 2012 and demitted it on 24 May 2013.

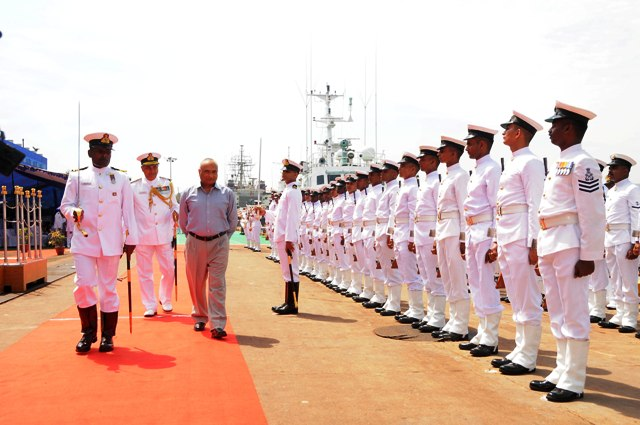
Radha Krishna Mathur, as Defence Secretary, inspecting the Guard of Honour at the commissioning of ICGS Rajveer.

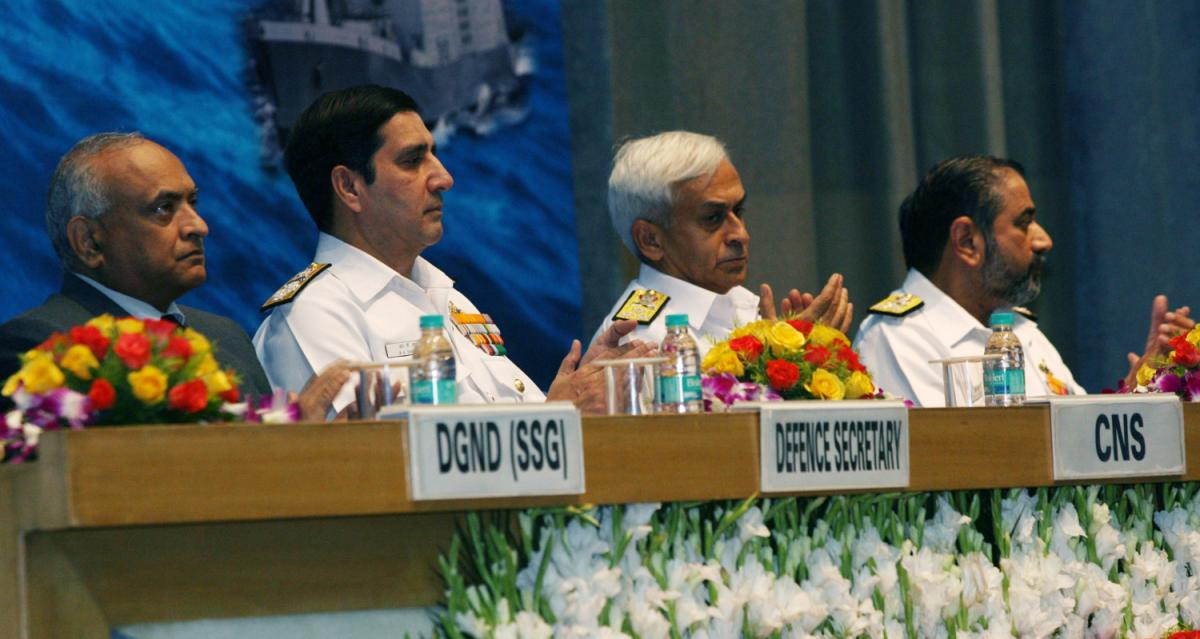
Radha Krishna Mathur (extreme-left) with the Chief of the Naval Staff Admiral Robin K. Dhowan (center-right) during the Golden Jubilee celebration of the Directorate of Naval Design (DND).

==== Defence Secretary ====
Mathur was appointed the Union Defence Secretary by the Appointments Committee of the Cabinet (ACC) in May 2013 for a fixed tenure of two years. He assumed the office of Defence Secretary on 25 May 2013 and demitted it and simultaneously superannuated from the service on 24 May 2015.

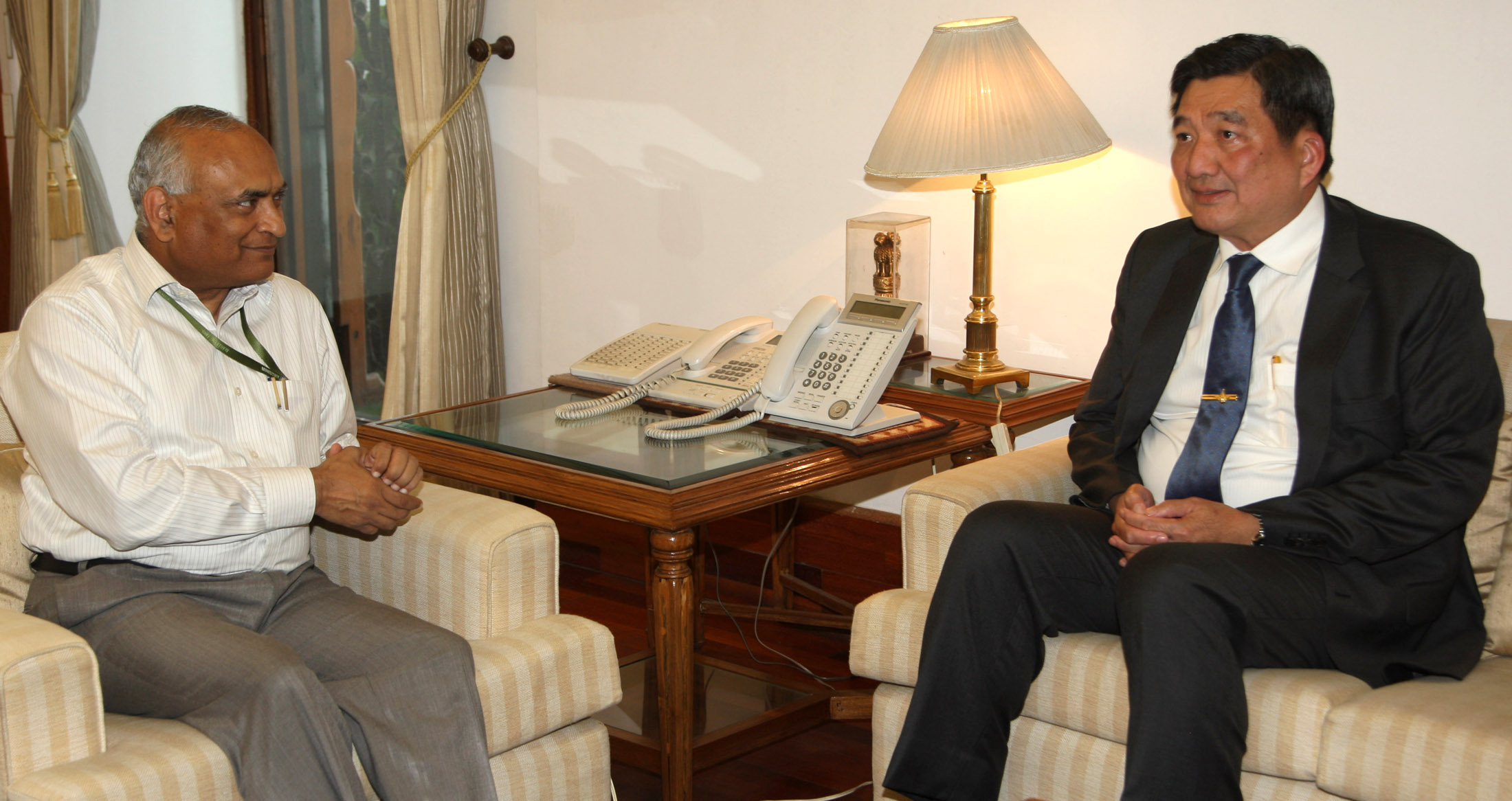

=== Chief Information Commissioner ===
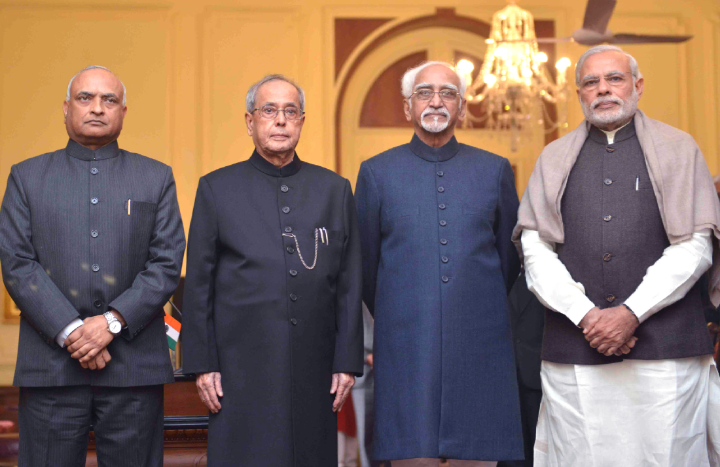
Swearing-in ceremony of R.K. Mathur as Chief Information Commissioner, in New Delhi

RK Mathur was appointed the Chief Information Commissioner of India (CIC), heading the Central Information Commission (CIC), by the Appointments Committee of the Cabinet (ACC) on 18 December 2015. He took oath as the Chief Information Commissioner on 5 January 2016. He retired from the post on 24 November 2018.

== Lieutenant Governorship (2019 - 2023) ==
Radha Krishna Mathur was appointed to be the first Lieutenant Governor of Ladakh by the President of India on 25 October 2019. He was formally sworn in on 31 October 2019 when the Union Territory of Ladakh came into existence. On 12 February 2023, B D Mishra succeeded him.

Political offices
Preceded by None; Union Territory created	Lieutenant Governor of Ladakh; 31 October 2019 - Present	Incumbent
