= Sudhakar Singh =

Sudhakar Singh may refer to:

- Sudhakar Singh (Bihar politician), Bihar politician
- Sudhakar Singh (Uttar Pradesh politician), Uttar Pradesh politician
