= Ziaul Mustafa Razvi Qadri =

Muhadith e Kabeer

His Eminence, Mufti Zia ul Mustafa Aazmi Aazmi Qadri Razvi Amjadi
- مفتی ضیاء المصطفیٰ اعظمی رضوی قادری امجدی
- Born: Muhammad Waahid Ali; 2nd Shawwal 1354 28 December 1935 (age 90); Ghosi, Azamgarh, United Provinces, British India
- Other names: Mumtaz ul Fuqaha, Muhadith E Kabeer, Allamah Shab
- Citizenship: Indian
- Education: Al Jamiatul Ashrafia ( 1369–1377)
- Occupations: Mufti, Muhadith, Religious Orator, Islamic Scholar
- Era: Contemporary
- Organization: Jamia Amjadia Rizvia
- Known for: Spiritual Mythology, Teaching Hadith, Muslim Leader
- Notable work: Sharah (Annotation) of Al-Tirmidhi Sharif
- Title: Mumtaz ul Fuqaha, Muhadith E Kabeer, Ameer ul Mo’mineen fil Hadith, Ustaaz ul Ulama, Mumtaz ul Muhaddiseen, Naa’ib Qaazi ul Quz’zat fil Hind
- Predecessor: Mufti Amjad Ali Aazmi
- Board member of: Islamic Community of India
- Children: Mufti Ata ul Mustafa Aazmi, Mufti Abu Yousuf Muhammad Qadri and 2 other Sons, 3 Daughter
- Father: Mufti Amjad Ali Aazmi
- Family: Mufti Amjad Ali Aazmi

Religious life
- Religion: Islam
- Denomination: Sunni
- Institute: Taibatul Ulma Jamia Amjadia Rizvia and Kulyatul Banatul Amjadia
- Founder of: Taibatul Ulma Jamia Amjadia Rizvia and Kulyatul Banatul Amjadia
- Lineage: Mufti Amjad Ali Aazmi
- Jurisprudence: Hanafi
- Tariqa: Qadiriyya
- Movement: Barelvi

Muslim leader
- Teacher: Mufti Amjad Ali Aazmi, Faizul Aarifeen Allamah Ghulaam Aasi, Huzoor Haafiz E Millat Allamah Shah Abdul Aziz Mubarakpuri,
- Students: About 30,000 Students, Mufti Abu Yusuf Muhammad Qadri, Maulana Afthab Cassim al-Qaadiri Razvi Noori Founder of Imam Mustafa Raza Research Centre, Durban, South Africa,
- Website: amiaamjadia.net

Zia-al Mustafa Aazmi (Urdu: ضیاء المصطفیٰ اعظمی رضوی قادری; Hindi: ज़ियाउल मुस्तफा आज़मी) known reverentially as Muhaddis-e-Kabeer is an Indian Islamic scholar, teacher, orator, debater, Muhaddith and Faqih and is currently serving as Naa’ib Qaazi ul Quz’zat fil Hind (Deputy Islamic Chief Justice of India) under Mufti Asjad Raza Khan. He belongs to the Barelvi movement of Sunni Islam. He is the Head Mufti of Jamia Amjadia Razvia.

He has memorised over 60,000 hadith with their narrators, having taught Bukhari and Muslim for over five decades and producing tens of thousands of scholars. He was included in The 500 Most Influential Muslims published by Royal Islamic Strategic Studies Centre in 2013 and 2016.

== Early life and education ==
Mustafa was born on 28 December 1935 corresponding to 2nd of Shawwal Hijri 1354 in Ghosi, Uttar Pradesh, India to Amjad Ali Aazmi, former Grand Mufti of India and a successor of Ahmed Raza Khan Barelvi. His birth name was Muhammad Waahid Ali. He traces his lineage to Maulana Khayrud’deen.

Mustafa got his early education under the tutelage of his father Amjad Ali Aazmi, later he went to study under the scholar Ghulaam Aasi. He enrolled at Jamia Ashrafia Mubarakpur under Shah Abdul Azeez Muradabadi. He studied various Islamic sciences and graduated at the age of 19 from Jamia Ashrafia in 1377 AH (1957/1958 CE). His teacher Shah Abdul Aziz Muradabadi said, "Whatever I have attained from Huzoor Sadrush Shariah, I have given all of it to Zia ul Mustafa."

== Life and services ==
He was appointed as faculty at Jamia Ashrafia Mubarakpur, Azamgarh, India at the age of 22. He is president of Sharai Council of India and heads annual Fiqahi seminars at Bareilly. He is founder of two Madrasas Taibatul Ulma Jamia Amjadia Rizvia and Kulyatul Banatul Amjadia (for Girls). The institute for girls education was established at the request of his mother Hazra in 1981. Mustafa was appointed as a Deputy grand Mufti of India, in the 16th Annual Fiqahi Seminar in March 2019 held at Bareilly. He has taught several thousand students who have themselves become scholars and are associated with both the Sunni and Sufi movements.

He was considered ‘Mumtaz ul Fuqaha’ at Ashrafia. His famous title is Muhadith E Kabeer.

=== Books and treaties ===
He is presently writing a Sharh (commentary) of the famous hadith collection Sunan at-Tirmidhi.

=== Fatawa writing ===
He has written several thousands of Fatawas on various topics since his working under Mustafa Raza Khan. He was appointed as successor (khalifa) of Mufti Azam-e-Hind Mustafa Rida Khan also.

=== Debater or Munazir ===
According to his official website, he specialized in debate and Ahle Sunnah beliefs and faith and has won famous Debates of Badayun, Banaras and Katihar against Deobandi and Wahhabi scholars. He regularly heads Islamic seminars and conferences all over India and in other parts of the world.

Preceded by Mufti Amjad Ali Aazmi	Figurehead of the family of Mufti Amjad Ali Aazmi	Succeeded by Incumbent
