= Semrajpur, Mau =

- village
- Location in Uttar Pradesh, India Semrajpur, Mau (India)
- Coordinates: 25.989158°N 83.757853°E
- Country: India
- State: Uttar Pradesh
- District: Mau

Languages
  - Official: Hindi
- Time zone: UTC+5:30 (IST)
- PIN: 221706
- Telephone code: +0547

Semrajpur is a village nearly 25 km from Mau in eastern direction. Semrajpur has a pin code of 221706 and comes under post office of Semrajpur. It belongs to Ratanpura block and constituency of Ghosi. Semrajpur Gram Panchayat has 4 primary schools that promote education among children until their primary education. The schools in Semrajpur are a part of Mid Day Meal Authority Plan launched by Government of India to facilitate free lunch for students enrolled in primary schools.
