= Jamia Amjadia Razvia =

India Islamic seminary

Taibatul Ulma Jamia Amjadia Rizvia
- جامعہ امجدیہ رضویہ
- Type: Islamic university
- Established: 21 August 1982 (Hijri date: 2 Dhu al-Qi'dah 1402)
- Affiliations: Uttar Pradesh Madarsa Educational Board
- Chairman: Ziaul Mustafa Razvi Qadri
- Students: 700
- Location: Ghosi, Uttar Pradesh, India
- Nickname: Taibatul Ulema
- Website: jamiaamjadia.net

Jamia Amjadia Rizvia is an Islamic seminary (Madrasa) of the Sunni denomination situated in Ghosi city in Indian state of Uttar Pradesh. It was established by Ziaul Mustafa Razvi Qadri a north Indian Muhaddith: scholar of hadith and son of a 19th-century Faqih Mufti Amjad Ali Aazmi.

== Festivals ==
The annual Urs of Amjad Ali Aazmi is celebrated in the ground of Madrasa.

== See also ==
- List of Islamic educational institutions
