= List of lieutenant governors of Ladakh =

Ladakh's head of state & government

Lieutenant Governor of Ladakh
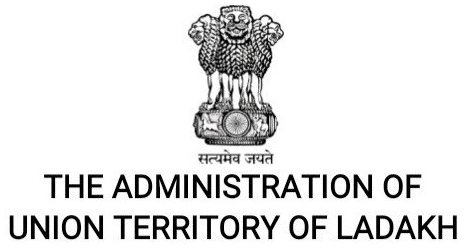
- Emblem of Ladakh

- Flag of India

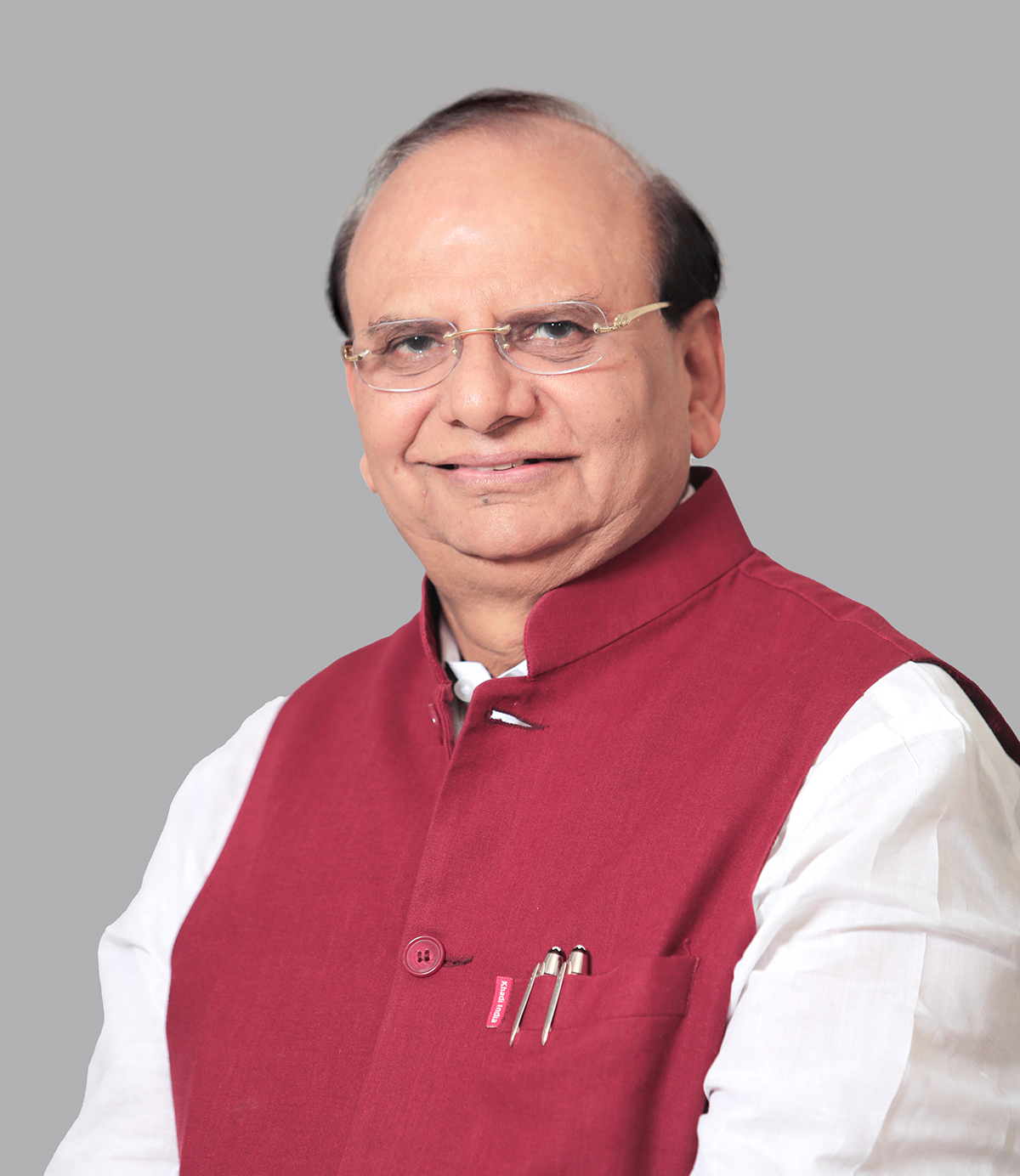
- Incumbent; Vinai Kumar Saxena since 13 March 2026
- Style: The Honourable; His Excellency
- Type: Lieutenant Governor
- Status: Head of State
- Residence: Lok Niwas, Leh
- Appointer: President of India
- Term length: Five Years
- Inaugural holder: R. K. Mathur
- Formation: 31 October 2019; 6 years ago
- Website: Official website

This is a list of lieutenant governors of Ladakh, a Union territory of India that came into existence on 31 October 2019. The lieutenant governor is directly appointed by the president of India. The lieutenant governor acts as the representative of the Central Government who is not obliged to the Legislature, which in case of Ladakh does not have a legislature. The Central Government governs the territory via the lieutenant governor.

On 13th March 2026, Vinai Kumar Saxena took oath as the 4th lieutenant governor of Ladakh following the resignation of then LG Kavinder Gupta. Saxena was previously the Lieutenant Governor of Delhi.

== Background ==
In 5th August 2019, a Reorganisation Act was passed by both houses of the Indian Parliament. The provisions contained in the reorganised the state of Jammu and Kashmir into two union territories; Jammu and Kashmir and Ladakh on 31 October 2019. The act established the position of Lieutenant Governor of Ladakh.

== History ==
The inaugural lieutenant governor was former defence secretary and chief information commissioner Radha Krishna Mathur who took over on 31 October 2019. He served in office until being removed in February 2023. Mathur was succeeded by Arunachal Pradesh governor Brigadier B. D. Mishra on 16 February 2023. Mishra was succeeded by Kavinder Gupta on 18 July 2025. Gupta was succeeded by Vinai Kumar Saxena on 13 March 2026.

== Lieutenant governors of Ladakh ==
Legend

- ^{†} Died in office
- ^{§} Transferred
- ^{‡} Resigned/removed

Color key

- indicates acting/additional charge
- indicates position vacant

#	Portrait	Name (lifespan)	Home state/ union territory	Tenure in office			Appointed by
#	Portrait	Name (lifespan)	Home state/ union territory	From	To	Time in office	Appointed by
1		Radha Krishna Mathur; IAS (Retd.) (born 1953)	Uttar Pradesh	31 October 2019	16 February 2023^{[‡]}	3 years, 108 days	Ram Nath Kovind
2		Brigadier (Dr.); B. D. Mishra (Retd.) (born 1939)	Uttar Pradesh	16 February 2023	18 July 2025^{[‡]}	2 years, 152 days	Droupadi Murmu
3		Kavinder Gupta (born 1960)	Jammu and Kashmir	18 July 2025	13 March 2026^{[‡]}	238 days	Droupadi Murmu
4		Vinai Kumar Saxena (born 1958)	Uttar Pradesh	13 March 2026	Incumbent	214 days	Droupadi Murmu

== Oath ==
“I, A. B., do swear in the name of God/solemly affirm that I will faithfully execute the office of Lieutenant Governor (or discharge the functions of the Lieutenant Governor) of Ladakh and will to the best of my ability preserve, protect and defend the Constitution and the law and that I will devote myself to the service and well-being of the people of Ladakh.”

== See also ==
- Governor (India)
