= Ghosi, Uttar Pradesh Assembly constituency =

Constituency of the Uttar Pradesh legislative assembly in India

Coordinates: 26.11°N 83.54°E

Ghosi
- Constituency No. 354 for the Uttar Pradesh Legislative Assembly

Constituency details
- Country: India
- Region: North India
- State: Uttar Pradesh
- District: Mau
- Lok Sabha constituency: Ghosi
- Reservation: None

Member of Legislative Assembly
- 18th Uttar Pradesh Legislative Assembly
- Incumbent Vacant

Ghosi is an assembly constituency of the Uttar Pradesh Legislative Assembly covering the city of Ghosi in the Mau district of Uttar Pradesh, India.

Ghosi is one of five assembly segments in the Ghosi Lok Sabha constituency. Since 2008, this assembly constituency has been numbered 354 among 403 constituencies.

In 2022 the MLA was Dara Singh Chauhan of Samajwadi Party. He resigned and joined the Bharatiya Janata Party. In the subsequent by-election in 2023 the candidate of the Samajwadi Party, Sudhakar Singh won the seat, defeating Dara Singh Chauhan. SIngh subsequently died on 20 November 2025.

== Members of Legislative Assembly ==
Year	Member	Party
1957	Jharkhande Rai	Communist Party of India
1962	Jharkhande Rai	Communist Party of India
1967	Jharkhande Rai	Communist Party of India
1969	Ram Bilas Pandey	Indian National Congress
1974	Zafar Azami	Communist Party of India
1977	Vikrama Rai	Janata Party
1980	Kedar Singh	Indian National Congress (I)
1985	Phagu Chauhan	Lokdal
1989	Subhash	Indian National Congress
1991	Phagu Chauhan	Janata Dal
1993	Achaibar Bharti	Bahujan Samaj Party
1996	Phagu Chauhan	Bharatiya Janata Party
2002	Phagu Chauhan	Bharatiya Janata Party
2007	Phagu Chauhan	Bahujan Samaj Party
2012	Sudhakar Singh	Samajwadi Party
2017	Phagu Chauhan	Bharatiya Janata Party
2019^	Vijay Rajbhar	Bharatiya Janata Party
2022	Dara Singh Chauhan	Samajwadi Party
2023^	Sudhakar Singh	Samajwadi Party
2027		

== Election results ==
=== 2027 ===
2027 Uttar Pradesh Legislative Assembly election: Ghosi
Party	Candidate	Votes	%	±%
SP	Sujit Singh			
NDA				
BSP				
NOTA	None of the above			
Majority				
Turnout				
gain from		Swing		

=== 2023 bypoll ===
Uttar Pradesh Assembly by-election, 2023: Ghosi
Party	Candidate	Votes	%	±%
SP	Sudhakar Singh	124,427	57.19	▲14.98
BJP	Dara Singh Chauhan	81,668	37.54	▲3.97
NOTA	None of the Above	1,725		
Majority		42,759		
Turnout		2,17,571		
SP hold		Swing		

=== 2022 ===
2022 Uttar Pradesh Legislative Assembly election: Ghosi
Party	Candidate	Votes	%	±%
SP	Dara Singh Chauhan	108,430	42.21	+17.69
BJP	Vijay Rajbhar	86,214	33.57	−2.97
BSP	Wasim Iqbal	54,248	21.12	−12.52
NOTA	None of the above	1,249	0.49	−0.17
Majority		22,216	8.64	+5.74
Turnout		256,855	58.53	−0.36
SP gain from BJP		Swing		

=== 2019 bypoll ===
By-election, 2019: Ghosi
Party	Candidate	Votes	%	±%
BJP	Vijay Rajbhar	68,371		
Independent	Sudhakar Singh	66,598		
BSP	Abdul Qayyum Ansari	50,775		
INC	Rajmangal Yadav	11,624		
SBSP	Nebulal	11,485		
CPI	Sheikh Hisamuddin	2,938		
Majority		1,773		
Turnout		2,20,597	51.93	
BJP hold		Swing		

=== 2017 ===
2017 General Elections: Ghosi
Party	Candidate	Votes	%	±%
BJP	Fagu Chauhan	88,298	36.54	
BSP	Abbas Ansari	81,295	33.64	
SP	Sudhakar Singh	59,256	24.52	
CPI	Vivek Rai	2,285	0.95	
NOTA	None of the above	1,585	0.66	
Majority		7,003	2.9	
Turnout		241,634	58.89	
BJP gain from SP		Swing		
