= Vinai Kumar Saxena =

Lieutenant Governor of Ladakh

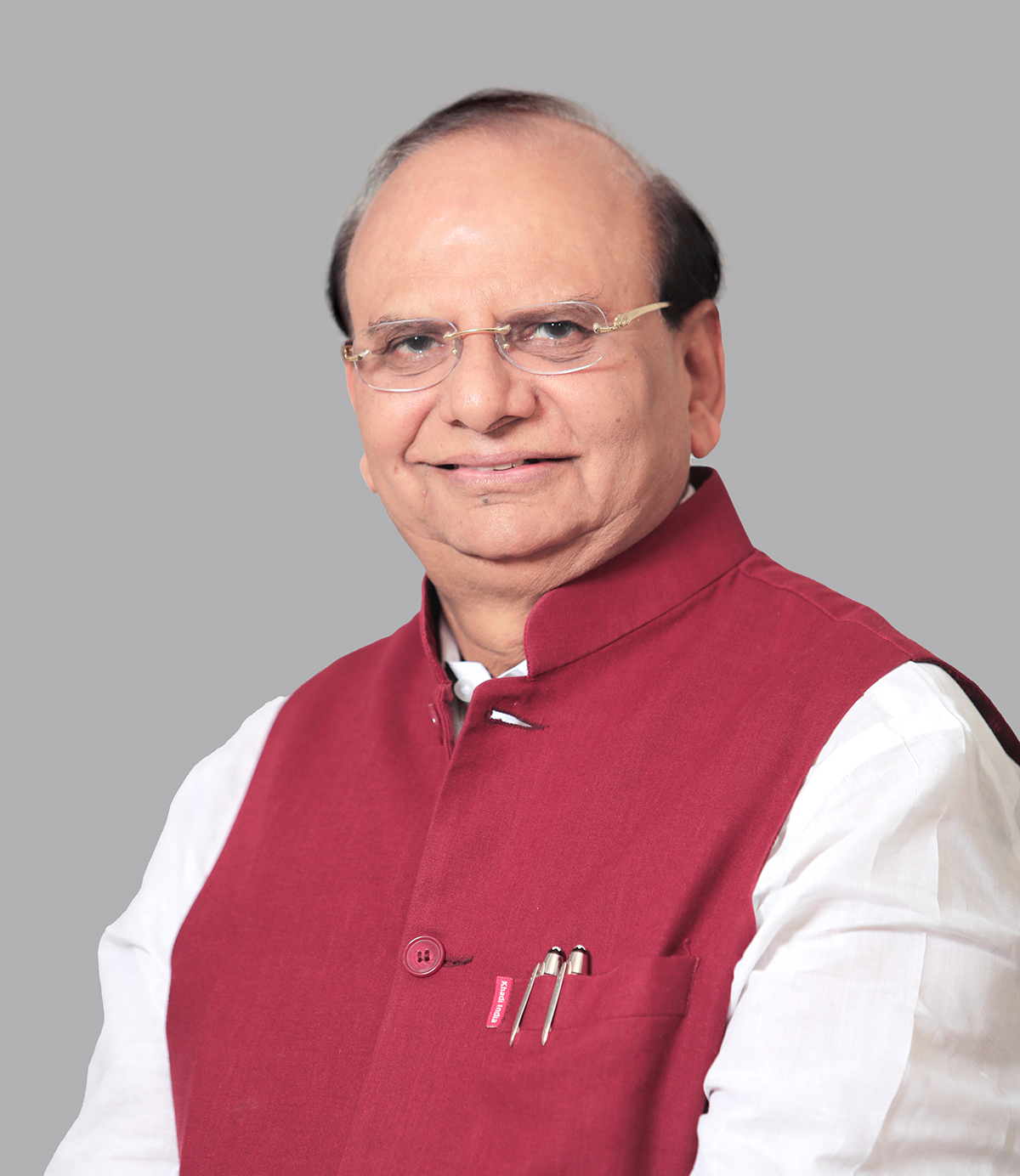
- Saxena c. 2022

4th Lieutenant Governor of Ladakh
- Incumbent
- Assumed office 13 March 2026
- President: Droupadi Murmu
- Preceded by: Kavinder Gupta

Lieutenant Governor of Delhi
- In office 26 May 2022 – 6 March 2026
- Chief Minister: Arvind Kejriwal (2022–2024); Atishi Marlena (2024–2025); Rekha Gupta (2025–)
- Preceded by: Anil Baijal
- Succeeded by: Taranjit Singh Sandhu

Chairman of the Khadi and Village Industries Commission
- In office 25 October 2015 – 23 May 2022
- Preceded by: Arun Kumar Jha
- Succeeded by: Manoj Kumar

Personal details
- Born: 23 March 1958 (age 68) Banda, Uttar Pradesh, India
- Party: Independent
- Spouse: Sangita Saxena
- Children: 2
- Education: Kanpur University
- Occupation: Business executive; activist

Vinai Kumar Saxena (born 23 March 1958) is an Indian business executive who is currently serving as the 4th Lieutenant Governor of Ladakh since 2026. He previously served as the 22nd Lieutenant Governor of Delhi from 2022 to 2026. He previously served as chairman of the Khadi and Village Industries Commission from 2015 to 2022. He also served as the president of Kumarappa National Handmade Paper Institute.

His tenure as the Lieutenant Governor of Delhi has been marred by allegations of partisanship, undue indulgences, and persistent interference in the administrative functions of the elected Delhi Government. Such criticisms have been amplified by his long-standing admiration for and association with Prime Minister Narendra Modi, whose party, the BJP, has remained at loggerheads with the Aam Aadmi Party, its principal opposition that governed Delhi until early 2025.

== Early life and education ==
Saxena was born on 23 March 1958 in Banda district of Uttar Pradesh. In 1975, he founded a student union within his institution, Mardhan Singh Inter College in Talbehat, Lalitpur, and was later elected its general secretary. In 1981, he graduated from Kanpur University. He holds a pilot license.

== Earlier career ==
Saxena began his professional career as an assistant officer in J.K. Group of companies in Rajasthan. He was eventually appointed the general manager of the group. Saxena later went on to become the CEO and director of the Dholera Port Project in Dholera. He also led the construction of concrete gravity dam of the Sardar Sarovar Project (SSP) with the backing of the Sardar Sarovar Narmada Nigam Limited.

=== National Council for Civil Liberties of India ===
In 1991, he started the National Council for Civil Liberties of India (NCCL), an NGO headquartered in Ahmedabad. His organisation opposed Medha Patkar and the Narmada Bachao Andolan, an environmental initiative aimed at the ecological preservation and prevention of the displacement of thousands of people owing to the construction of the Sardar Sarovar Project in Gujarat, and other upcoming hydro projects on Narmada Valley. A long-running criminal defamation case filed by Saxena in 2001 against Patkar culminated in her conviction by the Delhi Court on 24 May 2024. The court held Patkar guilty of defamation.

As president of the NCCL, he unsuccessfully petitioned the Gujarat High Court in 2011 against then-Governor of Gujarat Bw's appointment of retired judge Rameshchandra Amrut Mehta as Lokayukta, claiming a "breach of constitutional propriety" for "bypassing" the advice of the state's council of ministers, led by then–Chief Minister Narendra Modi, who would later, as Prime Minister, appoint him the Lieutenant Governor of Delhi. However, in 2012, the appointment of the Lokayukta in Gujarat was upheld by multiple courts, including the Gujarat High Court and the Supreme Court of India. The courts dismissed Saxena's petition, holding that while "the governor is bound to act under the advice of the Council of Ministers," Mehta's appointment was valid as it was made in consultation with the Chief Justice of the Gujarat High Court. The post of Gujarat's Lokayukta, the state's anti-corruption ombudsman, had been vacant for over nine years before the Governor made efforts to initiate an appointment.

=== Later career ===
Saxena was appointed as a "Member of University Court" of Jawaharlal Nehru University in 2019. In 2020, he was nominated as a member of the decision-making body of the Council for Scientific and Industrial Research at the Institute of Himalayan Bioresource Technology.

Saxena later became associated with Kumarappa National Handmade Paper Institute (KNHPI).

== Chairman of KVIC ==
In 2015, Vinai was appointed chairperson of the Khadi and Village Industries Commission (KVIC), an organization responsible for promoting rural employment and small-scale industries in India. During his tenure, KVIC introduced several product, including plastic-mixed handmade paper and Khadi Prakritik Paint, a wall paint made from cow dung that later received a patent from the Government of India in September 2022.

In 2017–18, the organization recorded a 13 percent increase in sales, and in 2018–19, revenues rose by more than 25 percent to nearly ₹75,000 crore. In 2021–22, KVIC reported a turnover of ₹1.15 lakh crore, the highest in its history.

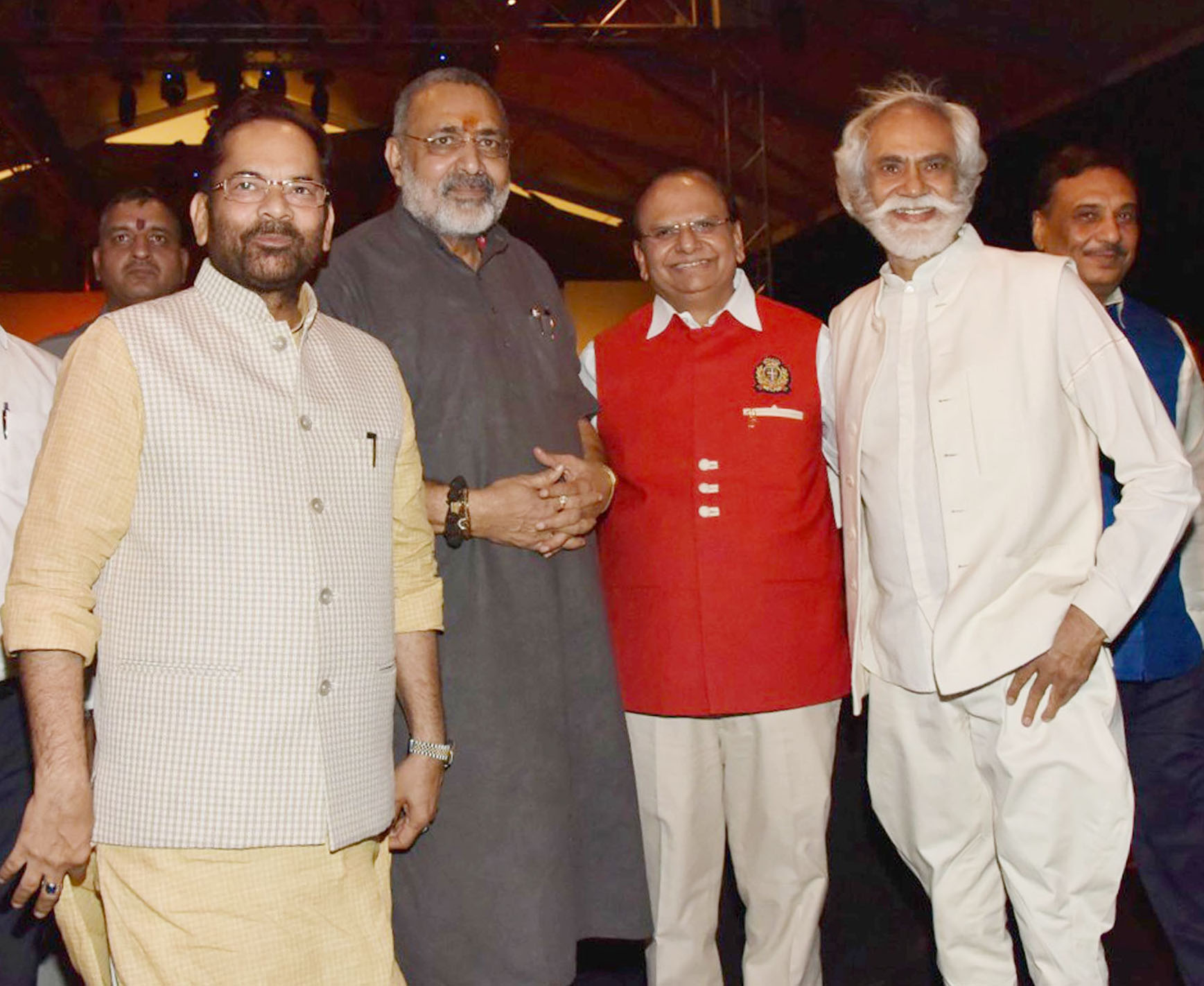
Saxena (in red) at the Khadi Fashion Show during the International SME convention 2018, in New Delhi

During Saxena's chairmanship, KVIC signed agreements with several major textile companies, including Raymond Group, Aditya Birla Fashion and Retail, and Arvind Mills, to promote and market khadi products in India and overseas.

== Sustainable habitat initiatives ==
=== Plantation drive ===
During Saxena's tenure as Chairperson of the Khadi and Village Industries Commission (KVIC) from 2015 to 2022, the organisation launched several environmental initiatives. These included a nationwide campaign for the plantation of Moringa oleifera—approximately 45,000 trees—in states such as Uttar Pradesh, Bihar, West Bengal, Assam, Gujarat, Rajasthan, and Delhi. The campaign was intended to promote beekeeping and raise awareness about the plant's nutritional and medicinal properties.

In 2021, he launched Project BOLD ("Bamboo Oasis on Lands in Drought") to establish bamboo plantations in arid and semi-arid areas of India. Under the project, around 31,000 bamboo saplings were planted over 42.47 lakh square feet across regions such as Udaipur, Jaisalmer, Barmer, Leh, Ladakh, Goa, Gujarat, Varanasi, and Jammu.

== Lieutenant Governorships (2022- present) ==
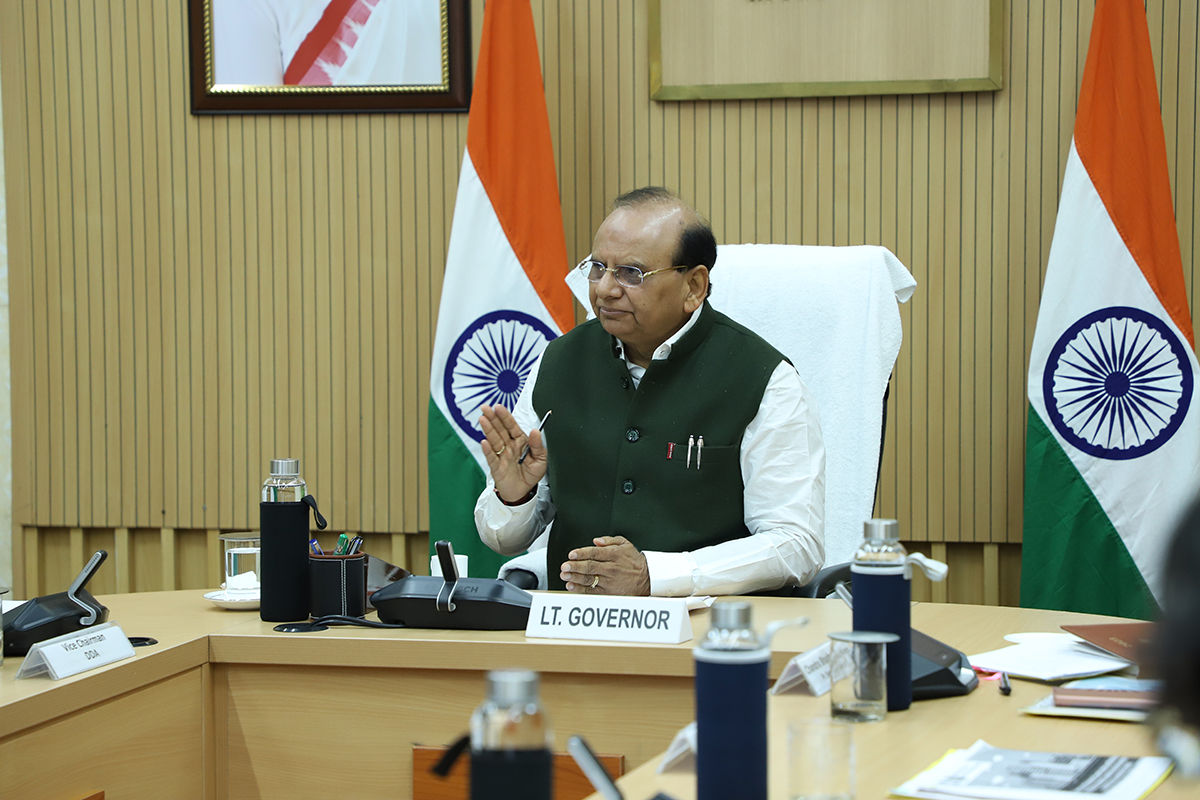
Saxena in January 2023

=== Lieutenant Governor of Delhi (2022 - 2026) ===
On 23 May 2022, Saxena was appointed the Lieutenant Governor of National Capital Territory of Delhi by the President of India, becoming the maiden corporate individual ever selected for a gubernatorial post. He succeeded Anil Baijal for the post, who was in office since 2016. In 2023, National Green Tribunal appointed Saxena as chairperson of a high-level committee on the Yamuna Rejuvenation Project, which is a part of Namami Gange Programme, but the appointment was stayed by an order of the Supreme Court of India in July of the same year.

On 20 February 2025, Saxena administered the oath of office to the newly elected CM of Delhi, Rekha Gupta, at the oath ceremony hosted in Ramlila Maidan.

=== Allegations of partisan conduct, close relations with the BJP, and controversies ===
Saxena's tenure as Delhi's Lieutenant Governor has been marked by frequent clashes with the Aam Aadmi Party (AAP)–led elected government, whose dominance in the capital has long been a source of frustration and setback for the Bharatiya Janata Party (BJP) at the state level. Prime Minister Narendra Modi, who oversees the BJP, has often directed sharp jibes, critical remarks, and political retorts at Arvind Kejriwal, the former Chief Minister of Delhi and the national convener of the AAP. Saxena shares close relations with Modi, often heaping him with praises and laudatory remarks. During his tenure as the chairperson of the Khadi and Village Industries Commission, Saxena commissioned the 2017 edition of KVIC's calendar and diaries prominently featuring Modi's photo, replacing that of Mahatma Gandhi, which stirred up a brouhaha.

Against the backdrop of burgeoning crime against women, a problem for which Delhi incurs notoriety in particular, the Bus Marshal Scheme was introduced by the AAP-led Delhi Government in 2015, whereby appointed marshals safeguarded the security of women and children aboard the vast fleet of buses operated by the Delhi Transport Corporation. This move also prompted by the fact that the Delhi Government lacks authority over Delhi Police, which is exclusively controlled by the Union Home Ministry.

In 2023, however, Saxena ordered the termination of all civil defence volunteers discharging duties as bus marshals, effectively dismantling a program meant to protect vulnerable commuters. Atishi, a member of the Delhi Council of Ministers, publicly urged Saxena to reinstate the program, but her plea was ignored.

On 28 February 2024, Saxena suspended the Delhi Solar Policy 2024, which had been announced a month earlier by the AAP-led Delhi Government. The policy aimed to reduce electricity bills and promote solar energy usage by allowing consumers to sell excess power back to the grid for a commission. The suspension of the program drew criticism, particularly given Delhi's severe air pollution, one of the highest levels among major global cities.

In 2024, Saxena's office ordered the termination of 233 contractual staff working for the Delhi Commission for Women, a statutory body entrusted with the investigation and examination of all matters pertaining to the safety of women. Saxena claimed that their appointment was in "violation of the guidelines" of the Government of Delhi.

Saxena has been accused of frequently acting on behalf of the Bharatiya Janata Party by interfering in the affairs of the Delhi Government, which was controlled by the BJP’s principal political rivals, the Aam Aadmi Party, until February 2025.

==== Erosion of Delhi Government powers through the LG Office ====
In the Government of NCT of Delhi v. Union of India lawsuit heard by the Supreme Court of India in 2018, the court ruled that the Lieutenant Governor of Delhi held no independent decision-making authority, and that the Governor, appointed by the Union Government, was obligated to follow the "aid and advice" of the elected Government of Delhi on all subjects except for those related to public order, policing, and land, domains over which the Home Ministry exercised exclusive jurisdiction owing to Delhi's distinct status as a federal territory. The judgment also stated that the elected legislature of Delhi was not required to seek the concurrence of the Lieutenant Governor over its decisions. This decision effectively upheld the paramountcy of the elected Delhi Government as the ultimate authority. In a bid to undermine the implications stemming from this judgement, the BJP-led Union Government introduced The Government of NCT of Delhi (Amendment) Act, 2021, on 24 March in the Rajya Sabha, which, upon passing a vote, was signed into law by President Kovind on March 28. Per the amendment, which modified the National Capital Territory of Delhi Act, 1991, any references to the term "Delhi Government" in any legislation or law ratified by the Delhi Legislative Assembly would now refer to the Lieutenant Governor of Delhi. The Union Government justified this move claiming it was necessary to ensure "complete synchronisation" between it and the Government of Delhi. This amendment considerably diminished the Delhi Government's authority over administration, relegating it of the paramountcy it previously held by forcing it to seek the consent and opinion of the Lieutenant Governor before undertaking any executive action. The BJP was accused of undermining the mandate of the elected government, which was overseen by its political adversary, by usurping its power in favour of its own representative, an office not accountable to the public.

On 11 May 2023, the Supreme Court of India ruled in favour of the Delhi Government yet again on the subject of who held authority over the bureaucrats in the administration of services. The contention stemmed primarily from the interpretation of Article 239AA(3)(a) of the Indian Constitution, whose inclusion by the 69th Amendment of 1991 was spurred by the desires of the citizenry of Delhi to be conferred with statehood. The bench, headed by Chief Justice of India DY Chandrachud, held that the legislature (elected government) has control over bureaucrats in administration of services and control over officers' transfer and posting except in matters of public order, police and land. The judgment re-established that power rested with the Government of Delhi, and that the bureaucrats of its administration were accountable to the elected Council of Ministers. However, in another bid to circumvent the legal precedents established by this seminal verdict, the BJP-led Union Government retaliated by promulgating an ordinance—a temporary executive measure designed to sidestep scrutiny by courts and legislature—titled the Government of National Capital Territory of Delhi (Amendment) Ordinance, 2023, that effectively grant the Lieutenant Governor primacy and overriding powers over the Delhi Government on the subject of bureaucracy. This ordinance entailed the establishment of the National Capital Civil Services Authority (NCCSA), whose sole purview is to authorise the transfer, posting, and initiation of disciplinary proceedings against bureaucrats. By constituting the NCCSA in such a fashion that its constitution favoured the Union Government, the Chief Minister of Delhi finds himself virtually outvoted by members beholden to the Union Government. This clever constitution of the NCCSA effectively strips the elected Government of Delhi over its powers previously re-instated by the 2023 Supreme Court judgement.

In the wake of its 2025 electoral win in the state elections in Delhi, the BJP-led Delhi Government petitioned the Supreme Court to withdraw all legal proceedings initiated by the outgoing AAP government against the Union Government and Lieutenant Governor.

=== Lieutenant Governor of Ladakh (2026 - Incumbent) ===
On 13 March 2026, he was sworn in as the Lieutenant governor of Ladakh.

== Personal life ==
Saxena was born and grew up in Banda, Uttar Pradesh. In his autobiography, he wrote that he grew up on the banks of the Paishwani, a tributary of Yamuna river. He is married to Sangita Saxena, who is an educationist and social worker based in New Delhi. Their daughter Shivangi Saxena is an interior designer.

== Controversies ==
While serving as the Lieutenant Governor of Delhi, Aam Aadmi Party (AAP) leaders alleged Saxena's involvement in a khadi scam and money laundering amounting to ₹1,400 crore during his tenure as chairman of the Khadi and Village Industries Commission. He denied the accusations, and issued legal notices to the AAP leaders. The Delhi High Court granted Saxena interim relief, directing AAP to remove defamatory posts from social media.

The Deputy Chief Minister of Delhi, Manish Sisodia, accused Saxena of approving the Delhi Excise Policy (2021–22) introduced by the Delhi Government without raising concerns about the opening of outlets in unauthorized areas, alleging that Saxena changed his position according to evolving circumstances. After assuming office in 2022, Saxena recommended a Central Bureau of Investigation probe into the Delhi liquor scam.

On 16 March 2023, AAP politician Sanjay Singh released a video, accusing Saxena of "leading a violent mob" against activist and later AAP candidate Medha Patkar in 2002 at Sabarmati Ashram in Gujarat. The case remains sub-judice, with Saxena named as an accused.

== Work(s) ==
=== Autobiography ===
- Racing to Restore: the Yamuna Memoir (December 2023)

== See also ==
- List of lieutenant governors of Delhi
- Third Kejriwal ministry
