= Vijay Rajbhar =

Indian politician (born 1989)

Member of Uttar Pradesh Legislative Assembly
- In office 2017–2022
- Preceded by: Phagu Chauhan
- Succeeded by: Dara Singh Chauhan
- Constituency: Ghosi

Personal details
- Born: 1 January 1989 (age 37) Sahadatpura, Mau district, Uttar Pradesh
- Party: Bharatiya Janata Party
- Spouse: Shashi Bharadwaj (m. 2011)
- Children: 1 son
- Parent: Nandlal Rajbhar (father)
- Education: Diploma in Computer Science

Vijay Kumar Rajbhar is an Indian politician. He was elected to the Uttar Pradesh Legislative Assembly from Ghosi in the 2019 by election as a member of the Bharatiya Janata Party. The by-election was triggered by Phagu Chauhan being appointed Governor of Bihar.
