= Rajkumar Rai =

Indian politician

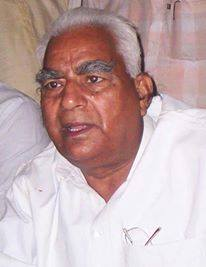
Raj Kumar Rai

Raj Kumar Rai was a Lok Sabha member from 1984 to 1989 representing Ghosi. He was also a member of the Uttar Pradesh Legislative Assembly from 1980 to 1985, and the Public Accounts Committee from 1983 to 1984.

== Biography ==
He was born on 1 January 1939, in Surajpur, a village of Mau district, in Uttar Pradesh.

After completing his early education in the village he went to Varansi where he completed an M.A., LL.B from Banaras Hindu University. He was an advocate for the Azamgarh civil court. He first joined congress party and worked as and MLA in UP legislative assembly. In 1984 he was elected a member of parliament (Lok Sabha) for Ghosi, under Prime minister Rajiv Gandhi. After some years he resigned from the membership of Lok Sabha and from the Congress party. He then joined Vishwanath Pratap Singh's Janta Dal and became its national secretary. He contested several Lok Sabha elections and fought for the cause of socialism. After that he came in contact with Samajvadi party supremo Mulayam Singh Yadav and joined the party. He became the chairman of Uttar Pradesh Beej Pramanikaran Nigam (equivalent to cabinet minister).

He was married to Lalita Devi Rai with whom he had four children (two sons and two daughters). He was jailed twice on the occasion of the arrest of Indira Gandhi in 1977.

== Death ==
He died on 24 September 2012 aged 73. His last rituals were performed at Muktidham Dohrighat.

== Sources ==
=== Newspapers, journals and magazines ===
- Chowdhury, Neerja (20 September 1987). "V.P. Singh wave in MP". The Indian Express. Vol. LV, no. 322. Madras (published 21 September 1987). p. 10. Archived from the original on 2 January 2024.
- Written at New Delhi. "MP wants khadi bill sent to committee". The Indian Express. Vol. LV, no. 188. Madras (published 10 May 1987). UNI. 9 May 1987. p. 10. Archived from the original on 2 January 2024.
