= Kurem =

Coordinates: 25°51′N 83°47′E

Kurem is a Gram panchayat in the Rasra tehsil of the Ballia district of the Uttar Pradesh province in India. There are almost 12 villages that come under the Kurem Gram Panchayat. The link road for this village is connected from the BaduBandh chatti (small place for shopping) on the Rasra Ghazipur road. It is around 2 km from the chatti. Balipur is the most literate village in Kurem Gram Panchayat. The PIN code for Kurem is 221712. Kurem is also known for being the former prime minister Chandra Shekhar's wife's village.
