= Sudhakar Singh (Uttar Pradesh politician) =

Indian politician (1958–2025)

Member of Uttar Pradesh Legislative Assembly
- In office 5 September 2023 – 20 November 2025
- Preceded by: Dara Singh Chauhan
- Constituency: Ghosi
- In office 2012–2017
- Preceded by: Phagu Chauhan
- Succeeded by: Phagu Chauhan
- Constituency: Ghosi
- In office 1996–2002
- Preceded by: Rajendra Kumar
- Succeeded by: Kapildeo
- Constituency: Nathupur

Personal details
- Born: 11 November 1958
- Died: 20 November 2025 (aged 67) Lucknow, Uttar Pradesh, India
- Party: Samajwadi Party
- Education: Master of Arts
- Alma mater: DDU Gorakhpur University
- Occupation: Politician

Sudhakar Singh (11 November 1958 – 20 November 2025) was an Indian politician who was a member of the 18th Uttar Pradesh Assembly from the Ghosi Assembly constituency of Mau district. He was a member of the Samajwadi Party.

== Education ==
Sudhakar Singh completed his Master of Arts in sociology at Deen Dayal Upadhyay Gorakhpur University, Gorakhpur, in 1983.

== Posts held ==
#	From	To	Position	Comments
01	2023	2025	Member, Uttar Pradesh Legislative Assembly	Died in 2025

== Death ==
Singh died after a long illness in Lucknow, on 20 November 2025, at the age of 67.
