= Rajeev Kumar Rai =

Indian politician

Member of Parliament, Lok Sabha
- Incumbent
- Assumed office 4 June 2024
- Preceded by: Atul Rai
- Constituency: Ghosi

Personal details
- Born: 6 September 1972 (age 53) Surhi, Ballia, Uttar Pradesh
- Party: Samajwadi Party
- Spouse: Nikita Rai
- Children: 2
- Occupation: Politician

Rajeev Kumar Rai is an Indian politician, educationist, businessman, and philanthropist. He is currently serving as a Member of Parliament (MP) in the Lok Sabha, representing the Ghosi Lok Sabha constituency, elected in the 2024 Indian general elections.

== Early life ==
Rajeev Rai was born in Surhi village, Ballia district of Uttar Pradesh. His father is Raj Narayan Rai and wife is Nikita Rai. He has two sons, Ritvik Rai and Aditya Rai.

== Political career ==
Rajeev Rai's political career is closely linked with the Samajwadi Party. He played a crucial role in the party's success during the 2012 Uttar Pradesh elections, where the party secured an absolute majority. Known for his strategic acumen and communication skills, Rai has been a key figure in the party, often serving as its media face.

In the 2024 general elections, Rai was elected as the MP for the Ghosi constituency, securing a significant victory with a margin of 1,62,943 votes. His campaign emphasised development, social justice, and empowerment of marginalised communities.

== See also ==
- 18th Lok Sabha
- Samajwadi Party
- Ghosi Lok Sabha constituency
