= Jai Bahadur Singh =

Indian politician

Jai Bahadur Singh was an Indian Communist politician. He belonged to Bhumihar community and was an eminent leader and one of the pillars of the Communist Party of India in Uttar Pradesh. He was elected to the 3rd Lok Sabha and 4th Lok Sabha from Ghosi constituency.
