= Kavinder Gupta =

Governor of Himachal Pradesh (born 1959)

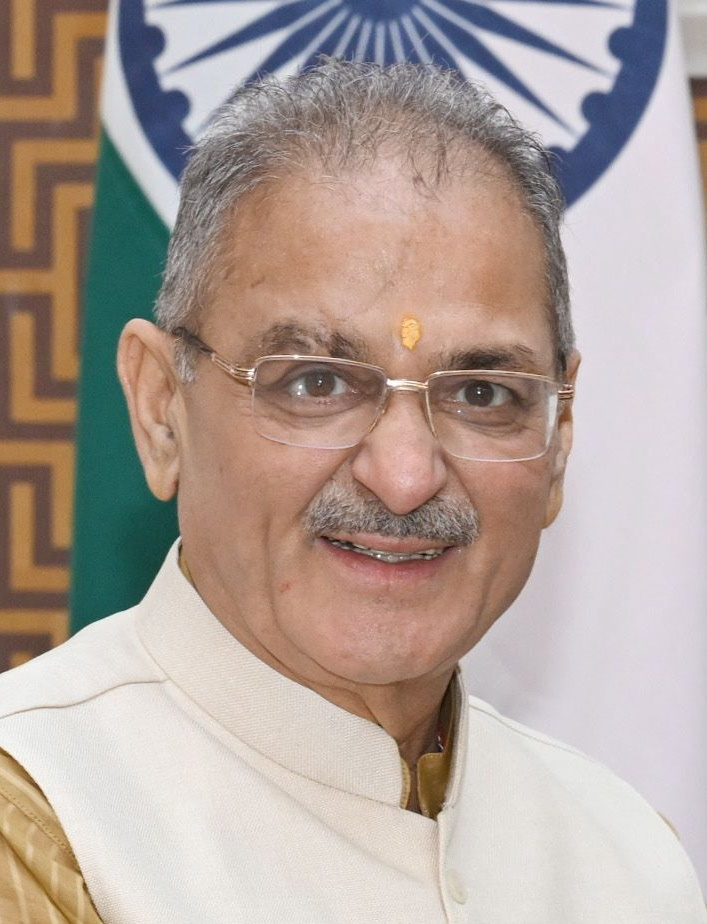
- Gupta in 2025

23rd Governor of Himachal Pradesh
- Incumbent
- Assumed office 11 March 2026
- President: Droupadi Murmu
- Chief Minsiter: Sukhvinder Singh Sukhu
- Preceded by: Shiv Pratap Shukla

3rd Lieutenant Governor of Ladakh
- In office 18 July 2025 – 13 March 2026
- President: Droupadi Murmu
- Preceded by: B. D. Mishra
- Succeeded by: Vinai Kumar Saxena

Deputy Chief Minister of Jammu and Kashmir
- In office 30 April 2018 – 19 June 2018
- Chief Minister: Mehbooba Mufti
- Preceded by: Nirmal Kumar Singh
- Succeeded by: President's rule Surinder Kumar Choudhary (UT)

Speaker of Jammu and Kashmir Legislative Assembly
- In office 18 March 2015 – 29 April 2018
- Governor: Narinder Nath Vohra
- Preceded by: Mubarak Gul
- Succeeded by: Nirmal Kumar Singh

Member of Jammu and Kashmir Legislative Assembly
- In office 23 December 2014 – 2018
- Preceded by: Raman Bhalla
- Succeeded by: Constituency abolished
- Constituency: Gandhinagar

Mayor of Jammu
- In office 2005–2010
- Succeeded by: Chander Mohan Gupta

Personal details
- Born: 2 December 1959 (age 66) Jammu, Jammu and Kashmir, India
- Party: Bharatiya Janata Party
- Occupation: Politician

Kavinder Gupta (born 2 December 1959) is an Indian politician serving as 23rd Governor of Himachal Pradesh since 2026, He previously served as 3rd Lieutenant Governor of Ladakh from 2025 until his resignation in 2026. Previously, he served as the last Deputy Chief Minister of Jammu and Kashmir state. Also he formerly served as the speaker of the Jammu & Kashmir Vidhan Sabha.

On 13 March 2026, Gupta resigned from the post of Lieutenant Governor of Ladakh after serving for just seven months in office.

== Personal life ==
Kavinder Gupta was born on 2 December 1959. He has three children – two daughters and one son.

== Political career ==
Gupta joined the Rashtriya Swayamsevak Sangh at the age of thirteen. He was jailed for thirteen months during The Emergency. Gupta served as the secretary of the Punjab unit of the Vishva Hindu Parishad from 1978 to 1979. He also served as the chief of the Jammu and Kashmir unit of the Bharatiya Yuva Morcha from 1993 till 1998.

Gupta was elected mayor of the city of Jammu for a record three consecutive terms, from 2005 to 2010. In the 2014 Jammu and Kashmir Legislative Assembly election, he contested as a member of Bharatiya Janata Party and was elected a Member of Legislative Assembly from the Gandhinagar constituency. He defeated Raman Bhalla of the Indian National Congress, the incumbent. On 19 March 2015, Gupta was elected speaker of the assembly. He also became the first ever Bharatiya Janata Party leader to be appointed the speaker.

On 30 April 2018, Gupta was appointed the Deputy Chief Minister of Jammu and Kashmir state as a part of a cabinet reshuffle. He succeeded Nirmal Kumar Singh.

On 19 June 2018, Gupta resigned from the post of Deputy Chief Minister after 51 days of taking the oath as BJP pulled out from the alliance with PDP. Ram Madhav, then BJP National General Secretary, presided over the press conference in which the announcement to end the alliance was made. He criticised the CM Mehbooba Mufti-led government, saying it had "failed in its responsibility." He added that increase in violence, threat to fundamental rights and increase in radicalisation were the main factors behind the BJP's decision to quit the J&K coalition government.

He was appointed 3rd Lieutenant Governor of Ladakh on 14 July 2025 by Droupadi Murmu.

== Controversies ==
In February 2015, Gupta courted controversy by blaming the Rohingya Muslim refugees for the 2018 Sunjuwan attack on an army camp. After being sworn in as the Deputy Chief Minister of the state, Gupta stated that the Kathua rape case was a "small incident [which] should not be given too much importance". Hindu right-wing groups had held rallies supporting the accused in the case, the gang-rape and murder of an eight-year-old Muslim girl. He faced criticism from opposition Indian National Congress and opposition leader Omar Abdullah. Gupta later said that the media had misinterpreted his comment.

Political offices
Preceded by B. D. Mishra	Lieutenant Governor of Ladakh; 18 July 2025 – Present	Incumbent
