= B. D. Mishra =

Indian army officer (born 1939)

Brigadier (Dr.) Bal Dutt Mishra
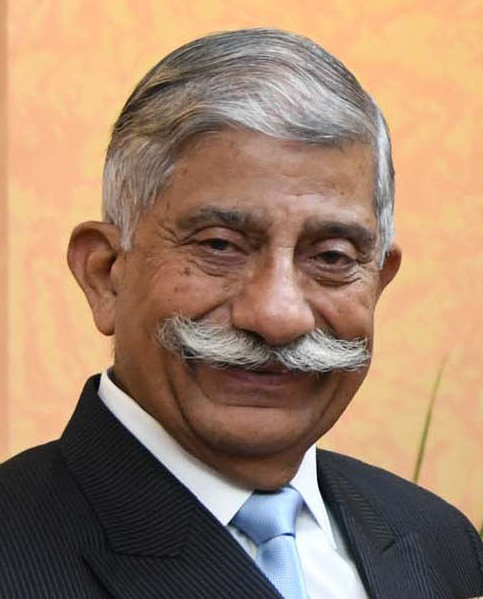
- Mishra in 2018

2nd Lieutenant Governor of Ladakh
- In office 16 February 2023 – 14 July 2025
- President: Droupadi Murmu
- Preceded by: Radha Krishna Mathur
- Succeeded by: Kavinder Gupta

19th Governor of Arunachal Pradesh
- In office 3 October 2017 – 15 February 2023
- Chief Minister: Pema Khandu
- Preceded by: Padmanabha Acharya
- Succeeded by: Lt. Gen. Kaiwalya Trivikram Parnaik (Retd.)

Governor of Meghalaya
- Additional Charge
- In office 4 October 2022 – 12 February 2023
- Chief Minister: Conrad Sangma
- Preceded by: Satyapal Malik
- Succeeded by: Phagu Chauhan

Governor of Mizoram
- Additional Charge
- In office 11 August 2021 – 5 November 2021
- Chief Minister: Zoramthanga
- Preceded by: Kambhampati Hari Babu
- Succeeded by: Kambhampati Hari Babu]

Personal details
- Born: 20 July 1939 (age 87) Kathauta, United Provinces, British India (present-day Uttar Pradesh, India)
- Party: Independent
- Spouse: Neelam Mishra
- Children: 2 (1 son and 1 daughter)

Military service
- Allegiance: India
- Branch/service: Indian Army
- Years of service: 1961 - 1995
- Battles/wars: Sino-Indian War, Indo-Pakistani War, 1965 & Bangladesh Liberation War

Brigadier (Dr.) Bal Dutt Mishra (born 20 July 1939) is a retired officer of the Indian Army, and former Lieutenant governor of Ladakh, Previously he held the offices of Governor of Arunachal Pradesh, Governor of Meghalaya and Governor of Mizoram.

== Career ==
Mishra retired from the Indian Army on 31 July 1995, after a career that began as a permanent regular infantry officer, on 17 December 1961. He was born on 20 July 1939.

Mishra was the commander of the NSG (Black Cat Commandos) Counter Hijack Task Force that assaulted the hijacked aircraft of Indian Airlines and successfully executed the rescue operation, at Raja Sansi Airfield, Amritsar, on 24 April 1993. All 124 travellers and crew members were rescued in the operation, after eliminating the hijackers, without any casualty or damage. Mishra received the Prime Minister's appreciation for his role in ending this hijack crisis.

== Operational roles ==
Mishra has served in various wars and operational roles for India:

- Against Chinese attack on India (1962)
- Against Naga insurgents in Nagaland (1963–1964)
- Against Pakistan in Sialkot Sector (1965)
- Against Pakistan in Liberation of Bangladesh (1971)
- Against Pakistan on LoC in Poonch Sector, as Battalion Commander (1979-1981)
- Against LTTE as the Leading Brigade Commander of the Indian Peace Keeping Force in Jaffna, Vavunia and Trincomalee in Sri Lanka (1987-1988)
- Against J&K and Punjab terrorists, as NSG Force Commander (1990-1995)
- Volunteered for Kargil War, after retirement

He has received Commendation for Gallant Role in Counter Terrorist Operations.

== Education ==
Mishra holds an MA from Allahabad University, an M.Sc from Madras University and a PhD from Jiwaji University, Gwalior. He has five years’ postgraduate and graduate level teaching experience in College of Combat at Mhow and in Defence Services Staff College at Wellington. He also holds an LL.B. degree from University of Delhi.

== Military awards and decorations ==

General Service Medal 1947	Samar Seva Star	Poorvi Star	Special Service Medal
Raksha Medal	Sangram Medal	Operation Parakram Medal	Sainya Seva Medal
25th Anniversary of Independence Medal	30 Years Long Service Medal	20 Years Long Service Medal	9 Years Long Service Medal

Political offices
Preceded by Padmanabha Acharya	Governor of Arunachal Pradesh; 3 October 2017 – 15 February 2023	Succeeded by Kaiwalya Trivikram Parnaik
Preceded by Kambhampati Hari Babu	Governor of Mizoram; Additional Charge; 11 August 2021 - 6 November 2021	Succeeded by Kambhampati Hari Babu
Preceded by Satya Pal Malik	Governor of Meghalaya; Additional Charge; 5 October 2022 – 12 February 2023	Succeeded by Phagu Chauhan
Preceded by R. K. Mathur	Lieutenant Governor of Ladakh; 19 February 2023 – 17 July 2025	Succeeded by Kavinder Gupta
