= Dara Singh Chauhan =

Indian politician (born 1963)

Cabinet Minister for Prisons Government of Uttar Pradesh
- Incumbent
- Assumed office 5 March 2024
- Chief Minister: Yogi Adityanath
- Ministry & Departments: Prison
- Preceded by: Dharmveer Prajapati
- In office 19 March 2017 – 12 January 2022
- Chief Minister: Yogi Adityanath
- Ministry & Departments: Forest.; Environment; Zoological Garden
- Preceded by: Durga Prasad Yadav
- Succeeded by: Arun Kumar Saxena

Member of Uttar Pradesh Legislative Council
- Incumbent
- Assumed office 23 January 2024
- Preceded by: Dinesh Sharma
- Constituency: elected by Legislative Assembly members

Member of Uttar Pradesh Legislative Assembly
- In office 10 March 2022 – 15 July 2023
- Preceded by: Vijay Rajbhar
- Succeeded by: Sudhakar Singh
- Constituency: Ghosi
- In office 11 March 2017 – 12 January 2022
- Preceded by: Umesh Pandey
- Succeeded by: Ram Bilash Chauhan
- Constituency: Madhuban

Member of Parliament, Lok Sabha
- In office 16 May 2009 – 16 May 2014
- Preceded by: Chandradeo Prasad Rajbhar
- Succeeded by: Harinarayan Rajbhar
- Constituency: Ghosi

Member of Parliament, Rajya Sabha
- In office 3 April 2000 – 2 April 2006
- Constituency: Uttar Pradesh
- In office 30 November 1996 – 2 April 2000
- Constituency: Uttar Pradesh

Personal details
- Born: 25 July 1963 (age 63) Galvara, Azamgarh, Uttar Pradesh
- Party: Bharatiya Janata Party(2015–Jan 2022; July 2023–present)
- Other political affiliations: Indian National Congress (before 1996); Samajwadi Party (1996-2007), (January 2022-July 2023); Bahujan Samaj Party (2007-2015)
- Spouse: Disha Chauhan
- Children: 3
- Occupation: Politician

Dara Singh Chauhan (born 25 July 1963) is an Indian politician, currently serving as member of legislative council, and formerly represented the Madhuban (Assembly constituency) in Uttar Pradesh as a member of Bharatiya Janata Party. He was formerly a cabinet minister in first administration of Yogi Adityanath . He also represented Ghosi in the 15th Lok Sabha, when he was a leader of the Bahujan Samaj Party. In the 16th Lok Sabha election, he was defeated by Harinarayan Rajbhar, of the Bharatiya Janata Party, who won by more than 140,000 votes.

On 2 February 2015, he joined the Bharatiya Janata Party in the presence of party president Amit Shah in New Delhi.

Soon after he joined the BJP, he was made BJP Chauhan Morcha President and given the ticket to fight the assembly election from Madhuban constituency, where many people were competing to get BJP ticket. He won the seat by more than 30,000 votes and was able to build the presence of the BJP for first time in the constituency and became a cabinet minister in U.P. government.

== Early life and education ==
Chauhan was born 25 July 1963 in Galvara village of Azamgarh district, the son of Ram Kishan Chauhan. He married Disha Chauhan, they have two sons and two daughters. In 1980, he attended the Madhyamik Shikasha Parishad Allahabad and to complete his high school education. He is a prominent backward caste politician in Uttar Pradesh.

== Political career ==
Chauhan was elected Deputy Secretary in DAVPG College, Azamgarh as a student leader. After student politics, he remained active in mainstream politics as Indian National Congress office holder leader and subsequently joined Samajwadi Party in 1996 and was elected to the Rajya Sabha. He was a Rajya Sabha MP for two consecutive terms (1996-2000) and (2000-2006). He joined the Bahujan Samaj Party in 2007 after Mayawati became Chief Minister, following the fall of Mulayam Singh Yadav's government in Uttar Pradesh. In the general elections of 2009, he was elected to the Lok Sabha for the first time, defeating Chandradeo Prasad Rajbhar of the Samajwadi Party as a candidate of the Bahujan Samaj Party from Ghosi Lok Sabha constituency. In 2015, he joined the Bharatiya Janata Party, and fought the 2017 Uttar Pradesh Legislative Assembly election from the Madhuban assembly constituency. After the election he became Minister of Forest, Environment and Zoological Gardens in the Government of Uttar Pradesh. On 12 January 2022, he resigned from BJP and its ministry as he was aware that he would not be renominated by the BJP to fight election due to his non-performance. He joined the Samajwadi Party. On 15 July 2023, he resigned his MLA seat and left the Samajwadi Party and again joined the ruling BJP. In September 2023, he again contested as a BJP candidate from Ghosi (which fell vacant after his resignation) but lost the by-election by a substantial margin of 42,759 votes. The Samajwadi Party candidate Sudhakar Singh defeated him.

== Posts held ==
- 1996-2000 Member of Parliament in Rajya Sabha from Samajwadi Party
  - 1998-1999 Member, Committee on Petroleum and Natural Gas
  - 1998-2001 Member, Consultative Committee, Ministry of Coal
- 2000-2006 Member of Parliament in Rajya Sabha (2nd term) from Samajwadi Party
  - 2000-2004 Member, Committee on Energy
  - 2002-2004 Member, Consultative Committee, Ministry of Coal and Mines
  - 2004-2005 Member, Committee on Transport, Tourism and Culture
  - 2004 Member, Committee on Members of Parliament Local Area Development Scheme (Rajya Sabha)
  - 2004 Member, Consultative Committee, Ministry of Defence
  - 2005 Member, Committee on Energy
- 2009-2014 Member of Parliament in 15th Lok Sabha from Bahujan Samaj Party
  - Leader, Bahujan Samaj Parliamentary Party, Lok Sabha
  - 2009 Member, Business Advisory Committee
  - 2009 Member, Committee on Installation of Portraits/Statues of National Leaders and Parliamentarians in Parliament House Complex
  - 2009 Chairman, Committee on Social Justice and Empowerment
  - 2009 Member, Committee on Security in Parliament Complex
  - 2009 Member, Committee on Government Assurances
  - 2009 Member, General Purposes Committee
  - 2009 Member, Joint Committee on Office of Profit
- 2017-2022 MLA in 17th Legislative Assembly of Uttar Pradesh from Bhartiya Janata Party
  - 2017-2022 Minister of Forest and Environment in Yogi Adityanath ministry
- 2022-July 2023 MLA in 18th Uttar Pradesh Assembly from Samajwadi Party
- July 2023 Resigned from post of MLA and left Samajwadi Party and Joined Bharatiya Janata Party
