= Ghosi =

Indian town

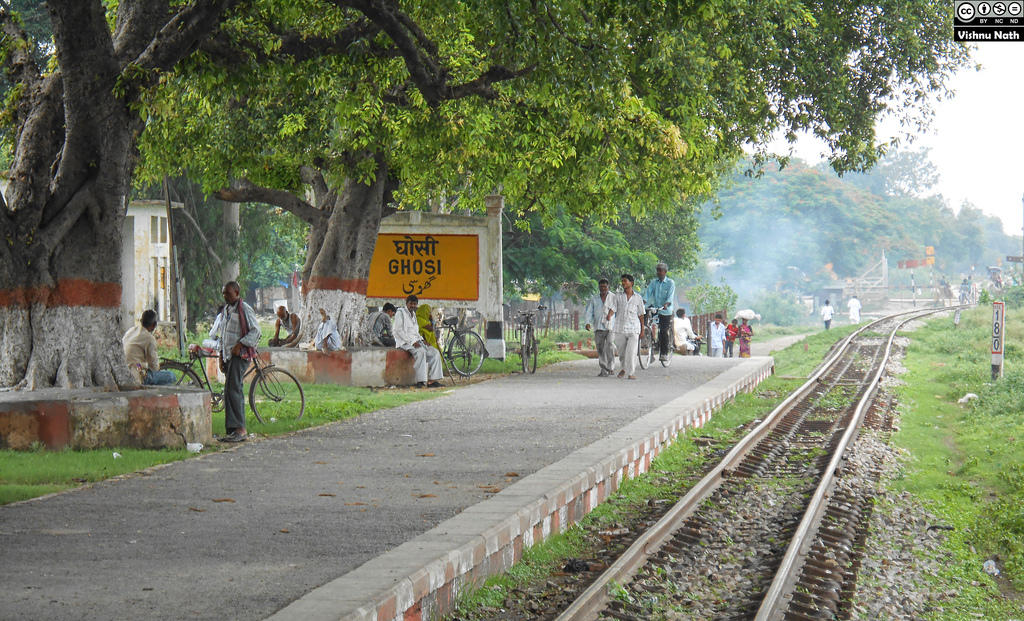
- Ghosi Railway Station

- Uttar Pradesh Situated
- Coordinates: 26.114°N 83.543°E
- Country: India
- State: Uttar Pradesh
- District: Mau District

Population (2011)
  - Total: 39,165

Languages
  - Prevalent: Hindi, Bhojpuri and Urdu
- Time zone: UTC+5:30 (Indian Standard Time)

Ghosi (گھوسی) is a Tehsil and a Nagar Panchayat in the Mau district of Uttar Pradesh, situated in the Purvanchal region. Sadrushshariah Mufti Amjad Ali Aazmi hailed from the area. Ghosi was formerly a part of the Azamgarh district but became a part of Mau when the district was created in 1988. It is well connected with Mau, Gorakhpur, Azamgarh, and Varanasi, and has a rich cultural, educational, and political background.

== History ==
Ghosi has been a hub of Islamic scholarship and Sufi culture. It has several Dargahs and places with a significant history and story.

=== Early and late Medieval History (14th - early 19th century) ===
In the early Medieval period Ghosi was home to members of the Bhar community who were concentrated in the area. Later in the 15th century the Sharqi dynasty of Jaunpur Sultanate extended their authority into the region, which was later re-absorbed into Delhi Sultanate under the Lodi Dynasty and local Afghan chiefs of Jaunpur and Bengal. Following Babur’s victory at the Battle of Ghaghra in 1529, Ghosi and the wider Azamgarh-Mau region were brought under Mughal control by 1530 during the reign of Babur and Humayun. During the rule of Akbar the area surrounding Ghosi was brought into the Allahabad administrative Subah, under the Sarkar of Jaunpur. It is mentioned in Ain-i-Akhbari that under the Sarkar of Jaunpur, present‑day Muhammadabad Gohna was an important feudal and agricultural seat of administration. The neighboring parganas of Ghosi and Majhwarah later became a centre of Bhumihar zamindari influence under the Nawabs of Awadh and the East India Company. The Bhumihars are still a major land holding community in the region and held the entirety of the Surajpur pargana near Dohri Ghat. Following the Battle of Buxar in 1764, the region came under the control of the East India Company.

=== Mordern History (19th-20th Century) ===
During British Rule in the 19th century many indigo factories were set up at Bahadurpur (near Dohrighat) by European owners, in common with many other places in the Azamgarh division. Later Ghosi was an anti-colonial stronghold, with notable contributions from freedom fighters such as Jharkhande Rai and Algu Rai Shastri. Algu Rai Shastri was active in Amila Kand (1942) during the Quit India Movement. The British had earlier burnt his house which caused a tremendous uprising in the region. On 15th of August 1942 in Amila, hundreds of revolutionaries under the direction of Radhe Rai, Ramchandra Rai, Baldev Rai, Pateshwari Rai were involved in violent resistance against colonial rule. Later on Pateshwari Rai was imprisoned for 2 years and was given 15 lashes, Ramshankar Rai was imprisoned for 6 months.

=== Brigadier Mohammad Usman ===
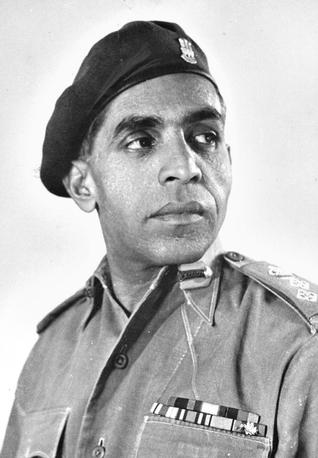
Muhammad Usman (Brigadier)

Brigadier Mohammad Usman, MVC (15 July 1912 – 3 July 1948) was a war hero who fought in the Indo-Pakistani War of 1947. He was from Bibipur village in Ghosi Tehsil. He was the highest ranking officer of the Indian Army killed in action during the was. A Muslim he decided to stay in India after the Partition in 1947, rejecting offers to join the Pakistani Army. His leadership and sacrifice at the Battle of Nowshera earned him the title “Lion of Nowshera” and he was posthumously awarded the Maha Vir Chakra, India’s second‑highest military decoration. Indian Prime Minister Jawaharlal Nehru and his Cabinet colleagues attended the funeral of Usman — "the highest ranking military commander till date" to lay down his life in the battlefield. He was given a state funeral.

== Education ==
Renowned madrasas like Jamia Amjadia Razvia & Niswan, Jamia Shams ul Uloom & Niswan, Madarasa Badr ul Uloom, Madarasa Ehsan ul Uloom, Madarasa tul Madina (Dawateislami) and other educational institutions like Sarvodaya College, Ram Lagan College, Shms ul Uloom Inter College and Jaish Kisan College have given Ghose the reputation of being a centre for religious as well as modern education.

== Area ==
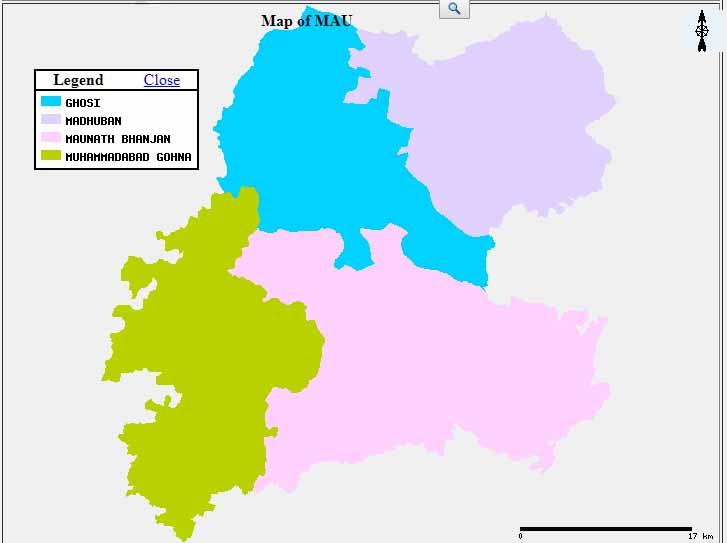
Tehsil Map of Mau

The Ghosi Subdivision comprises a total of 328 villages. The area plays a crucial role in the overall administration and rural development of Mau District. It is an important wheat and barley growing region and one of the most productive pargana recorded in colonial times in Azamgarh division. Ghosi subdivision has a total area of 41,530.16 hectares. Their Census village codes range from 196063 to 196407. The major highways in the area are National Highway 227A (NH227A) and National Highway 727A (NH727A).

The rivers frlowing through this area which provide waters through canals are Ghaghara and Rapti.

== Population ==
=== Ghosi Nagar Panchayat ===
The population of children aged 0-6 is 5934 which is 15.15% of total population of Ghosi (NP). In Ghosi Nagar Panchayat, the female sex ratio is 945 against state average of 912. Moreover, the child sex ratio in Ghosi is around 955 compared to Uttar Pradesh state average of 902. The literacy rate of Ghosi Town is 77.65% higher than the state average of 67.68%. In Ghosi, male literacy is around 83.40% while the female literacy rate is 71.55%. Ghosi Nagar Panchayat has total administration over 5,170 houses to which it supplies basic amenities like water and sewerage. It is also authorize to build roads within Nagar Panchayat limits and impose taxes on properties coming under its jurisdiction.

== Religion ==
=== Ghosi Nagar Panchayat ===
According to the official 2011 Census, Islam is the majority religion in the Ghosi Nagar Panchayat, accounting for 61.41% of the total population. Hinduism is the second-largest religion, practiced by 38.39% of the residents

Ghosi Nagar Panchayat – Religious Composition
1. Hindu (38.4%)
2. Muslim (61.4%)
3. Others (0.19%)
4. Other (0.01%)

=== Ghosi Tehsil ===
Ghosi Subdivision (tehsil) Religious Composition
1. Hindu (87.2%)
2. Muslim (12.4%)
3. Others (0.33%)
4. Other (0.00%)

== Economy ==
Economically, most people are engaged in textile and power loom industry. Along with this agriculture, small-scale businesses, and teaching also provide employment opportunities to people from Ghosi.

Politically, Ghosi is a well-known constituency of Lok Sabha and the Uttar Pradesh Legislative Assembly. It has produced several notable leaders who gained state and even national prominence. Among them are Kalpnath Rai, who served briefly as the Human Resources Minister and Power Minister of State and he was active in politics during 1960s till his death in 1999 and he was originally from this region. In more recent years, leaders like Phagu Chauhan (former Governor of Bihar and Meghalaya), and Dara Singh Chauhan have represented the Ghosi constituency and having a known personality in Indian politics. Its voters are seen as influential in shaping Purvanchal's political landscape.

== Notable people ==
- Rajeev Rai (Born 1969) MP from Ghosi (2024–present), strategist for SP in 2012 elections.
- Jharkhande Rai (1914-1984) Indian Freedom fighter (HSRA member), Former Cabinet Minister for Food in Uttar Pradesh, MLA (1952–68), Lok Sabha MP (1967–71, 1971–77, 1980–84), Food Minister in Charan Singh’s 1967 UP govt, Former Vice-president of U.P. Kisan Sabha, Former CPI member.
- Kalpnath Rai (1941-1999) Former MP from Ghosi (1989–96), Union Minister of State for Power, Food, Energy, and Parliamentary Affairs, Former INC member.
- Algu Rai Shastri (1900-1987) Indian Freedom fighter, First MP of the newly created Ghosi constituency (1957-1962), Former INC member.
