= International Center for Promotion of Enterprises =

Intergovernmental organization

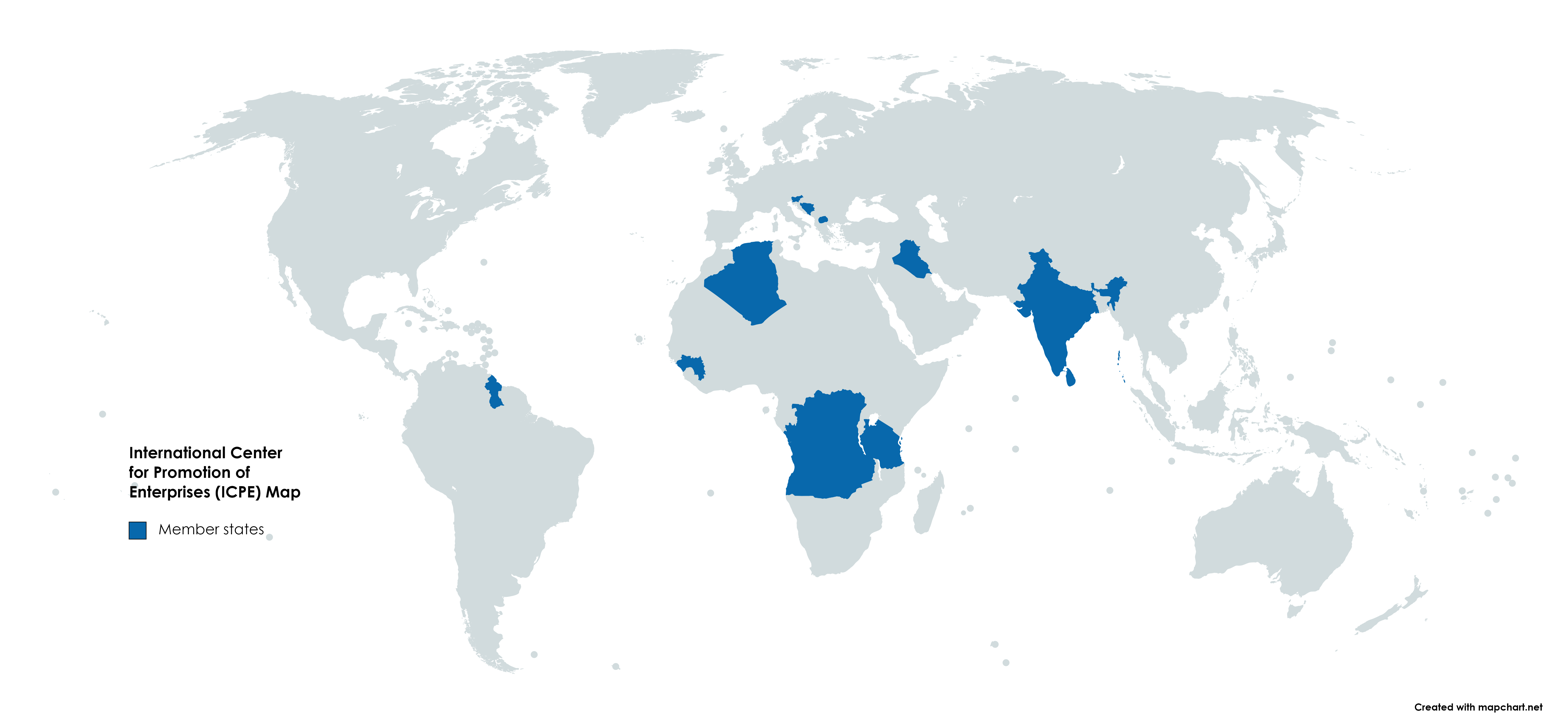
International Center for Promotion of Enterprises ICPE Map

The International Center for Promotion of Enterprises (ICPE) is an intergovernmental organization, established on the initiative of the United Nations, mandated to pursue and promote international cooperation in areas related to public sector management, sustainable entrepreneurship, sustainable development and promotion of knowledge-based societal change.

The ICPE is an intergovernmental organization located in Ljubljana, Slovenia and has 14 member states from Latin America, Asia, Africa and Europe. The ICPE functions as a research hub for member states (developing countries) and other partners, facilitating the exchange of ideas and practices between counterparts from different world regions.

The ICPE has been publishing the refereed international journal Public Enterprise for over 30 years and has produced over 50 other publications in cooperation with the World Bank, ILO and UNIDO, all of which are available internationally.

== Origins ==
The ICPE traces its origins to the International Center for Public Enterprises in Developing Countries set up on a UN initiative in 1974, which was reconstituted as an intergovernmental organization in 1980 with more than 40 developing countries as its member states and Yugoslavia as the host country. In 1997 the name was changed to International Center for Promotion of Enterprises by a Resolution of the ICPE Assembly in keeping up with the changed economic and political priorities of the new host country, Slovenia.

== Organization ==
The center is governed by its statute which is also incorporated in a Slovenian law. According to Article 6 of the statute, only developing countries can be members of the center. The headquarter agreement between the center and the host country is also incorporated in a Slovenian law. The organs of the center are the executive-director, the Assembly and the council. The Executive Director is elected by the Assembly on the recommendation of the council. The Executive Director is the chief executive officer of the center with full powers to administer the center under the instructions of the council. The post of Executive Director is currently held by David Tavželj.

=== Assembly ===
The Assembly is the supreme organ of the center and is composed of delegates representing the members of the center. Its purpose is to:

- formulate policy and lay down general guidelines for the work of the center;
- adopt mid-term and two-year programs for work of the center and evaluate its functioning, including financial operations;
- determine the regular contributions of members for financing the adopted program of work of the center;
- decide on amendments to the present Statute;
- approve the rules of regulating the financial operations of the center;
- decide, on recommendations of the council, on the admission of new members and observers;
- elect members of the council;
- elect the executive-director of the center;
- consider any other matters relating to the objective and activities of the center.

Member country Bosnia and Herzegovina is the current president of the Assembly.

=== Council ===
The council is the most important organ of the center. The role of the council is to:

- propose to the Assembly long-term and mid-term programs of work of the center and propose the financing of these programs;
- supervise the implementation of the accepted programs and the functioning of the center;
- in conjunction with the executive-director of the center, adopt the measures necessary to implement the program of work of the center and to put into effect the other conclusions and recommendations of the Assembly;
- approve the annual budget of the center presented by the executive-director;
- undertake necessary steps for timely and regular payment of membership contributions to the center;
- consider requests for admission of new members and submit recommendations to this effect to the Assembly;
- examine the reports of the executive-director on the functioning and activities of the center;
- call for special reports from the executive-director when necessary;
- adopt general regulations concerning the organization, composition and terms of employment of the professional personnel of the center and the conditions for cooperation with external experts;
- approve the rules concerning the rights and duties of the administrative and technical staff of the center;
- perform any other function entrusted to it by the Assembly.

The current president of the ICPE Council is Member State Republic of Slovenia. Late Dr Anton Vratuša was the council's honorary president until dying in 2017.

== International cooperation ==
The ICPE maintains close contacts with UN programs and agencies, especially with UNIDO in Vienna, UNCTAD in Geneva, the international finance institutions (IFIs) and the EU.

In 2009, the work of the ICPE was highlighted in a number of EU strategic documents, including the EU-Brazil Summit and the 2009 EU-India Summit. the then Director General Stefan Bogdan Šalej was awarded Order of the Sun, the highest award bestowed by the nation of Peru. A variety of research and consultancy projects were undertaken with regional and national chambers of industry and commerce as well as universities, private and public enterprises and other institutions around the world including those in non-member states. The ICPE continues to engage itself with institutions in member states as also countries outside the ICPE's membership.

== Activities ==
=== Global seminars and expert group meetings ===
The ICPE hosts frequent conferences, seminars and expert group meetings, providing a platform for the exchange of ideas and best practices among practitioners, academics and other stakeholders. The aim of these meetings is to facilitate shifts in the way governments and enterprises address their most important governance and leadership challenges.

=== A global training and research hub ===
One- to four-week modules bringing together participants from different global regions for in-depth immersion on a given subject. The first half of the module is typically conducted at the ICPE headquarters in Ljubljana, while the second half takes participants on a tour of businesses and international organizations in different European countries.

=== Projects ===
The ICPE conducts research and consulting for the benefit of member states, affiliate members and other partners. The center works with partners to secure requisite project and program funding from Development banks, IFIs, the EU and others.
