= Rapti River =

Rapti River may refer to one of two rivers in Nepal and India:

- East Rapti River
- West Rapti River
