= Amjad Ali Aazmi =

Indian Islamic scholar (1882–1948)

- أمجد على أعظمى

Personal life
- Born: November 9, 1882 Ghosi, Mau district, Uttar Pradesh, India
- Died: 6 September 1948 (aged 65)
- Children: Abdul Mustafa al-Azhari; Ziaul Mustafa
- Parent: Mawlawi Hakim Jamaluddin (father)
- Era: Contemporary
- Notable works: Bahar-e-Shariat; Fatawa Amjadia
- Other names: Sadr al-Sharia, Badr al-Tariqa

Religious life
- Religion: Islam
- Denomination: Sunni
- Jurisprudence: Hanafi
- Movement: Barelvi

Muslim leader
- Predecessor: Ahmed Raza Khan
- Successor: Mustafa Raza Khan

Amjad Ali Aazmi (1882 – 1948), reverentially known as Sadr al-Sharia and Badr al-Tariqa, was an Indian Islamic scholar, jurist and writer.

== Biography ==
Amjad Ali Aazmi was born in 1882, in Mohalla Karimuddin Pur, Ghosi, Mau, Uttar Pradesh, India. His father's Hakim Jamaluddin Ansari and grandfather were scholars of Islamic theology and Unani medicine. Aazmi was one of the foremost students of Ahmad Raza Khan, studying at Manzar-e-Islam in Bareilly.

Amjad Ali Aazmi died in 1948 in Bombay, and was buried at Ghosi in Uttar Pradesh, India.

== Books ==
- Bahar-e-Shariat
- Fatawa Amjadiyya
- Islami Akhlaq-O-Adaab
- Ada e Haj O Umrah

== See also ==
- List of Hanafis
- List of Sufis
