= Atul Rai =

Indian politician

Atul
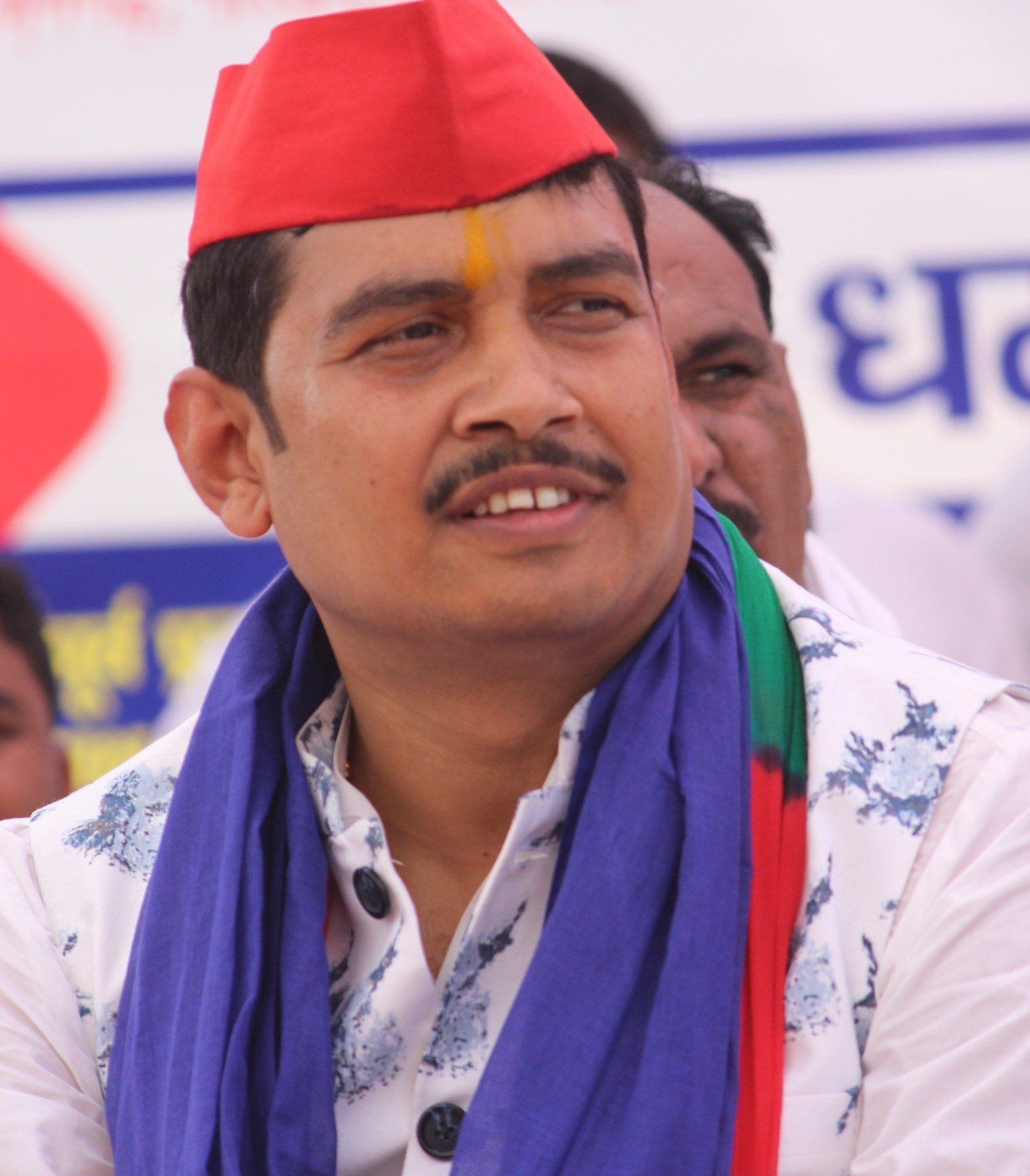

Personal details
- Born: 5 July 1982 (age 44) Ghazipur, Uttar Pradesh, India
- Citizenship: Indian
- Party: Bahujan Samaj Party
- Occupation: Politician and businessman

Atul is an Indian politician and a former member of Parliament from the Ghosi constituency in Uttar Pradesh. According to his election filing he had assets worth more than 60,000,000 rupees.

== Early life ==
Atul Rai was born on 20 February 1982 in Birpur village of Ghazipur district in Uttar Pradesh in a Bhumihar family. His father, Bharat Singh Rai, was an employee of Diesel Locomotive Works in Varanasi. Atul got his early education from Kendriya Vidyalaya, DLW, Varanasi. He graduated from Harish Chandra Postgraduate College, Varanasi. After graduation, he started his own business.

His brother is Pawan Kumar Rai, and his wife is Priyanka Singh.

== Political career ==
Atul Rai joined Bahujan Samaj Party in 2015. He contested the assembly election of Uttar Pradesh in 2017 from Zamania (Assembly constituency) and garnered 67,559 votes. In his first election, he lost a close contest with 9,264 votes.

In the 2019 General Lok sabha election, Atul Rai Contested the Parliament election from Ghosi Loksabha Constituency and won the election by a margin of 122000+votes.

He was dropped in 2024.

== Rape allegations ==
In May 2019, a woman accused Atul Rai of rape at his home in Varanasi. Mr. Rai, who denied the accusation, was arrested a month later and has been in jail since then.

In November 2020, Atul Rai's brother registered a police complaint accusing the victim of committing forgery. The woman called the accusations as harassment and an attempt to force her to withdraw the rape charge. However, the court, in August 2021, issued a non-bailable arrest warrant against her.

In desperation, the woman and a male friend travelled from their state in Uttar Pradesh to the capital, Delhi, and on 16 August 2021, self-immolated themselves outside India's Supreme Court. They were live on Facebook as they sprinkled petrol on themselves and lit the fire. Before setting themselves alight, the duo named several police officials, including then SSP Varanasi Amit Pathak and CO Bhelupur Amrendra Singh, and a judge of MPMLA court Prayagraj, accusing them of conspiring with Mr. Rai.

The man died at the hospital on Saturday, 21 August 2021. The woman succumbed to her death on the evening of Tuesday, 24 August 2021.

After this incident, the Yogi Adityanath government registered an FIR against Rai and ex-IPS Amitabh Thakur, who had announced to contest the election against Yogi Adityanath while leaving everyone else. Thakur was arrested immediately after the registration of the FIR in a highly contentious manner. Thakur called this a targeted and selective political vendetta. The case is presently in Court.
