= Jharkhande Rai =

Indian politician

Babu Jharkhande Rai was an Indian Communist politician and one of the pillars of the Communist Party of India in Purvanchal, Uttar Pradesh. He was elected to the 4th Lok Sabha, 5th Lok Sabha and 7th Lok Sabha in 1967, 1971 and 1980 from Ghosi constituency. He held the seat till he died on 17 March 1984. Till the late 1980s, the communist movement in eastern U.P. was a major force to reckon with. It drew wide support from a largely agrarian society, in which neither religion nor caste was a factor and Jharkhande Rai represented the aspirations of the toiling masses.

== Early life and education ==
Jharkhande Rai was son of late Shri Radhe Rai born at Amila Village in a bhumihar family, Azamgarh District in 1914. For education he took admission at Government High School, Basti and Government Jubilee High School, Gorakhpur. He completed his graduation from Ewing Christian College, Allahabad and Allahabad University. He married Smt. Kamla Devi in 1926 and he had 1 son and 1 daughter. By profession he was an agriculturist and social & political worker. He was previously associated with Hindustan Socialist Republican Army (H.S.R.A.) and Revolutionary Socialist Party; suffered imprisonment for 8 years during the British regime; sentenced to imprisonment for 21 years for taking part in Pipridih Conspiracy case, Ghazipur Arms Conspiracy Case and Lucknow Conspiracy Case and was released after Independence. He was imprisoned 18 times after Independence.

== Positions held ==
1. Cabinet Minister for Food, Uttar Pradesh Sanyukta Vidayak Dal Government in 1967 led by Charan Singh and resigned from the Cabinet owing to differences on the issue of distribution of land to landless.

2. President, (i) Intermediate College, Amila Aramgarh and (ii) Intermediate College, Sonadih, Aramgarh

3. Treasurer, All India Kisan Sabha, Feroz Shah Road, New Delhi

4. Vice-president, U.P. Kisan Sabha, Lucknow;

4. Member, Uttar Pradesh Legislative Assembly, 1952-68 from Goshi Vidhan Sabha

5. Chairman, Public Accounts Committee, U.P. Legislative Assembly for 21- years

6. Member, (i) Fourth Lok Sabha, 1968–71 and (ii) Fifth Lok Sabha, 1971–77. (iii) Seventh Lok sabha 1980–1984

== Social activities ==
Library work; relief work; emancipation movements of down-trodden.

== Publications ==
Written several books on History and Political Subjects, e.g., (i) August Vidroh, (ii) Krantikari Janvadi, (iii) Bhumi Sudhar Aur Bhumi Andolan, (iv) Gopalan Ke Naam Khula Patra, (v) Pant Shahi Ko Chunoti, (vi) Kranti Kariyun Ke Sansmaran, (vii) Bharatiya Krantikari Andolan Ek Vishleshan and (viii) Netaji Subhash Chandra Bose.
