= Phagu Chauhan =

Indian politician (born 1948)

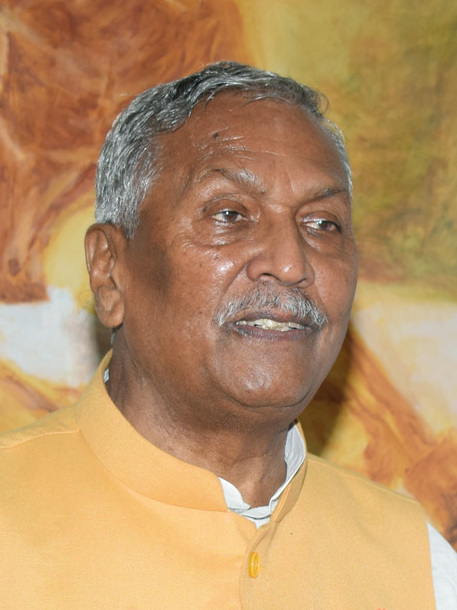
- Chauhan c. 2019

20th Governor of Meghalaya
- In office 12 February 2023 – 30 July 2024
- Chief Minister: Conrad Sangma
- Preceded by: B. D. Mishra (additional charge)
- Succeeded by: C. H. Vijayashankar

40th Governor of Bihar
- In office 29 July 2019 - 12 February 2023
- Chief Minister: Nitish Kumar
- Preceded by: Lalji Tandon
- Succeeded by: Rajendra Arlekar

Member of Legislative Assembly for Ghosi
- In office March 2017 – July 2019
- Preceded by: Shudhakar Singh
- In office October 1996 – March 2012
- Preceded by: Achaibar Bharti
- Succeeded by: Shudhakar Singh
- In office June 1991 – December 1992
- Preceded by: Subhash
- Succeeded by: Achaibar Bharti
- In office March 1985 – November 1989
- Preceded by: Kedar
- Succeeded by: Subhash
- Constituency: Ghosi, Mau

Personal details
- Born: 1 January 1948 (age 78) Sekhupur, United Provinces, India
- Party: Bharatiya Janata Party
- Other political affiliations: National Democratic Alliance
- Spouse: Muhari Devi
- Children: 7
- Education: Graduate
- Profession: Politician; agriculturist

Phagu Chauhan (born 1 January 1948) is an Indian politician who served as the 20th Governor of Meghalaya. He previously served as the 29th Governor of Bihar. He is a former member of 17th Legislative Assembly of Uttar Pradesh from Ghosi, a seat he won a record six times, representing various parties like Lok Dal, Bahujan Samaj Party and Bharatiya Janata Party.

== Personal life ==
Chauhan was born on 1 January 1948 in the village of Sekhupur in Azamgarh district of present-day Uttar Pradesh to Kharpattu Chauhan. He is a graduate. Chauhan is married to Muhari Devi, with whom he has three sons and four daughters.

== Political career ==
Chauhan started his political career in 1985 from the political party Dalit Mazdoor Kisan Party and became first time MLA in his political career. After that he contested many Legislative Assembly (Vidhan Sabha) elections from different parties and won maximum number of times. In 2017 Uttar Pradesh Assembly Election he contested as Bharatiya Janata Party candidate from Ghosi and defeated his close contestant Abbas Ansari from Bahujan Samaj Party with a margin of 7,003 votes.

In July 2019, Chauhan was appointed the 43rd Governor of Bihar.

During his tenure as Governor of Bihar and also ex-officio Chancellor of State Universities, many universities got tangled into multiple scams which came into light after Bihar Government's Special Vigilance Unit raids. One of which Magadh University's case was most peculiar as Vice Chancellor Rajendra Prasad was booked under Section 420 of IPC for ₹30 Crore fraud. His homes were raided which was first for a VC of university. Chauhan as Chancellor of the university didn't sack the VC who also hails from UP as does Chauhan which fueled some speculations. The VC went on medical leave and thus leaving the position de facto vacant. He said the vigilance raids were not good for the university as it created environment of fear. VC, Exam Controller along with other staff were brought from other universities and given additional charge. Due to all this Magadh University's academic session suffered longest delays in recent times as multiple exams are pending. Multiple protests erupted over these issues in which effigies of the Governor were burnt which in itself is new as Governor is a respected constitutional position. Students of this university expressed their frustration to Governor Chauhan over delayed session and exams not being conducted and demanded permanent vice chancellor and staff or his resignation.

== Posts held ==
| # | Portrait | Took office | Left office | Term length | Position | Party | Ref |
|---|---|---|---|---|---|---|---|
| 1 | | February 2023 | July 2024 | 1 year, 7 months | Governor of Meghalaya | – (BJP and NDA as support) | – |
| 2 | | July 2019 | February 2023 | 3 years, 6 months | Governor of Bihar | – (BJP and NDA as support) | |
| 3 | | March 2017 | July 2019 | 2 years, 4 months | Member, 17th Legislative Assembly | BJP | |
| 4 | | May 2007 | March 2012 | 4 years, 10 months | Member, 15th Legislative Assembly | BSP | |
| 5 | | February 2002 | May 2007 | 5 years, 3 months | Member, 14th Legislative Assembly | BJP | |
| 6 | | October 1996 | March 2002 | 5 years, 5 months | Member, 13th Legislative Assembly | BJP | |
| 7 | | June 1991 | December 1992 | 1 year, 5 monthe | Member, 11th Legislative Assembly | JD | |
| 8 | | March 1985 | November 1989 | 4 years, 6 months | Member, 9th Legislative Assembly | DMKP | |

== See also ==
- Uttar Pradesh Legislative Assembly
- Governor (India)
- List of Governors of Bihar
- List of Governors of Meghalaya

Political offices
| Preceded by Lalji Tandon | Governor of Bihar; 29 July 2019 - 13 February 2023 | Succeeded by Rajendra Arlekar |
| Preceded by B. D. Mishra; Additional Charge | Governor of Meghalaya; 13 February 2023 - Present | Incumbent |
