= Bhadsa Manopur, Mau =

Bhadsa Manopur
- Village
- Location in Uttar Pradesh, India Bhadsa Manopur (India)
- Coordinates: 26.037304°N 83.566586°E
- Country: India
- State: Uttar Pradesh
- District: Mau
- Tehsil: Maunath Bhanjan

Government
  - Type: Panchayati raj (India)
  - Body: Gram panchayat

Languages
  - Official: Hindi
  - Other spoken: Bhojpuri
- Time zone: UTC+5:30 (IST)
- Pin code: 275304
- Telephone code: 05464
- Vehicle registration: UP-54
- Website: up.gov.in

Bhadsa Manopur is a village located in Maunath Bhanjan tehsil of Mau district, Uttar Pradesh. It has total 494 families residing. Bhadsa Manopur has population of 3,623 as per government records. This village is located at a distance of 11 km towards north from district headquarter Mau. The village is well connected with nearby towns as it situated on the Varanasi-Gorakhpur Highway.

In earlier times, the population was primarily involved in farming, but now people have moved to other jobs. The literacy rate of this village is also quite high as compared with the state average which resulted in the shift from agriculture as primary source of income.

== Administration ==
Bhadsa Manopur village is administrated by Pradhan who is elected representative of village as per constitution of India and Panchyati Raaj Act. This village comes under Kopaganj development block.

Particulars	Total	Male	Female
Total No. of Houses	494		
Population	3623	1896	1727

== Nearby places ==
- Azamgarh
- Barhalganj
- Dohrighat
- Ghosi
- Gorakhpur
- Kasara, Mau
- Kopaganj
- Mau
- Shahroj, Mau
