= North Manchester Jamia Mosque =

Mosque in Manchester, England

Coordinates: 53.5106°N 2.2431°W

North Manchester Jamia Mosque and College of Islamic Studies
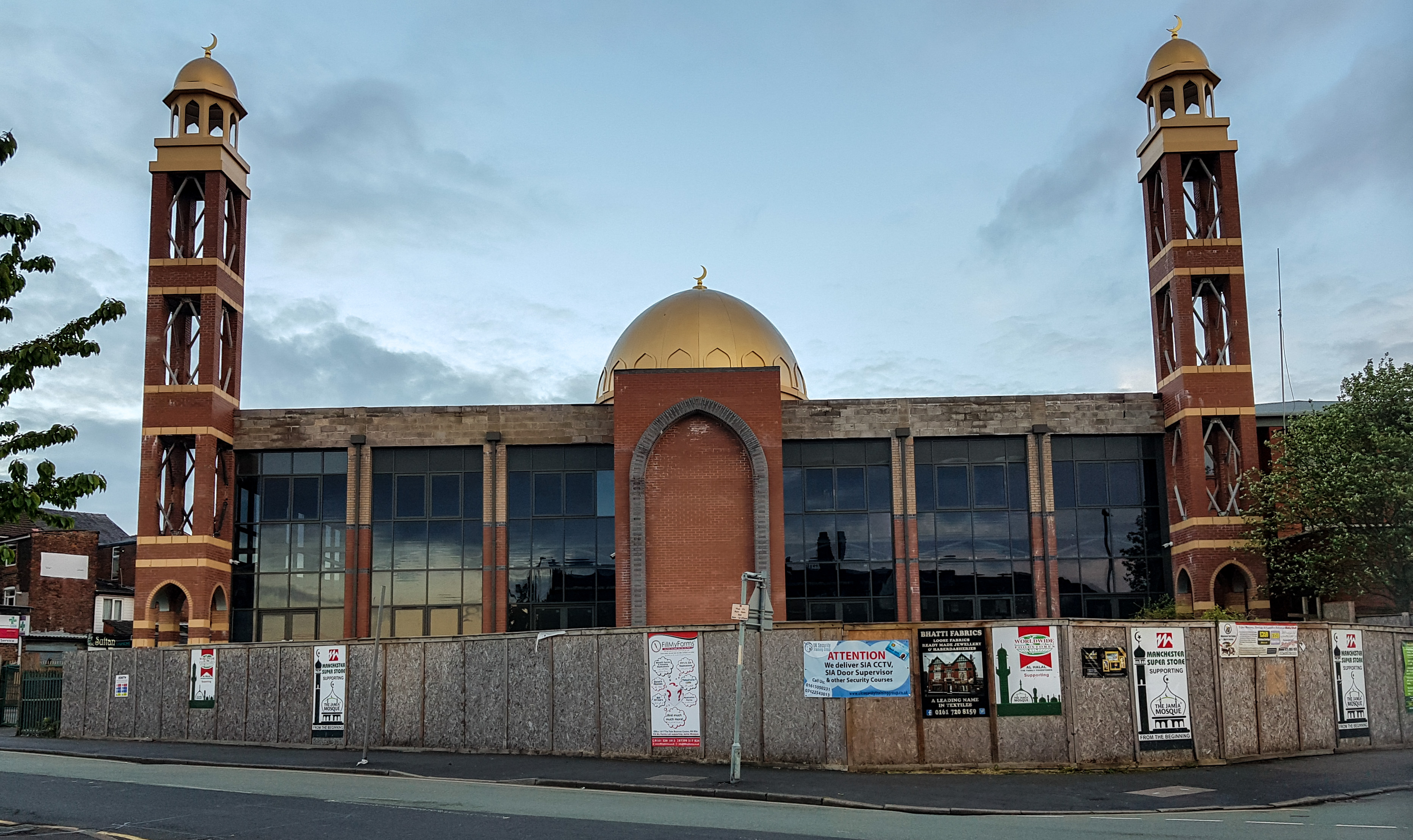

Religion
- Affiliation: Islam
- Branch/tradition: Sunni

Location
- Location: 3 Woodlands Road, Cheetham Hill, Manchester, M8 9LF, UK. Tel: 0161 740 3696
- Interactive map of North Manchester Jamia Mosque and College of Islamic Studies

Architecture
- Type: Mosque

Website
- Official website

North Manchester Jamia Mosque is a mosque (Arabic: مسجد جمعيه شمال مانشستر ) in the Cheetham Hill area of Manchester, run under the headship of Qamaruzzaman Azmi by the Ibadur-Rahman Trust. It is one of the largest Muslim centres in Europe.

The mosque is open to all, and its main prayer halls currently hold between 2,500 and 3,000 people during a Friday service, with over 15,000 worshippers walking through the Mosque's doors during the multiple services held on the religious festivals of Eid.

== History ==
The North Manchester Jamia Mosque was started in 1975 by Qamaruzzaman Azmi, an Islamic thinker, orator, and writer.

In 1975, Azmi began giving Dars-e-Quran at Shah Jalal Mosque (1A Eileen Grove, Rusholme) near Wilmslow Road, Manchester by travelling from Bradford every week. At that time, there were few Sunni Mosques in Manchester. Within a short period of time, the Victoria Park Mosque appointed a Sunni Imam.

In 1979, the North Manchester Jamia Mosque started off under the leadership of Azmi at 25 Bellot Street, Cheetham Hill, Manchester which was a house converted into a mosque. As the facilities at this building were very limited and the growing population of Muslims needed facilities for Islamic activities on a larger scale, a plot of land was purchased in 1982 and the first phase of the mosque, consisting of the main prayer hall providing prayer facilities for 1,200 men and women, was completed in 1984. The second phase consisting of a College of Islamic Studies and additional prayer facilities for 1,200 people was built in the 1990s.

The current third phase of the project is a major complex that will allow the mosque to hold prayer facilities for up to 10,000 people, a community hall, Imams' residence, a mortuary, office, library, and guest rooms.

== Impact ==
Since its establishment, North Manchester Jamia Mosque remains the primary Muslim organisation in the north of Manchester and a focal point for the Manchester Muslim community, providing education for children and adults, lectures and seminars, mortuary, library along with daily prayer facilities. Professor Waqar Ahmed, who is the Chair of Nanotechnology and Advanced Manufacturing and Head of Institute of Nanotechnology and Bioengineering as well as Leader of Nanomedicine and Nanoengineering Research Group at the University of Central Lancashire, wrote in the book Tajalliyat-e-Qamar:

Prime Minister David Cameron along with Faiths Minister Baroness Sayeeda Warsi met with Chief Imam of the North Manchester Jamia Mosque, Allama Qamaruzzaman Azmi. It was his first visit to a UK mosque since he took power. Baroness Warsi said: “Jamia Mosque is a fantastic example of a model Mosque that reaches out to its community, providing vital services to the local Muslim population."

== Students of the College ==
There are well over 200 students enrolled at different levels. Scholars of the college include Waqar Azmi, UK Government's former Chief Diversity Adviser, Cabinet Office.

== See also ==
- Qamaruzzaman Azmi
- Al-Jame-atul-Islamia
- World Islamic Mission
- Azmi (disambiguation)
- Azamgarh
