= Yaseen Akhtar Misbahi =

Indian Sunni scholar (1953–2023)

Personal life
- Born: 1953 Azamgarh, Uttar Pradesh, India
- Died: 7 May 2023 (aged 69–70)
- Known for: Qadri Mosque, Delhi

Religious life
- Religion: Islam
- Denomination: Sunni
- Jurisprudence: Hanafi
- Creed: Maturidi
- Movement: Barelvi

Yaseen Akhtar Misbahi (1953 – 7 May 2023) was an Indian Sunni Sufi Islamic scholar and journalist, associated with the Raza Academy. He was the vice-president of the All India Muslim Personal Law Board and the chairman of All India Muslim Majlis-e-Mushawarat. He was an alumnus of Al Jamiatul Ashrafia and authored books including Angrez-nawazi ki Haqeeqat.

== Early life and education ==
Misbahi was born in 1953 in Khalispur, Adari, Mau, Uttar Pradesh , India. He received his religious education at Al Jamiatul Ashrafia, and graduated in 1970. He enrolled at the Lucknow University for a B.A. and then shifted to study Arabic and Persian Board exams at the Allahabad Board. He went to Saudi Arabia during 1982–84 for extensive study of the Arabic language.

== Career ==
During his studies in Allahabad, Misbahi taught Arabic language at a local madrasa, and subsequently taught Arabic literature at his alma mater, Al Jamiatul Ashrafia. He taught Islamiyat in the Department of Islamic Studies, Jamia Millia Islamia from 1988 to 1990.

Misbahi established the Qadri Mosque in Zakir Nagar, New Delhi. He was affiliated with Raza Academy and served as the vice-president of All India Muslim Personal Law Board. He founded Al-Jamiatul Qadria in Jogabai Extension, Okhla, and chaired Darul Qalam, a research and writing house, that he had established in 1991. He also served as the chairman of the All India Muslim Majlis-e-Mushawarat.

On 23 July 2015, Delhi Police special cell called him to Okhla Jamia Nagar police station and questioned him at another location. Zakir Nagar residents, led by local politicians, gathered in protest outside Jamia Nagar police station. His detention was protested by local residents of the area and later Police released him with respect and apologised.

== Views ==
Misbahi stated about the community-run Shairah courts in India that, "If they help in solving the problems related to a particular community, no one should object." He expressed that Indian Muslims should proudly call themselves Indians and stated that "Indian Muslims are against every form of terror whether physical or theoretical." He believed that Muslims in India were living in a safe haven in comparison to many Muslim-majority countries.

Misbahi was of the view that, that Lashkar-e-Tayyiba, Jaish-e-Muhammad, Al-Qaida and ISIS are perpetrating atrocities, brazenly violating Islam in the name of Islam, Jihad and Khilafat. In a national seminar organised to condemn terrorism in New Delhi, he stated, "We also proclaim that they have nothing to do with the peace-loving and pluralistic Indian Muslims who are vehemently opposed to the handful terrorist goons".

Misbahi criticised the Indian National Congress and regarded it as prejudiced against Muslims. In his words, "Successive Congress prime ministers had only exploited the Muslims without ensuring benefits of development for them".

== Works ==
Misbahi was a journalist and edited a monthly magazine titled Kanzul Iman. In 2015, the Delhi Police had detained him for questioning due to his book 24 Ayat Ka Qurani Mafhoom. His other works include:

- Ahle Sunnat Ka Taaruf By Allama Yaseen Misbahi
- Angrez-nawazi ki Haqeeqat
- Chand Mumtāz ʻUlamā-yi Inqilāb 1857
- Imām Aḥmad Raz̤ā arbāb-i ʻilm o Dānish kī Naẓar men̲
- Khaleej ka Bahran
- Shaarih-e-Bukhari
- ″Al-Madih-un-Nabvi Arabic
- ″Gunbad-e-Khizra Urdu
- ″Imam Ahmad Raza Ki Fiqhi Basirat Urdu
- ″Imam Ahmad Raza Ki Muhaddisana Azmat Urdu
- ″Islahe Fikro Aitiqad Urdu
- ″Jashn-e-Milad-un-Nabi Urdu
- ″Mooe Mubarak Urdu
- ″Muarife Kanzul Iman Urdu
- ″Muslim Personal Law Ka Thaffuz Urdu
- ″Paigham-e-Amal Urdu
- ″Radde Bidat-o-Monkirat(Imam Raza) Urdu
- ″Sawad-e-Azam Urdu
- ″Sharihe Bukhari Urdu
- ″Taarufe Al Jamtul Ashrafia

== Death ==
Misbahi died on 7 May 2023, at the age of 69.

== See also ==
- Ahmed Raza Khan Barelvi
- Arshadul Qaudri
- Ahmed Yaar Khan
- Syed Kifayat Ali Kafi
- Ahmad Saeed Kazmi
- Hamid Raza Khan
- Obaidullah Khan Azmi
