= Shahroj, Mau =

Shahroj
- Village
- Location in Uttar Pradesh, India Shahroj (India)
- Coordinates: 25.993908°N 83.548962°E
- Country: India
- State: Uttar Pradesh
- District: Mau
- Tehsil: Maunath Bhanjan

Government
  - Type: Panchayati raj (India)
  - Body: Gram panchayat

Languages
  - Official: Hindi
  - Other spoken: Bhojpuri
- Time zone: UTC+5:30 (IST)
- Pin code: 275305
- Telephone code: 05462
- Vehicle registration: UP-54
- Website: up.gov.in

Shahroj is a village located in Maunath Bhanjan tehsil of Mau district, Uttar Pradesh. It has total 969 families residing. Shahroj has population of 6,981 as per government records.

== Administration ==
Shahroj village is administrated by Pradhan through village panchayat, who is the elected representative of the village as per the constitution of India and Panchyati Raj Act. This village comes under the Kopaganj development block. .

Particulars	Total	Male	Female
Total No. of Houses	969		
Population	6981	3671	3310
