= Sanaura =

Village in India

Sanaura is a village in Uttar Pradesh. Tehsil of Sanaura is Muhammadabad-Gohna. District is Mau. Nearby villages are Itaura Chaubepur, Devlas, Bhadid, and many more. The nearest market places are Devlas and Itaura Chaubepur, which are 2.5 km and 2 km away from the village respectively. All the population living in this village are migrants from the nearby village Bhadid. The nearest hospital is located in about 500m.
