= Zalzala =

Zalzala may refer to:

- Az-Zalzala, the 99th sura of the Qur'an
- Zalzala (1952 film), an Indian Hindi-language film
- Zalzala (1988 film), a Bollywood film
- Operation Zalzala, a 2008 Pakistan Army military offensive manhunt
- Zalzala Jazeera, a Pakistani island formed in 2013 by an earthquake
- Zalzala (book), a treatise written by Arshadul Qadri
