= Maurbojh =

Maurbojh is a village in the Mau District (21 km (13 mi) from the center of Mau) in the Indian state of Uttar Pradesh.

The primary language in the village is Hindi. There are 2674 people, including 1376 women and 1648 men, living in 451 houses. The major political parties are BJP, SP, and BSP. Mau Jn railway station is situated 19 km (12 mi) from Maurbojh, and both Ghosi and Kopaganj railway stations are located near the village.

== Education ==
The colleges and schools in the village are Town Inter College; Shri Sant Tulasi Das Inter College; Vibhuti Narayan Inter College; Janta Degree College; Shani Devi Ups G S Pidabal; U P S Maurbojh - Krom; Kishan J H S Radhaul; and Sriram J Hs Saray Ganesh.
