= Abd-al-Ghaffar Mauvi =

Indian Deobandi scholar (1866–1923)

Maulana Abd-al-Ghaffar Mauvi

Personal life
- Born: 1866 Mau,Uttar Pradesh
- Died: 1923 (aged 58) Mau,Uttar Pradesh
- Main interest: Hadith
- Education: Khanqah Gangoh
- Occupation: Islamic scholar, Muhaddith

Religious life
- Religion: Islam
- Denomination: Sunni
- Jurisprudence: Hanafi
- Creed: Maturidi
- Movement: Deobandi

Abd-al-Ghaffar Mauvi or Abdul Ghaffar Mauwi (1866–1923) was an Indian Deobandi scholar. He served as a local Islamic teacher in Mau and Ballia districts, Uttar Pradesh. He obtained certificates, in particular, in the field of hadith from the illustrious Maulana Rashid Ahmad Gangohi in 1889. His famous students, among others, were Allama Muhammad Ibrahim Balyawi and Maulana Habib al-Rahman al-A'zami. Maulana Abd al-Ghaffar Mauvi wrote approximately forty books including a few of them published.
