= Azad Maidan riots =

2012 riots in Mumbai, India

Azad Maidan riot
- Part of 2012 Assam violence
- Location: 18.9395308°N 72.8267933°E; Mumbai, India
- Date: 11 August 2012
- Deaths: 2
- Injuries: 54 (includes 45 policemen)
- Perpetrator: Protestors at Azad Maidan
- Motive: Photographs and pamphlets circulated during protest against 2012 Assam violence and 2012 Rakhine State riots

Azad Maidan Riot refer to riots organised in Azad Maidan in Mumbai, India on 11 August 2012 to condemn the Rakhine riots and which started as a protest and later turned into a riot. The riot reportedly began as the crowd got angry either after hearing an inflammatory speech or after seeing photographs of Rakhine state riots. The riot resulted in two deaths and injuries to 63 people including 58 police officers. Mumbai Police estimated that the riots caused a loss of ₹2.74 crore in damages to public and private property.

== Background ==
The indigenous Bodo community of Assam alleged that the Muslim population was increasing in Assam due to the large influx of illegal immigrants from Bangladesh, while the local Muslim community brushed the allegation aside, saying that they had migrated to Assam during the British Raj. But, with the increasing population, there arose competition for lands, livelihood and power, which led to Assam agitation. The indigenous people of Assam and Bengali Muslims both felt that the Central Government had failed to protect them.

Ethnic tensions between the Bodo people and Bengali Muslims escalated into a riot in Kokrajhar on 20 July 2012, when unidentified miscreants killed four Bodo youths at Joypur. This was followed by retaliatory attacks on local Muslims killing two and injuring several of them on the morning of 21 July 2012. The continued riot killed 77 people and had displaced more than 0.4 million people. Similar rioting took place in Burma between the indigenous Rakhine Buddhists and Rohingya Muslims, where Rohingyas were alleged to be illegal immigrants from Bangladesh.

== Rally at Azad Maidan ==
To condemn the Assam and Rakhine riots, Raza Academy organized a protest rally on 11 August 2012. There were reports from intelligence that there had been provocative messages going around via SMS in Mumbai. A day before the demonstration, police were warned that Friday prayer and gathering had urged a lot of people to turn up for protest. Raza Academy which had organized the protest had earlier assured the Mumbai Police that only 1500 people will turn up. But on the fateful day, around 15000 people assembled at the Azad Maidan and the crowd swelled to over 40000 people.

Police Commissioner Patnaik said the protest turned violent around 3 pm when some members of the crowd began showing "provocative photos" of events in Assam. A section of the mob started attacking OB vans and media crew. Rioters soon started torching vehicles, damaging buses and pelting stones towards policemen. Three OB vans and a police vehicle were set on fire. And the stone pelting resulted in the damage of a BEST bus, two four-wheelers and five two-wheelers. A group of rioters then started marching towards the nearby Chaththrapati Shivaji Maharaj Terminus (CSMT), which was contained successfully by the police nearby.

Police claimed "at least five woman police constables were molested by mob." Also, the injured policemen said the protestors beat them with hockey stick, iron rod, stones, wooden mace with nails, and metal rods.

The riots led to panic in the nearby colleges and hospitals. Cama and Albless Hospital and St Xavier’s College went in lock-down mode to prevent rioters from entering their premises.

== Desecration of Amar Jawan Jyoti ==
Amar Jawan Jyoti memorial, a war memorial dedicated to the fighters of the 1857, the first Indian freedom struggle, was desecrated by the rioters. Abdul Qadir was arrested later by Mumbai police after finding photos of him desecrating the memorial.

== Arrests ==
Within a week of the riots, 43 rioters were arrested in Mumbai. Investigations were then taken over by Mumbai Crime Branch.

Salim Allarakha Choukiya ("Ali"), who had snatched a self-loading rifle from a policeman and is alleged to have fired from it, was arrested on 16 August. Abdul Quadir Mohammed Younus Ansari was arrested on 28 August in Bihar for damaging the Amar Jawan memorial.

On 9 November 2012, Mumbai Police formally charged some 80 people, including Maulana Athar (president of Ulema Board) and Saeed Noori (secretary of Raza Academy), before Esplanade court in south Mumbai. The charges against some of the accused were criminal conspiracy, murder, damaging public properties, unlawful assembly and indulging in violence. Police claim that the riots were pre-planned as rioters appeared with rods and petrol for the rally. The Mumbai police Commissioner was transferred for failing to prevent the riot despite having received prior intelligence inputs.

== Reactions ==
- The President of the Raza Academy, Alhaj Mohammed Saeed Noori, said the "miscreants" involved in the violence were not associated with the academy. "Our protest was peaceful," he said. Noori stated that an "irresponsible" speech had been made during the rally, which the Indian Express claimed, exacerbated tensions.
- On 14 August 2012, Bal Thackeray chief of Shiv Sena and editor of Saamna newspaper published an editorial condemning the Congress-ruled Maharashtra government for "bowing" before "anti-national" rioters. He compared the violence with the 26/11 terrorist attack on Mumbai.

=== Controversial poem ===
A female traffic police Inspector wrote a poem in a local police bulletin of Mumbai. The poem title Azad Maidan was published in Mumbai city police bulletin, Samwad. According to Times of India, she had called Azad Maidan protestors as traitors and snakes and had suggested that they should have been shot. This poem was met with criticism from activists and former city police commissioner alike. Film Director and producer Mahesh Bhatt questioned the source of hatred for minority from police and also asked to put police force in psychiatric couch. In response to the criticisms, the journal Samwad apologised for publishing the poem.
