= Kasara, Mau =

Kasara
- Village
- Location in Uttar Pradesh, India Kasara (India)
- Coordinates: 26.020890°N 83.627437°E
- Country: India
- State: Uttar Pradesh
- District: Mau
- Tehsil: Maunath Bhanjan

Government
  - Type: Panchayati raj (India)
  - Body: Gram panchayat

Languages
  - Official: Hindi
  - Other spoken: Bhojpuri
- Time zone: UTC+5:30 (IST)
- Pin code: 275102
- Telephone code: 05462
- Vehicle registration: UP-54
- Website: up.gov.in

Kasara is a village located in Maunath Bhanjan tehsil of Mau district, Uttar Pradesh. It has total 922 families residing. Kasara has population of 6,047 as per government records.

== Administration ==
Kasara village is administrated by Pradhan who is elected representative of village as per constitution of India and Panchyati Raj Act.

Particulars	Total	Male	Female
Total No. of Houses	922		
Population	6047	3035	3012

== Educational hub ==
This village is educational hub for surrounding villages, having several schools and college there. There is one Jawahar Navodaya Vidyalaya established by the Ministry of Human Resource Development, Government of India. Apart from JNV there are several other colleges in Kasara.

- Jawahar Navodaya Vidyalaya
- Shubham Computers And Janseva Kendra (Public Service For AEPS And Form Filling Center For Various Types)
- Indian Public School
- Dawn Washco School
- Permanand Inter College
- ANS Enterprises (Poultry Enterprise)
- ALIAAR FOODS(Feed Manufacturing Unit)
- Mahavir inter college
- Kalpnath rai institute of medical science
- 400 kv
