= Azmi =

Azmi may refer to:

== Given name ==
=== Arab people ===
- Azmi Bishara (born 1956), Arab politician
- Azmi Mikati (born 1972), Lebanese businessman
- Azmi Nassar (1957–2007), Israeli football manager
- Jabir Al-Azmi, Kuwaiti politician
- Khalil Azmi (born 1964), Moroccan footballer
- Marzouq Al-Hubaini Al-Azmi, Kuwaiti politician
- Mikhled Al-Azmi, Kuwaiti politician
- Najib Azmi Mikati (born 1955), Lebanese politician
- Saad Madhi Saad Howash Al Azmi (born 1979), Kuwaiti citizen
- Zakaria Azmi (born 1938), Egyptian politician

=== Malay people ===
- Amirul Adli Azmi (born 1996), Singaporean football player
- Azi Shahril Azmi (born 1985), Malaysian football player
- Azmi Khalid (born 1940), Malaysian politician
- Azmi Mahmud (born 1967), Malaysian player
- Azmi Mohamed (born 1966), Malaysian football manager
- Azmizi Azmi (born 1986), Malaysian football player
- Hafiq Azmi (born 1996), Malaysian racer
- Mohd Afiq Azmi (born 1989), Malaysian football player
- Azmi Mohamed, President of Malaysian Court
- Mohd Azmi Muslim (born 1986), Malaysian football player
- Zaki Azmi (born 1945), Malaysian judge
- Zubir Azmi (born 1991), Malaysian footballer

=== Other people ===
- Aishah Azmi, British citizen, claimant in Azmi v Kirklees Metropolitan BC
- Azmi Turgut (born 1988), Turkish basketball player
- Cemal Azmi (1868–1922), Turkish politician

== Surname ==
The surname is often adopted by people from the city of Azamgarh, Uttar Pradesh, India.

- Abdul Haq Azmi (1928–2016), Indian Islamic scholar, cousin-uncle of Rana Ayyub
- Abdul Lateef Azmi (1917–2002), Indian Urdu writer
- Abu Asim Azmi (born 1955), Indian politician
- Ahmad Ali Barqi Azmi (born 1954), Indian radio announcer
- Ayesha Takia Azmi (born 1986), Indian actress
- Azizullah Azmi (1929–2010), Indian politician
- Baba Azmi, Indian cinematographer
- Mohammed Badi Uzzaman Azmi (1939–2011), Pakistani actor
- Habib al-Rahman al-'Azmi (1901–1992), Indian Islamic scholar of hadith and fiqh
- Nematullah Azami, President Islamic Fiqh Academy, India
- Iliyas Azmi (born 1934), Indian politician
- Kaifi Azmi (1919–2002), Indian Urdu poet
- Khaleel-Ur-Rehman Azmi (1927–1978), Indian Urdu poet
- Mushtaq Ahmed Azmi (1919–2011), Indian UNESCO official
- Muhammad Mustafa Azmi (1930–2017), Indian Islamic scholar of hadith
- Obaidullah Khan Azmi (born 1949), Indian politician from Madhya Pradesh
- Qamaruzzaman Azmi (born 1946), Indian Islamic scholar
- Saeed-ur-Rahman Azmi Nadvi (born 1934), Indian Islamic scholar
- Seema Azmi, Indian actress
- Shabana Azmi (born 1950), Indian film actress
- Shahid Azmi (1977–2010), Indian solicitor
- Shaikh Shamim Ahmed Azmi (1938–2019), Indian politician from Maharashtra
- Shakeel Azmi (born 1971), Indian poet
- Tanvi Azmi, Indian actress
- Waqar Azmi, British diversity adviser
