= Muhammad Saeed Noori =

Sunni Scholar and activist from India

Personal life
- Main interest: Sufism
- Notable work: Published hundreds of Islamic Books
- Known for: Raza Academy

Religious life
- Religion: Islam
- Denomination: Sunni
- Founder of: Raza Academy
- Jurisprudence: Hanafi
- Tariqa: Qadri
- Creed: Maturidi
- Movement: Barelvi

Muslim leader
- Influenced by: Imam Ahmed Raza Khan Barelvi and Mustafa Raza Khan Qadri
- Influenced: Indian Muslims of Barelvi ideology

Muhammad Saeed Noori is an Indian Sunni leader, activist, founder and president of the Raza Academy, based in Mumbai. The Raza Academy has published books, treatises and journal articles. He has also done relief and charitable activities during Gujarat Riots, Bareilly riots, Kashmir flood, Nepal earthquake and in Kerala 2018 Flood. He has organised rallies and protests on various issues (usually religious issues) around the country through Raza Academy.

== Career ==
On the order of Sunni Barelvi leader Mustafa Raza Khan Qadri, Noori established Raza Academy with the help of other Muslims to carry forward the mission of Ahmed Raza Khan Barelvi. The Academy is considered to be a prominent voice of Indian Muslims.

== Raza Academy ==
Raza Academy is an organization of Indian Sufi Muslims that promotes Islamic beliefs through publications and research. The organization publishes Sunni literature concerned with the thought-school of Ahmed Raza Khan Barelvi. The organization is located in Mumbai, and Muhammad Saeed Noori is its founding secretary. It also works as advocacy group for Indian Muslims and has organised protests on several issues at all India level. An important meeting of Raza Academy was held at Sunni Bilal Masjid, Chhota Sonapur on Thursday regarding the (Eid Milad-un-Nabi) procession. In which Moinuddin Ashraf, President of All India Sunni Jamiat Ulema and President of Raza Academy Alhaj Muhammad Saeed Noori also participated.

== History ==
The Raza Academy was formed in 1978 by Alhaj Mohammed Saeed Noori. Noori has been the President of Raza Academy from 1986. The Academy was established to publish books of Sunni scholars specially of Imam-e-Ahmed Raza Khan Qadri and others. The Academy has published several hundred books of various Islamic subjects written by scholars in Urdu, Arabic, Hindi and In English. According to a report, "It maintains a web portal from as early as 1998 that includes directories of associated institutions and ulema."

== Relief work ==
He has done relief work in number of states.

He distributed relief worth rupees 150 lacs during a riot in Bhiwandi in 1984.

== See also ==
- Ahmed Raza Khan Barelvi
- Arshadul Qaudri
- Ahmad Saeed Kazmi
- Hamid Raza Khan
- Obaidullah Khan Azmi
