= Salim Ansari =

Indian politician

Mohammad Salim Ansari Former Member of Parliament
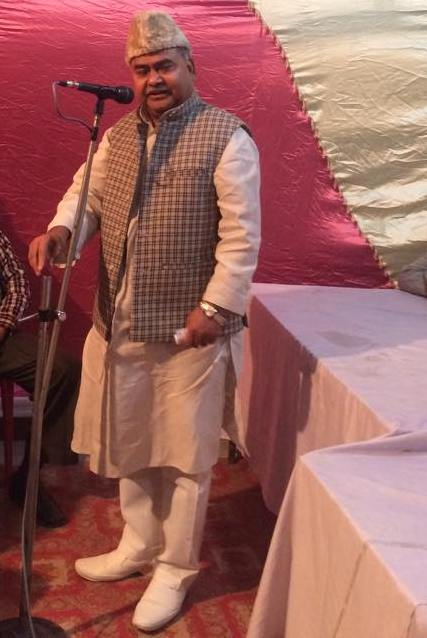

MP of Rajya Sabha for Uttar Pradesh
- In office 5 July 2010 – 4 July 2016

Personal details
- Born: 12 April 1962 (age 64) Mau, Uttar Pradesh, India
- Party: Bahujan Samaj Party (BSP)
- Spouse: Shagufta Parveen
- Children: 5
- Education: Gorakhpur University
- Occupation: Social activist, Politician
- Profession: Politician

Mohammad Salim Ansari (born 12 April 1962) is an ex-senior BSP leader and former member of parliament in Rajya Sabha. He did his schooling from his hometown in state board school and graduation (B.A) and post-graduation (M.A 3rd Division) from D.C.S.K.P.G. College, Mau. He is now Former BSP member Salim Ansari was expelled from the party two times.

Salim Ansari was also General Secretary, Student Union, D.C.S.K.P.G. College, Mau (Uttar Pradesh), 1985; Manager, Muslim Inter College, Mau since 1992; Member, (i) General Body, Jamia Islamia Faiz-e-Aam and (ii) Jamia Asaria Darul-Hadees & Manager of Muslim Inter College, Mau (Minority Institution). He is also a former member of Haj Committee of India, Standing Committee of Information Technology, Consultative Committee of the Ministry of Minority Affairs, Corporate Affairs and for the Ministry of Railways.
