= 2012 Assam violence =

Ethnic violence in Assam, India

2012 Assam communal violence.
- The violence took place in the districts of Kokrajhar (top left, coloured red), Dhubri (bottom left, coloured red) and Chirang (formed out of parts of Bongaigaon (top right, coloured pink)).
- Location: Bodoland, India
- Date: 20 July 2012 – 15 September 2012
- Attack type: Ethnic-communal Mass violence and attack on each other between Bodos and Bengali Muslims.
- Deaths: 108

In July 2012, violence in the Indian state of Assam broke out with riots between indigenous Bodos and Bengali Muslims (locally called or known by the name Miyas) in the Bodoland region of North East, India.

The first incident was reported to have taken place on 20 July 2012. At least 108 people died and over 400,000 people were displaced into 270 relief camps, after being displaced from almost 400 villages. Eleven people have been reported missing.

On 27 July 2012, Assam's Chief Minister Tarun Gogoi blamed the UPA led national government for a "delay in army deployment to riot-hit areas". The next day, Indian Prime Minister Manmohan Singh visited the relief camps in Kokrajhar and called the recent violence a blot on the face of India. Indian Home Minister P. Chidambaram visited the state on Monday, 30 July to review the security situation and the relief and rehabilitation measures being taken.

Lok Sabha member from Kokrajhar, Sansuma Khunggur Bwiswmuthiary blamed illegal immigration for the violence in the state. The Election Commissioner of India, H.S. Brahma, said that of the 27 districts in Assam, 11 of them will be shown to have a Muslim majority when the 2011 census figures are published. Singh was criticised for not dealing with the flood of illegal immigrants from Bangladesh.

The violence and exodus of thousands of people from Northeast India reportedly led to a series of incessant protests in Assam, at multiple locations, during the months of August–September. The protesters' main demand was expeditious detection and deportation of illegal infiltrators from Assam. On 15 September, at a convention of non-political indigenous ethnic groups, organisations representing the Bodo, Dimasa, Tiwa, Deuri, Karbi, Garo, Rabha, Sonowal Kacharis tribes and other indigenous communities decided to form a coordination committee for the cause. The tribal leaders said illegal immigration has threatened the existence, right to land and resources of all indigenous people of the entire state, and it was not limited to BTAD alone.

== Background ==
The violence in 2012 followed ethnic tensions between the indigenous Bodo people and Bengali-speaking Muslims. While the Bengali-speaking Muslims state that they are descendants of East Bengali Muslims brought to Assam during the British Raj, local indigenous communities allege the Muslim population has increased, boosted by refugees from the erstwhile East Pakistan before the Indo-Pakistani War of 1971 and by subsequent illegal migrants from Bangladesh.

By the mid-1970s, increased competition for livelihood, land and political power led to frequent incidents of violence, including the Nellie massacre after the controversial 1983 state elections, which left nearly 3,000 dead, and other large scale clashes. These incidents resulted in resentment directed at India's central government, not only from Bodos, Rabhas, Tiwas, Keot (Kaibarta) and other indigenous ethnic groups for failing to prevent illegal migration, but also from the indigenous Assamese Muslim community for failing to protect the rights of minorities.

In 1998, Srinivas Kumar Sinha, who was the governor of Assam at the time, had sent a report to then Indian President, KR Narayanan, explaining the problems the unchecked illegal immigration of Bangladeshis would bring to the integrity of India. In this report, he had highlighted the history of Assam first being claimed by Pakistan during 1947 and then by Bangladesh, due to its rich natural resources. The report raised worries about what might happen if illegal immigrants gain a majority and ask for secession from India. He also cited the "Greater Bangladesh project" which might entice the immigrants to merge those regions of Assam with Bangladesh.

The rapid growth of international Islamic fundamentalism may provide the driving force for this demand. The loss of Lower Assam will severe the entire North-East from the rest of India and the rich natural resources of this region will be lost to the nation.

— Srinivas Kumar Sinha.

== Riots in Kokrajhar, Chirang ==
Ethnic tensions between Bodos and Bengali-speaking Muslims escalated into a riot in Kokrajhar on 20 July 2012, when muslims killed four Bodo youth at Joypur. This was followed by retaliatory attacks on local Muslims killing two and injuring several of them on the morning of 21 July 2012. Almost 80 people were killed, most of whom were Bengali Muslims and some Bodos. 400,000 people were displaced to migrant camps, most being Muslims. The Indian Army was deployed amid curfews to stem the mob rioting, with permission to shoot on sight. Around 500 villages had been destroyed through arson.

== Central government response ==
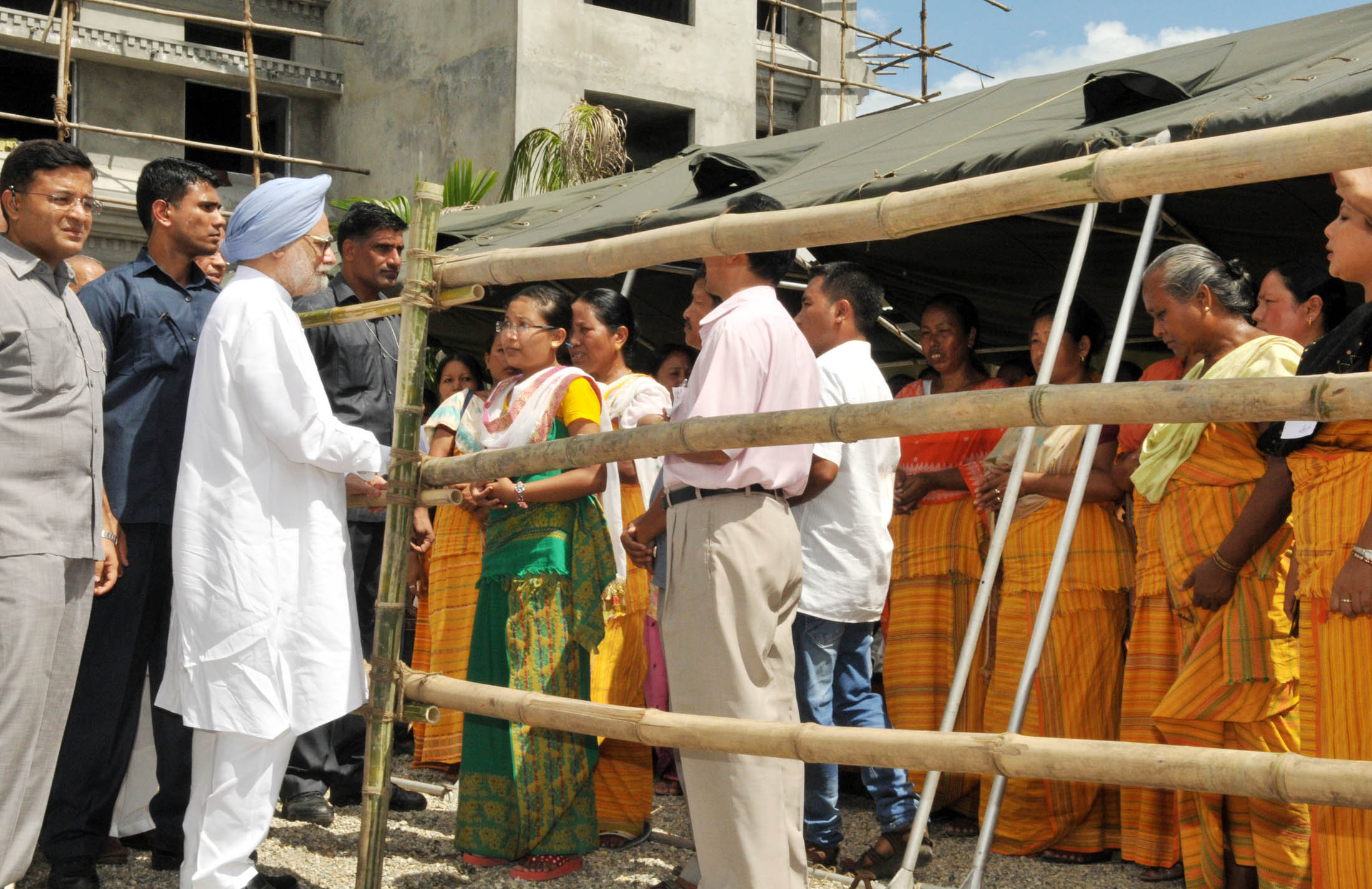
The Prime Minister Manmohan Singh at a relief camp, July 28, 2012

On the request of Sansuma Khunggur Bwiswmuthiary, the MP from Kokrajhar, the Indian prime minister Manmohan Singh called the Chief Minister of Assam, Tarun Gogoi, on 23 July 2012 and instructed him to do whatever was necessary to restore peace. The violence continued despite the efforts of the state law enforcement agencies, and on 24 July 2012, India's central government deployed paramilitary forces and 13 columns of the Indian Army to the affected districts. On the same day, shoot-on-sight orders and an indefinite curfew were enforced across Kokrajhar district, which also led to the death of four people when police fired at violent crowds in the Rampur and Chaprakata areas of Kokrajhar. The Army conducted flag marches and the disrupted rail services were resumed on 25 July 2012, under the protection of the central forces. Union Home Secretary R.K. Singh stated that there were signs of improvement and called upon the Assam government to immediately act against the "ring leaders" of both factions.

On 26 July, an indefinite curfew and the shoot-on-sight orders were enforced in Kokrajhar district, along with a night curfew in Chirang and Dhubri districts. On 26 July, the state's chief minister, Tarun Gogoi, announced the payment of ₹ 600,000 as compensation to the next of kin of the dead. Gogoi also announced that the people who were rendered homeless or displaced would be provided new houses at government expense. The chief minister assured the population that peace would soon return to the violence-affected areas. Singh visited the district of Kokrajhar to observe the situation on 28 July 2012 and offered support to the victims. The prime minister said that the Centre will "closely work with the state government to provide a sense of security to all affected areas to ensure that they can go back to their houses secure in the knowledge that their lives and livelihood are secure". Singh said ₹ 200,000 would be given to the next of kin of those who died and ₹ 50,000 to the injured. He announced ₹ 1 billion for relief and rehabilitation of the affected people in the six affected districts, ₹ 1 billion as Special Plan assistance for development programs in the affected areas and another ₹ 1 billion under the Indira Awaas Yojana. ₹ 30,000 each would be given to those whose houses were totally destroyed, ₹ 20,000 under the Prime Minister's National Relief Fund to those whose houses were partially damaged.

The Prime Minister ordered an inquiry committee to be set up to look into the violence, and directed the state government to provide security so that the affected people can return home. On 28 July, Gogoi said that the late arrival of central forces, including the Army, assisted the spread of clashes in the state. According to the media reports, the Army was initially reluctant to deploy the troops and wanted clarification from the Defence Ministry on deployment because the situation "seemed to have communal overtones". When the situation deteriorated rapidly and another request was made, the ministry authorised Army deployment on 25 July 2012.

The Centre authorized the Assam government to deploy more than 11,000 paramilitary personnel in the state's violence-hit districts and has dispatched a relief plane with medical teams and supplies. Central paramilitary forces are now out in full force in Assam; the deployment of 65 paramilitary companies has been ordered and 53 companies have reached Assam. Of these, five were sent on the night of 20 July. 7,300 paramilitary personnel were deployed in strife-torn Kokrajhar, Chirang and Dhubri districts after moving them from other states in the wake of clashes between Bodos and Bengali-speaking Muslims.

AIUDF leader Badruddin Ajmal claimed that the state administration was complicit in the violence and demanded a CBI inquiry into the riots. Assam Chief Minister Tarun Gogoi, recommended a CBI probe into the clashes in BTAD and Dubri districts and claimed "internal and external forces were at work". On 7 August 2012, the Centre ordered a CBI probe into the continued ethnic clashes in the state.

According to the Times of India, some 14 Muslim groups which came into existence in the last 20 years are under observation by intelligence agencies after inputs suggested that their activities were "inimical to peace and social harmony". The organizations named are Muslim Security Council of Assam, United Liberation Militia of Assam, Islamic Liberation Army of Assam, Muslim Volunteer Force, Muslim Liberation Army, Muslim Security Force, Islamic Sevak Sangh and Islamic United Reformation Protest of India.

=== Criticism of the response ===
The Ministry of Home Affairs (MHA) and some senior Indian officials are said to have questioned whether the deployment of the Indian Army to curb the outbreak of violence was enacted fast enough.

== CBI investigation ==
On 7 August 2012, the Govt of India ordered a CBI probe of the matter. CBI on 19 September 2012, carried out first arrests by arresting five youth in connection with the alleged lynching of four Bodo youth in the Kokrajhar area on 20 July. Mohammed Hashem Ali, Mohammed Adom Ali Sheikh, Mohammed Hashim Ali Rehman, Mohammed Qurban Ali Sheikh, and Mohammed Imran Hussain were arrested after they allegedly confessed their involvement. Further investigation led to the arrest of the real culprit behind the 2012 ethnic clash, who has been identified as an Assam Police Constable Mohibur Islam alias Ratul who is currently absconding.

== Repercussions in other parts of India ==
=== Maharashtra ===
==== Pune ====
On 8 and 9 August, some Meiteis were attacked in Pune. Students and professionals were beaten up by Muslims allegedly in Pune's Kondhwa and Poona College areas. Attackers asked victims which state they belonged to, and those who replied Manipur were beaten. One of the victims said some attackers wore college uniform while others were in casual clothes. Police arrested nine Muslims as the alleged perpetrators of the attacks.

==== Mumbai ====
On 11 August 2012, a Muslim protest against the riots in Assam and attacks on Rohingya Muslims in Myanmar was held at Azad Maidan in Mumbai. The protest was organised by Raza Academy, and was attended by two other groups, Sunni Jamiatul Ulema and Jama'at-e-Raza-e-Mustafa. It ended in violence; two were killed and 54 others injured, including 45 policemen. Police Commissioner Arup Patnaik said it was around 3 pm when the crowd turned violent, after some protesters displayed "provocative photos" of the Assam violence. "Some people started raising slogans against the police and media. They set fire to police vehicles," said Patnaik. "As we tried restraining the crowd, a scuffle broke out between the protestors and police."

The Mumbai Police Crime Branch suspects that the riot outside Azad Maidan was part of a "big conspiracy". Crime Branch sources said the police are probing the alleged role of "outside agencies". Crime Branch officers said the police felt the violence may have been pre-planned as the protestors were equipped with gear to torch vehicles, which they used to set fire to three media outdoor broadcasting (OB) vans and four police vans, one of which belonged to the riot control police. They also damaged several other vehicles, including BEST buses. At least 30 vehicles were damaged in the incident. The police had to resort to a lathi charge to disperse the crowd. Two of the OB vans belonged to ABP News and P7 News. Eight of the 45 policemen hurt sustained serious head injuries. The police claimed "at least five woman police constables were molested by the mob." There were also reports of a few rioters having stolen police weapons and fired in the air and at the police, but no casualties were reported. Some photographers were also reportedly injured during the violence. The police later claimed provocative pamphlets were distributed during the protest, and they were investigating their source. The Amar Jawan Jyoti memorial for martyred soldiers in South Mumbai was desecrated during the riot.

The President of the Raza Academy, Alhaj Mohammed Saeed Noori, said the "miscreants" involved in the violence were not associated with the academy. "Our protest was peaceful," he said. Noori stated that an "irresponsible" speech had been made during the rally, which the Indian Express claimed exacerbated tensions. Noori said: "There were several people on the stage. One irresponsible person made statements regarding the media coverage. He was immediately stopped and attempts were made to calm the situation. We had no idea that this will happen," he said, condemning the attack on the media.

Riots at Azad Maidan led to panic in the nearby colleges and hospitals. Cama and Albless Hospital and St Xavier's College were locked down to prevent rioters from entering their premises.

While condemning the violence caused by rioters, All India Secular Forum social activist Irfan Engineer blamed Raza Academy for being parochial in nature. Engineer said: "The riots have ruptured the lives of every person in Assam. It has nothing to do with Muslims, Hindus, Bodos or anybody. Raza Academy, while organising the rally, should have taken all measures to see that the crowd does not go out of control or infiltrators take advantage of it or that protest rally just does not become confined for one community and thereby score an advantage in the community itself."

23 people were arrested on charges of murder and have been remanded to police custody. Raza Academy and Madinatul Ilm Foundation were booked under section 302 (murder) of IPC. Police suspected Facebook and social media were used to mobilise the mob. Rioters were found carrying sticks, rods and petrol cans to the rally, so police suspected the riot was pre-meditated and investigated the source of the weapons. Police found CCTV footage showing protesters pouring petrol on vehicles before setting them alight.

On 14 August 2012, Bal Thackeray, the chief of Shiv Sena and editor of Saamna newspaper published an editorial condemning the Congress-ruled Maharashtra government for "bowing" before "anti-national" Muslims who went on the rampage in south Mumbai. He compared the violence with the 26/11 terrorist attack on Mumbai.

While 26/11 happened all of a sudden, Saturday's violence happened right under the nose of the city police. Those who held south Mumbai to ransom are not just miscreants, they are anti-national Muslims. However, it is unfortunate that the police did nothing to control the crisis. The office of the police commissioner is barely 100 steps away from the place where the Muslim youths went on the rampage. They took away weapons from policemen, molested women, assaulted innocent citizens and torched public vehicles. Yet the police did nothing. Their bullets turned into chocolates."

A special team of 12 officers from the Crime Branch headed by an assistant commissioner of police will conduct the investigations. Two police rifles stolen by the mob were recovered in Amrutnagar, Mumbra, in neighbouring Thane district. Only 19 rounds out of 160 rounds stolen were recovered.

=== Andhra Pradesh ===
Two labourers, Sudip Barman, 23, and Khanin Ray, 32 from North-East were attacked in Andhra Pradesh while traveling on the Ernakulam Express. One of the men sustained severe injuries and later died.

=== Uttar Pradesh ===
On 17 August 2012, Muslim mobs resorted to large scale violence against mediapersons, bystanders, shops, vehicles and tourists in several cities including Lucknow, Kanpur and Allahabad. In Lucknow, after the Friday Namaz, a mob of 500 ravaged various landmarks of the city including Buddha Park, Haathi Park, Shaheed Smarak and Parivartan Chowk, and vandalized many statues including those of Gautam Buddha and Mahavira.

=== Attacks on people from Northeast and exodus ===
In August 2012, 30,000 people from the Northeast region had fled Bangalore after attacks and threats of more attacks to come after Ramadan. Shiyeto from Nagaland, a resident of Bangalore, was attacked by a group of people who threatened to kill him if he did not leave the city before Ramadan. Another person from Assam was alleged to be attacked.

Pune, Chennai and Hyderabad also witnessed an exodus of people from the Northeast. In the national capital Delhi, rumours that people from the Northeast will be targeted, particularly after Ramadan, started circulating.

Union Home Ministry banned bulk SMS and MMS for 15 days to quell rumours and threats. Railways introduced two special trains to meet the rush of people fleeing.

Singh called for maintaining peace at "any cost". Then Bharatiya Janata Party president Nitin Gadkari blamed illegal migrants for the attacks on people from Northeast. Gadkari said the violent mob in Mumbai had waved a Pakistani flag, made provocative remarks and vandalised the martyrs' memorial. He also condemned the attack on the media present and the assault on women police by the demonstrators at Azad Maidan.

DGP Dinesh Reddy of Andhra Pradesh State, said, "Police have been deployed at all localities with a sizeable North-East population, to boost the community's confidence. Besides, round-the-clock police patrols have been organised."

A policeman at Chennai Egmore station, where Howrah-bound trains from the South make a brief halt, remarked about the exodus: "The large crowds remind me of the arrival of Tamil refugees from Sri Lanka decades ago."

On 18 August 2012, Bangalore police arrested three persons for sending SMSs and MMSs, to incite hatred against people from the Northeast. Anees Pasha, Thaseem Nawaz and Shahid Salman Khan were arrested, and four mobiles, two computers and one laptop were seized from them. The culprits are believed to have shown clippings of violence in Assam and told a group of Northeast youth that they would face a similar fate if they continued to stay in Bangalore beyond 20 August.

In Coimbatore, police arrested a person identified as B Mohammed Sheik Hassain for sending more than 200 hate SMSs. According to Hassain, a person named Anvar first sent him the message. Hassain has been charged under the IPC for threat to national integration and creating public mischief, and under the Copyright Act.

Investigators traced the source of hate messages to Islamist groups such as Popular Front of India, Harkat-ul-Jihad al-Islami, Manita Neeti Pasarai and Karnataka Forum for Dignity. The SMS campaign was designed to create panic among people from the Northeast forcing them to flee and to damage the social fabric and economy. The Kerala State Intelligence was asked to check the veracity of the report with respect to the PFI.

=== Bangalore ===
Messages were circulated warning people of Northeastern states of India to leave Bangalore and other cities before Eid al-Fitr (the festival that marks the end of Ramadan) which was on 20 August 2012.

== See also ==
- Illegal Migrants (Determination by Tribunal) Act, 1983
