= Raza Academy =

Indian Muslim organisation

- Formation: 1978
- Type: Nonprofit
- Legal status: Active
- Headquarters: Raza Academy 52 - Dontad Street, Khadak, Mumbai - 400009
- President: Muhammad Saeed Noori
- Key people: Muhammad Saeed Noori
- Website: www.razaacademy.com

Raza Academy is a Sunni Muslim Islamist group based in Maharashtra, India. It was formed in 1978 by Muhammad Saeed Noori as a small publishing house, and later became known for protests for the rights of Muslims. The group publishes books of Barelvi scholars in various languages, the Kanzul Iman translation of the Quran, and Fatawa-i Razawiyya. The group also conducts charity and advocacy work for the Muslim community.

== Early history and publishing ==
Raza Academy was founded in 1978 by Muhammad Saeed Noori, who has served as the organization's president since 1986. According to a report, "It maintains a web portal from as early as 1998 that includes directories of associated institutions and ulema." The Academy has published several hundred books of Ahle Sunnah scholars in various languages. Kanzul Iman, a translation of the Quran, is being published by it in Urdu and in English. It has also published Fatawa-e-Razvia in 25 volumes. The books on life and works of Ahmed Raza Khan Barelvi and biographies of other Sunni Sufi scholars were also published by the Academy.

== Relief and charity work ==
In 2012, Raza Academy and All India Sunni Jamiat ul Ulema formed the Sunni Relief Committee to help distribute relief materials collected from various parts of West Bengal and Maharashtra among the riot victims in Assam. The organisation distributed relief material during 2018 Kerala floods and facilitated the burial of Muslim COVID-19 victims in Mumbai.

== Violence and protests ==
In 2006, in the Bhiwandi suburb of Mumbai, two policemen were killed after protests organised by Raza Academy. On 11 August 2012, Raza Academy held a protest against the riots in Assam and attacks on Muslims in Myanmar at Azad Maidan in Mumbai with two other groups. The protest ended in the Azad Maidan riots, in which two people were killed and more than fifty injured. Raza Academy was blamed for the widespread violence and a court asked them to pay ₹3 crore (30 million rupees) in property damage. In November 2021, the group organised a protest of the violence in Tripura which also turned violent and was brought under control after the imposition of a curfew.

The organisation has protested the women's rights programs of Taslima Nasrin and Muhammad Tahir-ul-Qadri. It deemed the enactment of The Muslim Women (Protection of Rights on Marriage) Act, 2019 – which declared triple talaq (instant divorce) as a criminal offense – to infringe upon the religious rights of Muslims in India.

In 2015, Raza Academy issued a fatwa against music composer A. R. Rahman and Iranian filmmaker Majid Majidi for making a film on Muhammad. In 2018, it called for the ban on the public dissemination of the viral song "Manikya Malaraya Poovi" from Oru Adaar Love, which allegedly insulted Mohammed and his wife. In February's 2021, it lodged a complaint against the BBC for publishing picture of Muhammad. The BBC revised the video and removed the contents that hurt the religious sentiments of Muslims.

In 2016, Raza Academy held protests calling for the ban of Indian Muslim preacher Zakir Naik following allegations that the perpetrators of the 2016 Gulshan attack were inspired by Naik.

Raza Academy held solidarity marches and demonstrations against Pakistan after the 2019 Pulwama attack and 2019 Balakot airstrike. On 29 October 2020, Raza Academy stamped posters of French president Emmanuel Macron on Mumbai roads in reaction to Macron's remarks on Muslims.

Raza Academy handed a memo to the Superintendent of Ajmer Police Station demanding Ban on Ajmer 92 films and stated that it harms the trust and faith of Muslims on Khwaja Moinuddin Chishti. They stated if it is not banned they'll launch a great protest.

On 3 July 2023, Raza Academy protested against Sweden. Raza Academy demanded death penalty for the person who burnt Quran. Academy President Muhammad Saeed Noori was leading this Protest.

On 12 November 2021, Raza Academy called statewide protests in Maharashtra against the alleged burning of a Mosque in Tripura. The protests turned violent in Malegaon, Amravati and Nanded. The protestors damaged public properties and stone pelted the Police.

== See also ==
- Islam in India
- Islamism in South Asia
- Muhammad Saeed Noori
