= Fiza Ibn-e-Faizi =

- فضا ابن فیضی
- Born: 1 July 1923; Mau, India
- Died: 17 January 2009 (aged 86); Mau, India
- Education: Faiz-e-Aam
- Occupations: Poet, writer
- Writing career
- Genre: Ghazal
- Subjects: Love, Philosophy, Monotheism
- Notable work: Kulliyat Fiza Ibn-e-Faizi

Faizul Hasan Ibn-e-Faizi (Urdu/Persian: فیض الحسن فضا ابن فیضی; 1 July 1923 – 17 January 2009), also known by the pen name of Fiza (Urdu: فضا; Hindi: फिजा), was a modern Urdu and Persian poet. He was a native of Mau district of Uttar Pradesh and is considered a 'qadir-ul-kalaam' poet and had received numerous awards within the Urdu world. At least, six poetry collections of Faizi had been published and acclaimed.

== Personal life ==
=== Background ===
Fiza Ibn-e-Faizi was born in Doman Pura, Mau and studied in Jamia Islamiya Faiz-e-Aam, Mau and graduated in Urdu literature and Islamic jurisprudence. Having been born into a poor weaving family, he was unable to further his education. He had avocations of weaving and saying poetry. For few years, he taught in his alma mater. In 2008, the municipal head of his native city built a memorial gate, Faizi Gate near his house. In 2009, Faizi died after a prolonged illness.

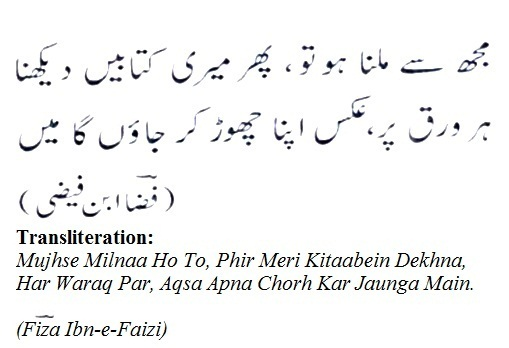
Couplet of Fiza in Nastaliq

== See also ==
- Ahmad Faraz
- Ghalib
- Abul Kalam Azad
