= Laxmi Narayan Mishra =

Basti, Maunath Bhanjan (1903–1987)

- Born: 17 December 1903; Maunath Bhanjan district, United Provinces of Agra and Oudh, India
- Died: 19 August 1987 (aged 83)
- Occupation: Writer
- Writing career
- Language: Hindi

Laxmi Narayan Mishra (17 December 1903 – 19 August 1987) was an Indian Hindi play writer, born in the village of Basti in Maunath Bhanjan district, United Provinces of Agra and Oudh.

He was a theatre personality of Uttar Pradesh. His works became very popular between 1930 and 1950, and they were frequently staged by schools, colleges, and amateur groups.

== Main works ==
- Ashok-1926
- Sanyasi-1930
- Rakshas ka mandir-1931 (Temple of Demons)
- Muktika rahasya-1932 (Secret of Freedom)
- Sindur ki Holi-1933 (Holi with Vermillion)
- Garuda Dhawaj-1945 (Flag with Garida"s Figure)
- Vatsaraj-1950
- Chakravyuh-1953 (Chakra formation)
- Samaj ke Stambha (Pillars of Society)
- Gudiya ka Ghar(A Doll's House)
- Chakravyuha ( Play based on Mahabharata Character Abhimanyu, printed by kaushambhi prakashan, Dara gunj, Allahabad 1973, 25th edition)

== See also ==
- List of Indian writers
- Sahitya Academy
