= Al-Jamiatul Asaria Darul Hadees =

Educational Institution (Madrasa) in Mau

Jamia Asariya Darul Hadees دارالحديث दारुल हदीस मऊ
- Type: Islamic university
- Established: 1954
- Chancellor: Majlis-e-Shoora
- Vice-Chancellor: Haji Multan Ahmed
- Location: Mau, Uttar Pradesh, India
- Website: aljamiatulasaria.co.in

Al-Jamiatul Asaria Darul Hadees, Mau is an Islamic Educational Institution (Madrasa) located in Mau in eastern Uttar Pradesh which was established in 1954. Besides providing traditional Islamic education, Jamia Asaria has also opened contemporary educational institutions such as Darul Hadees Higher Secondary Boys School, Mau. This institute has produced many Muslim scholars of national and international repute also such as Sheikh Dr. Obaidur Rahman, Sheikh Meraj Rabbani, Salim Ansari, etc.

== See also ==
- Darul Uloom Mau
