= Islamism in South Asia =

Islamism in South Asia may refer to:

- Muslim nationalism in South Asia
- Islamist movements in South Asia
- Islamist leadership and organisations in India

Historical events

- Muhammad Zia-ul-Haq's Islamization
- 1984 Pakistani Islamisation programme referendum
- Pakistan Movement
- Talibanization
- International propagation of Salafism and Wahhabism (Taliban in Afghanistan)

== See also ==
- Category:Islamism in India
- Category:Islamism in Pakistan
- Category:Islamism in Bangladesh
- Category:Islamism in Afghanistan
- Category:Indian Islamists
- Category:Pakistani Islamists
- Category:Bangladeshi Islamists
- Category:Islamic terrorism in Pakistan
- Category:Islamic terrorism in Bangladesh
- Category:Islamic terrorism in India
- Category:Jihadist groups in Bangladesh
- Category:Jihadist groups in Afghanistan
- Category:Jihadist groups in India
- Category:Jihadist groups in Pakistan
- Template:Islamism in South Asia
- Template:Militant Islamism in South Asia
- Spread of Islam to the Indian subcontinent
