= World Islamic Mission =

International Sunni Muslim organization

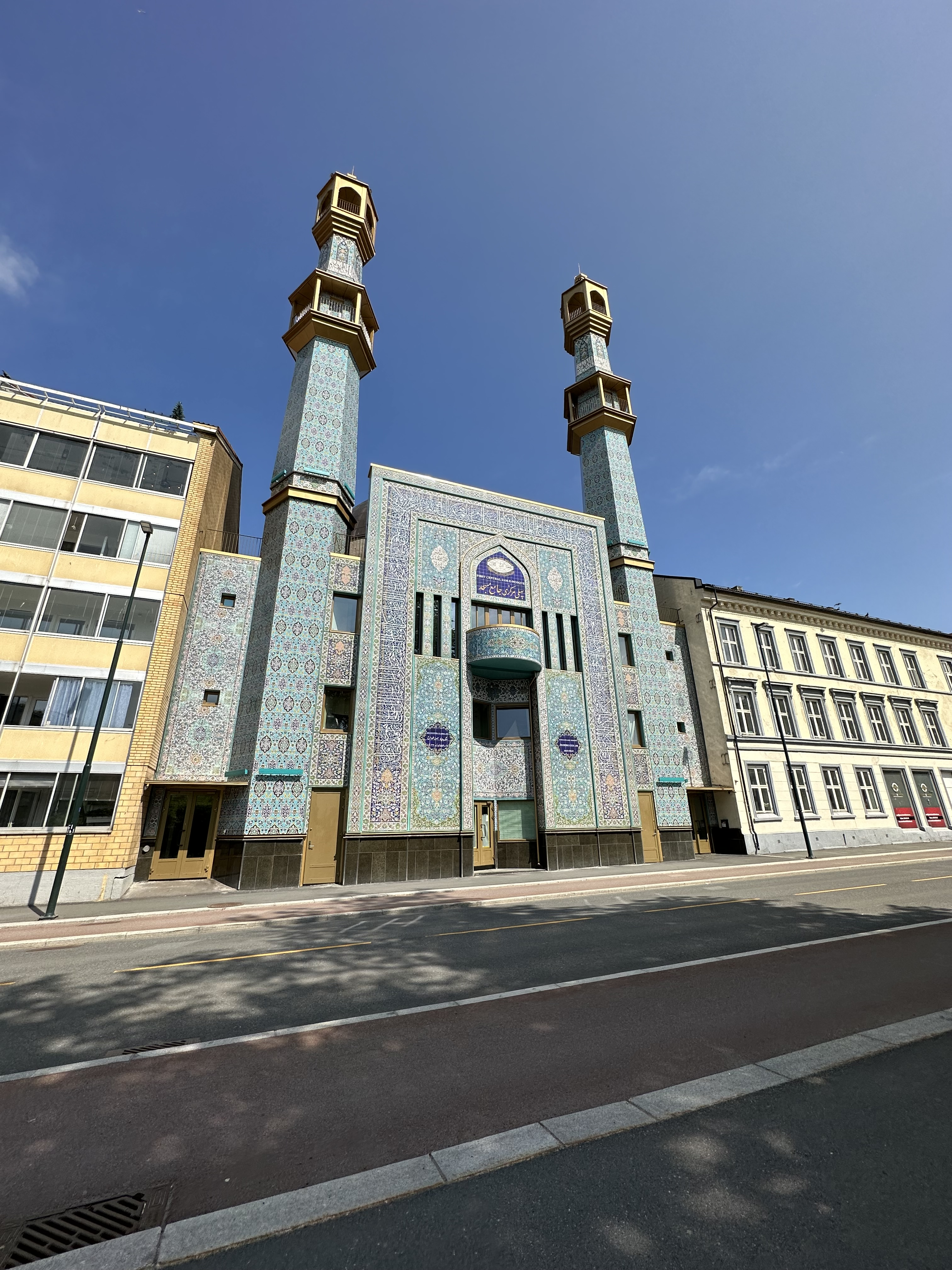
- Abbreviation: WIM
- Formation: 1972
- Founder: Arshadul Qaudri; Ma'roof Hussain Shah Arif Qadri
- Type: Religious organisation, NGO
- Legal status: Active
- Headquarters: Manchester, United Kingdom
- Region served: Global
- Official language: Urdu, Arabic and English, and other languages,
- President (Sadr in Urdu): Qamaruzzaman Azmi

World Islamic Mission (WIM) is an international Muslim organisation of Sufi-inspired Barelvi Sunni Muslims. It was established in the United Kingdom by Shah Ahmad Noorani Siddiqi, Pir Syed Ma'roof Hussain Shah Arif Qadri Naushahi and Arshadul Qaudri in Mecca in 1972. It is active in Europe, the United States of America, North America, Africa, and Asia. The headquarters is in Manchester, UK.

== Leadership ==
The movement is led by Qamaruzzaman Azmi, a Sunni Muslim scholar who was named in 2011 by Georgetown University as one of the "500 Most Influential Muslims in the World".
