= Kalpnath Rai =

Indian politician (1941–1999)

- Born: 4 January 1941; Mau, United Provinces, British India
- Died: 6 August 1999 (aged 58); New Delhi, India

Kalpnath Rai (4 January 1941 – 6 August 1999) was an Indian politician. He served as a member of the Rajya Sabha between 1974–80, 1980–86, and 1986–92, as well as being elected on four term occasions to the Lok Sabha from the Ghosi constituency in the state of Uttar Pradesh. 1989-1991-1996-1998. He was a minister in various national Congress (I) governments.

Rai is credited with giving Mau the status of a district during his tenure as an MP from Ghosi.

== Early life ==
Rai was born in a Bhumihar family and educated at Gorakhpur University in Uttar Pradesh. He had MA degrees in English and Sociology, as well as a LL.B. degree. He practised as an advocate in the Allahabad High Court.

== Political career ==
- 1963-66 General-Secretary, Samajvadi Yuvjan Sabha, Uttar Pradesh
- 1967-69 Executive Member, Samyukta Socialist Party (S.S.P.)
- 1969-70 Chairman, National Central Commission, S.S.P.
- 1974-76 Member, Executive Committee, Congress Parliamentary Party (Indira) [C.P.P.(I)]
- 1974-78 Member, Rajya Sabha
- 1978-79 General-Secretary, C.P.P. (I) Member, All India Congress Committee (Indira) [A.I.C.C.(I)]
- June 1980- Joint-Secretary, A.I.C.C. (I)
- 1980-81 General-Secretary, A.I.C.C. (I)
- 1980 Member, Rajya Sabha (2nd term)
- 1982-83 Union Deputy Minister, Parliamentary Affairs; and Industry
- 1982-84 Union Minister of State, Parliamentary Affairs
- 1986 Member, Rajya Sabha (3rd term)
- 1988-89 Union Minister of State, Power
- 1989 Elected to 9th Lok Sabha
- Jan. 1990- Member, Committee on Subordinate Legislation
- Aug. 1990 1990-91 Member, Committee on Public Undertakings Member, Consultative Committee, Ministry of Energy
- 1991 Re-elected to 10th Lok Sabha (2nd term)
- 1991-92 Union Minister of State, Power and Non- Conventional Energy Sources (Independent Charge)
- 1992-93 Union Minister of State, Power (Independent Charge)
- 1993-94 Union Minister of State, Food (Independent Charge)
- 1996 Re-elected to 11th Lok Sabha (3rd term)
- 1996-97 Member, Committee on Science and Technology, Environment and Forests
- 1998 Re-elected to 12th Lok Sabha (4th term)
- 1998-99 Member, Committee on Commerce and its Sub-Committee on Textiles Member, Consultative Committee, Ministry of Finance

== Death ==
Rai died in Ram Manohar Hospital on 6 August 1999, aged 58, from a heart attack. He was survived by his wife, a son and five daughters.A conspiracy prevailed that he was poisoned but this conspiracy lacked evidence, so theory was rejected.
