= Habibur Rahman Nomani =

Indian politician

Maulana Habibur Rahman Nomani

Member of Legislative Assembly, Uttar Pradesh
- In office 1969–1974

Member of Legislative Council, Uttar Pradesh
- In office 1975–1980

Minister of State/Deputy Minister of Transport, Government of Uttar Pradesh
- In office 1970–1972

Minister of State/Deputy Minister of Transport, Government of Uttar Pradesh
- In office 1976–1977

Member of Rajya Sabha
- In office 27 August 1993 – 26 August 1999

General Secretary, Uttar Pradesh Congress Committee
- In office 1973–1975

Personal details
- Born: 21 August 1926 Maunath Bhanjan
- Died: 17 August 2005 (aged 78) Maunath Bhanjan
- Party: Indian National Congress
- Spouse: Shrimati Sajida Begam
- Children: 10
- Parent: Maulana Abdul Lateef Nomani
- Education: Jamia Miftahul Uloom
- Profession: Politician

Maulana Habibur Rahman Nomani (21 August 1926 - 17 August 2005) was an Indian politician from Uttar Pradesh and belongs to the Indian National Congress.

== Political career ==
He served as a member of the Uttar Pradesh Legislative Assembly from 1969 to 1974, member of the Uttar Pradesh Legislative Council from 1975 to 80, Minister of State and Deputy Minister of Transport in the Government of Uttar Pradesh from 1970 to 1972 and again from 1976 to 1977. He was nominated to the Rajya Sabha in 1993 and served till 1999. Maulana Nomani was General Secretary of the Uttar Pradesh Congress Committee from 1973 to 1975. He died on 17 August 2005 at his hometown.

== Sources ==
- Brief Biodata
