= Azmi Mahmud =

Malaysian footballer

Personal information
- Full name: Mohd Azmi Mahmud
- Date of birth: 6 May 1967 (age 59)
- Place of birth: Parit Buntar, Perak, Malaysia
- Position: Goalkeeper

Youth career
- 1983–1986: Kedah Schools Team

Senior career*
Years	Team	Apps	(Gls)
1986–2003	Kedah FA	130	

International career
1987–1990	Malaysia		
- * Club domestic league appearances and goals as of 11 December 2013

Azmi Mahmud (born 6 May 1967 in Parit Buntar, Perak) is a Malaysian footballer. He played as a goalkeeper for Kedah football team and the Malaysia National Team in the early 1990s.

== Biography ==
Azmi was born on 6 May 1967 at Parit Buntar, Perak. He was not raised at Kedah, but he transferred to a local school in Kedah when he is 16 years old. He studied in Sultan Abdul Hamid College (SAHC). When he was studying in SAHC, he was selected to represent Team Kedah Schools in the Rahman Cup Competition during the event held by Schools Sports Council of Malaysia (MSSM). When he was about 17 years old, Azmi from the beginning playing as the goalkeeper, was selected to represent Malaysia as Malaysia Students Football Team in the Asian Schools Football Tournament held in Jakarta, Indonesia. Malaysia Students Football Team finished third in the competition.

== Club career ==
Upon completing his studies, Azmi started to play to the team in the Presidents Cup competition in 1986 to become the focus of sports fans 1988. Beliau home after Kedah team managed to beat the Singapore team in the Malaysia Cup final on 15 December 1990.In 1990, Azmi received the Medal of Divine Justice bestowed by the Sultan of Kedah.

== International career ==
At the age of 20, Azmi was selected to represent Malaysia to compete in FIFA world cup qualifier.
