= Kopaganj =

Kopaganj Kopa
- Town
- Location in Uttar Pradesh, India
- Coordinates: 26.02°N 83.57°E
- Country: India
- State: Uttar Pradesh
- District: Mau
- Elevation: 66 m (217 ft)

Population (2013)
  - Total: 55,865

Languages
  - Official: Hindi
- Time zone: UTC+5:30 (IST)

Kopaganj is a town and a nagar panchayat in Mau district in the Indian state of Uttar Pradesh.

== Geography ==
Kopaganj is located at 26.02°N 83.57°E. It has an average elevation of 66 metres (217 feet).

== Demographics ==
As of 2011 India census, Kopaganj had a population of 55,231. Males constitute 51% of the population and females 49%. Kopaganj has an average literacy rate of 77%, higher than the national average of 74%: male literacy is 82%, and female literacy is 71%. In Kopaganj, 12% of the population is under 6 years of age.

It is one of the oldest town in the district Mau, Uttara Pradesh. The name of the town is derived by the name of queen Kopeshwari Devi, the Grand mother of queen Dhandaie Kunwar. This town has a mix population of Hindus and Muslims with the majority of Muslims. This town is famous for Multy Floors Hanuman Mandir, Oldest Shiv Mandir, Shahi Jama Masjid, and textile industries particularly powerloom sarees.

- Mery children School Kopaganj
- Habib Inter College Kopaganj Mau
- Madarsa Imdadul Uloom Kopaganj
- Majidun Nisa Girls P G College Kopaganj Mau Uttar Pradesh 275305
- Iqbal Oriental Children School
- ARUNA M S H S S REWARI DIH SHAHAROJ MAU
- MADARSA JAFARIYA KOPAGANJ
- B.S.S MAHA VIDHYALAY KOPAGANJ
- MADARSA MISBAHUL ULOOM KOPAGANJ MAU
- MADARSA WASIATUL ULOOM KOPAGANJ MAU
- MADARSA JAMIUL ULOOM KOPAGANJ MAU
- RAJAN PG COLLEGE HIKMA KOPAGANJ MAU

== Religions ==
Religion in Kopaganj (2011)
Religion	Percent
Islam	80%
Hinduism	20%
Sikhism	0.01%
Jainism	0.01%
Christianity	0.30%
Buddhism	0.02%
Others	0.06%

== Economy ==
There are approximately 2000 power looms in Kopaganj, manufacturing the cotton and linen sarees. This is the main source of income. There is also a large plant for polished rice and paddy mill. The outskirts of the town are engaged in agricultural activity.
