= Qamaruzzaman Azmi =

Islamic scholar and speaker

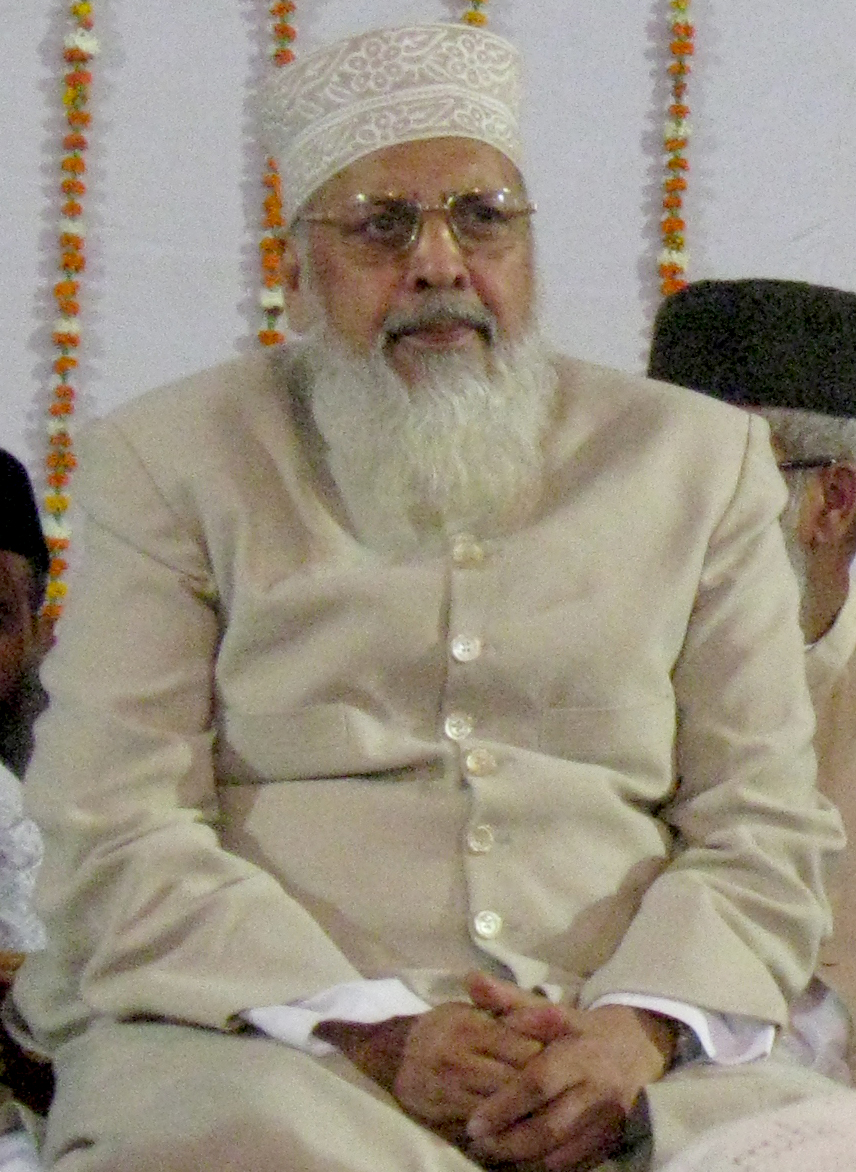
- Azmi in 2011

Personal life
- Born: 23 March 1946 (age 80) Khalispur, Sagri, Azamgarh
- Era: Modern
- Region: Europe
- Main interest(s): Islamic theology, Hadith, Tafsir, Hanafi jurisprudence, Urdu poetry, Tasawwuf, Science, Philosophy, Psychology, Astronomy
- Notable idea: Opposition to terrorism
- Education: Madarsa Arbiya Anwarul Uloom, Jiyanpur, Azamgarh; Al Jamiatul Ashrafia, Mubarakpur, Azamgarh; Darul Uloom Nadwatul Ulama, Lucknow
- Occupation: Islamic Scholar
- Website: allamaazmi.com

Religious life
- Religion: Islam
- Denomination: Sunni
- Jurisprudence: Hanafi
- Tariqa: Qadri
- Creed: Maturidi
- Movement: Barelvi

Muslim leader
- Teacher: Hafiz-e-Millat Allama Shah Abdul Azeez Muradabadi
- Disciple of: Mustafa Raza Khan Qadri
- Influenced by: Abu Hanifa Abdul Qadir Gilani Mu'in al-Din Chishti Nizamuddin Auliya Al-Suyuti Ibn Abidin Qadi Iyad Ahmed Raza Khan Barelvi Akhtar Raza Khan
- Awards: Mufti-e-Azam Gold medal

Qamaruzzaman Azmi (born 23 March 1946), also known as Allama Azmi, is an Indian Islamic scholar, philosopher and speaker. He is president of the World Islamic Mission. From 2011 to 2021, he was listed in The 500 Most Influential Muslims in the world by the Royal Aal al-Bayt Institute for Islamic Thought due to his efforts to build organisations and institutions, mosques, colleges, and universities for over five decades. He is the patron in chief of Sunni Dawat-e-Islami, an Islamic movement having branches around the world.

== Life ==
Azmi was graduated from Al Jamiatul Ashrafia in 1966. He studied all Islamic sciences in depth with his honourable teachers. His grasp on Fiqh, Hadith and History is well known. He was commissioned in 1966 by Abdul Aziz Muradabadi to go Faizabad (near Lucknow) to start his missionary work. There at the age of eighteen years he established the Islamic university, Al-Jame-atul-Islamia. He is also considered by some to be the spiritual heir of Mustafa Raza Khan, son of Ahmed Raza Khan Barelvi.

On 7 August 2013, Prime Minister David Cameron, along with Faiths Minister Baroness Sayeeda Warsi, met Azmi.

== Islamic missionary activities ==
Azmi has helped to build organisations and institutions including mosques, colleges and universities in the United Kingdom, America, Canada, Netherlands, Germany, Norway, Belgium and India. These centers were established with his direct support and supervision.

- India
- Al-jamiat-ul-Islamia (Islamiya University) Rounahi, Faizabad, India -affiliated to the prestigious Al-Azhar University, Cairo, Egypt

Bradford

- Islamic Missionary College (IMC) Bradford
- International Dar-ul-Ifta Bradford

Manchester

- Ibad-ur-Rehaman Trust
- North Manchester Jamia Mosque -with capacity to hold 2,500 worshipers
- Institution Kulliyat-ud-Dirasatil Islamiya (College of Islamic studies)

His continuous speeches helped become Jamat-e-Islami influenced, Southerland Mosque part of part the Sunni Barelvi. He also participated in the establishment of Masjid Noor-ul-Islam Bolton and in the establishment of Ghamkol Shariff Masjid at Birmingham.

- United States

He participated in the construction of Masjid-e-Al Noor, Houston, America and in Islamic Center Chicago.

- Norway

The World Islamic Mission's mosque in Oslo, Norway was established in 1980.

- Canada
- Masjid Noor-ul-Haram, Toronto

== Hejaz Conference ==
The 1985 Hejaz Conference at the Wembley Centre, London marked a watershed for Sunni Muslims which was attended by key religious leaders from around the world with the aim to discuss the barbaric treatment of Sunni pilgrims by Wahabi Saudi police and the ban in Saudi Arabia on Kanzul Iman the translation of the Quran by Imam Ahmed Raza. The Conference was widely covered by British Media and made a huge impact. It forced Saudi King Fahad and with in two years Saudi government allowed the Muslims of all movements/sects to perform the religious rituals in Makkah and Medina, according to their respective beliefs.

== View about him ==
Times of India wrote about him, There are two kinds of Sunni Muslims in the world: those who have met or heard Allama Qamaruzzaman Azmi and those who haven't. His lucid speeches peppered with repeated references to Quranic commandments and the life of the Prophet and his companions have a charismatic effect; they go straight to the heart. Unlike many rabble-rousing parochial preachers and Islam-supremacist televangelists Azmi uses words to calm nerves, close breaches and salve wounds.

Jim Karygiannis M.P., House of Commons, Canada on 13 July 2002 awarded a certificate of commendation to Allama Azmi for his services and wrote: In my capacity as Member of Parliament it gives me great pleasure to commend the renowned Islamic scholar Maulana Qamaruzzaman Azmi.

== Views ==
Phillip Lewis quotes Azmi in his 1994 book Islamic Britain: Religion, Politics and Identity among British Muslims, that Islam and secular society can co-exist and "the widely shared perception that secular necessarily implies irreligion is simply wrong. In India, he contends, a secular state can offer security to Muslims since it is compatible with acknowledging that religion is important and, that in a religiously plural environment the state does not allow believers in one religious tradition to enjoy a privileged status. All are citizens with equal rights. Indeed, in India, Muslims are allowed to conform to their own Muslim family law".

Azmi has opposed the practice of female genital mutilation. Azmi also holds that Aisha, the third wife of the Muslim prophet Muhammad, was an example of a strong and intelligent female role model.

He has also opposed extremism and terrorism and argues that those who use the name of Islam for such acts are, in fact, Islam's enemies. He endorsed a fatwa against Britons joining Islamic extremists.

On the murder of British aid worker David Cawthorne Haines by the Islamic State of Iraq and the Levant, he said "we condemn this act of evil by people who are pure evil. There is no legitimacy for such evilness in Islam".

He condemns the persecution of Christians and other non-Muslims, arguing that the perpetrators "are not Muslims because Islam teaches the importance of ensuring a good place in society for all people".

== Teachers ==
His teachers include following scholars.

- Hafiz-e-Millat Allama Abdul Aziz Muradabadi (Founder of Al Jamiatul Ashrafia)
- Ustadhul Ulama Allama Hafiz Abdul Raoof Balyawi
- Bahrul Uloom Allama Mufti Abdul Mannan Azmi
- Ashraful Ulama Allama Sayyid Hamid Ashraf

== See also ==
- Azmi (disambiguation)
- North Manchester Jamia Mosque
- World Islamic Mission
