= Zalzala (book) =

Book by Arshadul Qadri

- Author: Arshadul Qadri
- Language: Urdu, English, Bangla, Hindi
- Series: Deobandi Fitna Ka Radd
- Genre: Refutation
- Published: 1974
- Publication date: 1974
- Publication place: India

Zalzala (trans: Earthquake) is a treatise written by Arshadul Qadri, an Indian Islamic scholar in 1972. It is widely known as the most known book of Qadri written as Barelvi response to Deobandi beliefs about Prophet Muhammad based on books written by Ashraf Ali Thanwi, Qasim Nanautvi and other Deobandi Ulamas.

This book is in the syllabus of hundreds of Madrasas and Institutions in India, Pakistan and Bangladesh. It has different chapters discussing different faiths of Deobandi movement against the beliefs of Islam and Prophet Muhammad. It is written with the reference to Older texts and new texts like Fatawa-e-Razaviyya and Husamul Haramain.

== Response ==
In response to this book many Deobandi people have written books, including Inkishāf 'Zalzalah' ke baʻd by Mufti Abdul Jalil in 1974, Zalzala: Barelvi Fitna Ka Roop Arshadul Qadri Sahab Ki Kitab Zalzala Ka Tanqeedi Jaiza Aur Tahqeeqi Jaiza by Muhammad Arif Sambhali in 1974, Zalzala Par Zalzala by Najmuddin Ahiyai in 1975 and Tawheed Ka Khanjar: Tawheed Ke Haqeeqat Quran Wa Hadees Ke Raushni Mein Arshadul Qadri Ki Kitab Aur Meer Wa Mubr Jaisi Zahreeli Kitabon Ka Dandan Shikan Jawab by Imam Ali Danish in 1999.
