= Al-Jame-atul-Islamia =

Islamic seminary of Sunni-Barelvi Muslims in India

Al-Jame-atul Islamia
- Type: Islamic university
- Established: 1964; 62 years ago
- Rector: Qamaruzzaman Azmi
- Principal: Maulana Md. Ayuub Rizvi
- Location: Ayodhya District, Uttar Pradesh, India

Al-Jame-atul Islamia is an Islamic seminary of Sunni-Barelvi Muslims in India. It is located in Raunahi, Ayodhya District, near Lucknow, in the north Indian state of Uttar Pradesh in India.

== History ==
Al-Jame-atul-Islamia was founded in 1964 by Qamaruzzaman Azmi. Azmi was supported by a core team of key people such as Dr Syed Mahfoozur Rahman, Dr Syed Habibur Rahman, Syed Mohammed IlyasH, Alhaaj Shamiuallah Khan, Haji Sagir Ahmed Khan( Kolkata), Akhlaque Khana (Delhi), Mustaque Ahmad, Munne Khan, Itlafat Ahamd Khan, Mohammed Riyaz Khan and Waseem Ahmad and in 1974, Jalaluddin Quadri was appointed as Manager. The degrees of Al-Jame-atul-Islamia are recognized by universities of India and abroad like:

- Al-Azhar University, Cairo, Egypt
- Aligarh Muslim University
- Jamia Millia Islamia, Delhi University
- Jawaharlal Nehru University.

== Affiliation and Alumni ==
Al-Jame-atul-Islamia is affiliated to Al-Azhar University, Cairo, Egypt and some of the student graduates at Al-Azhar University include:

- Maulana Taj Muhammad Khan, Sultanpur, U.P. Graduated from Alazhar 2004
- Maulana Muhammad Ayub Qadri, Moradabad, U.P. Graduated from Alazhar 2008
- Maulana Muhammad Arkan Rizvi, J.P. Nagar, U.P. Graduated from Alazhar 2008
- Maulana Faheem Ahmad Saqleni, Badaun, U.P. Graduated from Alazhar 2008
- Maulana Ataul Mustafa Qadri, Bareilly, U.P. Graduated from Alazhar 2008
- Maulana Sarfaraz Ahmad Meman, Surat Gujarat, Graduated from Alazhar 2008
- Maulana Mahmood Alam, Moradabad, U.P. Graduated from Alazhar at 2009, and doing Post Graduation from same Faculty.
- Maulana Abdul Moid, RaeBarielly, U.P. Graduated from Alazhar at 2009
- Maulana Ali Hasan Alvi, Bahraich, U.P. Graduated from Alazhar at 2009
- Maulana Ashfaq Husain, Gonda, U.P. Graduated from Alazhar at 2009
- Maulana Muhammad Ayub Khan, Bahraich, U.P. Graduated from Alazhar at 2010
- Maulana aqeel Ahmad, balrampur, U.P. Graduated from Alazhar at 2010, completing MA at Alazhar.
- Maulna Abdul Mustafa, Balrampur, U.P Graduated from Alazhar at 2009.

== Departments ==
The Jamia has following departments.

- Primary Section
- Department of Hifz
- Department of Tajweed and Quirat
- Department of Alia (up to M.A.Degree)
- Interpretation of the Holy Quran
- Department of preaching and propagation
- Department of Ifta (religious decree)
- Department of research & publication
- Department of Journalism
- Department of computer
- Department of Arabic Literature

== Some famous lecturers ==
- Mufti Shabeer Hasan Rizvi, Head of Islamic law and fatwa
- Maulana Muhammad Ayub Rizvi, Principal
- Maulana Noman Khan, Previous Principal
- Maulana Vasi Ahamd Vasi Siddiqi, Vice Principal
- Muhammad Bakhshullah Qadri, Vice Head of Shaikhul Hadith
- Maulana Juned Ahmad Naim, Head of Arabi language and literature
- Maulana Shakir Husain
- Master Abdul Khaleeq Ahmad, Head of English department
- Hazarata Qari sartaj Ahmad, Head of Hifz Department
- Qari Abdul Lateef
- Maulana Gulam Murtaza
- Qari Ali Akbar
- Maulana Salman Khan Hindi
- Shabbeer Ahmad (Muballigh Saheb)
- maulana sharif misbahi azhari
- maulana aqil ahmad misbahi amjadi
- maulana nasir misbahi
- maulan azharuddin jamai

== Students ==
In 2011 Al-Jamiatul Islamia witnessed four hundred Ulemas graduate at the hands of its founder Muffakir-e-Islam Qamaruzzaman Azmi at the annual graduation ceremony. Many students of this institution are now working in different parts of the world in South Africa, UK, USA, Canada, Holland, Mauritius and the Middle East. Some of the famous students include the Mufti-e-Azam of America, Allama Mufti Qamar-ul-Hassan, the Chief Imam of Scotland's Khizra Mosque Allama Faroghul Quadri, Mufti Shamshul Huda in Dewsbury, UK, Dr Waqar Azmi OBE, UK Government's former Chief Diversity Adviser, Allama Abdul Mannan Jama'ee, Holland, Allama Khalid Razvi, Leicester, UK and Sayyad Moinuddin Ashraf (Moin Miya'n) Sajjada Nasheen, Kicchocha Sharif.

== See also ==
- List of Islamic educational institutions
- Karwan-I-Islami
- Islam in India
- Jamiatur Raza
- Al Jamiatul Ashrafia
- Manzar-e-Islam
