= Arshadul Qadri =

Indian Islamic scholar (1925–2002)

His Eminence Hafiz-e-Millat Allama Arshadul Qadri
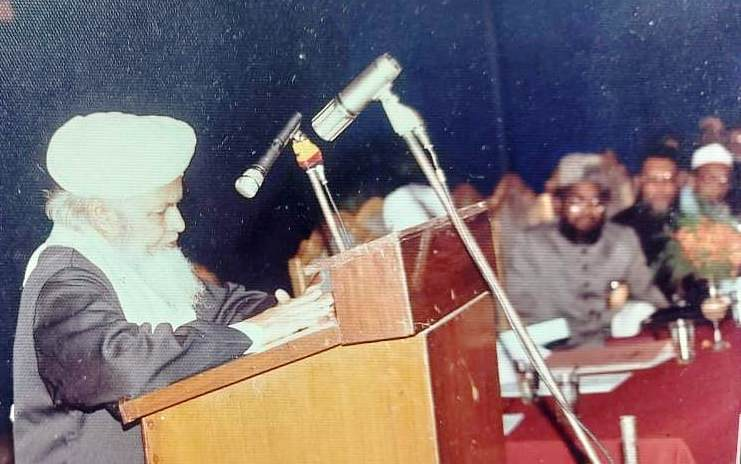

Personal life
- Born: 5 March 1925 (British Raj) Sayyidpura, Balia, Uttar Pradesh, India
- Died: 29 April 2002 (aged 77) Jamshedpur, India
- Children: 5 son 1 daughter

Religious life
- Religion: Islam
- Denomination: Sunni
- Founder of: World Islamic Mission; Jamia Hazrat Nizamuddin Aulia (A Sunni Madrasa)
- Jurisprudence: Hanafi
- Creed: Maturidi
- Movement: Barelvi
- Profession: Islamic scholar

Muslim leader
- Period in office: Modern era
- Predecessor: Maulana Abdul Latif

Arshadul Qadri (5 March 1925 – 29 April 2002) was a Sunni Islamic scholar, author and missionary activist in India associated with the Barelvi movement who established several educational institutions and organizations in India.

== Early life and education ==
He was born in 1925, in "Sayyidpura", Balia, Uttar Pradesh, India in the family of Maulana Abdul Latif who was himself a religious scholar. His grandfather Maulana Azeemullah Shah was also scholar of repute. He received his basic and intermediate education under his grandfather and father then to continue his higher education he moved to Al Jamiatul Ashrafia Islamic seminary. At Ashrafia, he studied under the supervision of Shah Abdul Aziz Moradabadi also known as Hafiz-e-Millat and completed his education from Ashrafia, Mubarakpur in 1944.

== Organizational work ==
Many prominent Sunni Islamic organizations and institutions were established by his efforts. He and other Pakistani Sunni scholars established Dawat e Islami and selected Ilyas Qadri as its head.

He also established Madinatul Islam, the Hague (Netherlands), Islamic Missionary College (Bradford, Britain), Darul Uloom Aleemia (Suriname, America), Jamia Amjadia Rizvia Ghosi, Jamia Faizul Uloom (Jamshedpur), Darul Ziaul Islam (Howrah), Darul Uloom Makhdumia (Guwahati), Madrasa Madinatul Uloom (Bangalore), Faizul Uloom High School, (Jamshedpur) and Jamia Hazrat Nizamuddin Auliya (New Delhi).

He was influential in establishing the World Islamic Mission which is an umbrella organisation for Sunni Barelvi in the United Kingdom and in Europe.

Allama established Idaarah-i-Shar'iayh (Shara'ai Council) (Patna, Bihar), All India Muslim Personal Law Conference at Siwan, Bihar and All India Muslim United Front Raipur, Chhattisgarh.

Qadri was appointed the first Secretary General of World Islamic Mission with its head office located in Bradford, England. Islamic scholar and present leader of WIM Qamaruzzaman Azmi stated, 'Allama Arshadul Qadri's work in England was to lay the proper foundations of Ahle Sunna wal Jam'aat which would give rise to an intellectually sound and spiritually based Islam in Europe'. The plan of the project of Bihar Madrasa Education Board and its establishment was his work.

=== All India Muslim Personal Law Conference ===
Qadri along with Obaidullah Azmi as its general secretary founded the All India Muslim Personal Law Conference against the All India Muslim Personal Law Board in 1986, however the organisation haven’t worked good in the field and it was stopped running in 1990s.

== Books ==
His books include:

- Tableeghi Jama'at
- Zer-o-Zabar
- Lala Zar
- Zalzala
- Daawate Insaf
- Anwaar-i-Ahmadi
- Dil Ki Muraad
- Jalwah-i-Haq
- Shari'at
- Lisaanul Firdaus
- Misbaahul Qur'an (Three Volumes)
- Naqsh-i-Khatam (12)
- Tafseer-i-Surah-i-Fatiha
- Khutbaat-i-Istiqbaaliyah
- Tajilliyaat-i-Raza
- Da'wat-i-Insaaf
- Ta'zeerat-i-Qalam
- Aik Walwalah Angez Khitaab
- Shakhsiyaat
- Hadith, Fiqh Aur Ijtihad ki Shar'ee Haisiyat
- Aini Mushadaat
- Bazubaan-i-Hikaayat
- Izhaar-i-'Aqeedat (a collection of poems)
- Afkaar wa Khayaalaat (a collection of articles)
- Sadaa-i-Qalam (a collection of letters)
- Jama'at-i-Islami

== Biography ==
Zia'ul Mustafa Quadri has written a biography of Arshadul Quadri entitled Hayat-o-Khidmat (Life and Works of Huzoor Sadrush Shariah). Teacher of Allama Arshadul qadri: Arshadul Qadri was a student of Huzur Amine Shariat Shah Rafaqat Husain Mehboobe Khuda.

== Death ==
He died on the 29 April 2002 and was buried in the at Faizul Uloom Madarsa in Jamshedpur, Jharkhand.

== See also ==
- World Islamic Mission
- Qamaruzzaman Azmi
