= Obaidullah Khan Azmi =

Indian politician

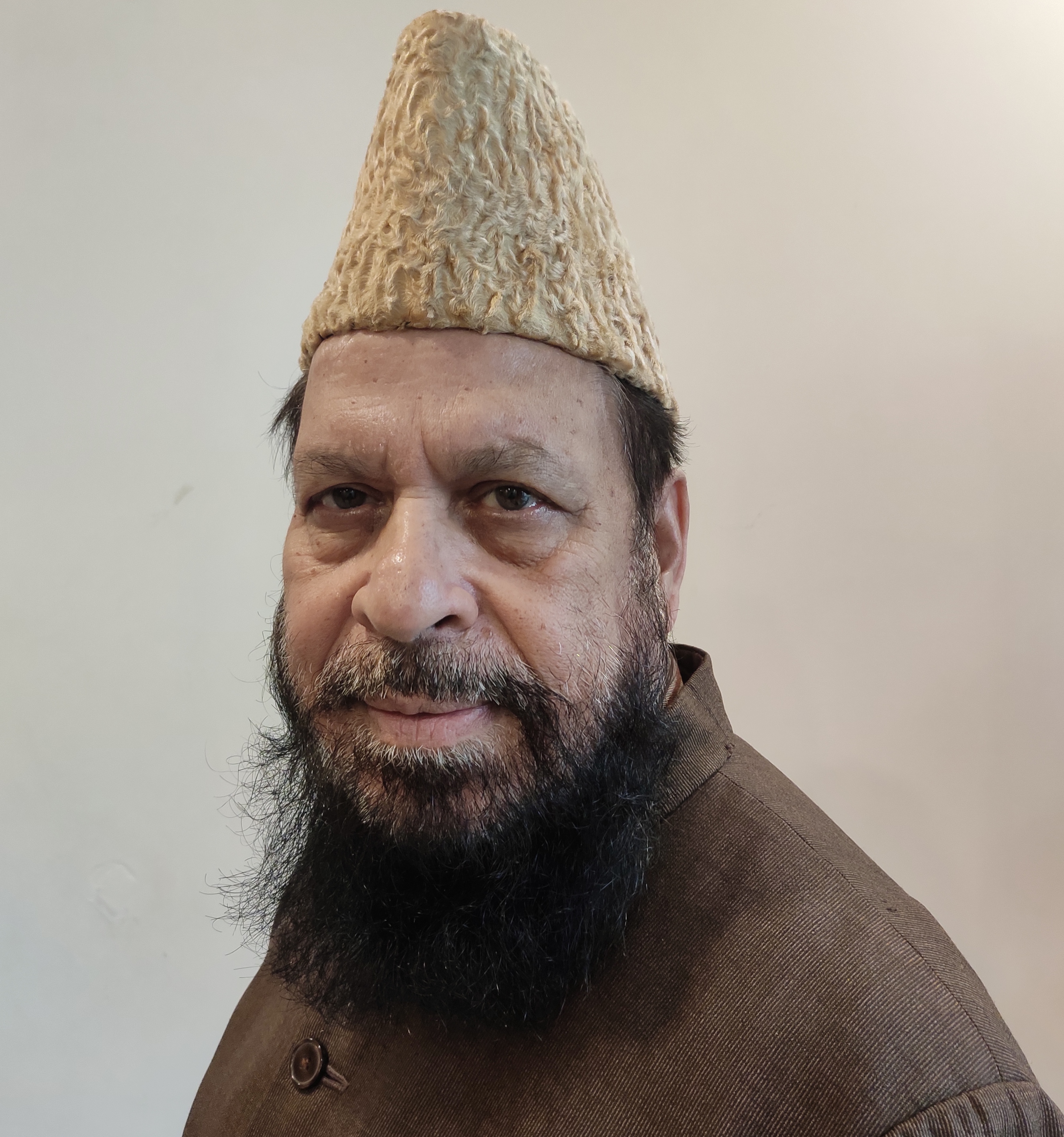

Member of Rajya Sabha
- In office 1990–2008
- Constituency: Madhya Pradesh

Personal details
- Born: 11 March 1949 (age 77) Khalispur, United Provinces, India
- Party: Janata Dal (Secular) (2023-present)
- Other political affiliations: Janata Dal; Indian National Congress; Samajwadi Party (till 2010); Nationalist Congress Party (2014)
- Spouse: Syeda Razia Obaid Khan
- Children: Three sons and five daughters
- Profession: Politician

Obaidullah Khan Azmi is an Indian Politician and Islamic scholar, belonging to the Sunni strand of Islam. He joined Janata Dal (Secular) on 13 March 2023. He was a member of Rajya Sabha, the upper house of the Indian Parliament from 1990 to 2008. He represented Uttar Pradesh during 1990-96 and from Jharkhand during 1996–2002 from Janata Dal party. During 1992–1996, he was General Secretary of Janata Dal and later became its Senior Vice-president. From 2002 to 2008 he represented Madhya Pradesh from Indian National Congress.

He is the founder member of All India Muslim Personal Law Board (AIMPLB) since 1973 and later went against it to form All-India Muslim Personal Law Conference (AIMPLC) with Arshadul Qadri in 1986 but the newly formed organization didn't work and later became a board member of AIMPLB.

He was known as a great speaker of his time.

== Shah Bano case protest ==
Obaidullah Khan Azmi became popular by his public speeches against Supreme Court Judgment in Shah Bano case. The audio cassettes of his speech were widely circulated and sold. He, at the time, had become a most sought-after speaker for anti-Shah Bano case meetings in Mumbai. Mumbai police filed case against the Maulana and expelled him from Mumbai declaring his speeches inflammatory.

== Scholarly works ==
- Khutbaat-e-Azmi (Aazadi-e-Hind Aur Allama Fazle Haq Khairabadi)

== See also ==
- Asaduddin Owaisi
- Tauqeer Raza Khan
