= Mau, Uttar Pradesh =

Mau
- City
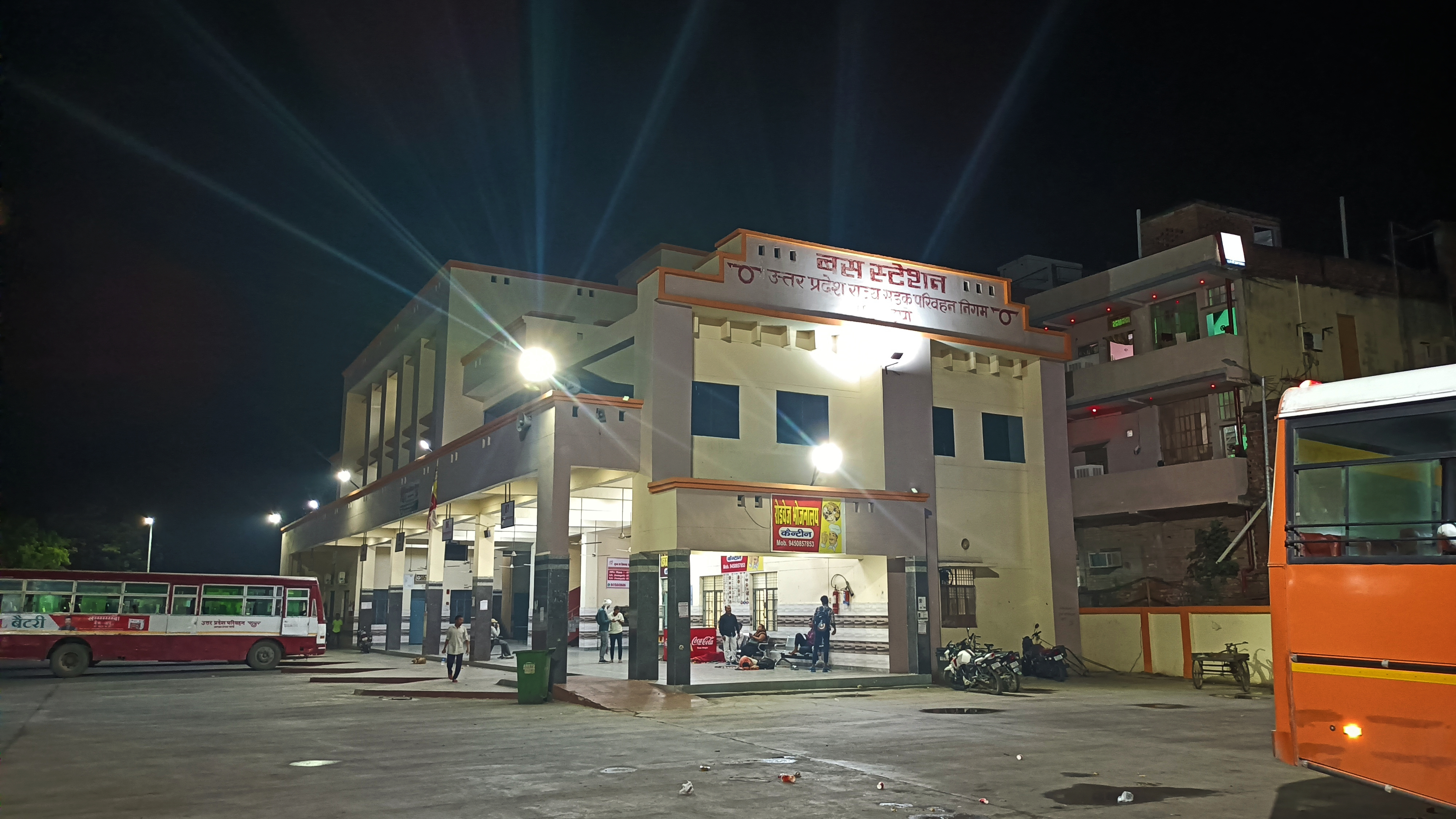
- Mau bus Stop

- Location within Uttar Pradesh
- Coordinates: 25°56′30″N 83°33′40″E
- Country: India
- State: Uttar Pradesh
- District: Mau
- Established: 1989

Government
  - Type: Municipal Council
  - Body: Arshad Jamal (Chairman)

Area
  - Total: 20 km^{2} (7.7 sq mi)
- Elevation: 63 m (207 ft)

Population (2011)
  - Total: 278,745
  - Density: 14,000/km^{2} (36,000/sq mi)

Languages
  - Official: Hindi, Urdu
  - Regional: Bhojpuri
- Time zone: UTC+5:30 (IST)
- PIN: 275101
- Telephone code: +0547
- Vehicle registration: UP-54
- Sex ratio: 978 (as of 2011) ♀/♂
- Website: www.mau.nic.in

Mau, also now known as Maunath Bhanjan, is an industrial town and the headquarter of the Mau district. It is located in the eastern part of Uttar Pradesh, India. The town is known for its saree industry which is a traditional business and centuries old art of the people of this city.

== History ==
From historical and archaeological point of views, Mau is one of the oldest places in the region. Ancient cultural and archaeological remains have been found at multiple places in the area giving enough evidence of long history of human habitat in the area. The known archaeological history of Mau is about 1500 years old, when the entire area was covered under thick dense forest. The nuts who used to live along Tamsa river, are considered to be the oldest inhabitants and the ruler of the area.

As per the records on official webpage of the district, in 1028 A.D. King Syed Shalar Masood Ghazi came with a huge army to conquer the area but he went back to Afghanistan, leaving few of his people in the area. A Sufi saint Baba Malik Tahir and his brother Malik Qasim were part of the remaining group. There are places like Malik Tahir Pura and Qasim Pura in the name of these two saints in Mau city. The tomb of Malik Tahir is also present in Malik Tahir Pura and locally known as Mazaar Malik Tahir Baba.

Around 1540-1545, Sher Shah Suri, the famous emperor who defeated Humayun, during his reign visited Kolhuvavan (Madhuban) to meet the great Sufi saint Syed Ahmad Wadva. Mahvani, one of the daughters of Sher Shah had settled permanently near the dargah of Syed Wadva. The area also finds place in the historical book of Ziyaudeen Barni with a description that the great Mughal emperor Akbar passed through Mau on his way to Allahabad. Since time immortal, labourer and artisans who were the original inhabitants of this land has kept the fine saree art work alive and despite a gradual decline of the handloom industry in the eastern Uttar Pradesh, the saree industry of Mau still remains the last bastion of handicraft in the area otherwise an industrially thriving region till the end of last century. It is also believed that one of Shah Jahan's daughter, Jahanara Begum had also settled in that area where she built a mosque. The original structure of the mosque is not surviving anymore but place is known as Shahi Qatra and there is a Shahi Mosque in that locality reminding of its past glory.

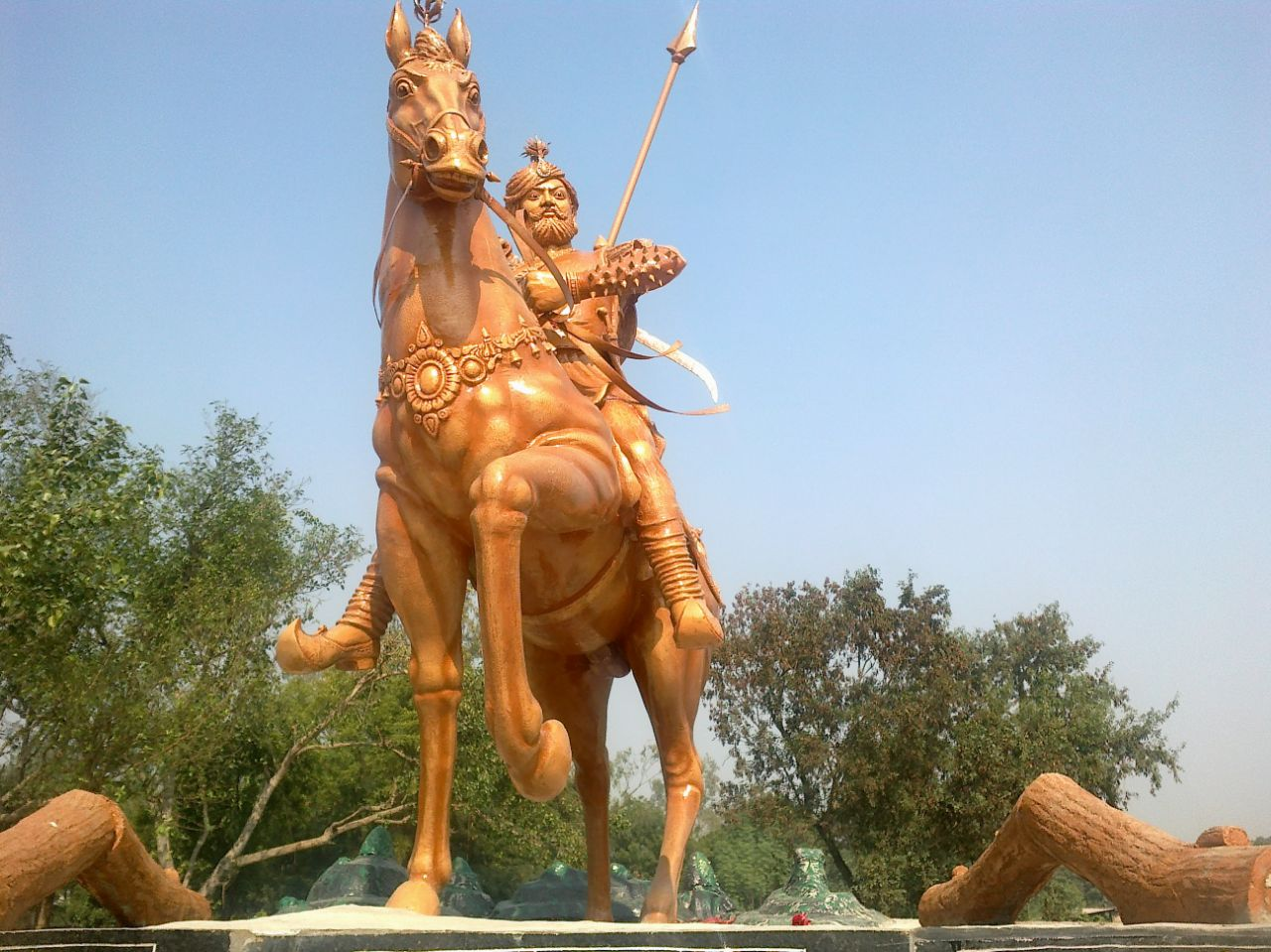
Statue of Thakur Barisan Dev

During the Indian freedom struggle, the people of Mau had given full support to the movement, and Mahatma Gandhi had also made a visit to Doharighat region in Ghosi Tehsil of the district in 1939.

In 1932, Azamgarh was made independent district, Mau region was a part of it until 1988 when the current area of Mau district was carved out of Azamgarh on 19 November 1988 to make Mau a separate district in which the then Union Minister of State of India (Power) Kalpnath Rai played a pivotal role. He is also credited to start an array of developmental activities in the city including new Railway Station and a stadium.

== Economy ==
Mau is industrial town of eastern UP. After demise of textile industry of Banaras and Mubarakpur, Mau stands as one of the last bastion of textile hubs of UP. A 1998–99 survey of Ministry of Small and Medium Enterprises (MSME) puts number of powerlooms at 58,381.

There are speculations that this huge industry will benefit if GI is awarded to Mau as well as if clusters (of powerlooms, resembling modern industry) are encouraged. But as of date only one cluster has been identified as Palki Industries Pvt. Ltd. with 4100 units as per MSME survey of 2012. Mau also contains three small industrial areas in Tajopur, Shahadatpura and Ghosi.

== Education ==
=== Intermediate college ===
- Talimuddin Inter College
- Talimuddin Girl's Inter College
- Talimuddin Girl's PG College
- Muslim Inter College
- DAV Inter College
- Nomani Inter College
- Jeevan Ram Inter College
- SADHNA DHEERU PG College
- D.C.S.K PG College

=== Islamic seminaries ===
- Al-Jameatul Islamia Faiz-E-Aam
- Darul Uloom Mau
- Al-Jamiatul Asaria Darul Hadees
- Jamia Hanfiya Ahle Sunnat Bahrul Uloom
- Jamia Alia Arabia

== Weather ==
Climate data for Mau
Month	Jan	Feb	Mar	Apr	May	Jun	Jul	Aug	Sep	Oct	Nov	Dec	Year
Mean daily maximum °C (°F)	23 (73)	26 (79)	33 (91)	39 (102)	42 (108)	40 (104)	34 (93)	33 (91)	33 (91)	33 (91)	29 (84)	25 (77)	33 (90)
Mean daily minimum °C (°F)	9 (48)	11 (52)	16 (61)	22 (72)	26 (79)	28 (82)	26 (79)	26 (79)	24 (75)	20 (68)	14 (57)	10 (50)	19 (67)
Average precipitation mm (inches)	12 (0.5)	18 (0.7)	9 (0.4)	0 (0)	0 (0)	96 (3.8)	144 (5.7)	162 (6.4)	201 (7.9)	24 (0.9)	3 (0.1)	6 (0.2)	675 (26.6)
Source: [Mau Weather]

== Demographics ==
Religions in Mau (2011)
Religion	Percent
Islam	56.76%
Hinduism	42.98%
Other or not stated	0.26%
Distribution of religions

As per the census of 2011, Mau had a population of 278,745 of which 142,967 are males while 135,778 are females. Population of children with age from 0 to 6 is 42,216 which is 15.15% of total population of Mau. Female Sex Ratio is of 950 against state average of 912 and Child Sex Ratio in Mau is around 952 compared to Uttar Pradesh state average of 902. Literacy rate of Mau city is 77.13% which is higher than the state average of 67.68%. Male literacy is around 82.37% while female literacy rate is 71.60%. Scheduled Castes make up 10.08% of the population.

Languages in Mau (2011)
1. Urdu (55.7%)
2. Hindi (29.3%)
3. Bhojpuri (14.7%)
4. Others (0.35%)

Mau is a Nagar Palika Parishad city and it is divided into 36 wards for which elections are held every five years. Mau Nagar Palika Parishad has total administration over 41,078 houses to which it supplies basic amenities like water and sewerage. It is also authorized to build roads within Nagar Palika Parishad limits and impose taxes on properties coming under its jurisdiction.

There are 978 females for every 1000 males. The child sex ratio of girls is 946 per 1000 boys in Mau, which is above the national average of 940.

[Bhojpuri] is the most spoken language. Other languages such as Hindi Bhojpuri, are spoken by a minority.

== See also ==
- Kalpnath Rai
- Fagu Chauhan
- Dara Singh Chauhan
- Ram Bilash Chauhan
- Algu Rai Shashtri
- Jharkhande Rai
- Rajeev Rai
- Maunath Bhanjan
- Fiza Ibn-e-Faizi
- Atul Kumar Anjaan
- Laxmi Narayan Mishra
- Shyam Narayan Pandey
- Amjad Ali Aazmi
- Yaseen Akhtar Misbahi
- Muhammad Mustafa Al-A'zami
- Habib Al-Rahman Al-Azmi
- Habibur Rahman Nomani
- Ziaul Mustafa Razvi Qadri
- Saeed-ur-Rahman Azmi Nadvi
- Salim Ansari
- Abdul Ghaffar Mauwi
- Haji Minnatullah
