= Mau district =

Coordinates: 25°56′N 83°34′E

- District
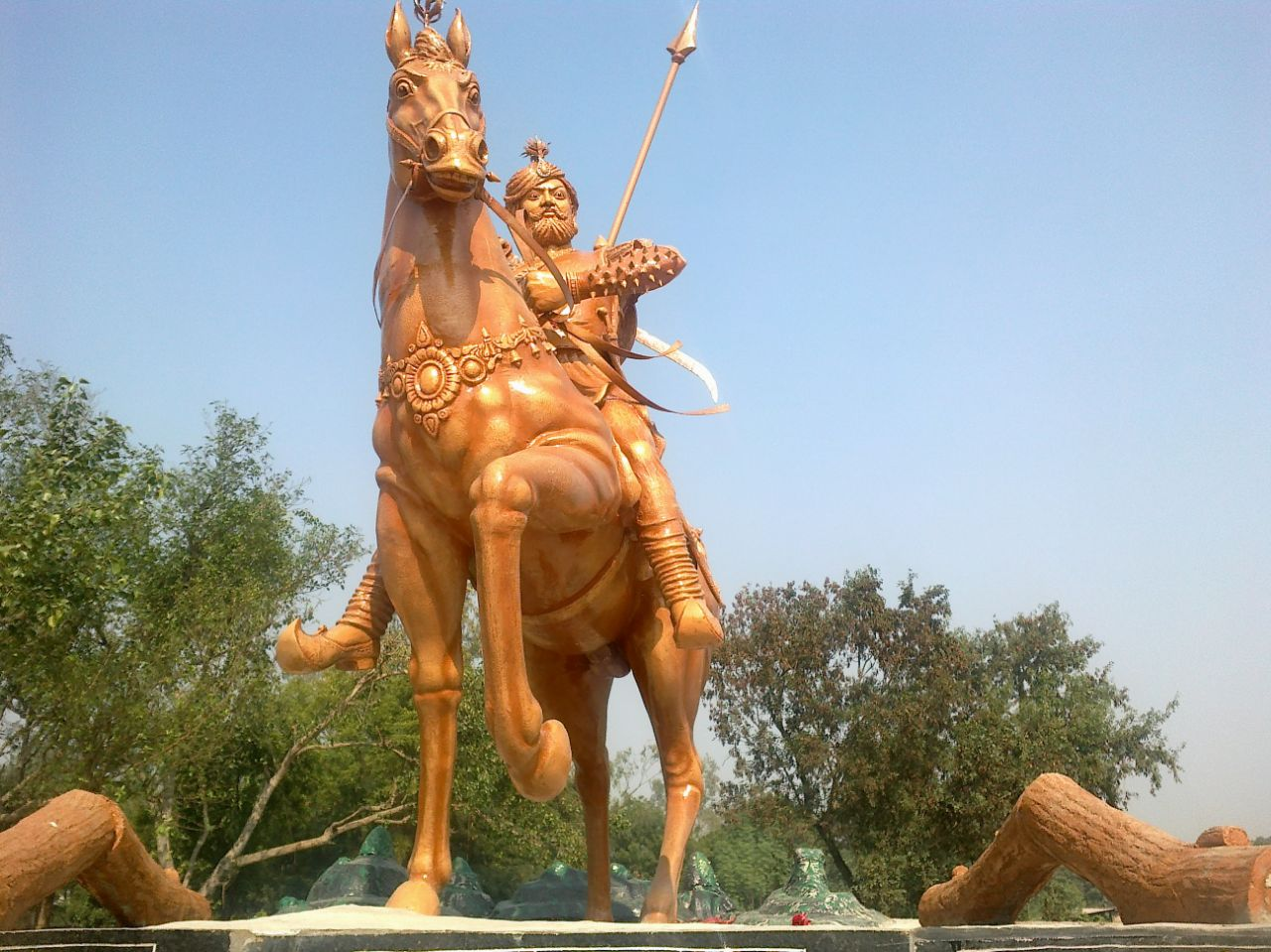
- Statue of Thakur Barisan Dev in Mau

- Location of Mau district in Uttar Pradesh
- Country: India
- State: Uttar Pradesh
- Division: Azamgarh
- Headquarters: Mau
- Tehsils: Mau Ghosi

Government
  - Lok Sabha constituencies: Ghosi
  - Vidhan Sabha constituencies: Ghosi, Madhuban, Maunath Bhanjan (Sadar), Muhammadabad-Gohna Assembly constituency

Area
  - Total: 1,713 km^{2} (661 sq mi)

Population (2011)
  - Total: 2,205,968
  - Density: 1,288/km^{2} (3,335/sq mi)

Demographics
  - Literacy: 80.16 per cent
  - Sex ratio: 978
- Time zone: UTC+05:30 (IST)
- Major highways: NH-24
- Website: mau.nic.in

Mau district is one of the districts of Uttar Pradesh state of India, and Mau town is the district headquarters which is also one of the few remaining areas of handloom saree production in eastern Uttar Pradesh, specializing in Sadiya silk sarees. Mau was carved out as a separate district from Azamgarh on 19 November 1988. It is situated in the south-eastern part of the state with headquarters in Maunath Bhanjan. The district is surrounded by Ghazipur district to the south, Ballia district in the east, Azamgarh district in the west, and by Gorakhpur and Deoria districts to the north .

== History ==
From historical and archaeological point of views, Mau is one of the oldest place in the region. Ancient cultural and archaeological remains have been found at multiple places in the area giving enough evidence of long history of human habitat in the area. The known archaeological history of Mau is about 1,500 years old, when the entire area was covered under thick dense forest. The Nats who used to live along Tamsa river, are considered to be the oldest inhabitants and the ruler of the area.

As per the records on official webpage of the district, in 1028 A.D. King Syed Shalar Masood Ghazi came with a huge army to conquer the area but he went back to Afghanistan, leaving few of his people in the area. A sufi saint Baba Malik Tahir and his brother Malik Qasim were part of the remaining group. There are places like Malik Tahir Pura and Qasim Pura in the name of these two saints in Mau city. The tomb of Malik Tahir is also present in Malik Tahir Pura and locally known as Mazaar Malik Tahir Baba.

Around 1540–1545, Sher Shah Suri, the emperor who defeated Humayun, during his reign visited Kolhuvavan (Madhuban) to meet the great Sufi saint Syed Ahmad Wadva. Mahvani, one of the daughters of Sher Shah had settled permanently near the dargah of Syed Wadva. The area also finds place in the historical book of Ziyaudeen Barni with a description that the great Mughal emperor Akbar passed through Mau on his way to Allahabad. At that time, labourer and artisans originally belonging to Iran, Afghanistan and Turkey, who had come with Mughal army settled here permanently. These artisans integrated into the society over a period of time but they kept their art alive and despite a gradual demise of the handloom industry in the eastern Uttar Pradesh, the saree industry of Mau still remains the last bastion of handicraft in the area otherwise an industrially thriving region till the end of last century. It is also believed that one of Akbar's daughters, Jahan Aara had also settled in that area where she built a mosque. The original structure of the mosque is not surviving anymore but place is known as Shahi Qatra and there is a Shahi Mosque in that locality reminding of its past glory.

During the Indian freedom struggle, the people of Mau had given full support to the movement, and Mahatma Gandhi had also made a visit to Doharighat region of the district in 1939.

In 1932, Azamgarh was made independent district, Mau region was a part of it until 1988 when the current area of Mau district was carved out of Azamgarh to make a separate district and on 19 November 1988, Mau became a separate district in which the then Union Minister of State of India (Power) Kalpnath Rai played a pivotal role. He is also credited to start an array of developmental activities in the city including new Railway Station and a stadium.

== In popular culture ==
A Passage to India is a 1924 novel by English author E. M. Forster set against the backdrop of the British Raj and the Indian independence movement in the 1920s. The novel was adapted in a film with same title in 1984. One of the protagonists, Aziz moved to Mau where he met a school master Cyril Fielding.

== Demographics ==
Historical population
Year	Pop.	±% p.a.
1901	486,949	—
1911	464,472	−0.47%
1921	473,935	+0.20%
1931	490,052	+0.33%
1941	567,851	+1.48%
1951	654,208	+1.43%
1961	768,157	+1.62%
1971	926,263	+1.89%
1981	1,126,879	+1.98%
1991	1,446,553	+2.53%
2001	1,854,950	+2.52%
2011	2,205,968	+1.75%

According to the 2011 census Mau Nath Bhanjan district has a population of 2,205,968, in which male and female were 1,114,888 and 1,090,782 respectively. In 2001 census, Mau had a population of 1,853,997, in which males were 933,523 and remaining 920,474 were females. roughly equal to the nation of Latvia or the US state of New Mexico. This gives it a ranking of 206th in India (out of a total of 640). The district has a population density of 1,287 inhabitants per square kilometre (3,330/sq mi). Its population growth rate over the decade 2001–2011 was 80.94%. Mau has a sex ratio of 978 females for every 1000 males, and a literacy rate of 75.16%. 22.63% of the population lives in urban areas. Scheduled Castes and Scheduled Tribes made up 21.51% and 1.04% of the population respectively.

Religions in Mau district (2011)
Religion	Percent
Hinduism	80.23%
Islam	19.43%
Other or not stated	0.34%

Mau district has a Hindu-majority population with a significant Muslim minority. Hindus are over 90% in rural areas, while Muslims are majority in urban areas.

Languages in Mau district (2011)
1. Bhojpuri (53.3%)
2. Hindi (33.1%)
3. Urdu (13.5%)
4. Others (0.09%)

At the time of the 2011 Census of India, 53.29% of the population in the district spoke Bhojpuri, 33.11% Hindi and 13.51% Urdu as their first language. Bhojpuri is the native language of the district. The Bhojpuri variant of Kaithi is the indigenous script of Bhojpuri language.

== Notable people ==
- Brigadier Mohammad Usman Masoodi (1912-1948), highest ranking officer of the Indian Army killed in the Indo-Pakistani War of 1947, awarded Maha Vir Chakra (MVC) posthumously.
- Amjad Ali Aazmi (1881-19480) ex Grand Mufti of India
- Habibur Rahman Nomani (21 August 1926 - 17 August 2005); Indian politician from Uttar Pradesh who belonged to the Indian National Congress.
- Kalpnath Rai
- A. K. Sharma, Cabinet Minister in UP government and former IAS.
- Baleshwar Yadav, Bhojpuri Folk singer
- Durga Shanker Mishra, 1984 batch retired IAS served as Chief Secretary to Government of Uttar Pradesh from 30 December 2021 till 30 June 2024.
