= Deaths in January 2009 =

The following is a list of notable deaths in January 2009.

Entries for each day are listed alphabetically by surname. A typical entry lists information in the following sequence:

- Name, age, country of citizenship at birth, subsequent country of citizenship (if applicable), reason for notability, cause of death (if known), and reference.

== January 2009 ==
=== 1 ===
- Todd Bullard, 77, American educator, complications from diabetes.
- Hubert Desbiens, 77, Canadian politician, Quebec MNA (1976–1989).
- Dennis Ford, 77, South African Olympic swimmer.
- Denis Frisoli, 49, American unicyclist.
- Walter Haynes, 80, American steel guitarist.
- Ramashreya Jha, 80, Indian musicologist, complications following heart surgery.
- John Morrow, 77, British Presbyterian minister and peace activist.
- Fahid Mohammed Ally Msalam, 32, Kenyan al-Qaeda leader, allegedly behind Marriott hotel bombings, airstrike.
- Claiborne Pell, 90, American Senator from Rhode Island (1961–1997), creator of the Pell Grant, Parkinson's disease.
- Gert Petersen, 81, Danish journalist and politician.
- Robert Prince, 89, American Major, recipient of the Distinguished Service Cross.
- Edmund Purdom, 84, British actor.
- Nizar Rayan, 49, Palestinian Hamas military and political leader, airstrike.
- Willard Warren Scott Jr., 82, American general, head of United States Military Academy (1981–1986), Parkinson's disease.
- Johannes Mario Simmel, 84, Austrian writer.
- Henry King Stanford, 92, American academic, president of the University of Miami (1962–1981).
- Helen Suzman, 91, South African anti-apartheid activist and politician, MP (1953–1989).
- Sheikh Ahmed Salim Swedan, 48, Kenyan al-Qaeda leader, airstrike.
- Robert Saxton Taylor, 90, American library scholar.

=== 2 ===
- Dnyaneshwar Agashe, 66, Indian cricketer and businessman, heart attack.
- Leonard Andrews, 83, American art patron, prostate cancer.
- Inger Christensen, 73, Danish poet, novelist and essayist.
- John DeFrancis, 97, American sinologist.
- Pavel Deyev, 67, Soviet Olympic equestrian.
- Ralph Gibson, 84, American flying ace of the Korean War.
- Hank DeZonie, 86, American basketball player.
- Steven Gilborn, 72, American actor (Ellen), cancer.
- Valentina Giovagnini, 28, Italian singer, car crash.
- Ian Greaves, 76, British footballer and manager (Mansfield Town, Bolton Wanderers).
- Tony Gregory, 61, Irish politician, member of Dáil Éireann, cancer.
- Joe Henry, 78, American baseball player (Memphis Red Sox, Negro leagues).
- Ryuzo Hiraki, 77, Japanese footballer, pneumonia.
- Albert Horner, 95, Canadian politician, MP for The Battlefords (1958–1968).
- John Olav Larssen, 81, Norwegian evangelical preacher.
- Elisheva Michaeli, 80, Israeli actress (Big Gus, What's the Fuss?), cancer.
- Rashid bin Ahmad Al Mualla II, 78, Emirati ruler of Umm al-Quwain.
- József Sákovics, 81, Hungarian Olympic fencer.
- Nick Scandone, 42, American yachtsman, paralympian gold medallist (2008), Lou Gehrig's disease.
- Cy Thomas, 82, British ice hockey player (Toronto Maple Leafs, Chicago Blackhawks).
- Olgierd Zienkiewicz, 87, British civil engineer.

=== 3 ===
- Kjelfrid Brusveen, 82, Norwegian cross-country skier.
- Charles Camilleri, 77, Maltese composer.
- John Grindrod, 89, Australian Anglican prelate, Archbishop of Brisbane (1980–1989).
- Peter English, 71, Scottish professor of agriculture and author, heart failure.
- Betty Freeman, 87, American philanthropist.
- Pat Hingle, 84, American actor (Batman, Norma Rae, Hang 'Em High), myelodysplasia.
- Li Zuopeng, 94, Chinese general and politician.
- Ulf G. Lindén, 71, Swedish entrepreneur, heart failure.
- Sam McQuagg, 73, American race car driver, NASCAR Rookie of the Year (1965), cancer.
- Hisayasu Nagata, 39, Japanese politician, suicide by jumping.
- Olga San Juan, 81, American actress, kidney failure.
- Matt Sczesny, 76, American scout for the Boston Red Sox, cancer.
- Rosemary Thomson, 73, American politician.
- Sir Alan Walters, 82, British economist.

=== 4 ===
- Lei Clijsters, 52, Belgian footballer and coach, father of Kim Clijsters, lung cancer.
- Sonny Fai, 20, New Zealand rugby league player, drowned.
- Oswaldo Domingues, 91, Brazilian Olympic sprinter.
- K. K. Govind, 92, Indian freedom fighter.
- Gedalio Grinberg, 77, Cuban-born American founder of Movado Group, natural causes.
- Ivan Gubijan, 85, Croatian hammer thrower, Olympic medalist (1948), after long illness.
- India, 18, American pet cat of George W. Bush.
- Gert Jonke, 62, Austrian writer and poet, cancer.
- Arvid Knutsen, 64, Norwegian footballer (Viking FK), brain tumor.
- Jon Latimer, 44, British historian, heart attack.
- Bob Lazarus, 52, American comedian, leukemia.
- Sudhir Ranjan Majumdar, 75, Indian politician, Chief Minister of Tripura (1988–1992), heart attack.
- John McGillicuddy, 78, American CEO of Manufacturers Hanover (1971–1991), Chemical Banking (1991–1993), prostate cancer.
- Vladimir Repyev, 52, Russian Olympic silver medal-winning (1980) handball player.
- Giselle Salandy, 21, Trinidadian boxer, car accident.

=== 5 ===
- Griffin Bell, 90, American judge, Fifth Circuit Appeals Court (1961–1976), U.S. Attorney General (1977–1979), pancreatic cancer.
- Evangelos Depastas, 76, Greek Olympic runner.
- Harry Kinnard, 93, American Army lieutenant general.
- Dale Livingston, 63, American football player (Green Bay Packers), complications from heart surgery.
- Mario Magnotta, 66, Italian Internet celebrity, pulmonary embolism.
- Adolf Merckle, 74, German businessman, suicide by train.
- Stanton Parris, 78, Barbadian cricket umpire, after short illness.
- Roland Piquepaille, 62, French software engineer and technology writer, complications from digestive virus.
- Carl Pohlad, 93, American banker, owner of the Minnesota Twins.
- Jimmy Rayner, 73, English footballer (Peterborough United).
- Verna Mae Slone, 94, American author and quilter, complications from a fall.
- Mircea Stănescu, 39, Romanian politician, MP (2004–2008), apparent suicide by gunshot.
- Ned Tanen, 77, American executive (Universal Pictures), natural causes.
- Sam Taylor, 74, American blues musician, complications from heart disease.

=== 6 ===
- Ron Asheton, 60, American rock guitarist (The Stooges), heart attack (death announced on this date).
- Nino Bongiovanni, 97, American baseball player.
- Brahmkumar Bhatt, 87, Indian politician and Indian independence activist.
- Geoffrey Brooke, 88, British Olympic modern pentathlete.
- Vivian Della Chiesa, 94, American soprano and Broadway theatre performer.
- Robert T. Connor, 90, American politician, Staten Island Borough President (1966–1977).
- Maria Dimitriadi, 58, Greek singer, lung disease.
- John T. Elfvin, 91, American federal judge, justice of the Western District of New York since 1974.
- Alan Geisler, 78, American condiment inventor and food chemist, protein disorder.
- Cheryl Holdridge, 64, American actress (The Mickey Mouse Club), lung cancer.
- John Riley Holt, 90, British physicist.
- Róbert Ilosfalvy, 81, Hungarian opera singer.
- Claude Jeter, 94, American gospel music singer.
- John Scott Martin, 83, British actor (Doctor Who, I, Claudius, Z-Cars), Parkinson's disease.
- Richard Seaver, 82, American owner of Arcade Publishing, heart attack.
- Ghulam Mohammad Shah, 88, Indian politician, Chief Minister of Jammu and Kashmir (1984–1986), after long illness.
- John Street, 77, British snooker referee, pulmonary disease.
- Victor Sumulong, 62, Filipino politician, Congressman (1998–2007), Mayor of Antipolo since 2007, diabetes.
- Charlie Thomson, 78, Scottish footballer (Clyde, Chelsea, Nottingham Forest).

=== 7 ===
- Aimé Adam, 95, Canadian politician.
- Yaakov Banai, 89, Israeli Lehi commander.
- J. D. H. Catleugh, 88, British artist.
- Alfie Conn Sr., 82, Scottish footballer (Hearts, Raith Rovers, Scotland).
- Robert G. Eaton, 71, Canadian politician, cancer.
- Alex van Heerden, 34, South African musician, car accident.
- Jacques Littlefield, 59, American owner of the Military Vehicle Technology Foundation, colon cancer.
- Robert T. Monagan, 88, American politician, Speaker of the California State Assembly (1969–1970), after long illness.
- Puck Oversloot, 94, Dutch swimmer, Olympic silver medallist (1932).
- Anália de Victória Pereira, 67, Angolan politician.
- Ray Dennis Steckler, 70, American film director (Rat Pfink a Boo Boo), cardiac arrest.
- Bob Wilkins, 76, American television personality, horror film host, complications from Alzheimer's disease.

=== 8 ===
- Magdaleno Cano, 75, Mexican Olympic cyclist.
- Alberto Eliani, 86, Italian football player and manager.
- Don Galloway, 71, American actor (Ironside, The Big Chill, Gunfight in Abilene), stroke.
- Björn Haugan, 66, Norwegian operatic lyric tenor.
- Lamya, 45, British singer, heart attack.
- Gaston Lenôtre, 88, French pastry chef.
- Irène Mélikoff, 91, Russian-born French Turkologist.
- Charles Morgan Jr., 78, American lawyer, complications of Alzheimer's disease.
- Richard John Neuhaus, 72, Canadian-born American Roman Catholic priest and theologian, founder of First Things, cancer.
- Zbigniew Podlecki, 68, Polish motorcycle speedway rider.
- Deborah Riedel, 50, Australian soprano, cancer.
- Leonidas Vargas, 60, Colombian drug trafficker, shot.
- Cornelia Wallace, 69, American First Lady of Alabama (1971–1978), second wife of George Wallace, cancer.
- Lasantha Wickrematunge, 50, Sri Lankan journalist, shot.

=== 9 ===
- István Antal, 50, Romanian Olympic ice hockey player, cardiac arrest.
- Dave Dee, 67, British singer (Dave Dee, Dozy, Beaky, Mick & Tich), prostate cancer.
- Harry Endo, 87, American actor (Hawaii Five-O), stroke.
- Rob Gauntlett, 21, British mountaineer, youngest Briton to climb Mount Everest, climbing accident.
- Jon Hager, 67, American country musician and comedian (Hee Haw).
- René Herms, 26, German middle-distance runner.
- Joe Hirsch, 80, American horse racing journalist, Parkinson's disease.
- T. Llew Jones, 93, British Welsh language writer.
- Aleksandr Kosopkin, 51, Russian statesman, Plenipotentiary Representative in the State Duma (since 2009), helicopter crash.
- Peter Lane, Baron Lane of Horsell, 83, British businessman and politician.
- Pál Németh, 71, Hungarian hammer throw coach, heart failure.
- Kaarle Ojanen, 90, Finnish chess player.
- Dave Roberts, 64, American baseball pitcher (Houston Astros, San Diego Padres, Detroit Tigers), lung cancer.
- Jean Sassi, 91, French army colonel.
- Jack F. Shaw, 70, American cross country running coach.
- David Smiley, 92, British SOE officer.
- Ljubica Sokić, 94, Serbian painter.
- Tom Van Flandern, 68, American astronomer, colon cancer.
- Sir Neil Wheeler, 91, British Air Chief Marshal.
- Frank Williams, 50, American baseball player (San Francisco Giants, Cincinnati Reds, Detroit Tigers), heart attack.

=== 10 ===
- Georges Cravenne, 94, French publicity agent, founder of the César Award.
- Isabelle of Salm-Salm, 105, German royal.
- Peter Kollock, 49, American sociologist, motorcycle accident.
- Pio Laghi, 86, Italian Cardinal for San Pietro in Vincoli, Vatican Ambassador to the US (1980–1990), hematologic disease.
- Liliana Lozano, 30, Colombian actress and beauty queen, shot.
- Gil Mains, 79, American football player.
- Jean Pelletier, 73, Canadian politician, Mayor of Quebec City (1977–1989), Chief of Staff (1993–2001), complications of colon cancer.
- Eluned Phillips, 94, British writer, crowned bard at the National Eisteddfod of Wales (1967, 1983), pneumonia.
- Colin Phipps, 74, British petroleum geologist and MP (1974–1979).
- Ivor Spencer, 84, British toastmaster.
- Bill Stone, 108, British World War I veteran.
- Coosje van Bruggen, 66, Dutch-born American sculptor, wife of Claes Oldenburg, breast cancer.
- Jack Wheeler, 89, British footballer.
- Sidney Wood, 97, American tennis player, Hall of Fame (1964), third-youngest winner of Wimbledon (1931).
- Ray Yoshida, 78, American painter, cancer.
- Elżbieta Zawacka, 99, Polish World War II freedom fighter.

=== 11 ===
- Maurice L. Albertson, 91, American Peace Corps architect, founder of Village Earth.
- Quirino De Ascaniis, 100, Italian priest.
- Anabel Bosch, 32, Filipino singer, cerebral aneurysm.
- Andy DeMize, 25, American drummer (Nekromantix), car accident.
- Shigeo Fukuda, 76, Japanese sculptor and graphic artist, subarachnoid hemorrhage.
- Jack Gifford, 68, American businessman (Maxim Integrated Products), heart attack.
- Epeli Hauʻofa, 70, Fijian writer and anthropologist, after short illness.
- Bert Hazell, 101, British politician and trade unionist, MP (1964–1970), oldest modern MP.
- Bob Kilby, 64, British motorcycle speedway rider, cancer.
- Li Sizhong, 87, Chinese ichthyologist.
- Pat Lindsey, 72, American politician, member of the Alabama Senate (1967–1974, since 1982), heart attack.
- Freddie Mack, 74, British boxer and musician.
- Ricardo Martínez de Hoyos, 90, Mexican painter, pneumonia.
- François de Noailles, 103, French noble.
- Tom O'Horgan, 84, American theater director (Hair, Jesus Christ Superstar), complications of Alzheimer's disease.
- Wally Olds, 59, American Olympic ice hockey silver medal-winning player (1972), colon cancer.
- Frederic M. Richards, 83, American biochemist, natural causes.
- Vivian Ridler, 95, British printer.
- Lorene Rogers, 94, American educator, President of the University of Texas at Austin (1974–1979).
- Milan Rúfus, 80, Slovak poet and academic.
- Daryl Seaman, 86, Canadian businessman, co-owner of the Calgary Flames.
- Jon Tvedt, 42, Norwegian orienteer and mountain runner, fall.
- Victor Vacquier, 101, American geophysicist, pneumonia.
- David Vine, 74, British sports presenter, heart attack.
- Olle Wänlund, 85, Swedish Olympic cyclist.

=== 12 ===
- Claude Berri, 74, French film director (Jean de Florette, Manon des Sources), Academy Award winner, stroke.
- Russ Craft, 89, American football player (Philadelphia Eagles, Pittsburgh Steelers).
- Friaça, 84, Brazilian footballer, multiple organ failure.
- Walter Harris, 77, Canadian artist.
- Mick Imlah, 52, British poet, motor neurone disease.
- David Kerr, 86, British politician, MP for Wandsworth Central (1964–1970).
- Jack Erik Kjuus, 81, Norwegian politician.
- Alan Lew, 65, American rabbi.
- Arne Næss, 96, Norwegian philosopher, founder of deep ecology.
- Michael Russell, 88, Irish Roman Catholic prelate, Bishop of Waterford and Lismore.
- Alejandro Sokol, 48, Argentine rock and roll musician, cardio-respiratory failure.
- Allen Zwerdling, 86, American theatre director and actor.

=== 13 ===
- Ayman Alkurd, 28, Palestinian footballer, airstrike.
- Pedro Aguilar, 81, American dancer, heart failure.
- Hortense Calisher, 97, American author.
- Tommy Casey, 78, British footballer.
- Cousin Junior, 48, American professional wrestler, heart attack.
- Mikhail Donskoy, 61, Russian programmer, co-developer of the first world computer chess champion (Kaissa).
- John Edmondson, 2nd Baron Sandford, 88, British naval officer, politician, and Anglican priest.
- Mary Ejercito, 103, Filipino mother of Joseph Estrada, heart seizure and stomach aneurysm.
- Preston Gómez, 85, Cuban-born American baseball player, coach and manager (San Diego Padres).
- Umar Israilov, 27, Russian critic of Chechen President Ramzan Kadyrov, shot.
- Jean Keene, 85, American bird feeder, natural causes.
- Gary Kurfirst, 61, American music manager.
- Sir Dai Llewellyn, 62, British socialite, bone cancer.
- Patrick McGoohan, 80, American-born Irish actor (The Prisoner, Braveheart, Escape from Alcatraz), after short illness.
- Elizabeth Paterson-Brown, 87, Scottish curler.
- James B. Pearson, 88, American politician, U.S. Senator from Kansas (1962–1978).
- Mansour Rahbani, 83, Lebanese composer and musician, pneumonia.
- Nicholas Andrew Rey, 70, Polish-born American diplomat, Ambassador to Poland (1993–1997), lung cancer.
- W. D. Snodgrass, 83, American poet, lung cancer.
- Folke Sundquist, 83, Swedish actor.
- Richard Tyler, 92, British architect.
- Eben van Zijl, 77, Namibian politician.
- Nancy Bird Walton, 93, Australian aviator, natural causes.
- Peter Ward, 95, British Olympic athlete.

=== 14 ===
- Trammell Crow, 94, American real estate developer.
- Mike Derrick, 65, American baseball player (Boston Red Sox).
- Dušan Džamonja, 80, Croatian sculptor, heart failure.
- Peter E. Fleming Jr., 79, American criminal defense lawyer, complications from lung surgery.
- Jan Kaplický, 71, Czech-born British architect.
- The Mighty Duke, 77, Trinidadian calypsonian, myelofibrosis.
- Ricardo Montalbán, 88, Mexican-born American actor (Fantasy Island, Star Trek II: The Wrath of Khan, The Naked Gun), Emmy winner (1978), heart failure.
- Angela Morley, 84, British composer and conductor.
- Aron Moscona, 87, Israeli-born American biologist, heart failure.
- Leo Rwabwogo, 59, Ugandan boxer, Olympic medallist (1968, 1972).
- Gennadiy Shatkov, 76, Russian Soviet-era boxer, Olympic gold medalist (1956).

=== 15 ===
- Abdirahman Ahmed, Somali politician, shot.
- Boris Apostolov, 83, Bulgarian Olympic footballer.
- Ovini Bokini, 64, Fijian chief and politician.
- Maurice Chappaz, 92, Swiss author and poet.
- Olivier Clément, 87, French Eastern Orthodox theologian.
- William Close, 84, American physician, helped stem 2007 Congo ebola epidemic, father of Glenn Close, heart attack.
- Veronika Dudarova, 92, Russian symphony conductor.
- Tommy Jones, 54, American baseball player, manager and coach, brain cancer.
- Tommy Muñiz, 86, Puerto Rican television producer and comedian, after long illness.
- Said Seyam, 50, Palestinian government official, Interior Minister (2006–2007), airstrike.
- Tapan Sinha, 84, Indian film director, bronchopneumonia.
- Craig Stimac, 54, American baseball player (San Diego Padres), suicide by gunshot.
- Lillian Willoughby, 93, American Quaker activist, founder of Take Back the Night.

=== 16 ===
- Aad Bak, 82, Dutch football player.
- Sidney Brichto, 72, American-born British Liberal rabbi.
- Jim Carvin, 79, American political strategist, heart failure.
- Joe Erskine, 78, American boxer and ultramarathon runner.
- Judith Hoffberg, 74, American art librarian and archivist, lymphoma.
- Claudio Milar, 34, Uruguayan footballer, bus crash.
- Gordon Whitey Mitchell, 76, American jazz musician and comedy writer (Get Smart, All in the Family, The Jeffersons), cancer.
- Sir John Mortimer, 85, British barrister, novelist and dramatist (Rumpole of the Bailey), after long illness.
- Robert Palmer, 74, American vintner, blood infection.
- Bogdan Tirnanić, 67, Serbian journalist.
- Joop Wille, 88, Dutch footballer (EDO and The Netherlands).
- Andrew Wyeth, 91, American painter (Christina's World), after short illness.

=== 17 ===
- Tomislav Crnković, 79, Croatian footballer.
- Susanna Foster, 84, American actress and singer (Phantom of the Opera).
- Gary Hill, 67, American basketball player.
- Fiza Ibn-e-Faizi, 86, Urdu and Persian poet, prolonged illness.
- Anders Isaksson, 65, Swedish writer, reporter and historian.
- Mary Lundby, 60, American politician, member of the Iowa Senate since 1995, cervical cancer.
- Malcolm MacPherson, 65, American journalist, heart attack.
- Paul Nicholls, 62, Australian first-class cricketer, cancer.
- Marjorie Parker Smith, 92, American figure skater.
- Mike Parkinson, 60, New Zealand rugby union player.
- Edmund Leopold de Rothschild, 93, British financier and horticulturist.
- Arthur Weisberg, 77, American bassoonist, pancreatic cancer.
- Kamil Zvelebil, 80, Czech scholar of Indian literature and linguistics, cancer.

=== 18 ===
- Max Borges Jr., 90, Cuban architect.
- Kathleen Byron, 88, British actress (Black Narcissus, The Elephant Man, Saving Private Ryan).
- Holly Coors, 88, American conservative political activist and philanthropist, after long illness.
- Tony Hart, 83, British artist and television presenter.
- Marta Ingarden, 87, Polish and Ukrainian architect.
- Nora Kovach, 77, Hungarian-born American ballerina, after short illness.
- Bob May, 69, American actor (Lost in Space), heart failure.
- Zenonas Petrauskas, 58, Lithuanian lawyer and politician.
- Bal Samant, 84, Indian writer, after long illness.
- Seymour Schwartzman, 78, American cantor and operatic baritone.
- James E. Swett, 88, American fighter pilot, Medal of Honor recipient, after long illness.
- Grigore Vieru, 73, Moldovan poet, car accident.

=== 19 ===
- Anastasia Baburova, 25, Russian journalist, shot.
- E. Balanandan, 84, Indian politician and trade unionist, lung cancer.
- Hugh Lindsay, 81, British Roman Catholic prelate, Bishop of Hexham and Newcastle.
- Stanislav Markelov, 34, Russian civil rights lawyer, shot.
- Dennis Page, 89, British Anglican prelate, Bishop of Lancaster (1975–1985).
- Viking Palm, 85, Swedish Olympic gold medal-winning (1952) wrestler.
- Raymond Parker, 89, British sprint canoer.
- Luigi Preti, 94, Italian politician, natural causes.
- José Torres, 72, Puerto Rican boxer, Olympic silver medallist (1956), heart attack.

=== 20 ===
- Chris Chianelli, 58, American hobbyist, writer and television host, natural causes.
- Constance E. Cook, 89, American politician, member of the New York State Assembly (1963–1974).
- Austin Denney, 65, American football player (Chicago Bears, Buffalo Bills).
- Johnny Dixon, 85, British footballer (Aston Villa), complications from Alzheimer's disease.
- David S. Dodge, 86, American President of American University of Beirut (1996–1997), cancer.
- Joe Domnanovich, 89, American football player.
- Cornell N. Dypski, 77, American legislator.
- Mark Fernando, 67, Sri Lankan judge, member of the Supreme Court of Sri Lanka, cancer.
- Mickey Gee, 64, British rock and roll guitarist, emphysema.
- Stéphanos II Ghattas, 89, Egyptian Coptic Catholic prelate, Patriarch of Alexandria (1986–2006).
- Stan Hagen, 68, Canadian politician, member of the Legislative Assembly of British Columbia (1986–1991, since 2001), heart attack.
- Bhogendra Jha, 85, Indian politician.
- Dante Lavelli, 85, American football player (Cleveland Browns), Hall of Famer (1975), heart failure.
- David "Fathead" Newman, 75, American jazz saxophonist (Fathead), pancreatic cancer.
- Dina Vierny, 89, Russian-born French model.
- Sheila Walsh, 80, British romantic novelist.
- Leonard Albert Wiseman, 93, British chemist and scientific administrator.

=== 21 ===
- Irina Belotelkin, 96, Russian-born American couturier.
- Ernie Bourne, 82, Australian actor.
- Pat Crawford, 75, Australian Test cricketer, after long illness.
- Vic Crowe, 76, British footballer (Aston Villa, Peterborough) and manager (Aston Villa, Portland Timbers), after long illness.
- Shane Dronett, 38, American football player (Atlanta Falcons), suicide by gunshot.
- Astrid Folstad, 76, Norwegian actress.
- Jean Jadot, 99, Belgian prelate and diplomat, Vatican Ambassador to the US (1974–1980), after long illness.
- Leonard Kemp, 99, Australian cricketer.
- Lajos Kiss, 68, Hungarian rower.
- Finn Kobberø, 73, Danish badminton player.
- Horace R. Kornegay, 84, American politician, member of the U.S. House of Representatives from North Carolina (1961–1969).
- Krista Kilvet, 62, Estonian journalist, politician and diplomat.
- Sally Ledger, 47, English literary scholar.
- Kunal Mitra, 44, Indian actor, heart attack.
- Peter Persidis, 61, Austrian footballer, cancer.
- Veatrice Rice, 59, American television personality (Jimmy Kimmel Live!), cancer.
- Daphne Rooke, 94, South African author.
- Charles H. Schneer, 88, American film producer (Jason and the Argonauts), Alzheimer's disease.

=== 22 ===
- Panapasa Balekana, 79, Fijian-born Solomon Island co-writer of the Solomon Islands national anthem.
- John Alan Beesley, 81, Canadian diplomat.
- Chau Sen Cocsal Chhum, 103, Cambodian politician, Prime Minister (1962).
- Bob Doyle, 93, Irish activist, last surviving Irish member of the International Brigade in the Spanish Civil War.
- Bill Herchman, 75, American football player.
- Sveinn Ingvarsson, 94, Icelandic Olympic sprinter.
- Pentti Kouri, 59, Finnish economist and investor, after long illness.
- Liang Yusheng, 85, Chinese novelist, natural causes.
- Reginald Perkins, 53, American serial killer, execution by lethal injection.
- Clément Pinault, 23, French footballer, heart attack.
- Darrell Sandeen, 73, American actor (L.A. Confidential), stroke.
- Louis-Paul-Armand Simonneaux, 93, French Bishop of Versailles.
- Billy Werber, 100, American baseball player, last living teammate of Babe Ruth, oldest living Major League Baseball player, natural causes.
- Mbongeleni Zondi, 39, South African Zulu chief, shot.

=== 23 ===
- Ilija Arnautović, 84, Yugoslavian architect.
- Sir Richard Beaumont, 96, British diplomat.
- H. J. Blackham, 105, British humanist and writer.
- Martin Delaney, 63, American HIV activist, complications from liver cancer.
- Helen Maksagak, 77, Canadian politician, first Inuk Northwest Territories Commissioner (1995–1999) and Nunavut (1999–2000).
- Sybil Moses, 69, American judge (New Jersey Superior Court) and lawyer, breast cancer.
- George Perle, 93, American composer, after long illness.
- Anna Radziwiłł, 69, Polish historian and politician.
- Robert W. Scott, 79, American politician, Governor of North Carolina (1969–1973), natural causes.
- Percy Smith, 86, Canadian politician, MP for Northumberland—Miramichi (1968–1974).
- Thomas, 61, American activist, pulmonary disease.
- Compton Vyfhuis, 76, Guyanese West Indian cricket umpire.

=== 24 ===
- Susan Baird, 68, Scottish politician, Lord Provost of Glasgow (1988–1992).
- Gérard Blanc, 61, French singer and guitarist, cerebral hemorrhage.
- Fernando Cornejo, 39, Chilean footballer, stomach cancer.
- Mariana Bridi Costa, 20, Brazilian model, complications from necrotic sepsis.
- Olivia Irvine Dodge, 90, American philanthropist.
- Leonard Gaskin, 88, American jazz bassist.
- Marie Glory, 103, French actress.
- Reg Gutteridge, 84, British boxing commentator and journalist, stroke.
- Diane Holland, 78, British actress (Hi-de-Hi!), bronchial pneumonia.
- Karl Koller, 79, Austrian footballer, Alzheimer's disease.
- Len Perme, 91, American baseball player.
- Olga Raggio, 82, Italian-born American art scholar and curator, cancer.
- John Buchan Ross, 96, British Royal Air Force officer.
- William Smith, 69, American theologian.
- Thomas Ambrose Tschoepe, 93, American Bishop of Dallas.
- Kay Yow, 66, American women's basketball coach (NC State), breast cancer.
- Bernard C. Webber, 80, United States Coast Guardsman, heart attack.

=== 25 ===
- Mamadou Dia, 98, Senegalese politician, Prime Minister (1957–1962).
- León Klenicki, 78, American rabbi, colorectal cancer.
- Ewald Kooiman, 70, Dutch organist, cardiac arrest.
- Ed Lyons, 85, American baseball player (Washington Senators).
- Kim Manners, 58, American television producer and director (The X-Files, Supernatural, 21 Jump Street), lung cancer.
- John Murray, 93, Australian politician, MP (1958–1961).
- Hiroshi Oguchi, 58, Japanese artist and musician.
- Antonio Pagán, 50, American politician, New York City Councilman (1992–1998), Commissioner of Employment (1998–2002).
- Marguerite, Baroness de Reuter, 96, British aristocrat, last heir of the Reuters family, granddaughter-in-law of Paul Reuter.

=== 26 ===
- Mamman Bello Ali, 50, Nigerian politician, Senator (1999–2007), Governor of Yobe State since 2007, leukemia.
- Fernando Amaral, 84, Portuguese politician, President of the Assembly of the Republic (1984–1987).
- James Brady, 80, American columnist (Parade, New York Post).
- Ahmad Hasan Dani, 88, Pakistani archaeologist.
- John Isaacs, 93, American basketball player (New York Renaissance), stroke.
- Ivan Jensen, 86, Danish footballer.
- Roy Johnson, 49, American baseball player, heart attack.
- Zakan Jugelia, Abkhaz politician, shot.
- Lucijan Kleva, 66, Slovenian rower.
- Don Ladner, 60, New Zealand rugby league player, heart attack.
- Sir Donald Luddington, 88, British High Commissioner for Western Pacific (1973–1976), Hong Kong ICAC Commissioner (1978–1980).
- Gerry Merito, 70, New Zealand singer and guitarist.
- Avraham Ravitz, 75, Israeli politician, member of the Knesset (1988–2009), heart failure.
- David Sabiston, 84, American physician, pioneer of heart surgery, stroke.
- Alan Scott, 72, Australian oven manufacturer, heart failure.

=== 27 ===
- Connie Buckley, 93, Irish hurler.
- Christian Enzensberger, 77, German anglicist, author and translator.
- Koji Kakizawa, 75, Japanese politician, Minister for Foreign Affairs (1994), esophageal cancer.
- Blair Lent, 79, American author and illustrator (Tikki Tikki Tembo), pneumonia.
- Michael Majerus, 54, British geneticist.
- Aubrey Powell, 90, British footballer.
- Mino Reitano, 64, Italian singer, after long illness.
- Sharat Sardana, 40, British screenwriter (Goodness Gracious Me), streptococcal infection.
- John Updike, 76, American author (Rabbit Is Rich, The Witches of Eastwick), lung cancer.
- Ramaswamy Venkataraman, 98, Indian politician, President (1987–1992), multiple organ failure.
- Billy Wilson, 81, American football player (San Francisco 49ers), cancer.

=== 28 ===
- Robert S. Barton, 83, American computer engineer.
- E. A. Chowdhury, 80, Bangladeshi police official.
- Gene Corbett, 95, American baseball player (Philadelphia Phillies).
- Glenn Davis, 74, American Olympic gold medal hurdler, after long illness.
- John Patrick Diggins, 73, American historian, colorectal cancer.
- Fang Chengguo, 65, Chinese banker.
- Lucille M. Mair, 84, Jamaican diplomat.
- Vasilij Melik, 88, Slovenian historian.
- Gyula Pálóczi, 46, Hungarian athlete, heart disease.
- Billy Powell, 56, American musician (Lynyrd Skynyrd), heart attack.
- Mira Rostova, 99, Russian-born American acting coach.
- Peter Serry, 35, Kenyan football player, coach and administrator, fire.
- Robert L. Stone, 87, American CEO of The Hertz Corporation, heart failure.
- Angel Wainaina, 25, Kenyan actress, fire.
- Wendell Wyatt, 91, American politician, member of the United States House of Representatives for Oregon (1964–1975).

=== 29 ===
- A. M. B. H. G. Abeyrathnebanda, 19, Sri Lankan soldier, explosion.
- Pawlu Aquilina, 79, Maltese poet and writer.
- René Berger, 93, Swiss writer, philosopher and art historian.
- Juan Brotto, 69, Argentine Olympic cyclist.
- Geraldine Bureker, 84, American baseball player (AAGPBL)
- Charles Clews, 89, Maltese comedian.
- Hank Crawford, 74, American jazz, rhythm and blues saxophonist, complications from a stroke.
- John Harry Dunning, 81, British economist.
- Bill Frindall, 69, British cricket statistician, Legionnaire's disease.
- Karl Gass, 91, German documentary filmmaker, natural causes.
- Hélio Gracie, 95, Brazilian martial artist, creator of Brazilian Jiu-Jitsu.
- George Holmes, 81, British historian.
- John Martyn, 60, British singer and songwriter, pneumonia.
- Roger Pontet, 88, French cyclist.
- Roy Saunders, 78, British footballer (Liverpool, Swansea City).
- Charles H. Smelser, 88, American politician, Maryland Delegate (1955–1963) and State Senator (1967–1995).
- Roy Somlyo, 83, American theatre producer, cancer.
- François Villiers, 88, French film director.

=== 30 ===
- José de Almeida Batista Pereira, 91, Brazilian Bishop of Guaxupé (1964–1976).
- João do Amaral Gurgel, 82, Brazilian engineer and businessman, Alzheimer's disease.
- Hans Beck, 79, German inventor, creator of Playmobil toys.
- Mike Francis, 47, Italian pop musician, lung cancer.
- John Gordy, 73, American football player (Detroit Lions), pancreatic cancer.
- H. Guy Hunt, 75, American politician, Governor of Alabama (1987–1993), lung cancer.
- Safar Iranpak, 61, Iranian footballer, lung cancer.
- Ingemar Johansson, 76, Swedish world heavyweight boxing champion (1959–1960), complications from pneumonia.
- Sune Jonsson, 78, Swedish photographer and writer.
- Gérard Lecointe, 96, French general.
- Teddy Mayer, 73, American motor racing entrepreneur.
- Milton Parker, 90, American businessman, owner of the Carnegie Deli, respiratory problems.
- James Schevill, 88, American poet and playwright, stroke.
- Stephen Zetterberg, 92, American attorney and politician.
- Neiliezhü Üsou, 67, Indian influential Baptist preacher and public leader from the North-Eastern state of India, Nagaland.

=== 31 ===
- Lino Aldani, 82, Italian science fiction writer, lung disease.
- Sir John Fuller, 91, Australian politician and monarchist, member of New South Wales Legislative Council (1961–1978), cancer.
- Harry Hill, 92, British bronze medal-winning Olympic cyclist (1936), pneumonia.
- Thérèse Lavoie-Roux, 80, Canadian politician, after long illness.
- Francis Lévy, 78, French rugby player.
- Eddie Logan, 98, American Negro league baseball player, stroke.
- Dewey Martin, 68, Canadian-born American drummer (Buffalo Springfield).
- Nagesh, 75, Indian film comedian, after short illness.
- Des Newton, 67, British craftsman, maker of model ships in bottles.
- Clint Ritchie, 70, American actor (One Life to Live), blood clot after heart surgery.
- Daniel Seligman, 84, American columnist (Fortune), multiple myeloma.
- Erland von Koch, 98, Swedish composer.
- Joanna Wiszniewicz, 61, Polish historian.
