= Moscona =

Moscona is a surname. Notable people with the surname include:

- Anne Moscona, American pediatrician and virologist, daughter of Aron
- Aron Moscona (1921–2009), Israeli-born American developmental biologist, father of Anne
- Myriam Moscona (born 1955), Mexican writer
- Nicola Moscona (1907–1975), Greek operatic bass

Moscona may also refer to:

- Moscona (horse), a Chilean racehorse
