= Megatech =

Megatech may refer to:

- Megatech (Indonesian company), a supercar developer
- Megatech International, an American maker of radio-controlled toys
- Megatech Software, an American licensor of anime games and eroge
- MegaTech, a British video-game magazine
- Sega Mega-Tech, a Sega arcade system board
