= Robert Palmer (disambiguation) =

Robert Allen Palmer (1949–2003) was an English singer-songwriter and musician.

Robert Palmer may also refer to:

== Academics ==
- Robert Roswell Palmer (1909–2002), historian of France
- R. E. A. Palmer (1933–2006), classical scholar and ancient historian

== Businessmen ==
- Robert Palmer (computer businessman) (born 1940), CEO of Digital Equipment Corporation
- Robert W. Palmer, land appraiser for Madison Guaranty; pleaded guilty in Whitewater controversy
- Robert Palmer (vintner) (1934–2009), American advertising executive and vintner

== Politicians ==
- Robert Palmer (MP) (1793–1872), English Conservative member of parliament
- Robert Moffett Palmer (1820–1862), American diplomat and politician
- Robert Palmer, 1st Baron Rusholme (1890–1977), general secretary of the British Co-operative Union and member of the House of Lords
- Robert John Palmer (1849–1928), tailor and politician in South Carolina

== Sportsmen ==
- Robert Palmer (skier) (born 1947), New Zealand Olympic skier
- Robert Palmer (cricketer) (born 1960), Hong Kong-born former English cricketer

== Other people ==
- Robert Palmer, pseudonym of Cyriel Buysse (1859–1932), Flemish author
- Robert Palmer (American writer) (1945–1997), American music critic and blues producer
- Robert Palmer (British writer) (1888–1916), British writer, poet and British Army captain
- Robert Moffat Palmer (1915–2010), American composer
- Robert Palmer (RAF officer) (1920–1944), British bomber pilot and recipient of the Victoria Cross

== See also ==
- Rob Palmer (disambiguation)
