= Geoffrey Brooke =

Geoffrey Brook(e) may refer to:

- Geoffrey Brooke (pentathlete) (1920–2009), British modern pentathlete
- Geoffrey Brooke (equestrian) (1884–1966), British equestrian
- Geoffrey Brooke, character in 12.10 (film)
- Geoffrey Brook, musician in The Brook Brothers

== See also ==
- Geoffrey Brooke-Taylor (1895–1968), English cricketer
