= Des Newton =

Des Newton may refer to:

- Des Newton (model maker) (1942–2009), British maker of model ships in bottles
- Des Newton (Gaelic footballer), former Gaelic footballer and manager from County Roscommon, Ireland
