= Liliana Lozano =

Colombian actress (1978–2009)

- Promotional photo of Liliana Lozano
- Born: Liliana Andrea Lozano Garzón; September 28, 1978; El Paujil, Caquetá
- Died: January 10, 2009 (aged 30); Pradera
- Cause of death: Gunshot wound
- Occupations: Actress, beauty queen
- Years active: 1995–2008

Liliana Andrea Lozano Garzón (September 28, 1978 – January 10, 2009) was a Colombian actress and beauty queen, and was the girlfriend of Fabio Vargas, brother of drug lord Leonidas Vargas. Lozano won a national beauty contest at the Carnival in Colombia in 1995. She started her television career as a game show presenter, and eventually acted on such shows as Pasión de Gavilanes and La Dama de Troya. On January 10, 2009, Lozano was found dead in Pradera along with Fabio Vargas, the brother of Leonidas Vargas. Both were tortured and shot to death, which authorities said could have been retaliation from drug dealers.

== Biography ==
Liliana Lozano was born in Paujil Caqueta, to Luis Carlos Lozano and Dora Garzón. In 1994, Lozano won the Queen of Bambuco beauty contest in Caquetá, and won the national beauty queen title at the annual Carnival in Colombia in 1995. Also that year, Lozano began her television career, working as a game show presenter. She also briefly appeared in the soap opera Pasión de Gavilanes (Passion of the Sparrowhawks), one of the most successful Colombian soap operas, which was seen in more than 40 countries. Lozano played a nurse on the show.

Lozano also appeared on the shows La familia Cheveroni, Infieles anónimos, Así es la vida, Amor de mis amores and Marido a Sueldo. Her final acting appearance was in 2008 on La Dama de Troya (The Woman from Troy) as Carmentea, a character who, like Lozano herself, won the Bambuco beauty queen contest. Lozano had a romantic relationship with Pablo Martin, a Venezuelan actor who starred in the soap opera Dora, la celadora (Dora the Keeper). Lozano was also said to have been romantically involved with the former football player Faustino Asprilla, which neither of the two confirmed or denied. Some time prior to 2009, Lozano underwent facelift surgery.

=== Death ===
Relatives said since about 2006, Lozano had been involved in a romantic relationship with Fabio Vargas, the brother of Leonidas Vargas, a Colombian drug lord who led a multi-million dollar cocaine empire. On January 8, 2009, Vargas was shot to death in a hospital room by what authorities believed were two professional hitmen. On January 10, Lozano was shot to death along with Fabio Vargas. The bodies of Lozano and Fabio Vargas were found in a ditch outside a hotel in Pradera, a town in the Colombian department of Valle del Cauca, near Cali. Police believed the two were staying in the hotel, where they were tortured and murdered. Both bodies were found half-naked, with their hands and feet bound and plastic taped over their heads. Authorities believed the two killings could have been retaliation from drug dealers, and the fact that they so closely followed the murder of Leonidas Vargas could have been a sign of a bloody war waged to take control of Vargas' cocaine business. Valle del Cauca authorities offered a 50 million pesos reward to anyone who could provide information leading to the capture of the killers of Lozano and Fabio Vargas. Lozano spent the days before her death celebrating New Year's Day with her family in Neiva.
