= Cristina Umaña =

Colombian actress

- Cristina Umaña in 2026
- Born: Cristina Umaña Rojas; December 24, 1974 (age 51); Ibagué, Colombia
- Occupation: Actress
- Years active: 1996–present

Cristina Umaña (born December 24, 1974) is a Colombian actress.

She studied drama from 1993 to 1995 in the Centro de Educación Artística of Televisa. In Colombia she had the leading role of telenovelas, Yo amo a Paquita Gallego and La mujer del presidente. She is best known for playing the role of Judy Moncada in the Netflix series Narcos, and Gloria Bonalde in the Amazon series Jack Ryan (2019) .

== Filmography ==
=== Film ===
- Lecciones para un Beso, 2011
- Dios los Junta y Ellos se Separan, 2006
- El Rey, 2004
- El Capo 2, 2010
- ¿Quién Paga el Pato?, 2000
- Mira Quien te Mira, 1999
- Malamor, 1999

=== Television ===
- The Night Manager, (S2) 2026, Consuelo Arbenz
- Jack Ryan, 2019, Gloria Bonalde
- Wild District Daniela Leon, 2018
- Narcos, 2015, Judy Moncada
- Mujeres Asesinas, 2008
- La Dama de Troya, 2008
- Capadocia, 2008
- Tiempo Final, 2007
- Vuelo 1503, 2005
- Todos Quieren con Marilyn, 2004
- Punto de Giro, 2003
- Siete Veces Amada, 2002
- Traga Maluca, 2000
- Amores Como el Nuestro, 1998
- La Mujer del Presidente, 1997
- Yo amo a Paquita Gallego, 1997
- Cartas a Harrison, 1996
- Mascarada, 1996
- Oro, 1996
- El Capo, 2009
- El Rey de los Cielos, 2011

== Awards ==
- Premios TvyNovelas - Best Antagonistic Actress, 2005
- Premios TvyNovelas - Best Actress, 1999
- Premios TvyNovelas - Best Actress in a Supporting role, 1999
- Festival Internacional de Cine de Cartagena, 1998
- Premios Shocks- Best NewActress, 1998
