= Ludowy Theatre =

Theatre in Kraków, Poland

- Teatr Ludowy
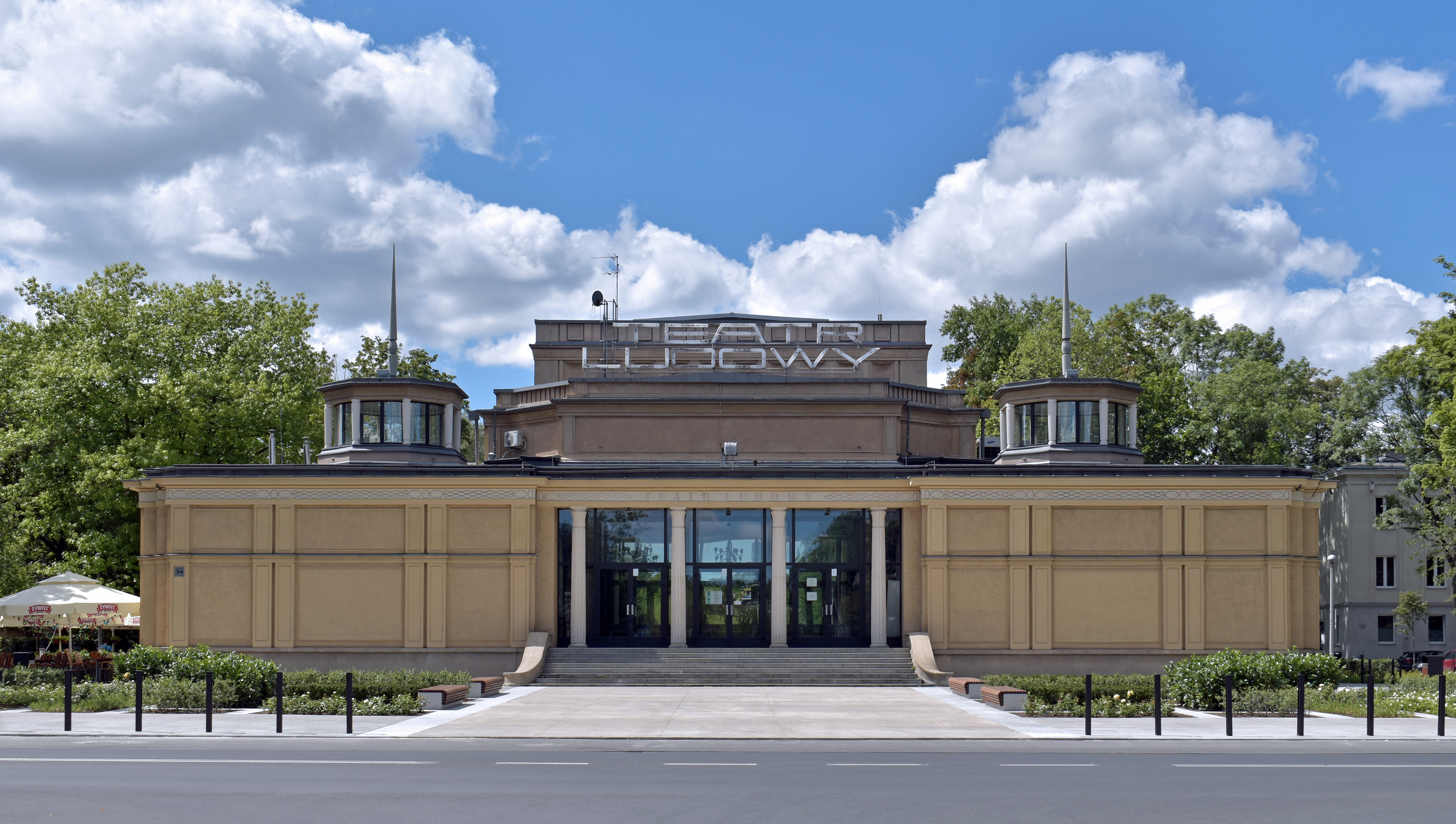
- Interactive map of Ludowy Theatre
- Address: 34 osiedle Teatralne; Kraków; Poland
- Coordinates: 50°04′49.3″N 20°02′01.5″E

Construction
- Opened: December 3, 1955; 70 years ago
- Years active: 1955–present
- Architects: Janusz Ingarden; Marta Ingarden; Jan Dąbrowski

Website
- ludowy.pl

Historic Monument of Poland
- Designated: 2023-01-30
- Part of: Kraków - the architectural and urban complex of the Nowa Huta district
- Reference no.: Dz. U. z 2023 r. poz. 222

The Ludowy Theatre (literally: People's Theatre, Polish: Teatr Ludowy) a historic theater located in the 34 Teatralne Estate in Nowa Huta, the former district of Kraków, Poland.

Opened on 3 December 1955. At that time in the Polish People's Republic, the official policy of socialist realism in art and social life came to an end and de-Stalinization was taking place, heading for its culmination in the events of Polish October. The Ludowy quickly became known as the city's prime avant-garde stage thanks to collaboration of eminent artists, including the theatre theoretician and painter Józef Szajna, Tadeusz Kantor (both from the Academy of Fine Arts), Lidia Zamkow, Krystyna Zachwatowicz, and others.

== History ==
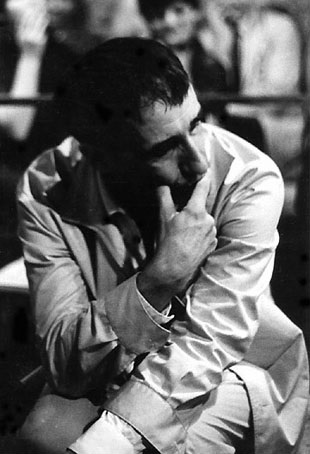
Tadeusz Kantor

Teatr Ludowy, designed by architects Edmund Dąbrowski and Janusz Ingarden, was built in 1954–1955, with the cubic volume of 14,000 m³ and seating for 420. It was placed in the centre of a socialist housing urban project for social and ideological reasons, to spread high culture among the working class population established during the past few years in the surrounding Nowa Huta industrial district and as a possible vehicle for workers' indoctrination. However, thanks to the revolutionary vision of its first president, Krystyna Skuszanka, Teatr Ludowy became one of the most interesting theatres in the country, with Jerzy Krasowski as its first resident director and painter Józef Szajna as its visionary set designer. Together, they turned the young local venue into an innovative and politically engaging stage with serious intellectual and artistic ambitions. Szajna, a survivor of Nazi camps in Auschwitz and Buchenwald, was the theatre's artistic director in 1963-1966. In his popular productions of Shakespeare and Greek tragedies, he evoked his own camp experiences; it was called a theater of death by Peter Brook.

The name Teatr Ludowy ('The People's Theatre') had a unique tradition in Kraków, in spite of its ostensibly state socialist, leftist or populist connotations. In 1902 (during the Partitions of Poland), another Ludowy Theatre was opened in Kraków by the renowned actor Stefan Jaracz, who performed there. It was situated at Krowoderska Street.

== Repertoire ==
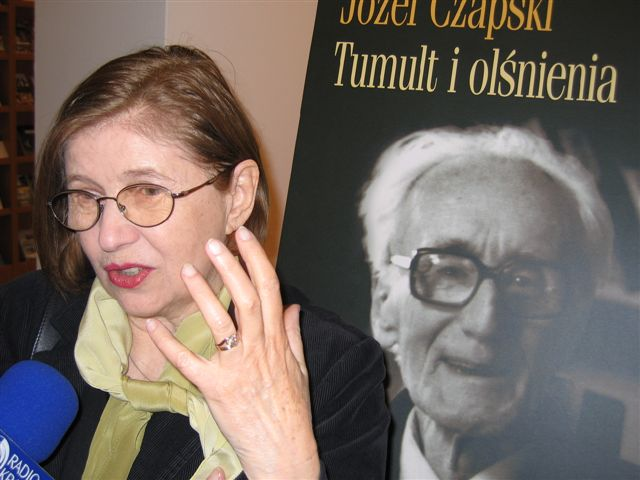
Krystyna Zachwatowicz (2005)

During the decades of communist rule, the Polish theatre employed the artistic techniques of political allusion and metaphor, in order to overcome censorship. Theatre was not created from the text alone, but from what often remained unspoken and only visually significant. At the Ludowy, plays by Aeschylus, Carlo Gozzi and Carlo Goldoni were staged. Krystyna Skuszanka prepared successful Shakespeare productions: Measure for Measure with stage design by Tadeusz Kantor (1956), The Tempest (1959), and the Twelfth Night (1961) with set design by Józef Szajna. She also staged Polish Romantic drama, such as Juliusz Słowacki's Balladyna (1956) and Sen srebrny Salomei ('Silver Dream of Salome', 1959). In 1962, Skuszanka and Jerzy Krasowski prepared a production of Adam Mickiewicz's Dziady with stage design by Szajna.

The realities of life under communism inspired broader philosophical and ideological questions. Notable plays of the time included productions by Krasowski, such as the adaptation of John Steinbeck's novel Of Mice and Men (1956) with Franciszek Pieczka (as Lenny Small) and Witold Pyrkosz (as George Milton). There was Franz Werfel's Jacobowsky and the Colonel staged in 1957 and Jerzy Broszkiewicz's Imiona władzy ('The Names of Power') directed by Skuszanka (1957), about the issues of freedom. Albert Camus's The State of Siege was staged in 1958. The novel by Juliusz Kaden-Bandrowski, Radość z odzyskanego śmietnika ('The Joy of the Repossessed Dumpsite'), premiered in 1960.

As the political climate began to worsen, the theatre was faced with increasing criticism. The directors were accused of ignoring audiences of lower educational status. Skuszanka and Krasowski left the Ludowy in 1963, unable to carry on with their ambitious repertoire. Szajna, who remained, was often sharply criticized. His productions included Nikolai Gogol's The Inspector General (1963), Tadeusz Hołuj's Puste pole ('The Empty Field', 1965), Witold Wandurski's Śmierć na gruszy ('Death on a Pear-tree', 1965), and Franz Kafka's The Castle with memorable roles by Irena Jun and Józef Wieczorek (1966). The audiences directed to attend performances through official channels, such as employee crews of state-run enterprises or public school students, stopped coming. Szajna left in 1966. In the 1970s, the theatre remained unable to find a formula that would satisfy both the authorities and the critics. Comedies were staged. Consecutive directors tried to revive the tradition of Polish national and folk theatre. An artistic revival came with the fall of communism in central-eastern Europe. In democratic Poland the Ludowy was taken over by an actor, director, and politician Jerzy Fedorowicz (1989–2012). Under his management, the theatre won considerable recognition and numerous awards. It was twice invited to the Edinburgh International Festival: in 1996 with Macbeth directed by Jerzy Stuhr and in 1997 with Antigone directed by Włodzimierz Nurkowski. Jacek Strama led the Ludowy Theatre from 2012 to 2016, and Małgorzata Bogajewska is the current director.
