= La dama de Troya =

- Genre: Telenovela
- Created by: Felipe Forero; Alejandro Torres; Guido Jácome
- Written by: Felipe Forero; Alejandro Torres; Guido Jácome
- Directed by: Toni Navia; Lilo Vilaplana
- Starring: Cristina Umaña; Andrés Juan
- Opening theme: "La dama de Troya" by Jorge Cárdenas
- Country of origin: Colombia
- Original language: Spanish
- No. of episodes: 240

Production
- Executive producer: Kepa Amuchastegui
- Producer: Amparo López
- Production company: Fox Telecolombia

Original release
- Network: RCN Televisión
- Release: April 15, 2008 – March 4, 2009

La dama de Troya is a Colombian telenovela created by Felipe Forero, Guido Jácome and Alejandro Torres Reyes. It aired on RCN Televisión from 15 April 2008 to 4 March 2009. The series stars Cristina Umaña and Andrés Juan.

== Cast ==
=== Main ===
- Cristina Umaña as Patricia Cruz
- Andrés Juan as Sebastián de la Torre
- Rolando Tarajano as Antonio de la Torre
- Myriam de Lourdes as Esther de la Torre
- Valentina Acosta as Jimena "Nena" Fontalvo
- Mauricio Figueroa as Fabián Fontalvo
- Marcela Agudelo as Susana De Fontalvo
- Adriana Ricardo as Jacinta Páez
- Roberto Cano as Martín Acero
- Claude Pimont as Pierre Le Grand
- Carolina Sabino as Julieta Segunda
- Ronald Ayazo as Gabino Enciso
- Rodolfo Valdés as Simón Enciso
- Nicole Santamaria as Betsy Grisales
- Gerardo de Francisco as Ramón Pardo
- Martha Silva as Yolanda de Pardo

=== Recurring and guest stars ===
- Rafael Martínez as Rubén
- Jacqueline Aristizábal as Camila
- Lina Angarita as Mariana Rodríguez
- José Narváez as Esteban Camargo
- Evelyn Santos as Karina
- Liliana Lozano as Carmentea
- Yesenia Valencia as Diana
- Daniel Rocha as Roque Restrepo

== Adaptation ==
In 2021, a Mexican adaptation of the telenovela titled La desalmada was produced by Televisa starring Livia Brito and José Ron.
