= Rob Palmer =

Rob Palmer may refer to:

- Rob Palmer (ice hockey, born 1952), ice hockey player for the Chicago Blackhawks
- Rob Palmer (ice hockey, born 1956), ice hockey player for the Los Angeles Kings and New Jersey Devils
- Rob Palmer (presenter) (born 1975), presenter of TV series Better Homes and Gardens

== See also ==
- Robert Palmer (disambiguation)
