= Roland Piquepaille =

Roland Piquepaille (18 October 1946 – 6 January 2009) was a French technology blogger and software engineer. He worked at Silicon Graphics and Cray Inc for over three decades. Following his retirement, he became a prominent blogger on ZDNet.

He died in Paris, France, on 6 January 2009, of complications related to an enterococcal bacteria infection.
