= Verna Mae Slone =

Verna Mae Slone (October 9, 1914 – January 5, 2009) was an Appalachian author from Knott County, Kentucky.

== Early life ==
She was born in Hindman, KY to Isom B. Slone and Sarah Owens Slone. Verna grew up in the Eastern mountains of Kentucky near the town of Pippa Passes and is the tenth generation of her family to live in Eastern Kentucky She was raised by her sister, Lorenda, for the majority of her childhood. She died at the age of 94 in the same town. Her mother died 6 weeks after giving birth to her, leaving Slone's father alone as the primary caregiver.

== Later years ==
Slone had never completed high school education because her family needed her to work, but at age 65 she decided to start her journey writing books with the intention of breaking stereotypes surrounding Appalachian people and educating them on the Appalachian way of life. Slone referred to the older members of her community and family as "wonderful story-tellers... and praised the fact that "their descriptive phrases added humor and interest, giving character to the tale". Her work began being passed around and eventually grew so much in popularity that thousands of visitors started coming to visit her for a chance to listen to her stories. Some sources record 30 or more daily visitors. In 1993 her portrait became the centerpiece of photographer Barbara Beirne's exhibit Women of Appalachia at the Smithsonian Institution in Washington. Fifteen of the 1800 quilts she made decorate the walls of the historic Hindman Settlement School. She once compared quilts to life, stating, "when we are born we are given a bundle of scraps; the way we put them together is up to us." Slone was buried in Slone Cemetery.

== What My Heart Wants to Tell ==
Slone's most famous book was published in 1979 when she was 65 years old. Her novel was called What My Heart Wants to Tell and was published by the New Republic. Her memoir focused on the rural hills of Caney Creek in Knott County, Kentucky. Verna wrote "What My Heart Wants to Tell" for her grandchildren and to honor her father, Isom B. Slone, who everyone called "Kitteneye" Her most famous, enduring quote from the text is, "God knew that it would take brave and sturdy people to survive in these beautiful but rugged hills. So he sent us his very strongest men and women." Her novel details her childhood years and destroys ignorant misconceptions about the Appalachian people. For example, Slone explains that moonshine is not merely a drink that Kentucky people drink an inordinate amount of, but a remedy for sickness. Along with depicting genuine mountain life, Slone's work revolves around her hardworking, dedicated father, "Kitteneye." Slone originally wrote her book as a gift for family members; she ensured that all thirteen of her grandchildren received a copy. The manuscript made its way to a writer who read it publicly on the National Radio, then published it with the New Republic. Verna Mae authored five other books including the novel Rennie's Way and a book about Appalachian Language called How We Talked.

== Other works ==
Slone wrote 6 books in total, including Rennie's Way and How We Talked. Rennie's Way is a "collection of family stories woven into a novel that parallels Verna Mae's life as she was raised by [her sister for most of her life]." In each of her works, Slone strongly advocated for preserving the Appalachian lifestyle.

== Family and legacy ==
Slone was married to Willie Slone. They had 5 sons, who Slone cared for during the week. Willie drove a bulldozer full-time to support the family until his death in 1989. In memory of her mother, Slone had a log house built with "200-year-old logs saved from the house where her mother was born 115 years ago." In Slone's free time, she was known as a quilter and dollmaker. She handcrafted over 1,800 quilts, along with thousands of cloth dolls. The Hindman Settlement School in Hindman, Kentucky, proudly displays 15 of Slone's quilts today. Slone's writing continues to be used in many classrooms today to bring insight and appreciation for Appalachian culture. Marrianne Worthington, a well-known educator, writer, and editor in the field of Appalachian studies, incorporates Verna Mae Slone's works into her curriculum for her students in "hopes that they, like Verna Mae Slone, will teach others the stories of Appalachia and make those words a part of their own telling hearts".

In 1993, photographer Barbara Beirne's portrait of Verna Mae Slone was the centerpiece of the Women of Appalachia exhibition at the Smithsonian Institution in Washington.
