= Megatech International =

American manufacturing company

- Type: Private
- Industry: Manufacturing
- Founded: 1990
- Headquarters: North Bergen, New Jersey, United States
- Key people: Peter Winston
- Products: Radio-controlled vehicles

Megatech is a company that designs and manufactures radio controlled entertainment. Its product line includes radio controlled planes, cars, trucks, sailboats, motorboats, submarines, blimps, and others.

== History ==
America's Hobby Center is a hobby shop that was founded in 1931 by the Winston family. In 1990, Peter Winston created Megatech International.

== Products ==
=== Avion ===
A miniature airplane that can be flown both indoors and out. Features a 7.5" wingspan, 8.4g weight, LiPo battery, and completely proportional control.

== Media appearances ==
The Megatech Blimp was mentioned on the Showtime television series Weeds in episode two of the first season. The H_{2}O Boat was featured on the June 26, 2003 episode of NBC's The Today Show, where Chris Chianelli drove the boats around in a pool with the show's hosts on a live broadcast.
