= Leonard Kemp =

Australian cricketer

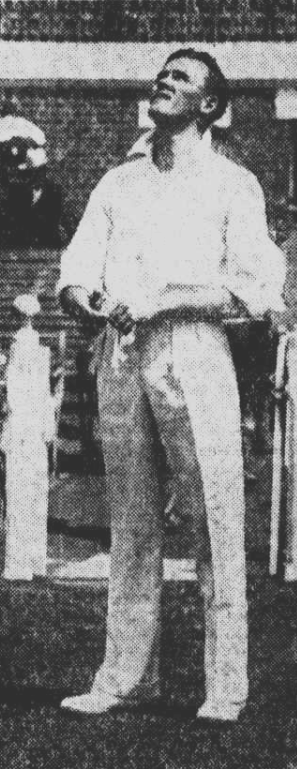

Personal information
- Born: 6 June 1909; Melbourne, Australia
- Died: 21 January 2009 (aged 99); Melbourne, Australia

Domestic team information
- Years: Team
- 1932-1934: Victoria
- Source: Cricinfo, 22 November 2015

Leonard Kemp (6 June 1909 – 21 January 2009) was an Australian cricketer. He played five first-class cricket matches for Victoria between 1932 and 1934.

== See also ==
- List of Victoria first-class cricketers
