= K. K. Govind =

K. K. Govind (c. 1917 – January 4, 2009) was an Indian freedom fighter from Kerala. During the Second World War, he was a leading volunteer in the Indian National Army. Between 1964 and 1977, he worked as business representative of the newspaper The Hindu.
