= Paul Nicholls (sportsman) =

Australian sportsman

Personal information
- Full name: Paul Allen Nicholls
- Born: 10 November 1946; East Fremantle, Western Australia
- Died: 17 January 2009 (aged 62); Nedlands, Western Australia
- Batting: Right-handed
- Bowling: Right-arm offbreak
- Role: Bowler

Domestic team information
- Years: Team
- 1971/72–1978/79: Western Australia
- 1973: Hertfordshire

Career statistics
Competition	First-class	List A
Matches	19	2
Runs scored	492	38
Batting average	23.42	19.00
100s/50s	0/0	0/0
Top score	38	34
Balls bowled	2,167	40
Wickets	30	3
Bowling average	31.43	9.33
5 wickets in innings	1	0
10 wickets in match	0	0
Best bowling	5/68	3/28
Catches/stumpings	7/–	0/–
- Source: CricketArchive, 28 May 2020

Paul Allen Nicholls (10 November 1946 – 17 January 2009) was an Australian sportsman who played for Western Australia in first-class cricket during the 1970s and played Australian rules football with the East Fremantle Football Club.

Nicholls, a right-arm off-spinner, started his career in the 1971/72 Sheffield Shield season and featured in the Western Australian side for much of the following two competitions. He then spent over four years out of the team before returning in 1977/78, but re-cement his place as the state's premier spinner.

He claimed eight wickets on his first-class debut, against South Australia at the Adelaide Oval, including a five wicket haul in the second innings. Despite his efforts, Western Australia lost the match by 25 runs. Amongst his victims in first-class cricket were the Pakistani pair of Zaheer Abbas and Mushtaq Mohammad, whom he dismissed in a tour match for Western Australia against the touring nation. In all he was part of three successful Sheffield Shield campaigns.

Nicholls spent the 1972 and 1973 English summers playing for the Haslingden Cricket Club in the Lancashire League.

Nicholls was also a good Australian rules footballer and played for East Fremantle in the Western Australian Football League. He holds a place in the club's history for his performance in the 1974 WAFL Grand Final where he kicked four goals from full-forward to help East Fremantle defeat Perth.

Later in his life, Nicholls was a successful magistrate in Western Australia before he died in 2009 following a long battle with cancer.
