= Leonidas Vargas =

Colombian drug lord (1949–2009)

- Born: May 13, 1949; Florencia, Caquetá, Colombia
- Died: January 8, 2009 (aged 59); Madrid, Spain
- Other names: "El Rey de Caquetá" ("The King of Caquetá") "El Viejo" ("The Old Man")
- Occupation: Drug lord
- Status: Deceased
- Convictions: Drug trafficking Possession of illegal firearms

Leonidas Vargas Vargas (May 13, 1949 – January 8, 2009), also known as "El Viejo" and "The King of Caqueta", was a Colombian drug lord who headed a multimillion-dollar cocaine empire associated with the Medellín Cartel and the Revolutionary Armed Forces of Colombia (FARC). Vargas became one of the richest drug lords in Colombia, as well as one of the most wanted by police.

In 1995 Vargas began serving a six-year prison term, during which he survived an assassination attack when his rivals set off a bomb at his jail. In 2006, he was again arrested in Madrid for cocaine trafficking. While awaiting a trial on those charges, Vargas was killed on January 8, 2009, when he was shot to death in a hospital bed.

== Biography ==
In his early life, Leonidas Vargas was a poor and little-educated meat vendor in the rural region of Caqueta, a southern region of Colombia. He eventually became associated with drug lords José Gonzalo Rodríguez Gacha and Pablo Escobar, the wealthy and powerful leader of the Medellín Cartel. Throughout the 1980s and 1990s, Vargas ran a multimillion-dollar cocaine empire that included a network of large cocaine-processing laboratories deep in the jungles of Caqueta. The mass-produced cocaine was then exported to the United States of America. Vargas eventually becoming one of Colombia's richest drug lords. His strongholds were among the guerrillas of the Marxist-Leninist Revolutionary Armed Forces of Colombia, with whom Vargas was believed to have established drug trafficking links.

Vargas became known as "The King of Caqueta", as well as the nickname "El Viejo", which means "The Old Man". Vargas has been accused of organizing hit squads of hired killers, and is believed to have ordered the murder of the Colombian presidential candidate Horacio Serpa. He was particularly known for a love of women, drink and football.

Vargas was jailed in Colombia in 1995 for 19 years and fined $1.5 million for drugs offenses, plus another 25 years in jail for murder and illegally carrying firearms. While imprisoned in 1997, he survived an assassination attempt when his rival set off a bomb at his jail. Vargas was released early in 2002, but authorities seized assets to the value of $40 million and 135 houses, four vehicles, two bank accounts and three companies, all of which were acquired with the proceeds of drug trafficking. Since about 2006, Vargas had been involved in a romantic relationship with Colombian actress and beauty queen, Liliana Lozano.

Spanish police arrested Vargas in Madrid in July 2006 on charges of trafficking 427 kilograms (941 lb) of cocaine, which had been discovered in a container in the port of Valencia in eastern Spain. At the time of his arrest, Vargas was in possession of a forged Venezuelan passport and was planning to travel to Germany for the final game of the World Cup Finals. At the time of his 2006 arrest, Vargas was on the list of Colombia's most-wanted cartel bosses, with a bounty of $5 million against him. Vargas was freed on conditional bail for health reasons, with a trial date to be determined later as Spanish police completed their investigation. Due to the terms of his bail, Vargas was not provided security or a police bodyguard.

== Death ==
In January 2009, Vargas was checked into the Doce de Octubre Hospital in Madrid due to heart and lung problems. He was placed in a fifth private room with one other patient. On January 8, two men came into his room while Vargas slept. One of the men stood guard in the doorway. The other man, wearing an overcoat and scarf, asked the other patient if he was Vargas. When the patient responded, "No", the man turned to Vargas, pulled out a silenced pistol and fired four shots at him, killing Vargas instantly. The gunman then threatened the other patient at gunpoint to keep quiet, saying "Don't move, don't say anything. This has nothing to do with you." The gunman then left the hospital room with the second man. A nurse who responded to the sound of the gunshots found Vargas' bullet-ridden body, and was so horrified by the sight that she required medical attention. Police set up a large dragnet around the hospital, but both men escaped. Authorities believed them to be professional hitmen from eastern Europe, who were hired to settle scores between Vargas and rival drug gangs.

On January 10, two days after Vargas was killed, his brother Fabio Vargas, 47, and girlfriend Liliana Lozano, 30, were kidnapped and shot dead in a hotel in Palmira. Authorities believed the two killings, coupled with the murder of Leonidas Vargas, were the signs of a bloody war waged to take control of Vargas' cocaine business. The murder of Leonidas Vargas also led to calls by the Patients' Defence Association and other advocacy groups calling for better security measures in Spanish hospitals. Madrid health authorities dismissed such calls, claiming further security measures would only limit people's freedoms and accessibility for visitors.

Seven arrests were made in connection with the Leonidas Vargas murder, which authorities believed was committed by an organized group involved in extortion and drug trafficking. On October 25, 2009, 24-year-old Jonathan Andrew O. was arrested in Madrid for allegedly committing the murder itself. He was arrested at the Madrid-Barajas Airport after a flight from the Colombian city Cali.
