= Daphne Rooke =

South African writer

Daphne Marie Rooke (née Pizzey) (6 March 1914 – 21 January 2009) was a South African author of works such as "Mittee", "Ratoons" and "Wizards' Country". She also wrote travel articles and books for children set in India, Australia, New Zealand, and South Africa.

== Biography ==
Daphne Rooke was born in Boksburg, Transvaal; the youngest of six children born to an Afrikaaner mother. Daphne's grandfather was Dietlof Siegfried Maré, founder of Pietersburg, who had 23 children by two wives. One of Daphne's uncles was writer Leon Maré.

Daphne's mother was Maria Magdalena Maré, born in 1878, who was known as "Mittee". She married an Englishman, Edward Knevitte or Knevitt in 1899. During the Anglo-Boer war, tensions between Afrikaans and English ran high, and the couple and their four children (Daphne's three half-brothers and a half-sister) were forced to leave Pietersburg because of Knevitt's English citizenship. The Marés and Knevitts apparently had little contact after this time.

After the death of Edward Knevitt, Daphne's mother remarried to another Englishman, Robert Pizzey, in 1911, and had two further daughters: Rosemary born in 1912 and Daphne born in 1914. Robert Pizzey fought and died in the First World War. As a child, Daphne had recurring heart and growth problems. Primarily for the sake of Daphne's health, the family left the Highveld and moved near to Durban Natal. Daphne's mother was a teacher and a journalist, and also a short-story writer. She published a collection of short stories The Children of the Veld, under the pseudonym "Mare Knevitt".

This inspired Daphne to try her hand at writing. She became a journalist and author. In 1946, she was co-winner of the Afrikaanse Pers literary prize, for a work that was eventually published as her first novel, under the title "A Grove of Fever Trees". In the meantime (1937) she had married an Australian named Irvin ("Bertie") Rooke, whom she had met while doing organizational work for the Transport Workers Union. To reconnect with Bertie's Australian family, they left for Australia in 1946. They returned to Natal in 1953, but disturbed by the police state mentality in South Africa, moved back to Australia in 1965. In the 1980s her work was "rediscovered" by the University of Natal, which awarded her an honorary doctorate in 1997. She remained in Australia until Bertie's death in 1989 when she moved to Cambridge, England, where she lived for the rest of her life.

== Bibliography ==
Based on the publication list from "Contemporary Novelists", vol.15, article by Lynne Bryer

=== Autobiography ===
- Three Rivers – A Memoir. Daffodil Press (2003) ISBN 0-9545228-0-X

=== Novels ===
- The Sea Hath Bounds. A.P.B. Bookstore (1946) later published as A Grove of Fever Trees, Houghton Mifflin (1950), Jonathan Cape (1951).
- Mittee. Victor Gollancz (1951), Houghton Mifflin (1952), Chameleon Press (1987), Penguin Books (1991), Toby Press (2007)
- Ratoons. Victor Gollancz and Houghton Mifflin (1953) Chameleon Press (1987), Toby Press (2007)
- Wizards' Country. Victor Gollancz and Houghton Mifflin (1957), Chameleon Press (1987) Toby Press (2007)
- Beti. Victor Gollancz and Houghton Mifflin (1959).
- A Lover for Estelle. Victor Gollancz and Houghton Mifflin (1961).
- The Greyling. Victor Gollancz (1962), Reynal (1963).
- Diamond Jo. Victor Gollancz and Reynal (1965).
- Boy on the Mountain. Victor Gollancz (1969).
- Margaretha de la Porte. Victor Gollancz (1974).

=== Short stories ===
- "The Friends," in South African Stories, edited by David Wright. Faber & Faber and Duell (1960).
- "Fikizolo," in Over the Horizon. Victor Gollancz (1960).

=== Children's books ===
- The South African Twins. Jonathan Cape (1953); as Twins in South Africa, Houghton Mifflin (1955).
- The Australian Twins. Jonathan Cape (1954); as Twins in Australia, Houghton Mifflin (1956).
- New Zealand Twins. Jonathan Cape (1957).
- Double Ex!. Victor Gollancz (1971).
- A Horse of His Own. Victor Gollancz (1976).

== Critical studies ==
- Orville Prescott, in The New York Times, 1 March 1950
- Dorothy Canfield Fisher, in the Book-of-the-Month News (New York), January 1952
- Sylvia Stallings, in the New York Herald Tribune, 20 December 1953
- Paul Scott, in Country Life (London), 24 May 1962
- R.W Johnson, in the Times Literary Supplement (London), 5 July 2006

== Manuscript collections ==
- Howard Gotlieb Archival Research Center, Mugar Memorial Library, Boston University, USA;
- National English Literary Museum, Grahamstown, South Africa.
