= Chris Chianelli =

Christopher John Chianelli (December 26, 1950 – January 20, 2009) was an American radio control expert, television personality, industry icon, and host of The Radio Control Show. This Web TV series is produced by Air Age Media and broadcast biweekly on www.rccaraction.com and www.modelairplanenews.com, and covers all aspects of R/C cars, boats, planes and helicopters, with information ranging from the basics of R/C to tips for the most seasoned pros.

Chianelli was born in Mineola, New York. In addition to his hobby work, he was active in several charities, including Make-A-Wish, Habitat for Humanity, and St. Jude's.

Chianelli also served as the editor-at-large for Model Airplane News magazine and hosted a Model Airplane News blog.

Chianelli became a household name among R/C enthusiasts during the six years he spent as the irreverent host of DIY Network's Radio Control Hobbies, Workin’ on the Railroad, and Robot Rivals television shows. He also made guest appearances on NBC's Today show and graced the covers of special-interest magazines.

Since 1982, Chianelli was a frequent contributor to the industry's top-rated R/C magazines, including Model Airplane News, Radio Control Car Action, Backyard Flyer, Radio Control Helicopter, and Radio Control Boat Modeler, all published by Air Age Media. He was a founding editor of Radio Control Car Action and helped to revitalize Model Airplane News.

Chianelli was an internationally read author of pieces on topics that included R/C aircraft, race boats, cars, trucks, and his specialty—internal combustion engine-performance evaluations. He was dubbed the "R/C Guru" because of his unparalleled knowledge of the R/C hobby.

Chianelli was an internal combustion miniature-engine expert for both 4- and 2-stroke engines, as well as a master model builder and scale trains enthusiast.

In 2005, he received the Hobby Ambassador of the Year award from Hobby Outlook magazine and HobbyTown USA for "Outstanding Efforts to Expand the Reach of Hobbies" and for his charitable work.

Chianelli's experience also included stints as creative director for R/C manufacturer Megatech International, which marketed a line of ready-to-fly R/C aircraft with Chianelli's name and caricature on them, and as a writer for Hobby Merchandiser, a hobby shop industry magazine.

His love of modeling began in early childhood with toy trains and slot cars. He bought a used aircraft radio in 1971 and said, "Ever since that fateful purchase, I've never had a boring moment in my life. So many models, so little time."

Chianelli was also a fan of full-scale cars and was often photographed in his red Excalibur Series III.

On January 20, 2009, Chianelli died of natural causes.
