= Zakan Jugelia =

Abkhazian politician (died 2009)

Deputy Minister for Internal Affairs of Abkhazia
- In office 2005 – 26 January 2009

Personal details
- Died: 26 January 2009 Sukhumi
- Party: Amtsakhara

Zakan Jugelia (Закан Джугелия; died 26 January 2009) was a Deputy Minister for Internal Affairs of the Republic of Abkhazia who was murdered 26 January 2009 in Sukhumi.

== Life and career ==
Jugelia was a veteran of the 1992-1993 War in Abkhazia and he was a member of the veteran movement Amtsakhara. Jugelia was head of the Department for Combating Economic Crimes within the Abkhazian Ministry for Internal Affair before becoming Deputy Minister for Internal Affairs in 2005.

== Murder ==
Jugelia was shot at 19:30 local time with a Winchester rifle while sitting on the verandah of the cafe Kiki in Sukhumi. Around 19:45 he was brought to the Sukhumi Republican Hospital with severe wounds to his neck and the left axillary region to which he then succumbed. Witnesses reported that a masked man had left his car and shot Jugelia from point-blank range in the back of the head.

On 30 January, Apsnypress reported that initial investigations put forward two possible scenarios for the murder:

1. Since Jugelia was actively fighting against drug trafficking and corruption, it is possible that someone who was directly affected by this decided to remove him.
2. The murder could have been committed by criminals in order to demonstrate the weakness of the law agencies, and to create a climate profitable for their activities.

Earlier investigators had also said that it could not be excluded that Jugelia was murdered by a foreign power in order to hamper the government's work towards socio-economic improvement.
