= Robert L. Stone =

American businessman

Robert L. Stone (December 19, 1921 – January 28, 2009) was an American business executive who was chief executive officer of The Hertz Corporation and ran the television division at Columbia Pictures.

Born in New York City on December 19, 1921, Stone served in the United States Army Air Forces during World War II, where he enlisted in 1942. As a bombardier, he flew 40 combat missions in the Pacific and was awarded the Distinguished Flying Cross and the Air Medal.

Stone was hired by a management consulting firm in 1946, after leaving his military service. In 1951, he was hired by the American Broadcasting Company, where he ultimately was named as vice president and general manager of WABC-TV, the network's flagship station in New York City. He was hired by the National Broadcasting Company in 1959, where he became general manager of the television network and president of the NBC radio network.

The RCA Corporation named him as chairman and chief executive of Hertz in 1972, moving him over NBC, which was also owned by RCA at the time. In his tenure at Hertz, the company's revenues went from $21 to $200 million by the time he left the firm in 1978. Stone was behind the decision to make O. J. Simpson the feature of the company's television and print advertising, in a series of well-known television commercials, including one in which he leapt over rows of seats in an airport, running through an airport terminal trying to get to his Hertz rental car, while a woman yelled, "Go O.J. Go!". Stone had been looking for a celebrity spokesman who would be a change from those who just talked at the camera. Many of the commercials in what started as a $12.6 million advertising campaign were run initially during telecasts of football games, with the slogan "The Superstar in Rent-A-Car".

Columbia Pictures hired him in 1978 as its chief operating officer, overseeing the studio's television division until his retirement in 1983.

Stone died at age 87 on January 28, 2009, at his winter home in Boca Grande, Florida due to heart failure. He married his second wife, the former Sheila Muldowny Bartle, in May 1968. In addition to his second wife, he was survived by his four children, two stepchildren and six grandchildren. Stone's first wife, Mary Elizabeth Lee, had died in 1966.
