= Pradera =

- Municipality and town

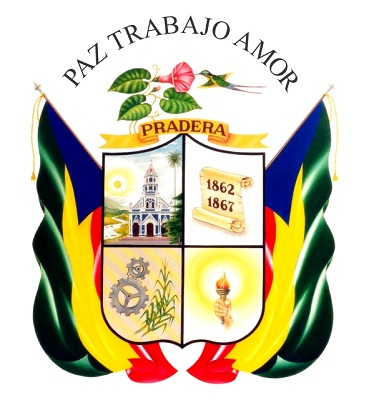
- Flag Coat of arms
- Motto: Paz, Trabajo, Amor
- Location of the municipality and town of Pradera in the Valle del Cauca Department of Colombia.
- Coordinates: 3°25′16″N 76°14′41″W
- Country: Colombia
- Department: Valle del Cauca Department
- Subregion: South
- Settled: 1862
- Incorporated: 1867

Government
  - Mayor: Francisco Javier Guzman

Area
  - Municipality and town: 356.7 km^{2} (137.7 sq mi)
  - Urban: 3.06 km^{2} (1.18 sq mi)
- Elevation: 1,070 m (3,510 ft)

Population (2018 census)
  - Municipality and town: 47,615
  - Density: 133.5/km^{2} (345.7/sq mi)
  - Urban: 41,422
  - Urban density: 13,500/km^{2} (35,100/sq mi)
- Demonym(s): Praderaño, Praderaña
- Time zone: UTC-5 (Colombia Standard Time)
- Area code: 57 + 2
- Website: Official website (in Spanish)

Pradera (Spanish pronunciation: [pɾaˈðeɾa]) is a town and municipality in the Department of Valle del Cauca, Colombia.

Pradera is one of 42 municipalities in Valle de Cauca, and is located in the south-eastern corner of the department. Its geography is characterized by large mountain ranges of the Andes and meadows, which are largely used for sugarcane cultivation.

== History ==
The town was officially established on 15 October 1862 by Rafael González Camacho, Sergio Carvajal, Sixto María Sánchez, Sixto Prado Concha, and Apolinar Obregón.

In the 19th century, the town, then a small hamlet on the Bolo river was part of the municipality of Palmira. In 1860, it was proposed to designate the town as its own village, and several names were suggested, including Nazaret and Mosquera, the later in honor of Tomás Cipriano de Mosquera. In 1867, the town was officially named "Tierra de Prados" (English: Land of Meadows) and it became locally known as Pradera. In December 1870, Pradera was designated as its own municipality led by a commissioner or sheriff.

In 1871, the first official distillery opened in the municipality, and by 1917 the first automobile arrived. In 1925, the first railroad was constructed by the company Ferrocarril del Pacífico and in 1929 the first 90 kW power plant was installed.

Today, Pradera celebrates a variety of festivals: The Feria del Dulce is celebrated in October with verbenas, cavalcades and different events; In February it hosts a festival of Andean Music; in May an art festival; in November a small-business fair; and in December it celebrates the anniversary of Mary's immaculate conception.

== Economy and infrastructure ==
Since the creation of the Pradera District, by Ordinance No. 1 of January 27, 1871, the economic base of the municipality has been agriculture and livestock. Other forms of production, such as manufacturing, constitute small-scale economic activity. Today, much of the economy revolves around the cultivation of sugar cane, green beans, and the raising of poultry. Pradera also has several shopping centers and a variety of small business producing handicrafts, industrial parts, and even silver nitrate.

When the country's economy was opened and globalized in the 1990s, the region experienced economic difficulties as the agricultural sector was unstable. As a result, the nearby cities of Cali and Palmira have attracted workers from Pradera and the town itself has suffered from low community participation and a loss of identity as many of its residents are forced to look elsewhere for employment. Several changes have been proposed to improve the current economic model, including a redistribution of municipal land distribution based on ecological regions as well as providing local governments with increased autonomy to develop their own interests.

The region is connected to Cali, Candelaria, and Pradera by highway. The municipality is outfitted with the typical infrastructure for public services in Colombia, as well as banks, stadiums, parks, and churches. Pradera has many schools and colleges, including the Institución Educativa Ateneo which has more than 1500 students, the Institución Educativa Alfredo Posada Correa, and the Institución Educativa Francisco Antonio Zea.

== Geography ==
The municipality of Pradera is characterized by flat areas between mountains. The region has a variety of freshwater resources. Several rivers run through the region, including the Bolo river, the Parraga river, and the Vílela river. There are also 12 other streams, 4 lakes, and the "Nirvana" natural park located in the Arenillo district. The association of users of the Bolo river, "Asobolo", were granted the right to represent Colombia at the World meeting on waters and rivers in Kyoto for their work in the conservation of the bolo watershed.

Pradera's borders are defined by the yellow flower creek (Spanish: Quebrada Flores Amarillas) to the north, the Parraga river to the south and west, and the Andes range to the east. As of 2018, the municipality has a total area of 356.7 km^{2} and a population of 47,615. The city itself is 1,070 meters above sea level and has an average temperature of 28 °C.

== Symbols ==
Pradera's flag and official coat of arms were both created by journalist and former mayor of the city, Hernán Barona Sosa through an artistic collaboration with local teacher Belisario Gómez. In 1968 the council accepted the designs through agreement no. 019, and they were officially instated by the mayor through decree no. 060 of the same year.

=== Flag ===
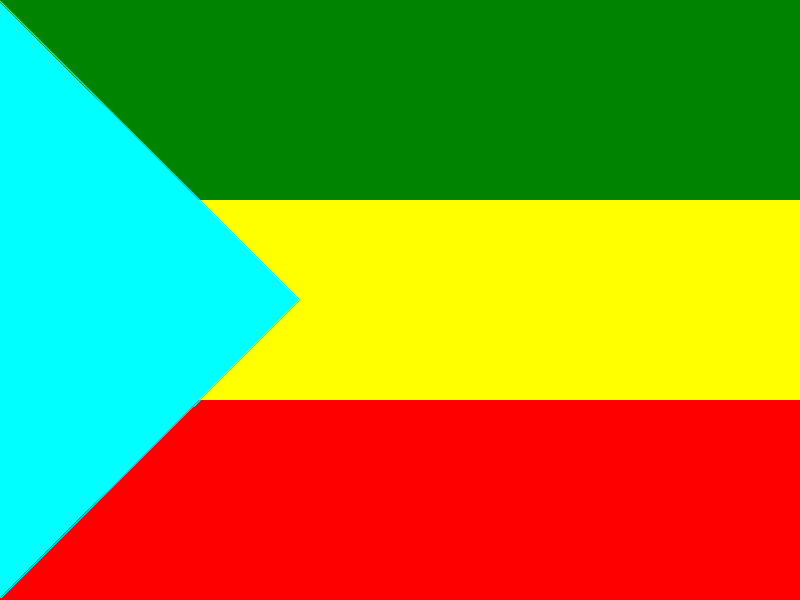
Flag of Pradera

The blue of the flag symbolises infinite space, as the sky serves as a ceiling for Pradera. The emerald green stripe represents the meadow, green areas, fields that surround the town, its natural resources, and the hope of being better every day. The yellow symbolises power, light, wealth, and wisdom. The red represents the joy of its people, and their strength and honour.

=== Coat of arms ===
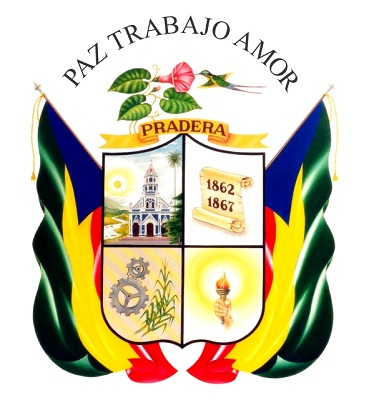
Shield of Pradera

The coat of arms contains a shield, divided into four quadrants, above which lays a yellow banner displaying the name of the municipality. A Convolvulus flower with a hummingbird are depicted above the banner, representing the common flora and fauna of Pradera gardens. They are surrounded by Pradera's motto, "Paz Trabajo Amor" (English: Peace, Work, Love).

The upper left quadrant on the shield depicts the sun rising in the east over the landmarks of the municipality: the parish church, the Bolo river, the palm trees of the park, and the mountainous landscape in background. The upper right quadrant displays a parchment scroll with two dates written on it: 1862 representing the initial settlement of the town, and 1867 when Pradera gained legal status as a municipality. Against a background of grey and yellow oblique stripes, the lower left quadrant depicts a sugar cane bush and two gears, representing the town's agriculture and commerce. The final quadrant in the lower right shows a hand carrying a torch, a symbol of freedom.

=== Anthem ===
Hernán Barona Sossa also authored the municipality's anthem: Himno de Pradera (English: Anthem of Pradera).

Donde rinde el trabajo creador
En cosecha de óptimos frutos
Una vida de Paz y de Amor

En tu iglesia tu torre cristiana
Puente esbelto tendido hacia Dios
Guarda el místico son la campana

Te circunda el río Bolo, apacible,
Que humedece la espiga estival
De los dones agrarios que lleva
En su entraña el albor cereal.

Muele el trapiche la entraña más dulce
Del fruto que altivo tu suelo le afrenda
La miel es el aire cargado de aromas
El rubio herboso que expande su don.

Tus mujeres altivas y bellas
Son tesoro de raro valor,
Madres, hijas, hermanas y esposas
de tu cívico empuje son el motor.

Añoramos volver a tus lares
Bajo el techo fraterno al calor
a medir con recuerdos de infancia
De tus calles su ensueño y primor.

Savia joven reserva en tus hijos
La primicia de un tiempo mejor
Cuando el brazo y la mente enlazados
Cambia en alegre progreso su ardor.

Con su impulso y aliento de gloria
Como ave arrullante pusiste
La bondad es blasòn de tu escudo
Y con ella en la historia surgiste.
