= Daniel Seligman =

American journalist

- Born: September 25, 1924; New York City, U.S.
- Died: January 31, 2009 (aged 84); New York City, U.S.
- Occupations: Newspaper editor and columnist
- Employer: Fortune (1950–1997)
- Spouse: Meg Sherburn
- Children: 2

Daniel Seligman (September 25, 1924 – January 31, 2009) was an American newspaper editor and columnist at Fortune magazine from 1950 to 1997. He also wrote for Forbes, Commentary, The American Mercury, Commonweal, and The New Leader.

== Biography ==
Seligman was born in Manhattan to Irving and Clare O'Brien Seligman; he was a first cousin once removed to psychologist Martin Seligman. After serving in the United States Army during World War II, Seligman graduated from New York University with a bachelor's degree.

=== Fortune magazine ===
He wrote for The American Mercury, Commonweal, and The New Leader before being hired by Fortune magazine in 1950 as a writer. He later became an editor at Fortune, and in his final two decades at the publication before his retirement in 1997, he wrote more than 400 of the magazine's Keeping Up columns, even after stepping down as associate managing editor in 1988. In a February 1988 editorial marking Seligman's transition to a contributing editor after 37 years at the magazine, the managing editor of Fortune, Marshall Loeb, described Seligman as "an acerbic slayer of (mostly liberal) prig-headedness ... [who] uses elegance and trenchant wit to wage his never-ending battle against fustian thinking."

=== A Question of Intelligence ===
Seligman wrote extensively on taboos such as political correctness and genetics. His book, A Question of Intelligence: The IQ Debate in America, adduced evidence that Intelligence quotient is at least partially heritable and that there are meaningful differences in IQ between races. In a review published in the December 1992 issue of Commentary magazine, Charles Murray, author of The Bell Curve, another book on the IQ issue, described how Seligman had been approached by the Whittle corporation and asked to write a book on IQ for its Whittle books series of brief books covering scholarly topics aimed at the general public. After submitting his completed manuscript in 1990 and proceeding uneventfully through the editing process, the publisher decided that Seligman would be paid the agreed-upon fee, but that they would not publish his manuscript. Free to take the work elsewhere, he doubled the size of his original submission and shifted publishers to Birch Lane Press.

=== Mathematical methods ===
Seligman used quantitative methods to support arguments regarding genetics, the connection between socioeconomic status and life spans, the connection between looks and salaries for lawyers and the use of betting at race tracks as a method of laundering money.

His use of probability and math in his columns was shown in a 1992 column in which he argued that the overwhelming number of Conservative Party members of Parliament of the United Kingdom caught up in sex scandals was unlikely to be due to chance. Seligman offered a hypothetical jar filled with 331 blue marbles (representing the number of Conservative MPs at the time) and 269 red marbles (representing the number of Labor MPs) from which a blindfolded observer draws six marbles. The probability that all six would be blue (meaning that all six scandals would be tied to Conservative MPs) was 2.76%.

=== Death ===
A resident of Manhattan, Seligman died at age 84 on January 31, 2009, from multiple myeloma. He was survived by his wife, the former Meg Sherburn, a son, a daughter, four grandchildren, and a brother and sister.

== Bibliography ==
- A Question of Intelligence: The IQ Debate in America. New York City. Carol Publishing Group, 1992. ISBN 978-1-55972-131-8
