= Anne Moscona =

American virologist

- Born: Chicago, Illinois, U.S.
- Education: Harvard University (BA); Columbia University (MD)
- Scientific career
- Workplaces: Mount Sinai Medical Center; Weill Cornell Medical Center; Columbia University Medical Center

Anne Moscona is an American virologist and pediatrician. Her research has identified cell entry mechanisms for enveloped respiratory viruses, with applications to parainfluenza virus, Nipah virus, measles virus, and other viruses, and has applied this knowledge to the development of antiviral strategies to prevent infection by viruses including SARS-CoV-2. Since 2016, she has served as the Sherie L. Morrison Professor of Microbiology & Immunology, Professor of Pediatrics, and Professor of Physiology & Cellular Biophysics at Columbia University Medical Center in New York City, where she also directs the Center for Host Pathogen Interaction. In 2022, Moscona was elected as president of the American Society for Virology, the nation's leading virology research organization.

== Early life and education ==
Moscona was born in Chicago, Illinois, where her parents, Aron Moscona and Malka Moscona, were Israeli-American developmental biologists at the University of Chicago. Moscona received her BA in Molecular Biology & Biochemistry from Harvard University, and MD from Columbia University College of Physicians and Surgeons.

== Career ==
Moscona completed her clinical and research training at Mount Sinai Health System in New York City. She was promoted to tenured professor in 2001 and served as chief of pediatric infectious diseases and vice chair for research until 2005. In 2005, she became professor of Pediatrics and of Microbiology and Immunology, vice chair for research of Pediatrics, and Chief of Pediatric Infectious Diseases at the Weill Cornell Medical Center, before moving to Columbia in 2015 as a tri-departmental professor and center director. Moscona's research focuses on understanding how viruses enter human cells and how to use this knowledge to design better tools to prevent viral infection. Her research program focuses on paramyxoviruses, a family of negative-sense RNA viruses that cause severe illness in humans, and her group has developed new techniques to block viral infection through fusion inhibition, most recently developing fusion inhibitory peptides for SARS-CoV-2. She is frequently consulted as a medical expert during viral outbreaks, including epidemic and pandemic influenza. Her research has been featured in outlets including Nature, Science, The New England Journal of Medicine, The New York Times, CNN, NBC, ABC and The Hill.

== COVID-19 ==
On November 5, 2020, The New York Times reported that Moscona's research group had collaboratively developed "A nasal spray that blocks the absorption of the SARS-CoV-2 virus..." and that it had "...completely protected ferrets it was tested on, according to a small study..." According to the article, the therapeutics are patent pending and awaiting market production.

== Awards ==
- 1985: Charles H. Revson Foundation Fellowship for Biomedical Research.
- 1992: Elected to the Society for Pediatric Research.
- 1992: Pediatric Infectious Disease Society Young Investigator Award.
- 1992: Hirschl/Monique Weill-Caulier Career Scientist Award.
- 2002: Elected to American Society for Clinical Investigation.
- 2006: Burroughs Welcome Fund Pathogenesis of Infectious Disease Award Advisory Committee.
- 2009: Elected to Fellowship in the American Academy of Microbiology.
- 2019: Elected Councilor for Medical Virology, American Society for Virology.
- 2020: Harrington Discovery Institute Awardee (COVID program).
- 2022: Elected President of the American Society for Virology.
