= Joanna Wiszniewicz =

Polish academic and historian

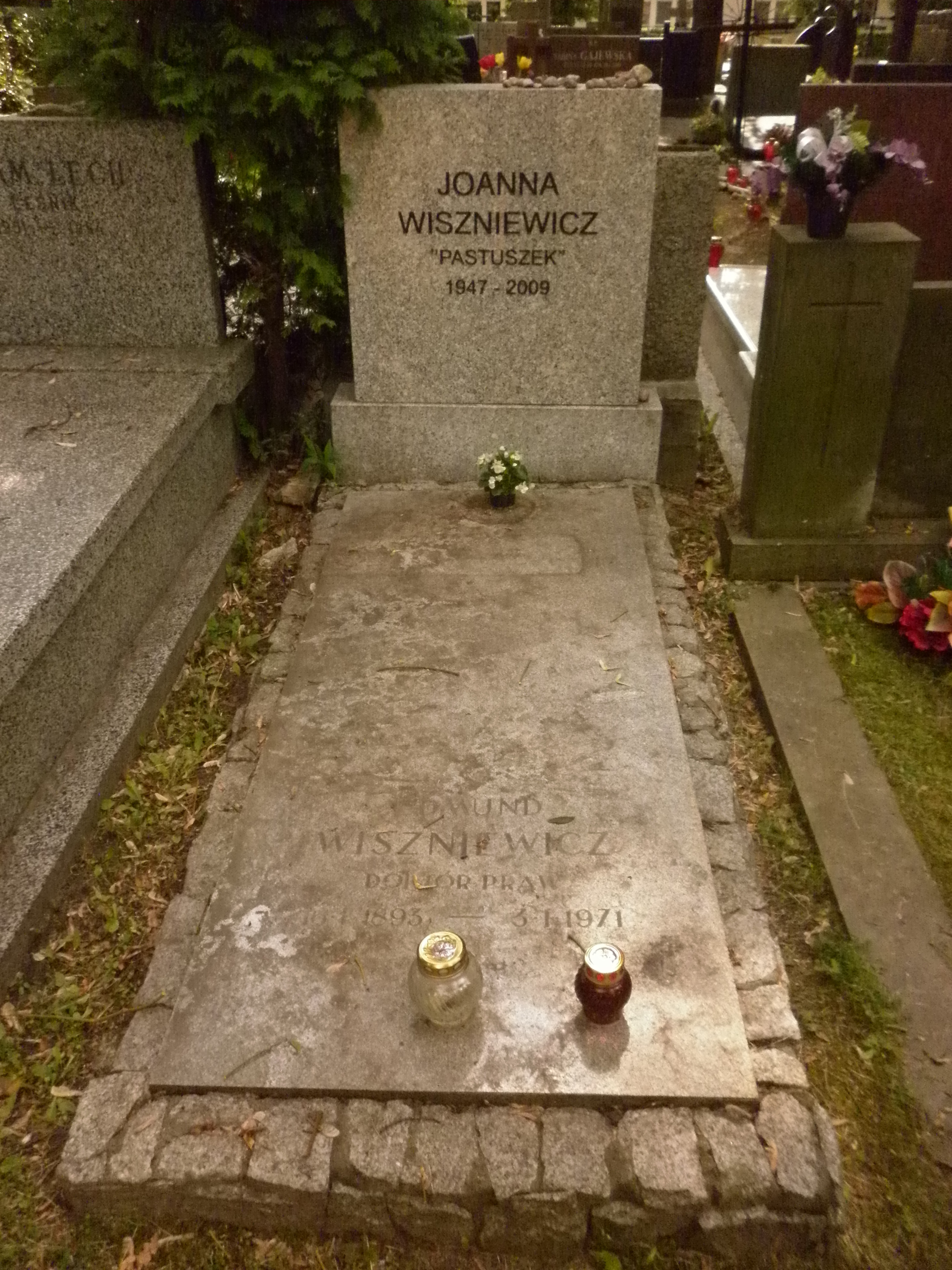
The grave of Joanna Wiszniewicz at the Powązki Military Cemetery

Joanna Wiszniewicz (18 March 1947 – 31 January 2009) was a Polish academic and historian. She was affiliated with the Jewish Historical Institute and specialized in the history of the Jews in Poland. Her writing was published in such periodicals as Jewish History Quarterly, Karta, Midrasz, Gazeta Wyborcza, and ResPublica Nowa. She authored A Life Cut in Two. Stories of the March Generation and And Yet I Still Have Dreams. A Story of a Certain Loneliness. She died on 31 January 2009, aged 61.

== Sources ==
- (in Polish) Joanna Wiszniewicz obituary
