= Bal Samant =

Indian writer (1924–2009)

Bal Gangadhar Samant (27 May 1924 – 18 January 2009) was an Indian writer. He wrote around 80 books in Marathi on a wide range of topics from fiction, biography, Marathi dramas and history. His books include a biography of Richard Francis Burton, (titled Shapith Yaksha), Hitler, Deenanath Mangeshkar, Marathi natyasangeet, reincarnation, Bal Gandharva, elephants (titled Gajaraja), death and many more.

Saprem Namaskar (सप्रेम नमस्कार) and Shapit Yaksha (शापित यक्ष) are two of his works.

He was awarded the Padma Shri in 2004 for Literature and education.

Samant died on 18 January 2009 after prolonged illness.
