= Quirino De Ascaniis =

Quirino De Ascaniis (5 August 1908 – 11 January 2009) was an Italian-born priest who was the longest serving member of PIME. Until his death at the age of 100 in 2009, he was a missionary in China (Hong Kong). He was born in Giulianova.
