= Marta Ingarden =

Polish architect and engineer

- Born: Marta Bińkowska; 8 September 1921; Lviv
- Died: 18 January 2009 (aged 87); Kraków, Poland
- Education: Lviv Polytechnic, Tadeusz Kościuszko University of Technology
- Occupations: Architect, engineer

Marta Ingarden (born Marta Bińkowska 8 September 1921 – 18 January 2009) was a Polish architect and engineer.

== Early life ==
Ingarden was born on 8 September 1921 in Lviv (then in Poland). She graduated from the Queen Jadwiga Gymnasium and Secondary School in Lviv in 1939. She began her studies at the Faculty of Architecture at the Lviv Polytechnic, which she was able to continue also during the Soviet occupation of Lviv from September 1939.

In 1945, Ingarden began her studies at the Faculty of Architecture at the Politechnika Krakowska, which she completed in 1948.

== Career ==
Following graduation, she took up a job as a designer in the Construction Office of the Coal Industry in Kraków, then in the Directorate of Workers' Housing Estates, and from 1 January 1950 in the Central Office of Projects and Studies of Housing Estates ZOR for the city of Nowa Huta.

Together with her husband Janusz Ingarden, Ingarden designed and supervised the construction of many buildings in Nowa Huta. Among them the Chamber Theatre, (for the unrealised Nowa Huta Theatre), and buildings S and Z of the Lenin Steelworks Administration Centre.

In 1957, alongside her husband Janusz, Ingarden received the second degree award for the design of the "experimental building" in the B-32 housing estate, now the Szklane Domy housing estate. Her projects include Nowa Huta, Ludowy Theatre, and Osiedle Szklane Domy/

== Personal life ==
Marta Ingarden died on 18 January 2009 in Kraków and her funeral took place on 24 January 2009 at the Salwator Cemetery.

== Gallery ==
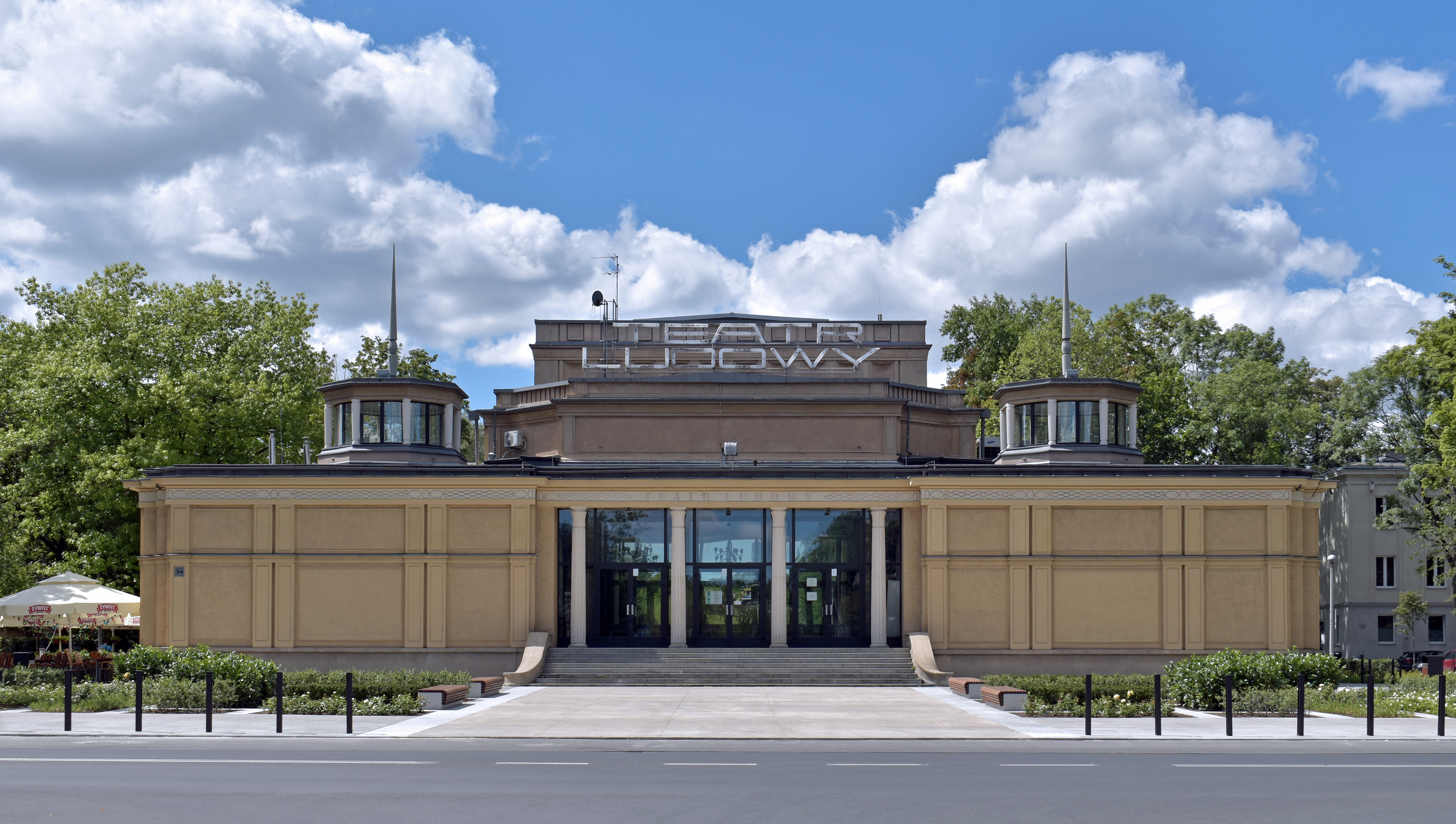
Ludowy Theatre, Nowa Huta, 1955

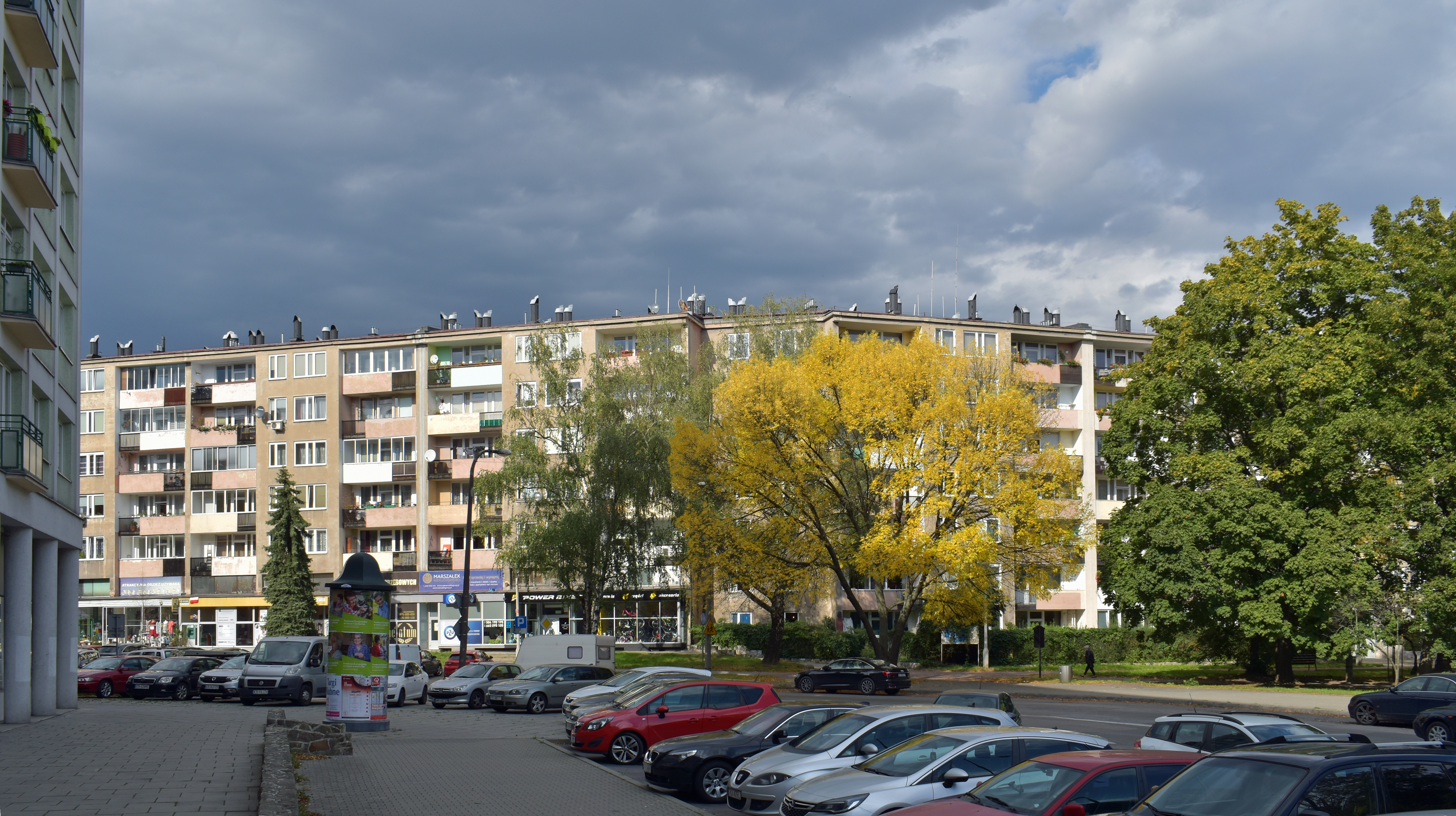
"Szwedzki" block of flats, Nowa Huta, 1957

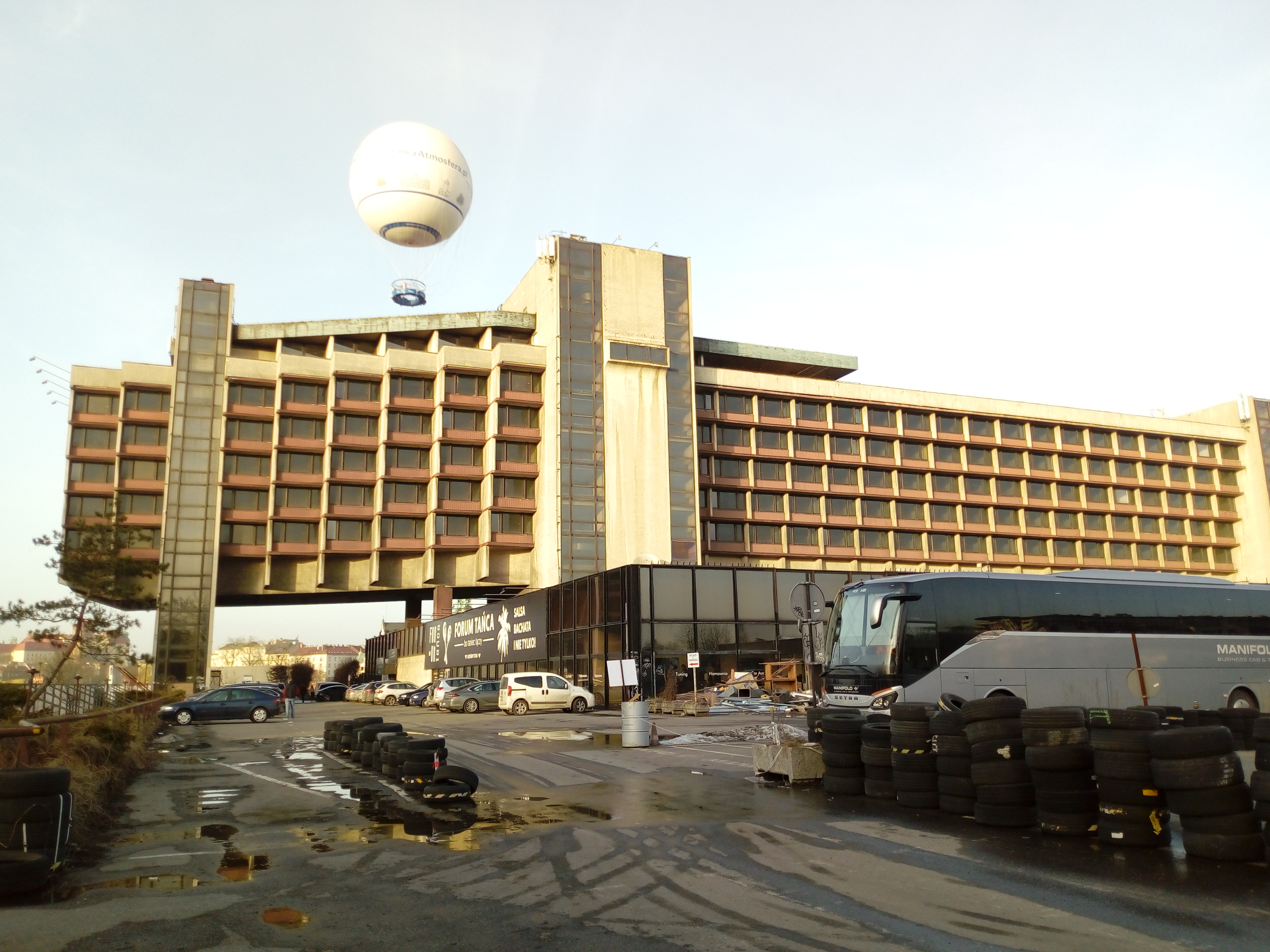
Hotel Forum Kraków, 1978
