= Moscona (horse) =

Chilean Thoroughbred racehorse

- Sire: Mocito Guapo
- Grandsire: Good Manners
- Dam: Chispita
- Damsire: Chairman Walker
- Sex: Mare
- Foaled: August 13, 1986
- Country: Chile
- Colour: Bay
- Breeder: Haras Tarapacá
- Owner: Stud El Sheik (Marcel Zarour Atanacio)
- Trainer: Jorge Inda Meyer
- Record: 9: 9–0–0
- Earnings: CLP$28,450,000

Major wins
- Tanteo de Potrancas (1989) Clásico Arturo Lyon Peña (1989); Mil Guineas (1989); Clásico Polla de Potrancas (1989); Gran Criterium Mauricio Serrano Palma (1989) Clásico Independencia (1989)

Moscona was an undefeated Chilean Thoroughbred racehorse.

== Background ==
Moscona was bred by Haras Mocito Guapo and sired by Mocito Guapo, a graded stakes winner in Argentina. Moscona was the second foal from Chispita, an unraced mare by Chairman Walker. Chispita's first foal was Bethia, by Brokers Tip, foaled in 1984, who won the 1987 Mil Guineas María Luisa Solari Falabella.

== Racing history ==
Moscona ran only in the year 1989 as both a two and three-year-old, winning all nine of the races she ran in, including six Group One races. She was considered equally talented on both dirt and turf.

Moscona debuted on March 15, 1989, as a two-year-old in a 1200-meter race at Hipódromo Chile, winning the race. The next month, she won the ungraded stakes race Clásico Provita and the Group Three Clásico Juan Cavieres Mella. From that point on, Moscona ran exclusively in Group One races.

In June, Moscona won the Group One Tanteo de Potrancas, a 1500-meter race on the dirt and first race of the Chilean Fillies Triple Crown, by several lengths. In July, Moscona ran at Club Hípico de Santiago for the first time in winning the Group One Clásico Arturo Lyon Peña, a 1600-meter turf race, by about three-quarters of a length. In August, Moscona won the second race in the Chilean Fillies Triple Crown, the Group One Mil Guineas. Nine days later, she won the Group One Polla de Potrancas at Club Hípico de Santiago.

In the Group One Gran Criterium, Moscona's only race against males, she finished second to Monín by three lengths but was later declared the winner of the race. The disqualification of Monín was controversial.

Moscona's final race was the Group One Clásico Independencia, run over 2000 meters. After winning the race, Moscona was retired and exported to Australia.

== Broodmare record and death ==
Moscona was the dam of three foals. Her first foal, Chile Snippets, by Snippets, was foaled in 1992 and won a handicap race. Little Shoes, by Palace Music, was foaled in 1994 and won eight of thirty-eight races. Moscona's final foal was Bluebeard, by Bluebird, foaled in 1995, who won a maiden race.

Moscona died in Australia on October 1, 1996, at the age of ten.

== Pedigree ==
Pedigree of Moscona (CHI), bay mare, foaled August 13, 1986
Sire Mocito Guapo	Good Manners	Nashua	Nasrullah
Sire Mocito Guapo	Good Manners	Nashua	Segula
Sire Mocito Guapo	Good Manners	Fun House	The Doge
Sire Mocito Guapo	Good Manners	Fun House	Recess
Sire Mocito Guapo	La Chiflada	Right of Way	Honeyway
Sire Mocito Guapo	La Chiflada	Right of Way	Magnificent
Sire Mocito Guapo	La Chiflada	La Maleva	Cardanil
Sire Mocito Guapo	La Chiflada	La Maleva	Margot
Dam Chispita	Chairman Walker	Buckpasser	Tom Fool
Dam Chispita	Chairman Walker	Buckpasser	Busanda
Dam Chispita	Chairman Walker	Swansea	Turn-To
Dam Chispita	Chairman Walker	Swansea	Somethingroyal
Dam Chispita	Fillette	Roi Dagobert	Sicambre
Dam Chispita	Fillette	Roi Dagobert	Dame d'Atour
Dam Chispita	Fillette	Jody T.	Bold Ruler
Dam Chispita	Fillette	Jody T.	Mainpoint
