= Joe Erskine (American boxer) =

American boxer

Joey Erskine
Personal information
- Nationality: (United States) American
- Born: Joseph Harold Erskine; October 17, 1930 New York, New York, USA
- Died: January 16, 2009 (aged 78) Christiansted, St. Croix, USVI
- Weight: Welterweight

Boxing career
- Stance: Orthodox

Boxing record
- Total fights: 11
- Wins: 4
- Win by KO: 0
- Losses: 6
- Draws: 1
- No contests: 0

Joseph Harold "Joey" Erskine (October 17, 1930 – January 16, 2009) was an American athlete who was active as a welterweight boxer in 1953 and 1954, and as a long distance runner from 1975 to 1980.

== Professional boxing record ==
4 Wins (0 knockouts, 4 decisions), 6 Losses (1 knockout, 5 decisions), 1 Draw
Result	Record	Opponent	Type	Round	Date	Location	Notes
Loss	9-8-5	(United States) Joe Lissy	KO	5	9 Sep 1954	(United States) Eintracht Oval, Astoria, New York	Erskine failed to regain consciousness in the ring but recovered in the dressing room.
Loss	1-3-2	(United States) O'Dell Hayes	PTS	4	3 Sep 1954	(United States) Madison Square Garden, New York, New York	
Win	4-11-1	(United States) Willie Sydnor	PTS	6	12 Aug 1954	(United States) Fort Hamilton Arena, Brooklyn, New York	
Win	1-2-1	(United States) O'Dell Hayes	PTS	4	14 Jul 1954	(United States) Madison Square Garden, New York, New York	
Loss	8-7-4	(United States) Joe Lissy	PTS	4	17 May 1954	(United States) St. Nicholas Arena, New York, New York	
Win	4-0-4	(United States) Paul Kostopoulos	PTS	6	30 Apr 1954	(United States) St. Nicholas Arena, New York, New York	
Loss	7-6-4	(United States) Joe Lissy	PTS	4	19 Apr 1954	(United States) Eastern Parkway Arena, Brooklyn, New York	
Loss	6-6-4	(United States) Joe Lissy	PTS	4	29 Mar 1954	(United States) Eastern Parkway Arena, Brooklyn, New York	
Loss	9-2-1	(United States) Artie Thelemaque	PTS	4	12 Mar 1954	(United States) Madison Square Garden, New York, New York	
Win	5-0-0	(United States) Paddy Flood	PTS	4	1 Dec 1953	(United States) Westchester County Center, White Plains, New York	
Draw	4-1-1	(United States) Roger Dennis	PTS	6	28 Nov 1953	(United States) Community Building, Waterville, Maine	

== Long distance running career ==
In the mid-1970s while in his mid-forties, Erskine, as a member of the Millrose Athletic Association, became a champion ultramarathoner participating in such races as the Boston and New York Marathons, the New York Road Runner Club's Metropolitan 50 Miler, as well as the London to Brighton Ultramarathon.
