= Geoffrey Brooke (pentathlete) =

British modern pentathlete

Personal information
- Born: 25 April 1920 Bath, England
- Died: 6 January 2009 (aged 88) Balcombe, England

Sport
- Sport: Modern pentathlon

Geoffrey Brooke DSC (25 April 1920 – 6 January 2009) was a British modern pentathlete. He competed at the 1948 Summer Olympics.

== Personal life ==
During the Second World War, Brooke served in the Royal Navy on the destroyer HMS Douglas and the battleships HMS Nelson and HMS Prince of Wales. He survived the sinking of the latter in December 1941 and managed to escape Singapore in February 1942. Brooke was awarded the Distinguished Service Cross for putting out fires on HMS Formidable in the latter part of the war and served in the navy until 1958.
