= Des Newton (model maker) =

Maker of model ships in bottles

Dennis Newton (10 May 1942 – 30 January 2009), was a noted maker of model ships in bottles, holding the world record for the smallest whisky bottle in which two ships were inserted. Newton appeared on Blue Peter, placing a Blue Peter badge in a bottle.

Newton, born in Barrow-in-Furness when the town was still Lancashire, England grew up with boats and eventually became a welder in the towns shipyards. He said that because he was small, he was always the one "picked out to weld the inside of the rudders and masts and other nasty places were no other person could reach."

Newton also placed a model Royal Yacht Britannia in a bottle for the Queen, noting that the model was a "very difficult one", citing details such as Royal standards and "glazed cockpit screens on the royal barge".

Newton worked as a "ship in a bottle" demonstrator at the Merseyside Maritime Museum for over 20 years.

In 1989, Newton was awarded the Lifeboatman statuette for his services to the RNLI. Des and his wife were jointly made Life Governors of the RNLI.
