= Aron Moscona =

American developmental biologist (1921–2009)

Aron Arthur Moscona
- Born: July 4, 1921; Haifa, Mandatory Palestine
- Died: January 14, 2009 (aged 87); Manhattan, New York, U.S.
- Citizenship: American
- Education: Hebrew University of Jerusalem (PhD)
- Known for: Cell adhesion, identification of cell-surface recognition molecules (cadherins)
- Awards: National Academy of Sciences (1977); American Academy of Arts and Sciences (1987)
- Scientific career
- Fields: Developmental biology
- Workplaces: Hebrew University of Jerusalem; Strangeways Research Laboratory; Rockefeller University; University of Chicago

Aron Arthur Moscona (July 4, 1921 – January 14, 2009) was an American developmental biologist who studied how embryos develop, and how the undifferentiated cells within the developing embryo interact with each other and form into the tissues and organs of a living entity.

== Early life and career ==
Raised in Haifa, Israel, Moscona was awarded a doctoral degree from the Hebrew University of Jerusalem. He was a longtime faculty member at the University of Chicago, together with his wife Malka. Moscona was also employed by the Strangeways Research Laboratory in Cambridge, England and at the Marine Biological Laboratory in Woods Hole, Massachusetts.

== Scientific work ==
In experiments performed through the 1960s, Moscona was able to separate embryonic cells using enzymes and then found that they were able to reform in their original structures once they were allowed to grow back together. His early work resulted in the identification by Masatoshi Takeichi of a class of proteins called cadherins which play a role in cell adhesion by allowing molecules to recognize each other. As he noted in a 1961 article in Scientific American, without the ability of these proteins to allow cells to form bonds with similar cells, "the human body would collapse into a heap of disconnected, individual cells, many of them quite indistinguishable from certain free-living protozoa." The article included photographs showing how mixtures of cells in flasks differentiated themselves by combining with like cells and how that ability faded over a period of weeks, with newer cells better able to recombine into structures closely resembling their embryonic arrangement than were older ones. He found that "Cells dissociated from adult animals usually do not recohere at all".

== Applications ==
By 1981, techniques Moscona developed were used to grow brain cells in solution, with cells in the growth medium forming connections with other neurons.

Other experiments found that like cells from across species shared common features of their cellular recognition signaling mechanism, in which a mixture of embryonic kidney cells from mice and chickens would form structures combining cells from both species. He also developed growth mediums, including solutions made from clotted blood diluted in saline, that were used by other researchers in their work. He found that changes in the swirling speed and temperature of the solutions would affect the growth of the cells in the medium.

== Death ==
Moscona died at age 87 on January 14, 2009 in Manhattan of heart failure. He was survived by his wife, daughter and two grandchildren.
