= Robert Palmer (vintner) =

American advertising executive and vintner

- Born: Robert Joseph Prignano; July 16, 1934; Forest Hills, Queens, New York, U.S.
- Died: January 16, 2009 (aged 74)
- Occupation: Advertising executive

Robert Palmer (July 16, 1934 – January 16, 2009) was an American advertising executive who became a vintner and developers of the wine industry on the North Fork of New York's Long Island.

He was born Robert Joseph Prignano on July 16, 1934, in Forest Hills, Queens. He adopted the surname Palmer when he started working as he felt people found it too hard to spell. He went to school in Queens Village, Queens and attended Chaminade High School in Mineola, New York. He did not attend college and started employment in the advertising industry in his early teens. By 1970, he was president and chief executive of Kelly Nason, growing its billings from $14 million to $140 million by the time he left the position in 1978. He started a media buying service, called RJ Palmer, in 1979, which he sold in the 1990s but remained active in the business until two years before his death.

After selling his interest in Kelly Nason, he bought land for his vineyard in 1983 in Aquebogue, in Suffolk County, New York, despite knowing almost nothing about the wine business. The winery he opened in 1986, Palmer Vineyards produces up to 16,000 cases of wine annually, specializing in Cabernet Franc and sauvignon blanc. His company was one of the first to export wine grown on Long Island internationally. His wines have been served on American Airlines, at Walt Disney World, and at Gallagher's Steak House in Manhattan, where it is served as the house wine.

Despite a personal preference for martinis, Palmer would taste all of his own wines and exercise final approval on his products, but did not otherwise prefer to drink wine. He had been impressed with people who could accurately identify wines while blindfolded by vineyard and a vintage, which led him to pursue wine tasting as a hobby.

Palmer died at age 74 on January 16, 2009, of a blood infection. He was survived by the former Lorraine Wittmer, his wife of 50 years, four daughters and three grandsons.
