= Religion in South Asia =

Religion in South Asia (2010 estimate)
1. Hinduism (60.0%)
2. Islam (34.0%)
3. Others (6.00%)

In 2010, South Asia had the world's largest population of Hindus, about 510 million Muslims, over 27 million Sikhs, 35 million Christians and over 25 million Buddhists. Hindus make up about 60 percent or about 900 million and Muslims at 34 percent or 510 million of the overall South Asia population, while Buddhists, Jains, Zoroastrians, Sikhs, and Christians constitute most of the rest. The Hindus, Buddhists, Jains, Sikhs, Zoroastrians, and Christians are concentrated in India, Nepal, Sri Lanka and Bhutan, while the Muslims are concentrated in Afghanistan (99%), Bangladesh (91%), Pakistan (96%) and Maldives (100%).

Indian religions (also known as Dharmic religions) are the religions that originated in the Indian subcontinent; namely Hinduism, Jainism, Buddhism and Sikhism. The Indian religions are distinct yet share terminology, concepts, goals and ideas, and from South Asia spread into East Asia and Southeast Asia. Early Christianity and Islam were introduced into coastal regions of South Asia by merchants who settled among the local populations. Later Sindh, Balochistan, and parts of the Punjab region saw conquest by the Arab caliphates along with an influx of Muslims from Persia and Central Asia, which resulted in spread of both Shia and Sunni Islam in parts of northwestern region of South Asia. Subsequently, under the influence of Muslim rulers of the Islamic sultanates and the Mughal Empire, Islam spread in South Asia. About one-third of the world's Muslims are from South Asia.

== History ==
=== Ancient period ===
South Asia was primarily Hindu in ancient times. Buddhism appeared around 500 BCE.

Christianity and Islam made an appearance in Kerala during this time period; Saint Thomas is believed to have travelled to Kerala soon after the death of Jesus and converted some people, while the first mosque to be built in India was built during the Islamic prophet Muhammad's lifetime in Kerala. Islam also established itself in Sindh due to Umayyad invasions soon after Muhammad's death.

Some Jews and Zoroastrians came to South Asia because they were fleeing religious persecution.

=== Medieval period ===
Centuries of Islamic invasion and rule over South Asia in the medieval era began to change the religious character of the region. Sufism played a significant role in the spread of Islam during this time. Sikhism emerged in this era, bringing a message of equality and creating military resistance to Muslim rule.

Nepal's formation during this period occurred in part due to the desire of Hindus to avoid being influenced by the dominant Muslim Mughal Empire and British Christian missionaries.

=== Colonial era ===
Religion in British India in the 1871–1872 Census (data includes modern-day India, Bangladesh, most of Pakistan (including Sindh, Punjab, and Balochistan), Kashmir, and coastal Myanmar))
1. Hinduism (73.1%)
2. Islam (21.4%)
3. Buddhism and Jainism (1.49%)
4. Sikhism (0.62%)
5. Christianity (0.47%)
6. Others (2.68%)
7. Religion not known (0.22%)

Christianity grew to some extent during the colonial era; the Goa Inquisition committed by the Portuguese helped Catholicism establish itself in Goa, while British missionaries spread Christianity through the rest of India.

=== Modern era ===
Religious tensions increased with the independence of British India, as it was partitioned into a Hindu-majority India and a Muslim-majority Pakistan (which later became Pakistan and Bangladesh), and many died during the creation of the new countries. Tensions further increased with Pakistani terrorist attacks on and Pakistani military conflicts with India.

Religious nationalism has grown in the post-colonial era. Pakistan converted from a secular republic to an Islamic Republic after Independence, while Bangladesh made Islam the state religion (though while maintaining secularism in the Constitution). Hindu nationalism has grown since the 2014 election of the Bharatiya Janata Party (BJP) in India.

== South Asia by religion ==
=== Hinduism ===
Hinduism is the largest religion in South Asia with about 1.2 billion Hindus, forming just under two-thirds of South Asia's population. South Asia has the largest population of Hindus in the world, with about 99% of all global Hindus being from South Asia. Hinduism is the dominant religion in India and Nepal and is the second-largest religion in Bangladesh, Pakistan, Sri Lanka, and Bhutan.

Indo-Aryan migrations brought the Indo-Aryans to South Asia, where they compiled and composed the Vedic corpus during the Vedic period (ca. 1500-500 BCE) across present-day Northern India, Pakistan and Afghanistan. The subsequent period, between and , was "a turning point between the Vedic religion and Hindu religions", and a formative period for Hinduism, Jainism and Buddhism. The Epic and Early Puranic period, from c. and 500 CE, saw the onset of the Hindu synthesis, followed by the classical "Golden Age" of India (), which coincides with the Gupta Empire.

Following the conquest of Islamic rulers in the Indian subcontinent and spread of Islam in South Asia, an era featuring persecution of Hindus began and continued until the end of Mughal Empire. The Vijayanagara and Maratha Empire significantly protected and revived Hinduism in the Indian subcontinent, while the Jaffna Kingdom and Gorkha dynasty have significantly protected Hinduism in Sri Lanka and Nepal respectively.

=== Islam ===
Islam is the second-largest religion in South Asia after Hinduism, with more than 650 million Muslims living there, forming about one-third of the region's population. Islam first spread along the coastal regions of the Indian subcontinent and Sri Lanka, almost as soon as it started in the Arabian Peninsula, as the Arab traders brought it to South Asia. South Asia has the largest population of Muslims in the world, with about one-third of all Muslims living here. Islam is the dominant religion in half of the South Asian countries (Pakistan, Maldives, Bangladesh and Afghanistan). It is the second largest religion in India and third largest in Sri Lanka and Nepal.

On the Indian subcontinent, Islam first appeared in the southwestern tip of the peninsula, in today's Kerala state. Arabs traded with Malabar even before the birth of Prophet Muhammad. Native legends say that a group of Sahaba, under Malik Ibn Deenar, arrived on the Malabar Coast and preached Islam. Local kings who converted to Islam existed in places such as the Western Coastal Plains as early as the 7th century. According to that legend, the first mosque of India was built by the mandate of the last King of Chera Perumals of Makotai, who accepted Islam and received the name Tajudheen during the lifetime of the Islamic prophet Muhammad (c. 570–632). On a similar note, Malabar Muslims on the western coast also claim that they converted to Islam in Muhammad's lifetime. According to Qissat Shakarwati Farmad, the Masjids at Kodungallur, Kollam, Madayi, Barkur, Mangalore, Kasaragod, Kannur, Dharmadam, Panthalayini, and Chaliyam, were built during the era of Malik Dinar, and they are among the oldest Masjids (mosques) in the Indian Subcontinent. Historicaly, the Barwada Mosque in Ghogha, Gujarat built before 623 CE, Cheraman Juma Mosque (629 CE) in Methala, Kerala and Palaiya Jumma Palli (630 CE) in Kilakarai, Tamil Nadu are three of the first mosques in South Asia.

The first incursion occurred through sea by Caliph Umar's governor of Bahrain, Usman ibn Abu al-Aas, who sent his brother Hakam ibn Abu al-Aas to raid and reconnoitre the Makran region around 636 CE or 643 AD long before any Arab army reached the frontier of India by land. Al-Hakim ibn Jabalah al-Abdi, who attacked Makran in the year 649 AD, was an early partisan of Ali ibn Abu Talib. During the caliphate of Ali, many Hindu Jats of Sindh had come under the influence of Shi'ism and some even participated in the Battle of Camel and died fighting for Ali. According to popular tradition, Islam was brought to Lakshadweep islands, situated just to the west of Malabar Coast, by Ubaidullah in 661 CE.

=== Christianity ===
Christianity in Asia has its roots in the very inception of Christianity, which originated from the life and teachings of Jesus in 1st-century Roman Judea. Christianity then spread through the missionary work of his apostles, first in the Levant and taking roots in the major cities such as Jerusalem and Antioch. According to tradition, further eastward expansion occurred via the preaching of Thomas the Apostle, who established Christianity in the Parthian Empire (Iran) and India. The very First Ecumenical Council was held in the city of Nicaea in Asia Minor (325). The first nations to adopt Christianity as a state religion were Armenia in 301 and Georgia in 327. By the 4th century, Christianity became the dominant religion in all Asian provinces of the Eastern Roman Empire.

After the First Council of Ephesus in 431 and the Nestorian Schism, the Nestorian Christianity developed. Nestorians began converting Mongols around the 7th century, and Nestorian Christianity was probably introduced into China during the Tang dynasty (618–907). Mongols tended to be tolerant of multiple religions, with several Mongol tribes being primarily Christian, and under the leadership of Genghis Khan's grandson, the great khan Möngke, Christianity was a small religious influence of the Mongol Empire in the 13th century.

The Fourth Ecumenical Council was held in Asian city of Chalcedon (451). Christological controversies and disputes that surrounded the Council and its aftermath gradually resulted in division between pro-Chalcedonian (Eastern Orthodox) and anti-Chalcedonian (Oriental Orthodox) Christianity.

At the late 12th and 13th centuries, there was some effort to reunite Eastern and Western Christianity. There were also numerous missionary efforts from Europe to Asia, primarily by Franciscan, Dominican, or Jesuit missionaries. In the 16th century, Spain began to convert Filipinos. In the 18th century, Catholicism developed more or less independently in Korea.

At present, Christianity continues to be the majority religion in the Philippines, East Timor, Armenia, Georgia, Cyprus and Russia. It has significant minority populations in South Korea, Taiwan, China, India, Pakistan, Iran, Indonesia, Vietnam, Singapore, Hong Kong, Japan, Malaysia, Kazakhstan, Kyrgyzstan, Israel, Palestine (including the West Bank and the Gaza Strip), Lebanon, Syria, Iraq, Jordan, and several other countries in Asia with a total Christian population of more than 295 million.

Although Eastern Christianity is commonly practiced in Asia, Roman Catholicism also features prominently, with the Philippines having the world's third-largest Roman Catholic population.

=== Sikhism ===
Sikhism, also known as Sikhi, is an Indian religion and philosophy that originated in the Punjab region of the Indian subcontinent around the end of the 15th century CE. It is one of the most recently founded major religions and is followed by 25–30million adherents, known as Sikhs.

Sikhism developed from the spiritual teachings of Guru Nanak (1469–1539), the faith's first guru, and the nine Sikh gurus who succeeded him. The tenth guru, Guru Gobind Singh (1666–1708), named the Guru Granth Sahib, which is the central religious scripture in Sikhism, as his successor. This brought the line of human gurus to a close. Sikhs regard the Guru Granth Sahib as the 11th and eternally living guru.

The core beliefs and practices of Sikhism, articulated in the Guru Granth Sahib and other Sikh scriptures, include faith and meditation in the name of the one creator (Ik Onkar), the divine unity and equality of all humankind, engaging in selfless service to others (sevā), striving for justice for the benefit and prosperity of all (sarbat da bhala), and honest conduct and livelihood. Following this standard, Sikhism rejects claims that any particular religious tradition has a monopoly on absolute truth. As a consequence, Sikhs do not actively proselytise, although voluntary converts are generally accepted. Sikhism emphasises meditation and remembrance as a means to feel God's presence (simran), which can be expressed musically through kirtan or internally through naam japna (). Baptised Sikhs are obliged to wear the five Ks, which are five articles of faith which physically distinguish Sikhs from non-Sikhs. Among these include the kesh (uncut hair). Most religious Sikh men thus do not cut their hair but rather wear a turban.

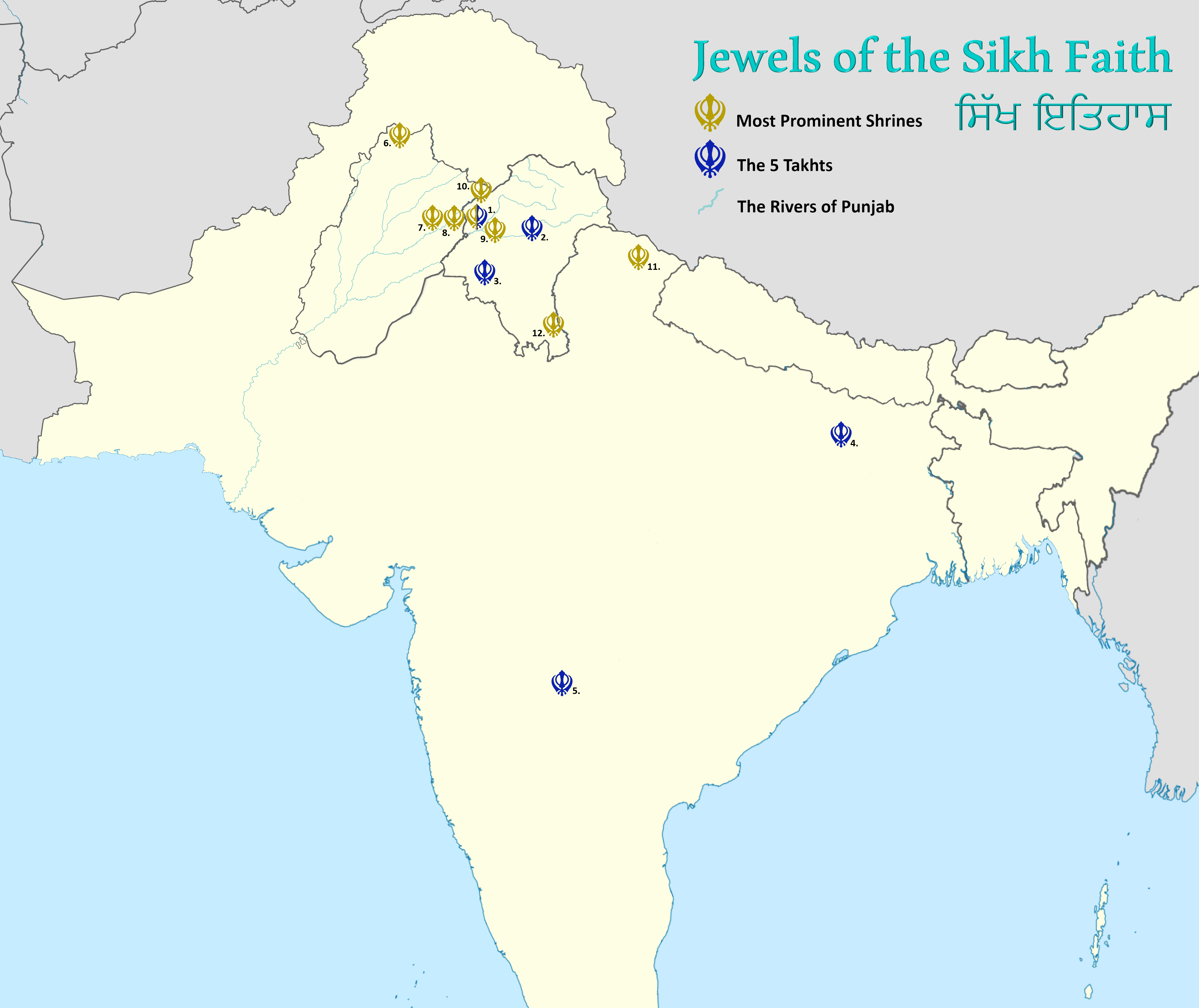
Prominent Sikh shrines:

The religion developed and evolved in times of religious persecution, gaining converts from both Hinduism and Islam. The Mughal emperors of India tortured and executed two of the Sikh gurus—Guru Arjan (1563–1606) and Guru Tegh Bahadur (1621–1675)—after they refused to convert to Islam. The persecution of the Sikhs triggered the founding of the Khalsa by Guru Gobind Singh in 1699 as an order to protect the freedom of conscience and religion, with members expressing the qualities of a sant-sipāhī ("saint-soldier").

=== Buddhism ===
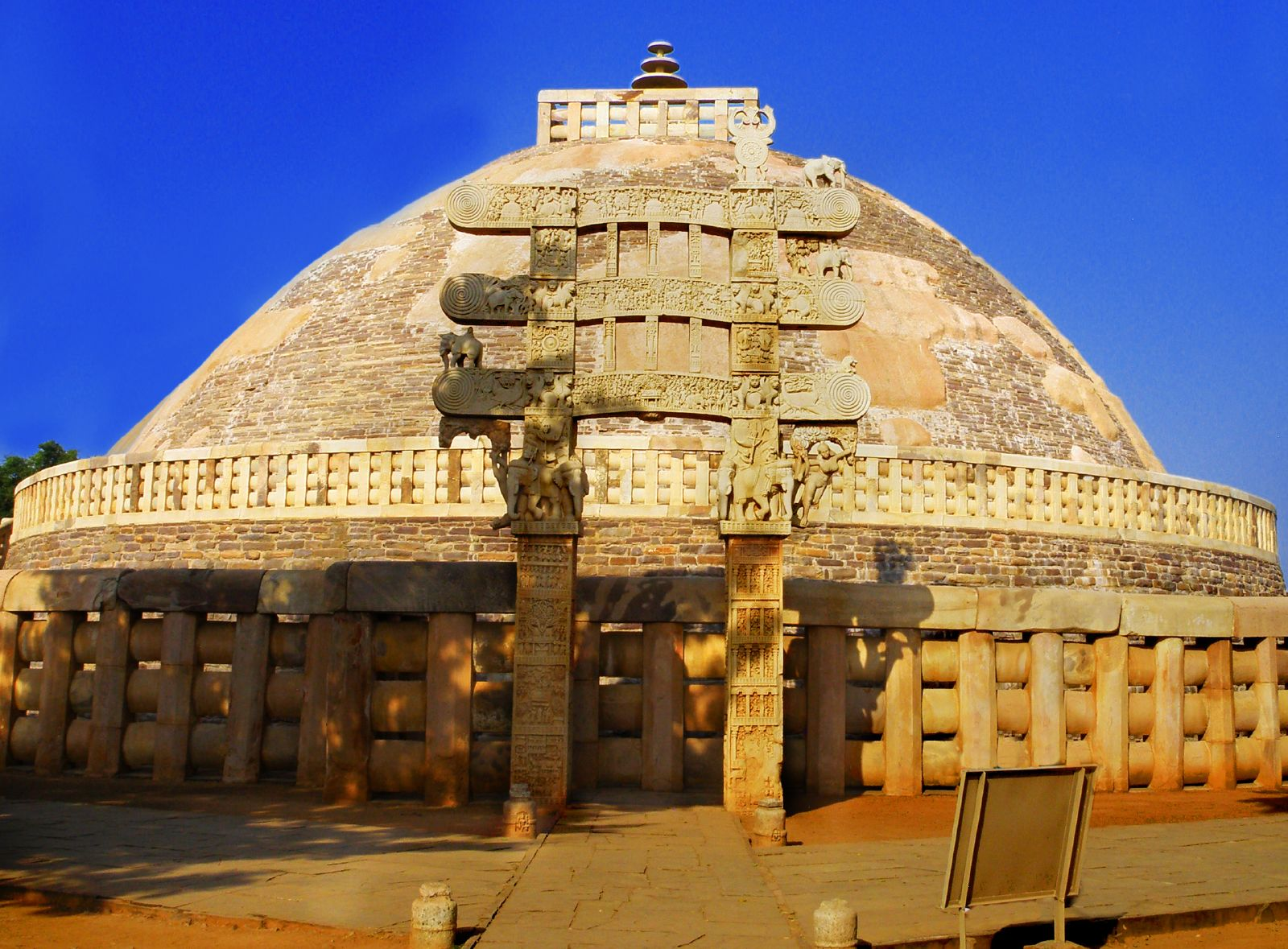
The Great Stupa at Sanchi, located in Sanchi, Madhya Pradesh, is a Buddhist shrine in India built by Ashoka in the 3rd century BCE

Buddhism is an ancient Indian religion and philosophy, which arose in and around the ancient Kingdom of Magadha (now Bihar, India). It is based on the teachings of Gautama Buddha, who lived in the 6th or 5th century BCE and was deemed a "Buddha" or an "Awakened One".

In the 3rd century BCE and during the reign of the Mauryan Emperor Ashoka, the Buddhist community split into two schools: the Mahāsāṃghika and the Sthaviravāda, each of which spread throughout India and grew into numerous sub-schools. In modern times, three major branches of Buddhism exist: the Theravada in Sri Lanka and Southeast Asia, and the Mahayana in the Himalayas and East Asia, and the Vajrayana throughout Asia and specifically in Tibet, Nepal, and Bhutan.

The practice of Buddhism lost influence in India around the 7th century CE, after the collapse of the Gupta Empire. The last large empire to support Buddhism was the Pala Empire, that fell in the 12th century. By the end of the 12th century and after the invasions by the Turkic Muslims, Buddhism had largely disappeared from India with the exception of western and central Tibet and isolated remnants in parts of south India.

Since the 19th century, modern revivals of Buddhism have included the Maha Bodhi Society, the Vipassana movement, and the Dalit Buddhist movement spearheaded by B. R. Ambedkar. There has also been a growth in Tibetan Buddhism with the arrival of Tibetan diaspora and the Tibetan government in exile to India, following the Chinese occupation of Tibet in 1950. According to the 2011 census, there are 8.4 million Buddhists in India (0.70% of the total population).

=== Jainism ===
Jainism ( ), also known as Jain Dharma, is an Indian religion that teaches a path toward spiritual purity and enlightenment through disciplined nonviolence (') to all living creatures. The tradition is spiritually guided by 24 ' (ford-makers), supreme teachers who have conquered the cycle of rebirth and attained omniscience ('). The core of Jain philosophy is established on three ethical pillars: ' (nonviolence), ' (non-absolutism or many-sided reality), and ' (non-possession). While its ultimate spiritual goal is ' (liberation from '), these ethical principles have historically fostered a community renowned for its high literacy, trusted role in commerce, and distinct intellectual culture.

Jain philosophy includes the doctrine of "'", which holds that truth and reality are complex and have multiple aspects, and that no single viewpoint is absolutely complete. This framework encourages intellectual humility and conflict resolution, in contrast to what the tradition terms "one-sided" ("'") views. Ethically, the vow of "'" (non-attachment) requires monks to renounce all property, and encourages laypersons to limit their possessions and desires ("'"). Historically, the application of nonviolence led the Jain community to avoid agriculture and warfare, with many Jains engaging in trade and banking, becoming a mercantile presence in ancient and medieval India. The community supported networks of temples, libraries, and charitable institutions.

The tradition views itself as eternal, with the guiding every cosmic time cycle. In the current cycle, the first ' was Rishabhanatha, credited in tradition with establishing civilized society. The 23rd ', Pārśvanātha, is dated by historians to the , making him likely the tradtion's earliest historical figure. The 24th and final ', Mahavira , was a contemporary of the Buddha and a central figure in the ' movement of Greater Magadha, which rejected the authority of the Vedas and established the current ascetic order.

Jainism has between four and five million followers, known as Jains or Jainas, residing mostly in India, with diaspora communities in North America, Europe, and East Asia. The community is divided into two major sub-traditions, the ' ("sky-clad") and ' ("white-clad"), which differ on ascetic practices, gender, and canonical texts, while sharing a core philosophy. Jains have contributed to the development of logic, art, architecture, law, and ethics in Indian culture. Major festivals include ' or ('), ', ', and '.

=== Zoroastrianism ===
Zoroastrianism, also called Mazdayasna and Behdin, is an Iranian religion centred on the Avesta and the teachings of Zarathushtra Spitama, who is more commonly referred to by the Greek translation, Zoroaster (). Among the world's oldest organized faiths, its adherents exalt an uncreated, benevolent, and all-wise deity known as Ahura Mazda (), who is hailed as the supreme being of the universe.

In the foundational hymns of Zoroastrianism, the Gathas, the primary dualism is ethical and psychological rather than cosmic, centered on the choice between Asha (truth, order, and cosmic progress) and Druj (chaos, distortion, and the lie). Within this early theological framework, Ahura Mazda is the supreme, transcendent Creator who stands above the conflict. The direct opposition exists between the Twin Mentalities (Mainyu): Spenta Mainyu (the progressive, constructive spirit) and Angra Mainyu (the destructive, regressive spirit), both of whom exercised free will at the beginning of creation.

The concept of a strict, symmetrical cosmic dualism—wherein Angra Mainyu (Ahriman) is elevated to a co-equal, primordial adversary of Ahura Mazda himself—is a later development prominent in non-canonical Middle Persian (Pahlavi) texts like the 9th-century Bundahishn. Furthermore, rather than predicting a passive apocalypse where God single-handedly destroys evil, the Gathas emphasize Frashokereti (the "making fresh" or renovation of the world), a collaborative, evolutionary process achieved through the progressive thoughts, words, and actions of humanity.

Opinions vary among scholars as to whether Zoroastrianism is monotheistic, polytheistic, henotheistic, or a combination of all three. Prominent modern Iranologists and linguists heavily reject the flat imposition of 'monotheism' on early Zoroastrianism. Prods Oktor Skjærvø explicitly excludes monotheism, admitting both ethical dualism and polytheism into the Gathic framework. Furthermore, Almut Hintze and Jean Kellens have documented how using Judeo-Christian parameters to label the faith creates a false, inadequate binary, masking the reality of a multi-divinity henotheistic system where other Gods (Yazatas) are naturally revered alongside the supreme Creator.

Originating from Zoroaster's reforms of the ancient Iranian religion, Zoroastrianism began during the Avestan period (possibly as early as the 2nd millennium BCE), but was first recorded in the mid-6th century BCE. For the following millennium, it was the official religion of successive Iranian polities, beginning with the Achaemenid Empire, which formalized and institutionalized many of its tenets and rituals, and ending with the Sasanian Empire, which revitalized the faith and standardized its teachings. In the 7th century CE, the rise of Islam and the ensuing Muslim conquest of Persia marked the beginning of the decline of Zoroastrianism. The persecution of Zoroastrians by the early Muslims in the nascent Rashidun Caliphate prompted much of the community to migrate to the Indian subcontinent, where they were granted asylum and became the progenitors of today's Parsis. Once numbering in the millions, the world's total Zoroastrian population is estimated to comprise between 110,000 and 120,000 people, with most of them residing either in India (50,000–60,000), in Iran (15,000–25,000), or in North America (22,000). Peer-reviewed research has estimated that there are between 145,000 and 2.6 million Zoroastrians globally. Not including self-identification and converts, there are an estimated 130,000 to 140,000 Zoroastrians. The religion is thought to be declining because of restrictions on conversion, strict endogamy, casteism, and low birth rates. The low birth rates are present both among Iranian Zoroastrians and the Parsis.

The central beliefs and practices of Zoroastrianism are contained in the Avesta, a compendium of sacred texts assembled over several centuries. Its oldest and most central component is the Gathas, purported to be the direct teachings of Zoroaster and his account of conversations with Ahura Mazda. These writings are part of a major section of the Avesta called the Yasna, which forms the core of Zoroastrian liturgy. Zoroaster's religious philosophy divided the early Iranian gods of Proto-Indo-Iranian paganism into emanations of the natural world—the ahura and the daeva; the former class consisting of divinities to be revered and the latter class consisting of divinities to be rejected and condemned. Zoroaster proclaimed that Ahura Mazda was the supreme creator and sustaining force of the universe, working in gētīg (the visible material realm) and mēnōg (the invisible spiritual and mental realm) through the Amesha Spenta, a class of seven divine entities that represent various aspects of the universe and the highest moral good. Emanating from Ahura Mazda is Spenta Mainyu (the Holy or Bountiful Spirit), the source of life and goodness, which is opposed by Angra Mainyu (the Destructive or Opposing Spirit), who is born from Aka Manah (evil thought). Angra Mainyu was further developed by Middle Persian literature into Ahriman (), Ahura Mazda's direct adversary. The two terms are synonymous.

Zoroastrian doctrine holds that, within this cosmic dichotomy, human beings have the choice between Asha ('truth', 'cosmic order'), the principle of righteousness or "rightness" that is promoted and embodied by Ahura Mazda, and Druj ('falsehood', 'deceit'), the essential nature of Angra Mainyu that expresses itself as greed, wrath, and envy. Thus, the central moral precepts of the religion are good thoughts (humata), good words (hukhta), and good deeds (huvarshta), which are recited in many prayers and ceremonies. Many of the practices and beliefs of ancient Iranian religion can still be seen in Zoroastrianism, such as reverence for nature and its elements, such as water (aban). Fire (atar) is held by Zoroastrians to be particularly sacred as a symbol of Ahura Mazda himself, serving as a focal point of many ceremonies and rituals, and serving as the basis for Zoroastrian places of worship, which are known as fire temples.

== Religion in South Asian countries ==
Country	Dominant religion	Religious population as a percentage of total population							
Country	Dominant religion	Buddhism	Christianity	Hinduism	Islam	Kiratism	Sikhism	Others	Year reported
Afghanistan	Islam	–	–	–	99.7%	–	–	0.3%	2019
Bangladesh	Islam	0.6%	0.4%	9.5%	90.4%	–	–	–	2011
Bhutan	Vajrayana Buddhism	74.8%	0.5%	22.6%	0.1%	–	–	2%	2010
India	Hinduism	0.7%	2.3%	79.8%	14.2%	–	1.7%	1.3%	2011
Maldives	Sunni Islam	–	–	–	100%	–	–	–	
Nepal	Hinduism	9%	1.3%	81.3%	4.4%	3%	–	0.8%	2013
Pakistan	Islam	–	1.59%	1.85%	96.28%	–	–	0.07%	2010
Sri Lanka	Theravada Buddhism	70.2%	6.2%	12.6%	9.7%	–	–	1.4%	2011

=== Afghanistan ===
Religion in Afghanistan (ARDA 2025)
1. Sunni Islam (88.4%)
2. Shia Islam (11.5%)
3. Other religions (0.14%)

=== Bangladesh ===
Sunni Islam is the largest religion in Bangladesh and in all of its districts, except Rangamati. Hinduism, Buddhism and Christianity are the other major religions in the country. A few people also follow other religions and denominations such as Shia Islam, Ahmadiyya, Sikhism, Bahai Faith, Jainism, Judaism, Zoroastrianism (Parsis), Ravidassia (Ad-Dharmi), as well as animism and folk religions.

=== Bhutan ===
Bhutan is a Buddhist country by constitution and Buddhism plays a vital role in the country.

=== Nepal ===
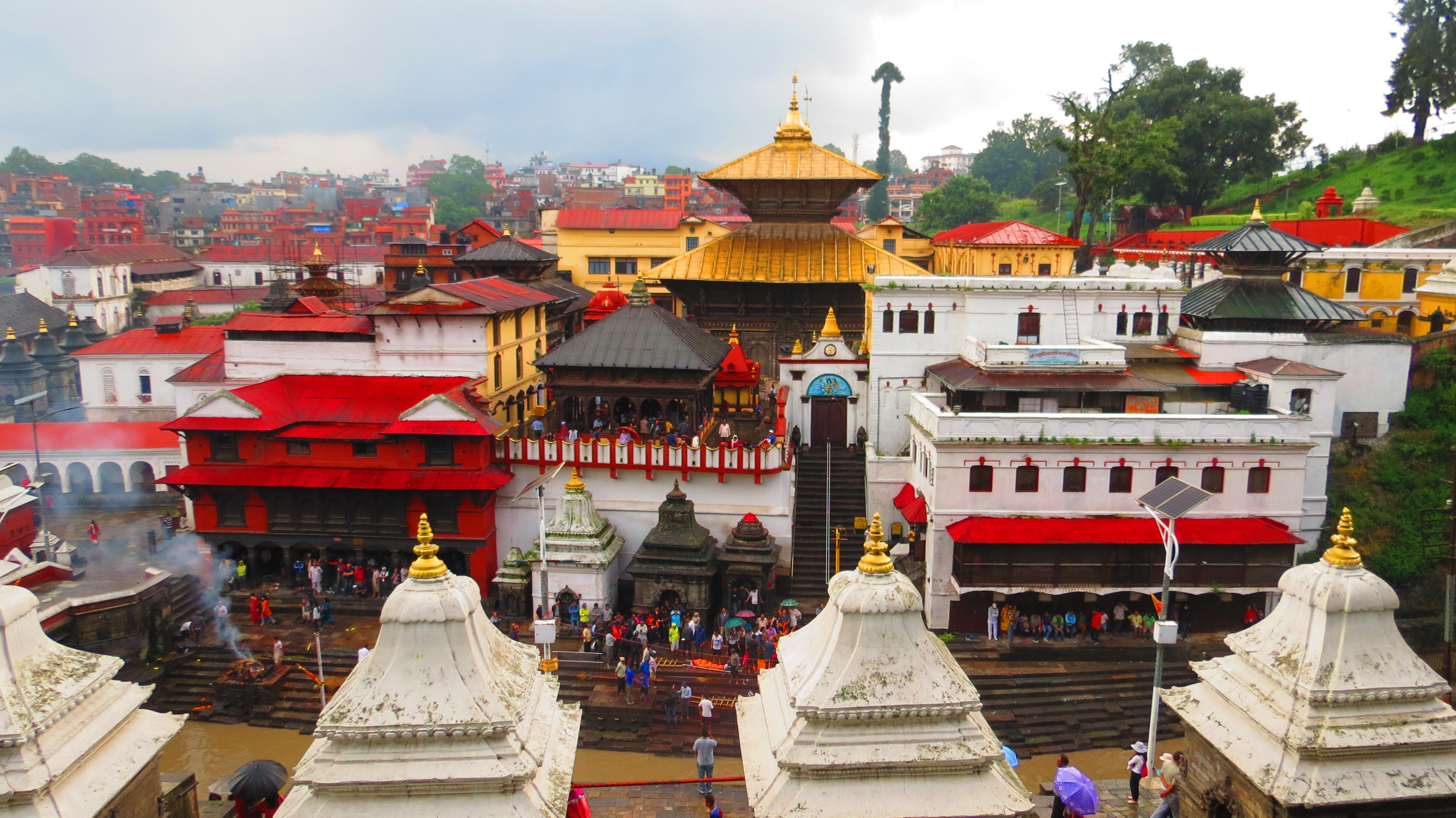
Pashupatinath Temple in the capital Kathmandu is a World Heritage Site.

Religion in Nepal encompasses a wide diversity of groups and beliefs. Nepal is a Hindu-majority country and secularism in Nepal under the Interim constitution (Part 1, Article 4) is defined as "Religious and cultural freedom along with the protection of religion and culture handed down from time immemorial." That is, The state government is bound for protecting and fostering Hindu religion while maintaining "Religious" and "Cultural" freedom throughout the nation as fundamental rights.

=== Sri Lanka ===
Sri Lanka is officially a Buddhist country, however Sri Lankans practice a variety of religions. As of the 2024 census, 69.8% of Sri Lankans were Buddhists (mostly Theravada), 12.6% were Hindus, 10.7% were Muslims (mainly Sunni), 7.6% were Christians (mostly Catholics). Buddhism is declared as the state religion of Sri Lanka and receives special privileges in the Sri Lankan constitution, such as mandatory protection and nationwide propagation by the government. However, the constitution also provides for freedom of religion and the right to equality among citizens. In 2008, a Gallup poll ranked Sri Lanka the third most religious country in the world with 99% of Sri Lankans saying that religion was an important part of their daily life.

== Caste system ==
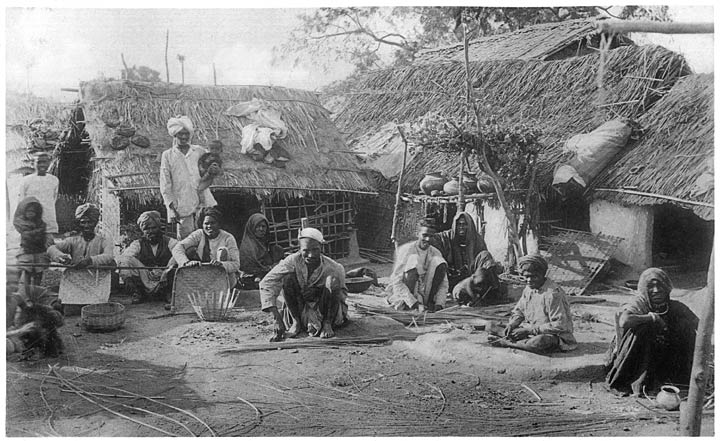
The Basor weaving bamboo baskets in a 1916 book. The Basor are a Scheduled Caste found in the state of Uttar Pradesh in India.

A caste is a fixed social group into which an individual is born within a particular system of social stratification: a caste system. Within such a system, individuals are expected to marry exclusively within the same caste (endogamy), follow lifestyles often linked to a particular occupation, hold a ritual status observed within a hierarchy, and interact with others based on cultural notions of exclusion, with certain castes considered as either more pure or more polluted than others. The term "caste" is also applied to morphological groupings in eusocial insects such as ants, bees, and termites.

The paradigmatic ethnographic example of caste is the division of India's Hindu society into rigid social groups. Its roots lie in South Asia's ancient history, and it still persists. A subject of much scholarship by sociologists and anthropologists, the Hindu caste system is sometimes used as an analogical basis for the study of caste-like social divisions existing outside Hinduism and India. In colonial Spanish America, mixed-race castas were a category within the Hispanic sector but the social order was otherwise fluid.

=== Indian caste system ===
In India, social classification based on caste has its origin in ancient times. It was transformed by various ruling elites in medieval, early-modern, and modern India, especially in the aftermath of the collapse of the Mughal Empire and the establishment of the British Raj. Caste is traditionally associated with Hinduism, but is more pervasive in extent: an estimated 98% of contemporary Indians, including Hindus, Muslims, Christians, Sikhs, Buddhists, and Jains, identify with a caste.

Beginning in ancient India, the caste system was originally centered around varna, with Brahmins (priests) and, to a lesser extent, Kshatriyas (rulers and warriors) serving as the elite classes, followed by Vaishyas (traders and merchants) and finally Shudras (labourers). Outside of this system are the oppressed, marginalised, and persecuted Dalits (also known as "Untouchables") and Adivasis (tribals). Over time, the system became increasingly rigid, and the emergence of jati led to further entrenchment, introducing thousands of new castes and sub-castes. With the arrival of Islamic rule, caste-like distinctions were formulated in certain Muslim communities, primarily in North India. The British Raj furthered the system, through census classifications and preferential treatment to Christians and people belonging to certain castes. Social unrest during the 1920s led to a change in this policy towards affirmative action.

=== Social stratification among Muslims ===
Muslim communities in South Asia have a system of social stratification arising from concepts other than "pure" and "impure", which are integral to the caste system in India. It developed as a result of relations among foreign conquerors, local upper-caste Hindus convert to Islam (ashraf, also known as tabqa-i ashrafiyya) and local lower-caste converts (ajlaf), as well as the continuation of the Indian caste system by converts. Non-ashrafs are backward-caste converts. The concept of "pasmanda" includes ajlaf and arzal Muslims; ajlaf status is defined by descent from converts to Islam and by Birth (profession). These terms are not part of the sociological vocabulary in regions such as Kashmir and Uttar Pradesh, and say little about the functioning of Muslim society.

The Baradari system is social stratification in Pakistan and, to an extent, India. The South Asian Muslim caste system includes hierarchical classifications of khandan (dynasty, family, or lineage).

== Religious nationalism ==
=== Hindu nationalism ===
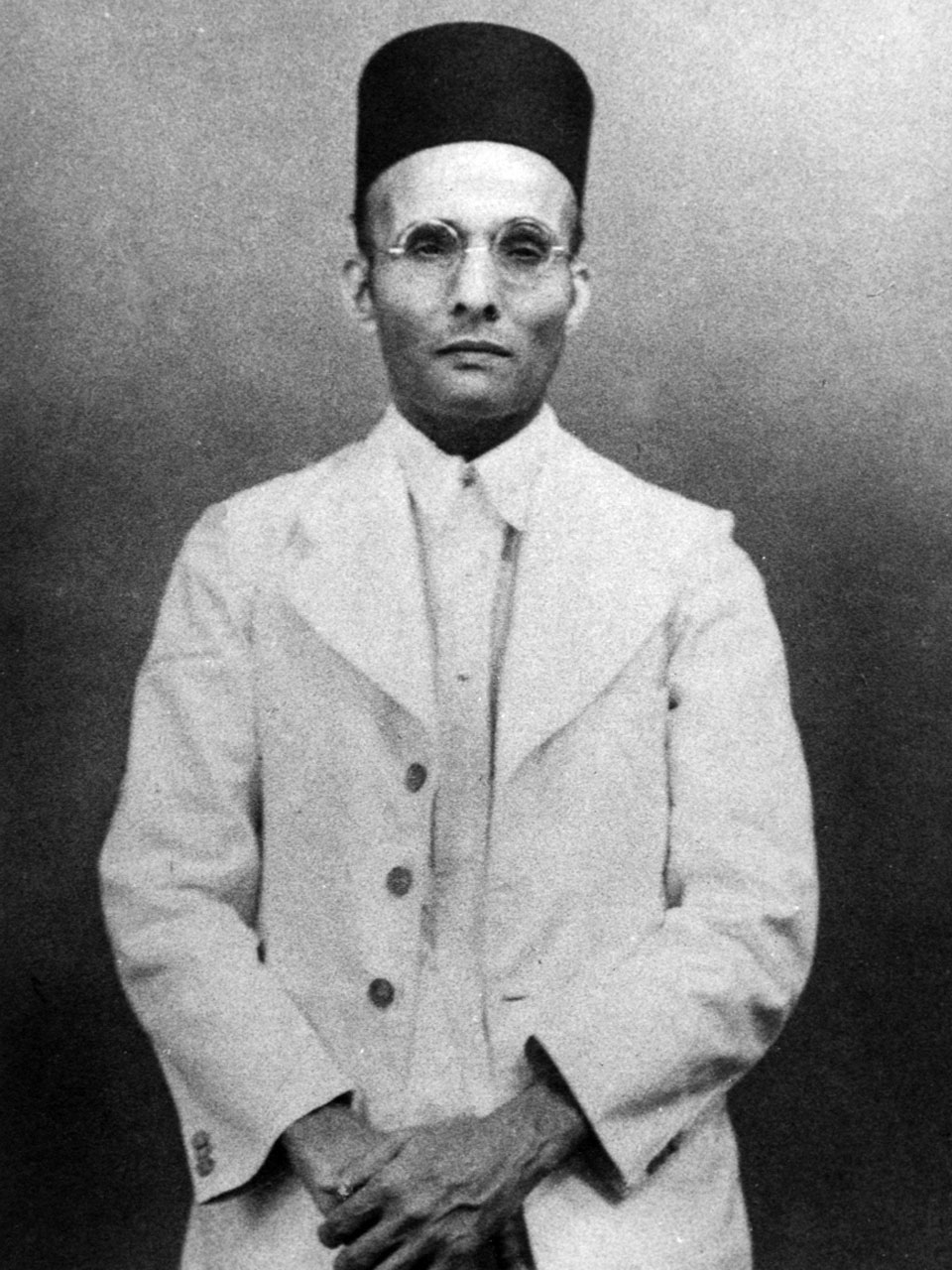
Vinayak Damodar Savarkar, the founder of Hindutva

Hindutva (Note: /hɪnˈdʊtvə/; transl. Hindu-ness) is a Hindu nationalist political ideology. Formulated by Vinayak Damodar Savarkar in Essentials of Hindutva in 1923, it is primarily espoused by the Rashtriya Swayamsevak Sangh (RSS), the Vishva Hindu Parishad (VHP), the ruling Bharatiya Janata Party (BJP), and other organisations collectively known as the Sangh Parivar.

Borrowing ideas and concepts from European fascism, the Hindutva movement engaged in a mutually beneficial relationship with Fascist Italy and Nazi Germany during the interwar period and the Second World War. Hindutva has been described as a variant of right-wing extremism and as "almost fascist in the classical sense", adhering to a concept of homogenised majority and cultural hegemony. Some analysts dispute the identification of Hindutva with fascism and suggest that Hindutva is an extreme form of conservatism or ethnic nationalism.

Proponents of Hindutva, particularly its early ideologues, have used political rhetoric and sometimes misinformation to justify the idea of a Hindu state. This movement has often been criticised for misusing Hindu religious sentiments to divide people along communal lines and for distorting the inclusive and pluralistic nature of Hinduism for political gains.

=== Muslim nationalism ===
From a historical perspective, Professor Ishtiaq Ahmed of the Stockholm University and Professor Shamsul Islam of the University of Delhi classified the Muslims of Colonial India into two categories during the era of the Indian independence movement: nationalist Muslims (Indian Muslims who opposed the partition of India and aligned with Indian nationalism) and Muslim nationalists (individuals who desired to create a separate country for Indian Muslims). The All India Azad Muslim Conference represented nationalist Muslims, while the All-India Muslim League represented the Muslim nationalists. One such popular debate was the Madani–Iqbal debate.

=== Sikh nationalism ===
The proposed flag of Khalistan is often used as a symbol of the Khalistan movement.

The Khalistan movement is a separatist movement seeking to create a homeland for Sikhs by establishing an ethnoreligious sovereign state called Khalistan (Note: Also known as Sikhistan from the 1940s to 1970s.) (lit. 'land of the Khalsa') in the Punjab region. The proposed boundaries of Khalistan vary between different groups; some suggest the entirety of the Sikh-majority Indian state of Punjab, while larger claims include Pakistani Punjab and other parts of North India, such as Chandigarh, Haryana, and Himachal Pradesh.

The call for a separate Sikh state began during the 1930s, when British rule in India was nearing its end. In 1940, the first explicit call for Khalistan was made in a pamphlet titled "Khalistan". In the 1940s, a demand for a Sikh country called "Sikhistan" arose. With financial and political support from the Sikh diaspora, the movement flourished in the Indian state of Punjab—which has a Sikh-majority population—continuing through the 1970s and 1980s, and reaching its zenith in the late 1980s. The Sikh separatist leader Jagjit Singh Chohan said that during his talks with Zulfikar Ali Bhutto, who served as president and prime minister of Pakistan, the latter affirmed his support for the Khalistan movement in retaliation for the 1971 Indo-Pakistan war, which resulted in the secession of Bangladesh from Pakistan.

The insurgency in Punjab started in the early 1980s after 1978 Sikh–Nirankari clash. Several pro-Khalistan groups were involved in the armed insurgency, including Babbar Khalsa and the Khalistan Commando Force, among others. In 1986, the Khalistan Commando Force took responsibility for the assassination of General Arun Vaidya in retaliation for 1984's Operation Blue Star. By the mid-1990s, the insurgency petered out, with the last major incident being the assassination of Chief Minister Beant Singh, who was killed in a bomb blast by a member of Babbar Khalsa. The movement failed to reach its objective for multiple reasons, including violent police crackdowns on separatists, factional infighting, and disillusionment from the Sikh population.

There is some support within India and the Sikh diaspora, with yearly demonstrations in protest of those killed during Operation Blue Star. In early 2018, some militant groups were arrested by police in Punjab, India. Former Chief Minister of Punjab Amarinder Singh claimed that the recent extremism is backed by Pakistan's Inter-Services Intelligence (ISI) and "Khalistani sympathisers" in Canada, Italy, and the UK. Shiromani Akali Dal (Amritsar) is currently the only pro-Khalistan party recognised by the Election Commission of India. As of 2024, two seats in the Indian Parliament are held by Amritpal Singh, an incarcerated pro-Khalistan activist, and Sarabjeet Singh Khalsa, who is the son of the assassin of former prime minister Indira Gandhi.

== See also ==
- Religion in Asia

== Works cited ==
- Asher, Catherine B.; Talbot, Cynthia (2006), India Before Europe, Cambridge University Press, ISBN 978-0-521-80904-7
- Bayly, Susan (2001), Caste, Society and Politics in India from the Eighteenth Century to the Modern Age, Cambridge University Press, ISBN 978-0-521-26434-1
- de Zwart, Frank (July 2000), "The Logic of Affirmative Action: Caste, Class and Quotas in India", Acta Sociologica, 43 (3): 235–249, doi:10.1177/000169930004300304, JSTOR 4201209, S2CID 220432103
- Delage, Remy (29 September 2014), "Muslim Castes in India", Books & Ideas, College De France
- Dirks, Nicholas B. (2001b), "Discriminating Difference: The Postcolonial Politics of Caste in India", in Burguière, André; Grew, Raymond (eds.), The Construction of Minorities: Cases for Comparison Across Time and Around the World, University of Michigan Press, ISBN 978-0-472-06737-4
- Eaton, Richard (1985), "Approaches to the Study of Conversion to Islam in India", in Richard C. Martin (ed.), Approaches to Islam in Religious Studies (1st ed.), Tucson: University of Arizona PressB, pp. 107–123
- Eaton, Richard Maxwell (1993), The Rise of Islam and the Bengal Frontier, 1204-1760, University of California Press, ISBN 978-0-520-08077-5
- Frykenberg, Robert (2008). "Hindutva as a Political Religion: An Historical Perspective". In R. Griffin; R. Mallett and J. Tortorice (eds.). The Sacred in Twentieth-Century Politics: Essays in Honour of Professor Stanley G. Payne. Palgrave Macmillan UK. pp. 178–200. ISBN 978-0-230-24163-3.
- Hardy, Peter (1972), The Muslims of British India, Cambridge University Press, ISBN 978-0-521-09783-3
- Jalal, Ayesha; Bose, Sugata (1998), Modern South Asia: History, Culture, Political Economy (1st ed.), Sang-e-Meel Publications
- Jalal, Ayesha (2014), The Struggle for Pakistan: A Muslim Homeland and Global Politics, Harvard University Press, ISBN 978-0-674-05289-5
- Khanam, Azra (2013), Muslim Backward Classes: A Sociological Perspective, SAGE, ISBN 978-81-321-1650-9
- Krishna, Ananth V. (2011). India since Independence: Making Sense of Indian Politics. Pearson Education India. ISBN 978-8131734650.
- Kugle, Scott A. (2004), "Islam in South Asia", in Richard C. Martin (ed.), Encyclopedia of Islam and the Muslim World: M-Z, index, Macmillan Reference USA, pp. 634–641, ISBN 978-0-02-865605-2
- Kulke, Hermanne (1998), A History of India (3rd ed.), Routledge, ISBN 978-0-415-15482-6
- Levesque, Julien (2020), Debates on Muslim Caste in North India and Pakistan, HAL
- Ludden, David (2002), India and South Asia: A Short History, Oneworld, ISBN 978-1-85168-237-9
- Maddison, Angus (2007), Contours of the World Economy 1-2030 AD: Essays in Macro-Economic History, Oxford University Press, ISBN 978-1-4008-3138-8
- Meyendorff, John (1989). Imperial unity and Christian divisions: The Church 450–680 A.D. The Church in history. Vol. 2. Crestwood, NY: St. Vladimir's Seminary Press. ISBN 9780881410556.
- Metcalf, Barbara D.; Metcalf, Thomas R. (2002), A Concise History of India, Cambridge University Press, ISBN 978-0-521-63974-3
- Metcalf, Barbara D. (2009), Islam in South Asia in Practice, Princeton University Press, ISBN 978-1-4008-3138-8
- Muzaffar Alam; Phillip B. Calkins. "North India under Muslim hegemony, c. 1200–1526". India. Encyclopedia Britannica.
- Robb, Peter (2002), A History of India (1st ed.), Palgrave, ISBN 978-0-333-69129-8
- Robinson, Francis (2010), "South Asia to 1919", The Islamic World in the Age of Western Dominance, The New Cambridge History of Islam, vol. 5, Cambridge University Press, pp. 212–239, ISBN 978-1-316-17578-1
- Sathaye, Adheesh A. (17 April 2015), Crossing the Lines of Caste: Visvamitra and the Construction of Brahmin Power in Hindu Mythology, Oxford University Press, ISBN 978-0-19-027312-5
- Shah, Mehtab Ali (1997), The Foreign Policy of Pakistan: Ethnic Impacts on Diplomacy 1971–1994, I.B.Tauris, ISBN 978-1-86064-169-5
- St. John, Ian (2012), The Making of the Raj: India Under the East India Company, ABC-CLIO, ISBN 978-1-84645-014-3
- Stein, Burton (1998), A History of India (1st ed.), Blackwell Publishers, ISBN 978-0-631-20546-3
- Talbot, Ian; Singh, Gurharpal (2009), The Partition of India, Cambridge University Press, ISBN 978-0-521-85661-4
- Talbot, Ian (2016), A History of Modern South Asia: Politics, States, Diasporas, Yale University Press, ISBN 978-0-300-21659-2
- Van Dyke, Virginia (2009), "The Khalistan Movement in Punjab, India, and the Post-Militancy Era: Structural Change and New Political Compulsions", Asian Survey, 49 (6): 975–997, doi:10.1525/as.2009.49.6.975
