= 2024 Indian general election in Lakshadweep =

Indian general election held in Lakshadweep

← 2019	19 April 2024	2029 →

Sole seat from Lakshadweep in the Lok Sabha
- Opinion polls
- Turnout: 84.16% (▼1.05 pp)

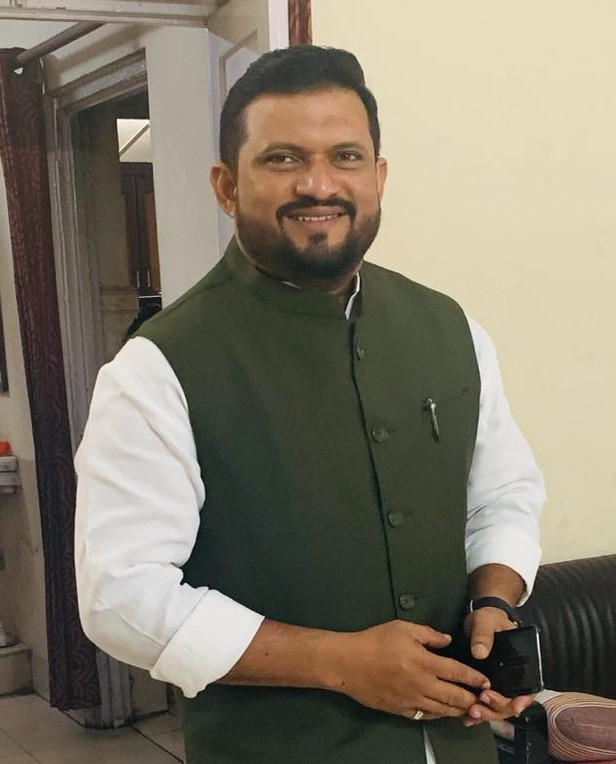
	First party	Second party
Leader	Muhammed Hamdulla Sayeed	Mohammed Faizal Padippura
Party	INC	NCP(SP)
Alliance	INDIA	INDIA
Leader since	2009	2019
Last election	46.86%, 0 seat	48.61%, 1 seat (NCP)
Seats won	1	0
Seat change	▲1	▼1
Popular vote	25,726	23,079
Percentage	52.29%	46.91%
Swing	▲4.43 pp	▼1.7 pp
- Lakshadweep Lok Sabha constituency
Prime Minister before election
Narendra Modi
BJP
Prime Minister after election
Narendra Modi
BJP

The 2024 Indian general election was held in Lakshadweep on 19 April 2024 to elect 1 member of the 18th Lok Sabha.

== Election schedule ==
Poll event	Phase
Poll event	I
Notification date	20 March 2024
Last date for filing nomination	27 March 2024
Scrutiny of nomination	28 March 2024
Last Date for withdrawal of nomination	30 March 2024
Date of poll	19 April 2024
Date of counting of votes/Result	4 June 2024
No. of constituencies	1

== Parties and alliances ==
=== Nationalist Congress Party – Sharadchandra Pawar ===
Nationalist Congress Party – Sharadchandra Pawar

Party	Flag	Symbol	Leader	Seats contested
Nationalist Congress Party – Sharadchandra Pawar			Mohammed Faizal Padippura	1

=== Indian National Congress ===
Indian National Congress

Party	Flag	Symbol	Leader	Seats contested
Indian National Congress			Muhammed Hamdulla Sayeed	1

=== National Democratic Alliance ===
National Democratic Alliance

Party	Flag	Symbol	Leader	Seats contested
Nationalist Congress Party			Yusuf T.P.	1

== Candidates ==
Constituency							
Constituency		INDIA				NDA	
1	Lakshadweep	NCP(SP)	Mohammed Faizal Padippura	INC	Muhammed Hamdulla Sayeed	NCP	Yusuf T.P.

== Surveys and polls ==
=== Opinion polls ===
Polling agency	Date published	Margin of error				Lead
Polling agency	Date published	Margin of error	NDA	INDIA	Others	Lead
ABP News-CVoter	March 2024	±5%	0	1	0	INDIA
India Today-CVoter	December 2023	±3-5%	0	1	0	INDIA
Times Now-ETG	December 2023	±3%	0	1	0	INDIA
India TV-CNX	October 2023	±3%	0	1	0	INDIA
Times Now-ETG	September 2023	±3%	0	1	0	INDIA
Times Now-ETG	August 2023	±3%	0	1	0	INDIA

Polling agency	Date published	Margin of error				Lead
Polling agency	Date published	Margin of error	NDA	INDIA	Others	Lead
ABP News-CVoter	March 2024	±5%	4%	95%	1%	91

=== Exit polls ===
Polling agency				Lead
Polling agency	NDA	INDIA	Others	Lead
Actual results	0	1	0	INDIA

== Results ==
=== Results by alliance or party ===
Alliance/ Party		Popular vote			Seats		
Alliance/ Party		Votes	%	±pp	Contested	Won	+/−
INDIA	INC	25,726	52.29%	▲4.43	1	1	▲1
INDIA	NCP(SP)	23,079	46.91%	new	1	0	Steady
NDA	NCP	201	0.41%	▼48.2	1	0	▼1
IND		61	0.12%		1	0	Steady
NOTA		133	0.27%	▲0.06%			
Total		49,200	100%	-	4	1	-

=== Results by constituency ===
Constituency		Turnout	Winner					Runner-up					Margin
Constituency		Turnout	Party	Alliance	Candidate	Votes	%	Party	Alliance	Candidate	Votes	%	Margin
1	Lakshadweep	84.16%▼	INC	INDIA	Muhammed Hamdulla Sayeed	25,726	52.29%	NCP-SP	INDIA	Mohammed Faizal Padippura	23,079	46.91%	2,647

== See also ==
- 2024 Indian general election in Madhya Pradesh
- 2024 Indian general election in Maharashtra
- 2024 Indian general election in Manipur
