= Islam in South Asia =

Overview of Islam in South Asia

Muslims in South Asia
- Muslim population of South Asia by district

Total population
- c. 652.8 million (2023) (35% of the population) ▲

Regions with significant populations
- Pakistan: 243,530,000 (2024)
- India: 200,000,000 (2021)
- Bangladesh: 150,400,000 (2022)
- Afghanistan: 41,128,771 (2022)
- Sri Lanka: 2,337,380 (2024)
- Nepal: 1,483,066 (2021)
- Maldives: 560,000 (2021)
- Bhutan: 1,500 (2010)

Languages
- Arabic (Sacred), languages of South Asia

Muslim population by country, 2020.svg (description page)

Islam is the second-largest religion in South Asia after Hinduism, with more than 650 million Muslims living there, forming about one-third of the region's population. Islam first spread along the coastal regions of the Indian subcontinent and Sri Lanka, almost as soon as it started in the Arabian Peninsula, as the Arab traders brought it to South Asia. South Asia has the largest population of Muslims in the world, with about one-third of all Muslims living here. Islam is the dominant religion in half of the South Asian countries (Pakistan, Maldives, Bangladesh and Afghanistan). It is the second largest religion in India and third largest in Sri Lanka and Nepal.

On the Indian subcontinent, Islam first appeared in the southwestern tip of the peninsula, in today's Kerala state. Arabs traded with Malabar even before the birth of Prophet Muhammad. Native legends say that a group of Sahaba, under Malik ibn Dinar, arrived on the Malabar Coast and preached Islam. Local kings who converted to Islam existed in places such as the Western Coastal Plains as early as the 7th century. According to that legend, the first mosque of India was built by the mandate of the last King of Chera Perumals of Makotai, who accepted Islam and received the name Tajudheen during the lifetime of the Islamic prophet Muhammad (c. 570–632). Historically, the Barwada Mosque in Ghogha, Gujarat built before 623 CE, Cheraman Juma Mosque (629 CE) in Methala, Kerala and Palaiya Jumma Palli (630 CE) in Kilakarai, Tamil Nadu are three of the first mosques in South Asia.

The first incursion occurred through sea by Caliph Umar's governor of Bahrain, Usman ibn Abu al-Aas, who sent his brother Hakam ibn Abu al-Aas to raid and reconnoitre the Makran region around 636 or 643 before any Arab army reached the frontier of India by land. First battle with king of Sind, the battle of Makran, took place in 644. During the caliphate of Ali, many Jats of Sindh had come under the influence of Shi'ism with some participating in the Battle of Camel and fighting for Ali. According to popular tradition, Islam was brought to Lakshadweep islands, situated just to the west of Malabar Coast, by Ubaidullah in 661 CE.

== Early contacts ==
=== Sea trade and arrival of Islam in South India ===
Names, routes and locations of the Periplus of the Erythraean Sea (1st century CE)

Trade relations have existed between Arabia and the Indian subcontinent since ancient times. Even in the pre-Islamic era, Arab traders used to visit the Konkan-Gujarat coast and Malabar Coast, which linked them with the ports of Southeast Asia. Through their extensive trade and commerce networks, Arab merchants and traders became key ambassadors of the faith, shared its teachings wherever they traveled. Historical evidence shows that Arabs and Muslims interacted with Indians from the early days of Islam and possibly before the arrival of Islam in Arab regions. Arab traders transmitted the numeral system developed by Indians to the Middle East and Europe.

Commercial intercourse between Arabia and India had gone on from time immemorial, with for example the sale of dates and aromatic herbs by Arabs traders who came to Indian shores every spring with the advent of the monsoon breeze. People living on the western coast of India were as familiar with the annual coming of Arab traders as they were with the flocks of monsoon birds; they were as ancient a phenomenon as the monsoon itself. However, whereas monsoon birds flew back to Africa after a sojourn of few months, not all traders returned to their homes in the desert; many married Indian women and settled in India.

Islamic influence first came to be felt in the Indian subcontinent during the early 7th century with the advent of Arab traders. Unlike the coasts of Malabar, the northwestern coasts were not as receptive to the Middle Eastern arrivals. Hindu merchants in Sindh and Gujarat perceived the Arab merchants to be competitors. Historians Elliot and Dowson say in their book The History of India, as Told by Its Own Historians, that the first ship bearing Muslim travellers was seen on the Indian coast as early as 630 CE. H. G. Rawlinson in his book Ancient and Medieval History of India claims that the first Arab Muslims settled on the Indian coast in the last part of the 7th century CE. This fact is corroborated by J. Sturrock in his Madras District Manuals and by Haridas Bhattacharya in Cultural Heritage of India Vol. IV.

On a similar note, Malabar Muslims on the western coast also claim that they converted to Islam in Muhammad's lifetime. According to Qissat Shakarwati Farmad, the Masjids at Kodungallur, Kollam, Madayi, Barkur, Mangalore, Kasaragod, Kannur, Dharmadam, Panthalayini, and Chaliyam, were built during the era of Malik Dinar, and they are among the oldest Masjids (mosques) in the Indian Subcontinent.

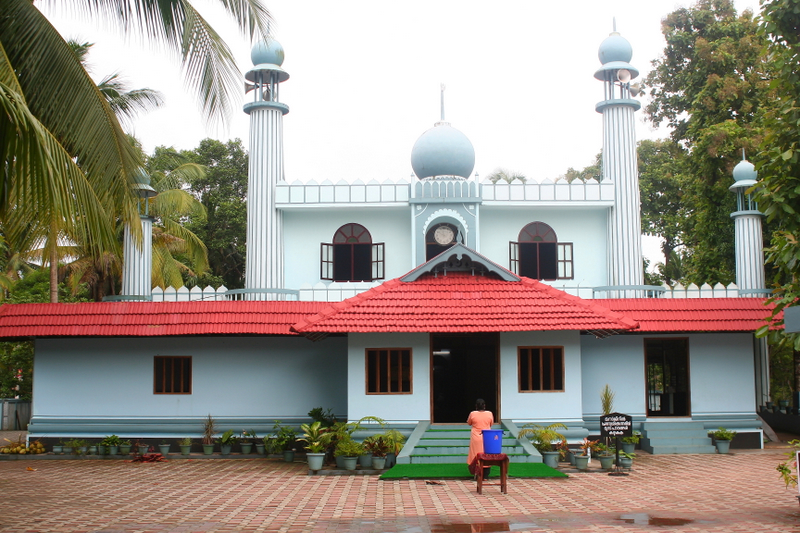
Cheraman Perumal Juma Masjid on the Malabar Coast, probably the first Mosque in India

According to popular tradition, Islam was brought to Lakshadweep islands, situated just to the west of Malabar Coast, by Ubaidullah in 661 CE. His grave is believed to be located on the island of Andrott. According to Kerala Muslim tradition, the Masjid Zeenath Baksh at Mangalore is one of the oldest mosques in the Indian subcontinent. According to the Legend of Cheraman Perumals, the first Indian mosque was built in 624 CE at Kodungallur in present-day Kerala with the mandate of the last the ruler (the Cheraman Perumal) of Chera dynasty, who converted to Islam during the lifetime of the Islamic prophet Muhammad (c. 570–632).

The first Indian mosque, Cheraman Juma Mosque, is thought to have been built in 629 CE by Malik Deenar although some historians say the first mosque was in Gujarat in between 610 and 623 CE. In Malabar, the Mappilas may have been the first community to convert to Islam. It is believed that Malik Dinar died at Thalangara in Kasaragod town.

The advent of Muhammad (569–632 CE) transformed the previously idolatrous and fragmented Arabs into a nation unified by faith and driven by a shared commitment to spreading the message of Islam. Arab merchant seamen, who had long brought goods like dates to South India, now introduced the new religion, which found a warm reception in the region. South Indian communities welcomed the construction of mosques and facilitated cultural integration, including intermarriage between Arabs and local women. This led to the formation of a distinct Indian-Arabian Muslim community. By the early 9th century, Muslim missionaries in Malabar achieved a significant milestone when they inspired the conversion of the local king to Islam.

=== Islam in Makran and Indus Valley ===
According to historian Derryl N. Maclean, early connections between Sindh (in present-day Pakistan) and the Shia supporters of Ali can be traced to Hakim ibn Jabalah al-Abdi. A companion of Muhammad, Hakim traveled through Sind to Makran in 649 CE, reporting on the region to the Caliph. A devoted supporter of Ali, Hakim died in the Battle of the Camel alongside Jats, known to Arabs as Zuṭṭ. He was also a poet and few couplets of his poem in praise of Ali ibn Abu Talib have survived, as reported in Chachnama. (Note: Hakim ibn Jabalah al-Abdi's poem in praise of Ali ibn Abu Talib: (Arabic: ليس الرزيه بالدينار نفقدة ان الرزيه فقد العلم والحكم وأن أشرف من اودي الزمان به أهل العفاف و أهل الجود والكريم "Oh Ali, owing to your alliance (with the prophet) you are truly of high birth, and your example is great, and you are wise and excellent, and your advent has made your age an age of generosity and kindness and brotherly love".)

During Ali's leadership, numerous Jats in Sind embraced Islam, influenced by the efforts of figures like Harith ibn Murrah al-Abdi and Sayfi ibn Fil' al-Shaybani, officers in Ali’s army. In 658 CE, they led campaigns against Sindhi bandits, pursuing them as far as Al-Qiqan (modern-day Quetta).

== Spread of Islam ==
The Islamic ambitions of the sultans and Mughals had concentrated in expanding Muslim power and looting, not in seeking converts. Evidence of the absence of systematic programs for conversion is the reason for the concentration of South Asia's Muslim populations outside the main core of the Muslim polities in the northeast and northwest regions of the subcontinent, which were on the peripheries of Muslim states.

The Sufis did not preach egalitarianism, but played an important role in integrating agricultural settlements with the larger contemporary cultures. In areas where Sufis received grants and supervised clearing of forestry, they had the role of mediating with worldly and divine authority. Richard M. Eaton has described the significance of this in the context of West Punjab and East Bengal, the two main areas to develop Muslim majorities. The 1947 partition was eventually made possible because of the concentration of Muslim majorities in northwest and northeast India. The overwhelming majority of the subcontinent's Muslims live in regions which became Pakistan in 1947.

These nominal conversions to Islam, brought about by regional Muslim polities, were followed by reforms, especially after the 17th century, in which Muslims integrated with the larger Muslim world. Improved transport services in the nineteenth century brought Muslim masses into contact with Mecca, which facilitated reformist movements stressing Quranic literalism and making people aware of the differences between Islamic commands and their actual practices.

Islamic reformist movements, such as the Faraizi movement, in the nineteenth century rural Bengal aimed to remove indigenous folk practices from Bengali Islam and commit the population exclusively to Allah and Muhammad. Politically the reform aspect of conversion, emphasizing exclusiveness, continued with the Pakistan movement for a separate Muslim state and a cultural aspect was the assumption of Arab culture.

== Demographics ==
Muslim Percentage by Country
Country	Percent
Maldives	100%
Afghanistan	99.9%
Pakistan	96.5%
Bangladesh	91.04%
India	14.12%
Sri Lanka	10.7%
Nepal	5.1%
Bhutan	0.2%

Pakistan, Bangladesh, Afghanistan, and the Maldives are Muslim-majority countries. Pakistan, which later split into Pakistan and Bangladesh in 1971, emerging as the primary Muslim-majority countries in the region. Muslim population in India is 14.12%, which still makes it the largest Muslim population outside the Muslim-majority countries.

== See also ==
- History of Islam
- Islam by country
- Islam in Southeast Asia
- Islam in Central Asia

By country

- Islam in India
- Islam in Pakistan
- Islam in Bangladesh
- Islam in Afghanistan
- Islam in Sri Lanka
- Islam in the Maldives
- Islam in Nepal
- Islam in Bhutan

Related to Muslim community

- Chaand Raat
- Muslim period in the Indian subcontinent
- Muslim conquests in the Indian subcontinent
- Caste system among South Asian Muslims
- Muslim nationalism in South Asia
