= P. M. Sayeed =

Indian politician

Padanatha Mohammed Sayeed
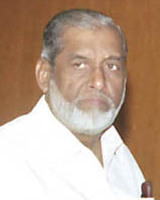

Union Minister of Power
- In office 22 May 2004 – 18 December 2005
- Preceded by: Anant Geete
- Succeeded by: Sushilkumar Shinde
- Constituency: New Delhi

Member of Parliament, Rajya Sabha
- In office 10 August 2004 – 18 December 2005
- Constituency: New Delhi

12th Deputy Speaker of the Lok Sabha
- In office 17 December 1998 – 6 February 2004
- Speaker: G. M. C. Balayogi; Manohar Joshi
- Preceded by: Suraj Bhan
- Succeeded by: Charanjit Singh Atwal

Member of Parliament, Lok Sabha
- In office 25 February 1967 – 18 May 2004
- Preceded by: K. Nalla Koya Thangal
- Succeeded by: P. Pookunhi Koya
- Constituency: Lakshadweep

Personal details
- Born: 10 May 1941 Andrott Island, Lakshadweep, British India
- Died: 18 December 2005 (aged 64) Seoul, South Korea
- Cause of death: Cardiac arrest
- Party: Indian National Congress
- Spouse: A. B. Rahmath Sayeed
- Children: 1 son (Muhammed Hamdulla Sayeed) and 7 daughters

Padanatha Mohammed Sayeed (10 May 1941 – 18 December 2005) was a leader of the Indian National Congress party. He was a member of Lok Sabha for ten consecutive terms from 1967 to 2004 representing Lakshadweep. His nearly 37-year tenure in the Lok Sabha is the longest uninterrupted time in office of any member of Parliament.

== Early life ==
P. M. Sayeed was born in Andrott Island, Lakshadweep. He studied at Government Arts College, Mangalore and at Sidhartha College of Law, Mumbai.

== Political career ==
P. M. Sayeed was first elected to Lok Sabha in 1967 at the age of 26. Late KeraKada Syed Mohammed from Andrott, the first graduate and Law graduate from Lakshadweep mentored Shri.Sayeed and made him a candidate in the 1967 Parliament elections. He became the first and only Parliamentarian from Lakshadweep Lok Sabha constituency to become a Cabinet Minister. He served as Union Minister of State, Steel, Coal and Mines in 1979–1980; Union Minister of State, Home Affairs 1993–1995; Union Minister of State, Information and Broadcasting 1995–1996; and Deputy Speaker, Lok Sabha 1998–2004. He was a member of the Congress Working Committee.

Sayeed won the Lok Sabha elections in 1967 and continued to win every election till 2004 serving for ten consecutive terms as Member of Parliament for Lakshadweep in total. This run was halted when he was defeated by Dr P Pookunhikoya of Janata Dal (United) in the 2004 general election by 71 votes. He then became a member of the Rajya Sabha representing the National Capital territory of Delhi. He was Union Power Minister when he died of a cardiac arrest in Seoul on 18 December 2005.

== Personal life ==
His son Muhammed Hamdulla Sayeed, a Law graduate from Indian Society College in Pune, was elected from the Lakshadweep constituency at the age of 26. He was the youngest MP in the 15th Lok Sabha.
