= Muhammed Hamdulla Sayeed =

Indian politician

Muhammed Hamdullah Sayeed

Member of Parliament
- Incumbent
- Assumed office 4 June 2024
- Preceded by: Mohammed Faizal P. P
- Constituency: Lakshadweep
- In office 16 May 2009 – 17 May 2014
- Preceded by: P. Pookunhi Koya
- Succeeded by: Mohammed Faizal P. P
- Constituency: Lakshadweep

President Lakshadweep Pradesh Congress Committee

Personal details
- Born: 11 April 1982 (age 44) Andrott, Lakshadweep
- Party: Indian National Congress
- Spouse: Thasleema Padannatha
- Parent(s): P M Sayeed, Rahmath Sayeed

Muhammed Hamdullah Sayeed (born 11 April 1982, Mysore) is an Indian politician. He is a leader of the Indian National Congress party. He was elected to the 15th Lok Sabha from Lakshadweep in 2009.

== Early life ==
Muhammed Hamdullah Sayeed was born in Mysore to former Congress leader P.M. Sayeed and Rahmath Sayeed.

== Political career ==
Muhammed Hamdullah Sayeed was elected to the 15th Lok Sabha at the age of 26. He was the youngest MP in the 15th Lok Sabha.
