= Mohammed Faizal Padippura =

Indian politician (born 1975)

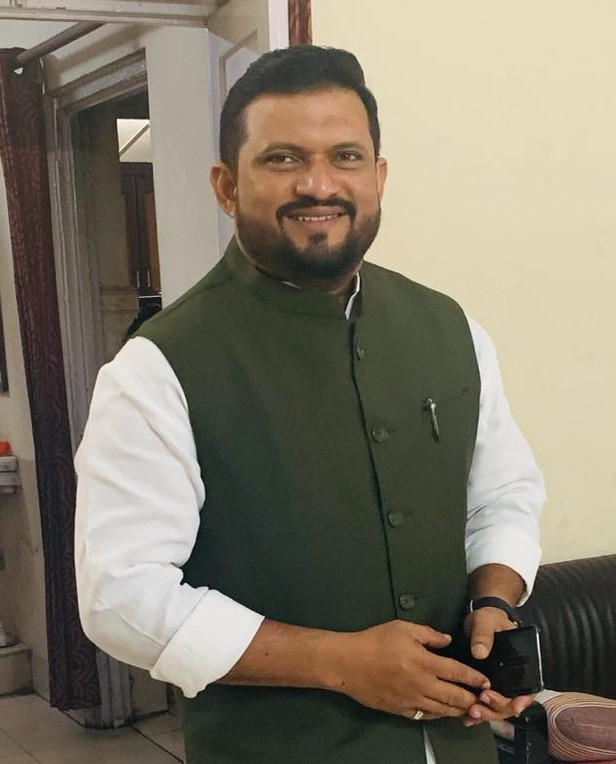

Member of Parliament, Lok Sabha
- In office 16 May 2014 – 4 June 2024
- Preceded by: Muhammed Hamdulla Sayeed
- Succeeded by: Muhammed Hamdulla Sayeed
- Constituency: Lakshadweep

Personal details
- Born: 28 May 1975 (age 50) Andrott, Lakshadweep, India
- Party: Nationalist Congress Party (Sharadchandra Pawar) (2024–present); Nationalist Congress Party (until 2024)
- Spouse: Smt. Rahmath Beegum
- Children: 4 (1 son, 3 daughters)
- Education: Master of Business Administration (University of Calicut)
- Alma mater: University of Calicut; Sir Syed College
- Occupation: Social worker
- As of 17 December, 2016

Mohammed Faizal Padippura (born 28 May 1975) is an Indian politician and social worker and Ex Member of Parliament, Lok Sabha from Union Territory of Lakshadweep. He was elected as the party whip of the Nationalist Congress Party in the 16th Lok Sabha. In January 2023, Faizal and four others were sentenced to 10 years in jail in a case of attempt to murder. After this verdict, Mohammad Faizal was disqualified from Lok Sabha and on 29 March 2023 his membership was restored. The Ethics Committee of Lok Sabha took this decision. On 25 January, The High court of Kerala suspended the judgement of Kavaratti court against him. On 30 January, The Election Commission of India deferred by-election for Parliamentary constituency in Lakshadweep after Kerala High Court passed an order on 25 January suspending the conviction. He was defeated in Lakshadweep Lok Sabha constituency in the 2024 election.

== Personal life ==
Mohammed Faizal was born on 28 May 1975 at Andrott, Lakshadweep to Pookoya Thangal Kunnamkalam and Safiyabi Padippura. He is graduated with a bachelor's degree in zoology from Sir Syed College, Kannur in 1998, and earned a postgraduate Master of Business Administration (MBA) degree from the University of Calicut in 2000. He married Rahmath Beegum on 19 September 2002 and the couple has four children, Fazna Bind Faizal, Ayisha Liyana, Ayisha Naveeda and SM Quthbudheen Bakthiyar.

== Career ==
Mohammed Faizal PP was a social worker and business advisor before he was elected to the Parliament of India. He is a member of the Nationalist Congress Party. In 2014, he was elected to the 16th Lok Sabha as the Member of Parliament for the Lakshadweep constituency. He campaigned on a platform of increasing employment, ensuring the livelihoods of fishermen, providing improved healthcare, improving the standards of life of the common man and promoting the island's tourist industry. During the period 2014–2016, he was a member of the Standing Committee on Transport, Tourism and Culture, and the Consultative Committee of the Ministry of Home Affairs.

In May 2019, he was re-elected as member of parliament to the 17th Lok Sabha representing Lakshadweep and is a member of Standing Committee on Personnel, Public Grievances, Law and Justice. On 13 September 2019, he became a member of the Consultative Committee of the Ministry of Minority Affairs.

== Legal Issues ==
In January 2023, Mohammad Faisal was sentenced to ten years imprisonment. The verdict is that of the sessions court in Kavarathi. Four people, including Faisal, were accused in the violence during the 2009 elections.

Lok Sabha
Preceded by Muhammed Hamdulla Sayeed	Member of Parliament for Lakshadweep; 2014 – 2023	Succeeded by Vacant
