= Islam in Bhutan =

Overview of Islam in Bhutan

Islam in Bhutan is the religion of a very small minority in the Kingdom of Bhutan, where Vajrayana Buddhism is recognised by the constitution as the country’s “spiritual heritage” and Hinduism is the second-largest faith. Estimates of the Muslim population range from roughly 0.2 percent to about 1 percent of the total population (approximately 1,500–7,000 people). No Muslim organisation is known to be registered with the state’s Commission for Religious Organizations (Chhoedey Lhentshog).

== History ==
Scholarly research on the history of Islam in Bhutan is scarce. The Muslim presence is generally attributed to migrants, traders and seasonal workers from neighbouring regions of India and Bangladesh. Most Muslims in Bhutan today are of South Asian origin and maintain a low public profile.

== Demographics ==
The Bhutanese government does not publish a detailed official breakdown that isolates Muslims.

Pew Research Center estimates for 2010 placed Muslims at approximately 0.2 percent, while other secondary sources (including Indian media and older compilations) have suggested figures closer to 5,000–7,000 people (roughly 0.7–1 percent). A 1989 Library of Congress country study is sometimes cited as giving a figure of about 5 percent, but this is widely regarded as outdated and unreliable for the present day.

Before the COVID-19 pandemic, India’s Ministry of External Affairs estimated that around 60,000 Indian nationals lived in Bhutan; many left during the pandemic. Most of these workers are Hindu, with a smaller number of Muslims. Bhutan’s National Statistics Bureau estimated the total population at approximately 770,000–790,000 in recent years.

== Legal status ==
The Constitution of Bhutan (2008) recognises Buddhism as the “spiritual heritage” of the country (Article 3), guarantees freedom of thought, conscience and religion, and prohibits discrimination on the basis of faith (Article 7). It also states that “no person shall be compelled to belong to another faith by means of coercion or inducement” and describes the King as the “protector of all religions”.

The penal code criminalises “coercion or inducement to convert” as a misdemeanour punishable by up to three years’ imprisonment, although the terms are not precisely defined.

Under the Religious Organizations Act of 2007, religious groups must register with the Commission for Religious Organizations (Chhoedey Lhentshog). The Commission’s board is chaired by a cabinet minister and includes representatives of Buddhist organisations and the Hindu Dharma Samudaya. To register, a group must demonstrate that its leaders are Bhutanese citizens and disclose their educational qualifications and financial assets.

Unregistered groups may not organise public religious services, own property, raise funds, conduct outreach activities or import religious literature, although private worship is generally permitted. Government approval is required to construct any religious building, which must also conform to traditional Bhutanese architectural standards. Bhutan is not a party to the International Covenant on Civil and Political Rights.

As of the latest available information, only Buddhist and Hindu organisations are registered with the Commission; no Muslim organisation is known to have obtained registration.

== Places of worship ==
There is no publicly recognised mosque inside Bhutan. Muslims are reported to pray mainly in private homes or, in some cases, in multi-faith prayer rooms (for example, a facility in Bumthang that includes sections for different religions).

Some secondary sources claim that the Ahmadiyya Muslim Community completed a mosque in 2008. These claims remain unverified by official Bhutanese or independent international reports and may refer to a structure near the Indian border (Jaigaon, West Bengal), which lies outside Bhutanese territory.

== See also ==
- Religion in Bhutan
- Hinduism in Bhutan
- Freedom of religion in Bhutan
- Islam in Nepal
- Islam in South Asia
