= Islam in Kilakarai =

Regions with significant populations
- India

Languages
- Tamil, Arwi

Religion
- Sunni Islam

Related ethnic groups
- Arabs, Tamil Muslim, Lebbai, Marakayar

The Moors of Kilakarai (Tamil: கீழக்கரை முஸ்லிம்கள்) are a Tamil Muslim community who form the largest ethnic group in Kilakarai comprising 80% of the towns total population. The Moors of Kilakarai are Marakkars. They are predominantly followers of Islam tracing their ancestry to Arab traders mostly from Arabia and Yemen who settled in Kilakarai some time between 8th-15th century. The Kilakarai Moors lived primarily as coastal trading and agricultural communities, preserving their Islamic cultural heritage while adopting many Southern Asian customs. During the period of Portuguese colonisation of Ceylon, a small population of Sri Lankan Moors settled down in Kilakarai as they suffered widespread persecution.

== Language ==
The Arabic language brought by the early merchants is no longer spoken, though many Arabic words and phrases are still commonly used. Until the recent past, the Moors employed Arwi as their native language, though this is also extinct as a spoken language. Moors today use Tamil as their primary language with influence from Arabic. Many Arabic and Arabized words exist in the form of Tamil spoken by Kilakarai moors. Among many examples, greetings and blessings are exchanged in Arabic instead of Tamil, such as Assalamu Alaikum instead of Sandhiyum Samadanamum, Jazakallah instead of Nandri and Pinjhan/Finjan for Bowl/Cup.There are also words which are unique to Kilakarai Moors and a few other Tamil Muslim communities such as Laatha for elder-sister, Kaka for elder-brother, Umma for mother and Vappa for father. There are also words derived from Sinhala such as Mattapa for terrace. There are also words from Purananuru era such as Aanam for Kulambu and Puliaanam for rasam or soup.

== Gallery ==
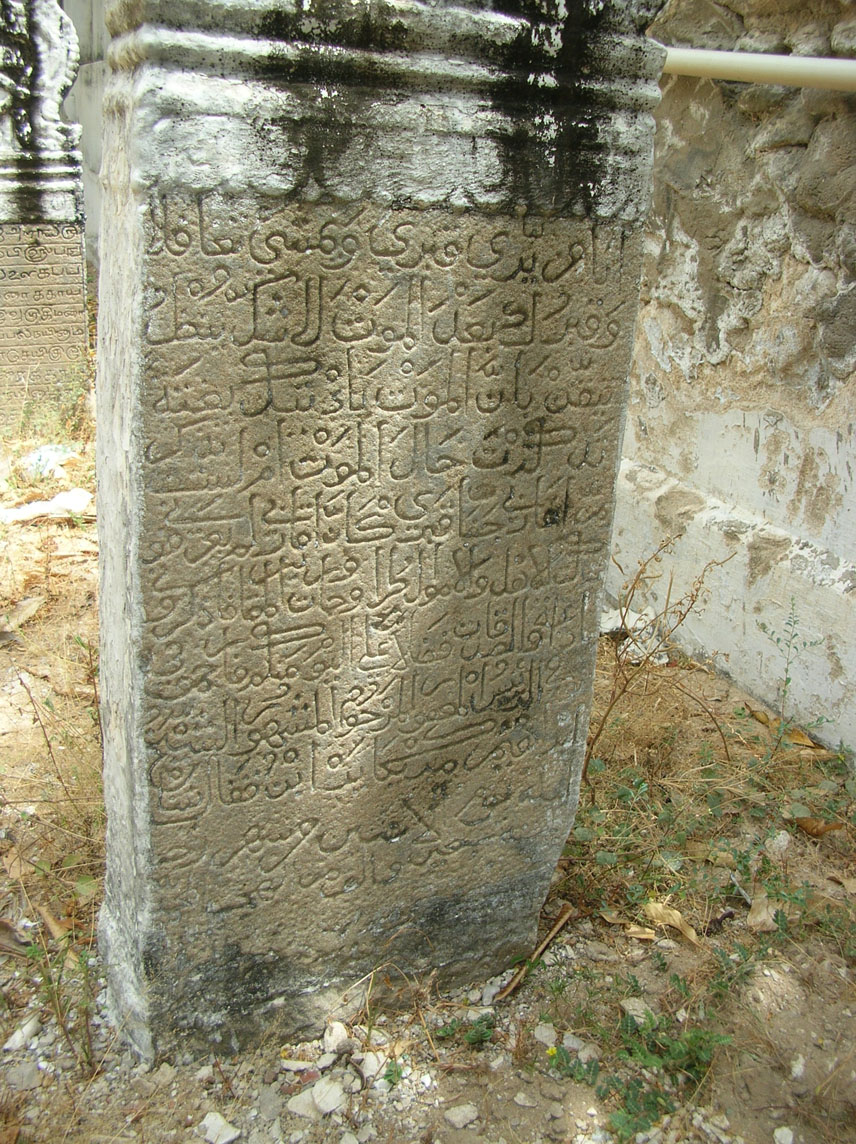
Kilakarai Arabic tombstone in oldest mosque of India (The Old Jumma Masjid of Kilakarai) Arwi Arabic script

== See also ==
- Arwi
- Kilakarai
- The Old Jumma Masjid of Kilakarai
- Tamil Muslim
- Labbay
- Marakkar
- Nawayath
