= Sir Syed College, Taliparamba =

College in Taliparamba, India

Coordinates: 12°2′20″N 75°22′38″E

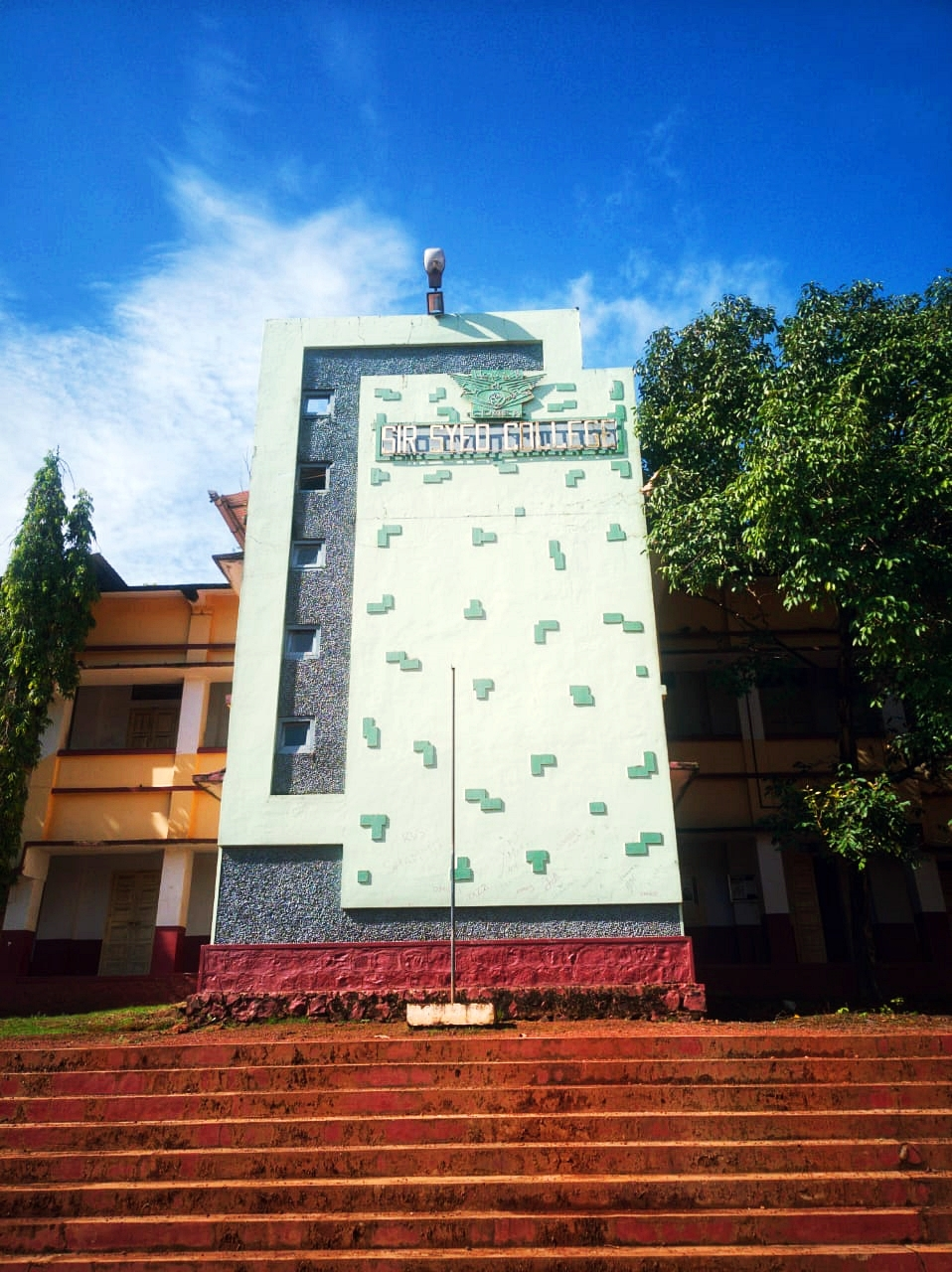
- Type: Aided college
- Established: 1967
- Affiliations: Kannur University
- Principal: Ismail Olayikkara
- Location: Taliparamba, Kerala, India
- Website: sirsyedcollege.ac.in

Sir Syed College is an academic institution situated in Taliparamba, Kerala, India, affiliated to the Kannur University. The college runs undergraduate and postgraduate programmes in science, commerce and arts, and offers research facilities in botany and chemistry. The college is recognized by the University Grants Commission (UGC) and reaccredited by NAAC at A level.

== History ==
The college was established in 1967 by Cannanore District Muslim Educational Association (CDMEA) which is a Thalassery based NGO. The college began in a temporary building at Karimbam junction. The new campus at Pranthan Kunnu has more facilities like football and basketball grounds and a botanic garden. The college has laboratories for the students of physics, botany and chemistry.

== Attached institutions ==
- Sir Syed Institute for Technical Studies
- Keyi Sahib Training College
- Sir Syed Higher Secondary School
- Kurumathoor south UP school, kurumathoor

== Controversy ==
Sir Syed College in Taliparamba is on 25 acres of Waqf land. The land was given on lease in 1967 by the Taliparamba Jamaat Mosque Trust to the Cannanore District Muslim Educational Association (CDMEA). In 2025, controversy arose when CDMEA went to Kerala High Court and said the land belonged to Narikottu Illam. The Waqf Protection Committee alleged this was an attempt to claim waqf property with false documents. The college management stated that it was an error in the land tax records.

== Location ==
The college campus is located on a hillock at Karimbam, Taliparamba. The campus is 23 km (14 mi) away from Kannur railway station.

== Notable alumni ==
- Dr. Justice Kauser Edappagath, judge of Kerala High Court
- John Brittas
- Nikhila Vimal
- P. K. Kunhalikutty
- Mohammed Faizal P. P
