= P. Pookunhi Koya =

Indian politician (born 1949)

Dr. P. Pookunhi Koya

Member of Parliament, Lok Sabha
- In office 16 May 2004 – 18 May 2009
- Preceded by: P. M. Sayeed
- Succeeded by: Muhammed Hamdulla Sayeed
- Constituency: Lakshadweep

Personal details
- Born: 1 January 1949 (age 77) Amini, Lakshadweep
- Party: Samata Party; Janata Dal (United)
- Spouse: Sarommabi
- Children: 2 sons and 1 daughter
- As of 16 September, 2006

Dr. P. Pookunhi Koya (born 1 January 1949) was a member of the 14th Lok Sabha of India. He represented the Lakshadweep constituency as a member of the JD(U).
