= Lakshadweep Lok Sabha constituency =

Constituency of the Indian parliament

Coordinates: 10.57°N 72.63°E

Lakshadweep LD-1
- Lok Sabha constituency
- Interactive Map Outlining Lakshadweep Lok Sabha constituency

Constituency details
- Country: India
- Union Territory: Lakshadweep
- Established: 1957
- Total electors: 57,784
- Reservation: ST

Member of Parliament
- 18th Lok Sabha
- Incumbent Muhammed Hamdulla Sayeed
- Party: INC
- Alliance: INDIA
- Elected year: 2024

Lakshadweep Lok Sabha constituency is a Lok Sabha constituency, which covers the entire area of the UT of Lakshadweep in India. This seat is reserved for STs. As of 2014, it is the smallest Lok Sabha constituency in terms of electorate. Lakshadweep didn't have an elected MP (LS) till 1967.

Until 1957, Lakshadweep formed part of a constituency in the Malabar District, but it was only in 1967 that its MP was directly elected, having previously been appointed by the President of India. Its first MP was K. Nalla Koya Thangal of the INC who served two terms from 1957 to 1967. Its first election in 1967 was won by independent politician, P. M. Sayeed. In the next election in 1971, Sayeed representing the INC was elected unopposed. He went on to win the next 8 elections consecutively before being defeated by 71 votes in the 2004 election by P. Pookunhi Koya of the Samata party. In total, Sayeed represented this constituency in the Lok Sabha for ten consecutive terms from 1967 to 2004. In the 2009 election, Sayeed's son, Md Hamdulla Sayeed, won the seat. After 2019 General elections, Md Faizal Padippura of the NCP was the MP till his disqualification. He was disqualified after he was convicted with 10-year jail term. However, his conviction was suspended by Kerala HC, and he was reinstated as MP. Currently, Muhammed Hamdulla Sayeed is serving as the MP.

== Members of Parliament ==
Year	Member	Party
1957	K. Nalla Koya Thangal (Note: Thangal was directly appointed by the President of India to serve as MP for this constituency in 1957 and 1962.)	Indian National Congress
1962	K. Nalla Koya Thangal	Indian National Congress
1967	P. M. Sayeed	Independent
1971	P. M. Sayeed	Indian National Congress
1977	P. M. Sayeed	Indian National Congress
1980	P. M. Sayeed	Indian National Congress (U)
1984	P. M. Sayeed	Indian National Congress
1989	P. M. Sayeed	Indian National Congress
1991	P. M. Sayeed	Indian National Congress
1996	P. M. Sayeed	Indian National Congress
1998	P. M. Sayeed	Indian National Congress
1999	P. M. Sayeed	Indian National Congress
2004	P. Pookunhi Koya	Janata Dal (United)
2009	Muhammed Hamdulla Sayeed	Indian National Congress
2014	Mohammed Faizal Padippura	Nationalist Congress Party
2019	Mohammed Faizal Padippura	Nationalist Congress Party
2024	Muhammed Hamdulla Sayeed	Indian National Congress

== Election results ==
Vote share of Winning candidates
2024	52.29%
2019	48.61%
2014	50.11%
2009	51.88%
2004	49.02%
1999	53.96%
1998	51.55%
1996	51.71%
1991	50.55%
1989	52.27%
1984	54.47%
1980	56.37%
1977	58.59%
1971	0.00%
1967	35.16%

=== 2024 ===
2024 Indian general election: Lakshadweep
Party	Candidate	Votes	%	±%
INC	Md. Hamdulla Sayeed	25,726	52.29	▲5.43
NCP-SP	Md. Faizal	23,079	46.91	
NCP	T. P. Yousuf	201	0.41	▼48.20
NOTA	None of the Above	133	0.27	▲0.06
IND	Koya	61	0.12	
Majority		2,647	5.38	▲3.63
Turnout		49,200	85.14	▼0.07
INC gain from NCP		Swing		

=== 2019 ===
2019 Indian general election: Lakshadweep
Party	Candidate	Votes	%	±%
NCP	Md. Faizal P. P.	22,851	48.61	▼1.50
INC	Md. Hamdulla Sayeed	22,028	46.86	▲0.30
JD(U)	K. P. Md. Sadique	1,342	2.85	
CPI(M)	Shareef Khan	420	0.89	▼0.19
CPI	K. Ali Akbar	143	0.30	▼0.12
BJP	Abdul Khader Haji	125	0.27	▼0.16
NOTA	None of the Above	100	0.21	▼0.07
Majority		823	1.75	▼1.80
Turnout		47,026	85.21	▼1.40
NCP hold		Swing		

=== 2014 ===
2014 Indian general election: Lakshadweep
Party	Candidate	Votes	%	±%
NCP	Md. Faizal P. P.	21,665	50.11	▲3.79
INC	Md. Hamdulla Sayeed	20,130	46.56	▼5.32
SP	Komalam Koya	488	1.13	
CPI(M)	Dr. Abdul Muneer	465	1.08	▼0.10
BJP	M. P. Sayed Md. Koya	187	0.43	▼0.19
CPI	C. T. Najmudheen	181	0.42	
NOTA	None of the Above	123	0.28	
Majority		1,535	3.55	▼2.01
Turnout		43,239	86.61	▲0.71
NCP gain from INC		Swing		

=== 2009 ===
Muhammed Hamdulla Sayeed won the seat and also became the youngest member of the 15th Lok Sabha.

2009 Indian general election: Lakshadweep
Party	Candidate	Votes	%	±%
INC	Md. Hamdulla Sayeed	20,492	51.88	▲3.09
NCP	P. Pookunhi Koya	18,294	46.32	
CPI(M)	M. K. Lukmanul Hakeem	467	1.18	
BJP	Dr. K. P. Muthukoya	245	0.62	
Majority		2,198	5.56	▲5.33
Turnout		39,498	85.90	▲4.38
INC gain from JD(U)		Swing		

=== 2004 ===
P. Pookunhi Koya of the JD (U) party (part of the BJP-led NDA) defeated the ten term incumbent MP, P. M. Sayeed by 71 votes.

General election, 2004: Lakshadweep
Party	Candidate	Votes	%	±%
JD(U)	P. Pookunhi Koya	15,597	49.02	▲5.74
INC	P. M. Sayeed	15,526	48.79	▼5.17
JP	E. P. Attakoya Thangal	468	1.47	
SP	Ameer Puthiyathanoda	229	0.72	
Margin of victory		71	0.23	▼10.45
Turnout		31,820	81.52	▲1.31
JD(U) gain from INC		Swing		

=== 1999 ===
P. M. Sayeed held the seat and represented the constituency in the 13th Lok Sabha.

1999 Indian general election: Lakshadweep
Party	Candidate	Votes	%	±%
INC	P. M. Sayeed	16,113	53.96	▲2.41
JD(U)	Dr. K. P. Muthukoya	12,924	43.28	
JD(S)	Hussain Faburikage	542	1.82	
IND	Ameer Biyyammada	281	0.94	
Majority		3,189	10.68	▲7.58
Turnout		30,174	80.21	▼4.89
INC hold		Swing		

=== 1998 ===
P. M. Sayeed held the seat and represented the constituency in the 12th Lok Sabha.

1998 Indian general election: Lakshadweep
Party	Candidate	Votes	%	±%
INC	P. M. Sayeed	16,014	51.55	▲0.16
JD	Mohammed Koya Kunnamkalam	15,050	48.45	▼0.16
Margin of victory		964	3.10	▼0.32
Turnout		31,264	85.10	▼3.94
INC hold		Swing		

=== 1996 ===
P. M. Sayeed held the seat and represented the constituency in the 11th Lok Sabha.

1996 Indian general election: Lakshadweep
Party	Candidate	Votes	%	±%
INC	P. M. Sayeed	15,611	51.71	▲1.16
JD	Mohammed Koya Kunnamkalam	14,577	48.29	▼1.16
Margin of victory		1,034	3.42	▲2.32
Turnout		30,373	89.04	▲8.67
INC hold		Swing		

=== 1991 ===
P. M. Sayeed held the seat and represented the constituency in the 10th Lok Sabha.

1991 Indian general election: Lakshadweep
Party	Candidate	Votes	%	±%
INC	P. M. Sayeed	12,801	50.55	▼1.72
JD	Mohammed Koya Kunnamkalam	12,520	49.45	▲1.72
Margin of victory		281	1.10	▼3.44
Turnout		25,449	80.37	▼4.62
INC hold		Swing		

=== 1989 ===
P. M. Sayeed held the seat and represented the constituency in the 9th Lok Sabha.

1989 Indian general election: Lakshadweep
Party	Candidate	Votes	%	±%
INC	P. M. Sayeed	13,323	52.27	▼2.20
IND	Mohammed Koya Kunnamkalam	12,167	47.73	▲2.20
Margin of victory		1,156	4.54	▼4.40
Turnout		25,555	84.99	▼1.99
INC hold		Swing	▼2.20	

=== 1984 ===
P. M. Sayeed returned to the INC and held the seat and represented the constituency in the 8th Lok Sabha.

1984 Indian general election: Lakshadweep
Party	Candidate	Votes	%	±%
INC	P. M. Sayeed	10,361	54.47	+50.62
IND	Mohammed Koya Kunnamkalam	8,662	45.53	N/A
Margin of victory		1,699	8.94	−7.65
Turnout		19,105	86.98	−1.80
INC gain from INC(U)		Swing	+50.62	

=== 1980 ===
P. M. Sayeed defected to the Indian National Congress (U) party but still held the seat and represented the constituency in the 7th Lok Sabha.

1980 Indian general election: Lakshadweep
Party	Candidate	Votes	%	±%
INC(U)	P. M. Sayeed	10,018	56.37	N/A
JP	Mohammed Koya Kunnamkalam	7,069	39.78	N/A
INC	Amanulla Baliapathoda	685	3.85	−54.74
Margin of victory		2,949	16.59	−0.59
Turnout		17,860	88.78	+4.14
INC(U) gain from INC		Swing		

=== 1977 ===
1977 Indian general election: Lakshadweep
Party	Candidate	Votes	%	±%
INC	P. M. Sayeed	9,600	58.59	
IND	Md. Koya Kunnamkalam	6,786	41.41	
Majority		2,814	17.18	
Turnout		16,480	84.64	
INC hold		Swing		

=== 1971 ===
In the 1971 election, INC candidate, P. M. Sayeed was elected unopposed.

1971 Indian general election: Laccadive, Minicoy and Amindivi Islands
Party	Candidate	Votes	%	±%
INC	P. M. Sayeed	0	Unopposed	
Turnout		0	0.00	
INC gain from Independent		Swing		

=== 1967 ===
Independent candidate, P. M. Sayeed won the first election and represented this constituency in the 4th Lok Sabha. Sayeed was also the youngest MP elected to the 4th Lok Sabha.

1967 Indian general election: Laccadive, Minicoy and Amindivi
Party	Candidate	Votes	%	±%
IND	P. M. Sayeed	4,151	35.16	
IND	A. T. Arnakad	3,765	31.89	
IND	M. K. Thalakakkad	2,319	19.64	
IND	M. M. Pappada	935	7.92	
IND	C. K. T. Akkarapalli	637	5.40	
Majority		386	3.27	
Turnout		11,897	82.02	
Independent win (new seat)				

== See also ==
- Ladakh Lok Sabha constituency
- List of constituencies of the Lok Sabha
- Government of India
