= Palaiya Jumma Palli =

Mosque in Kilakarai, Tamil Nadu, India

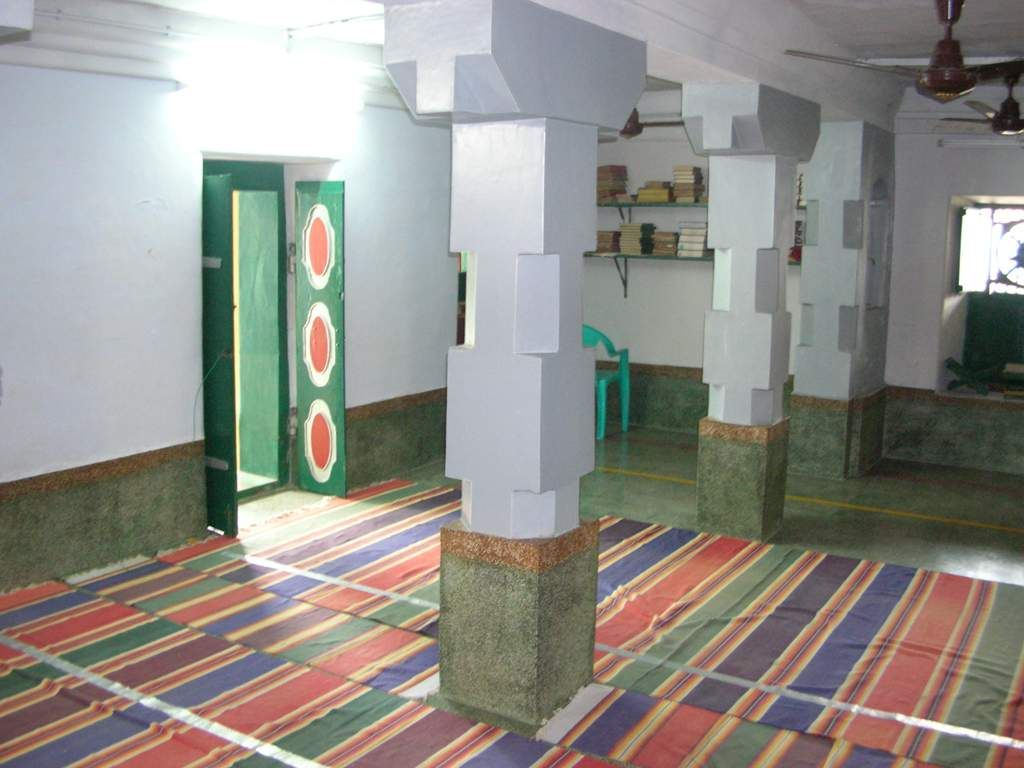
- Old Jumma Masjid of Kilakarai

- Location of the mosque in Tamil Nadu

Religion
- Affiliation: Islam
- Ecclesiastical or organisational status: Mosque
- Status: Active

Location
- Location: Kilakarai, Tamil Nadu
- Country: India
- Coordinates: 9°13′53″N 78°47′04″E

Architecture
- Architect: Bazan Ibn Sasan
- Type: Mosque architecture
- Style: Tamil Islam architecture
- Groundbreaking: 628 CE
- Completed: 630 CE; 1036 CE (reconstruction)

Specifications
- Dome: One
- Minaret: Two

The Palaiya Jumma Palli (transl. Paḻaiya jum'mā paḷḷi – transl. Old Jumma Masjid), also known as the Meen Kadai Palli, is a mosque, located in Kilakarai, in the state of Tamil Nadu, India. Completed in 630 CE, it is believed to be one of the oldest mosques in the world and along with Cheraman Juma Masjid in Kodungallur, Kerala and Barwada Mosque in Ghogha, Gujarat, the first mosque in India.

The mosque is located in Kilakarai, an ancient port town in South India. It was built between 628–630 CE and was re-constructed in 1036 CE. The mosque, along with the others in the town, is one of the greatest examples of Tamil Islam architecture.

== History and construction ==
Constructed by the Yemeni merchants and trade settlers of the pre-Islamic period in Pandiya kingdom ordered by Baadhan (Bazan ibn Sasan) Governor of Yemen at the time of Muhammad, after they accepted Islam in 625–628 CE at the time of Kavadh II son of Khosrau II (king of Persia). This mosque was rebuilt in the 11th century after the Saheed War.

== Architecture ==
The mosque architecture is similar to temple architecture; however, the mosque does not have idol carving on the pillars or walls. The mihrab is on the wall of inner mosque which is unique identification of mosques for identifying the direction of prayer towards kaaba. The mihrab was exactly towards kaaba, and it's also proof of an early navigation system followed here. The name pallavasal means worship place, with many door access, the Tamil name of the mosque.

== Gallery ==
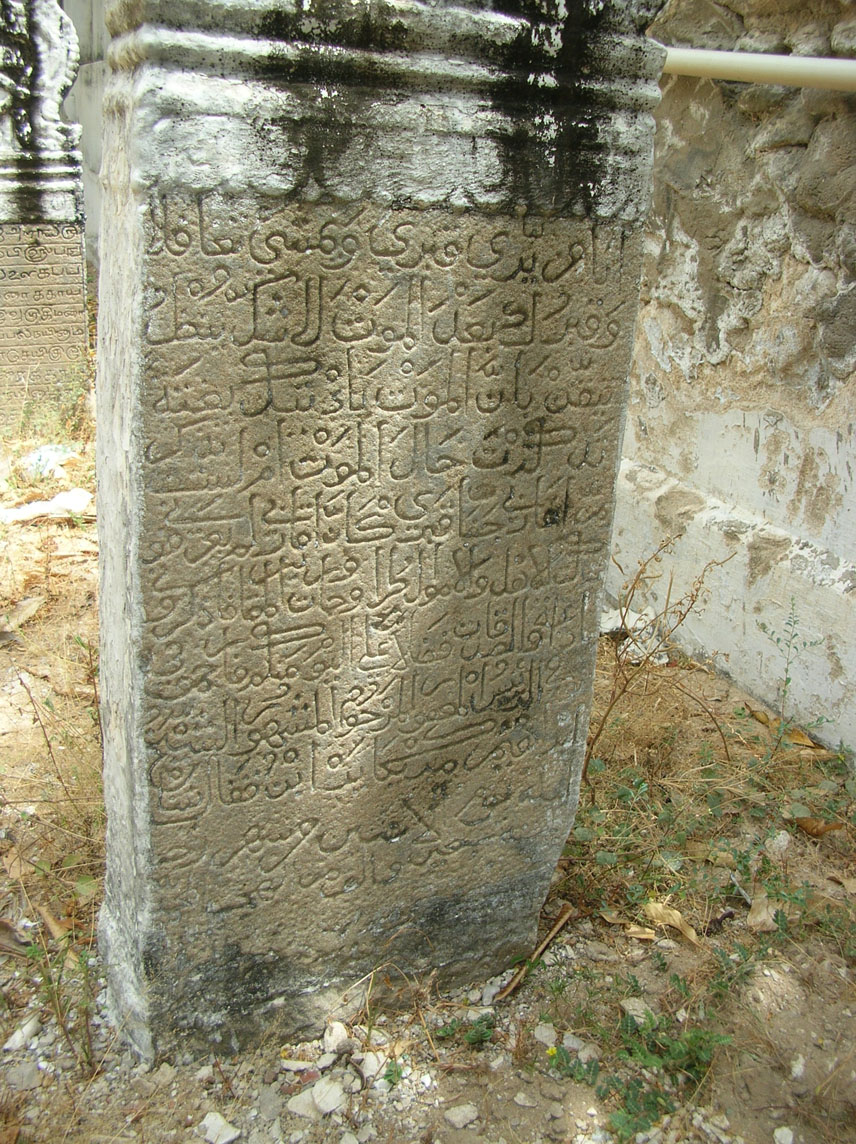
Tombstone in Arwi script

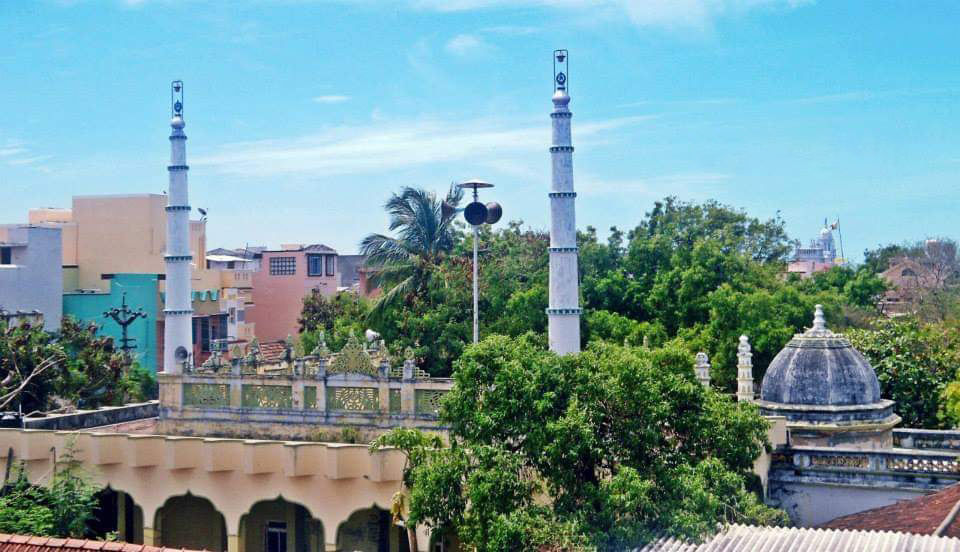
A view of the mosque roofline

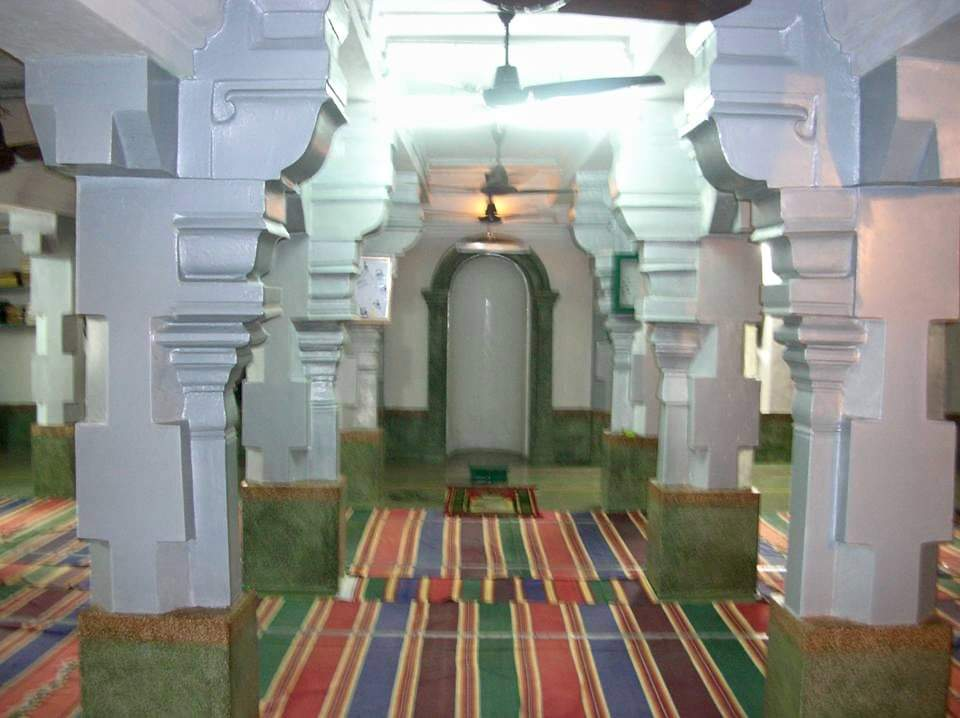
Mosque interior

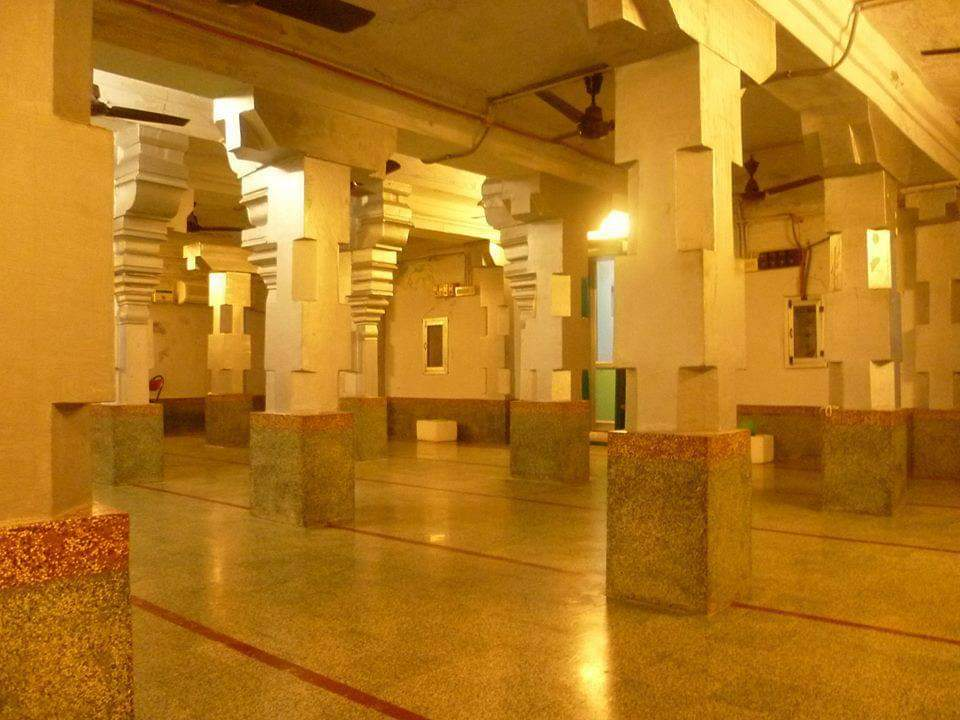

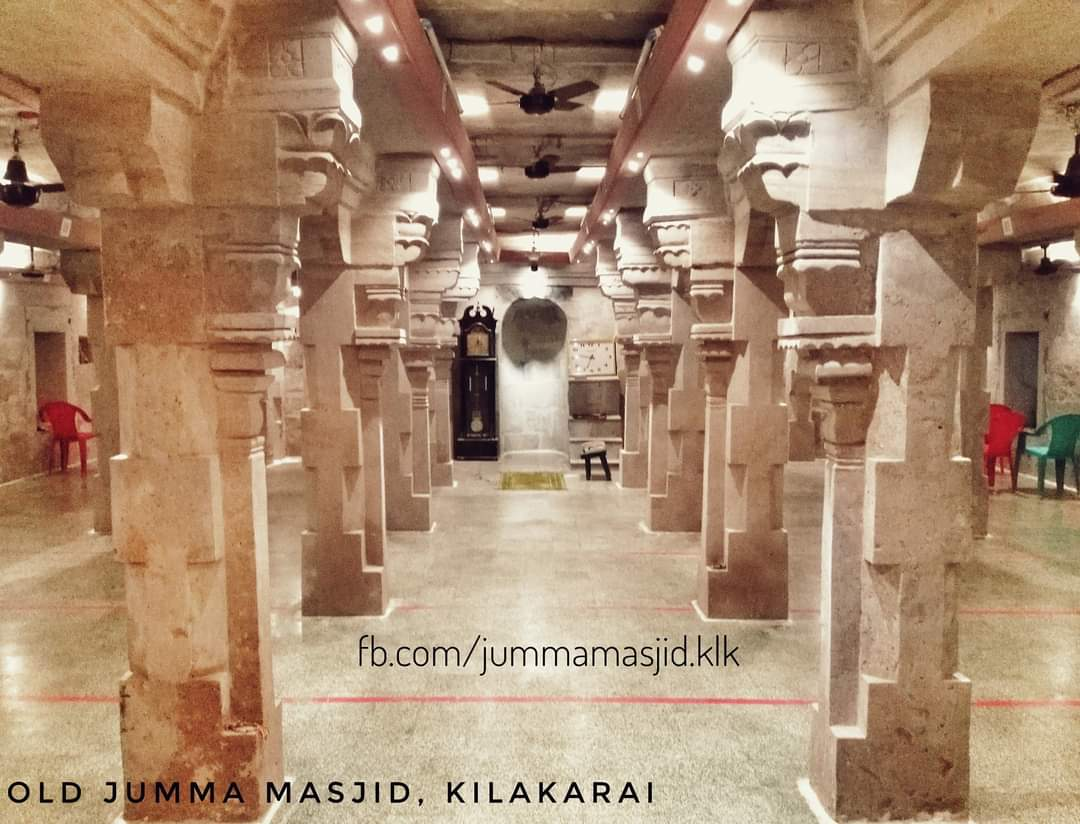

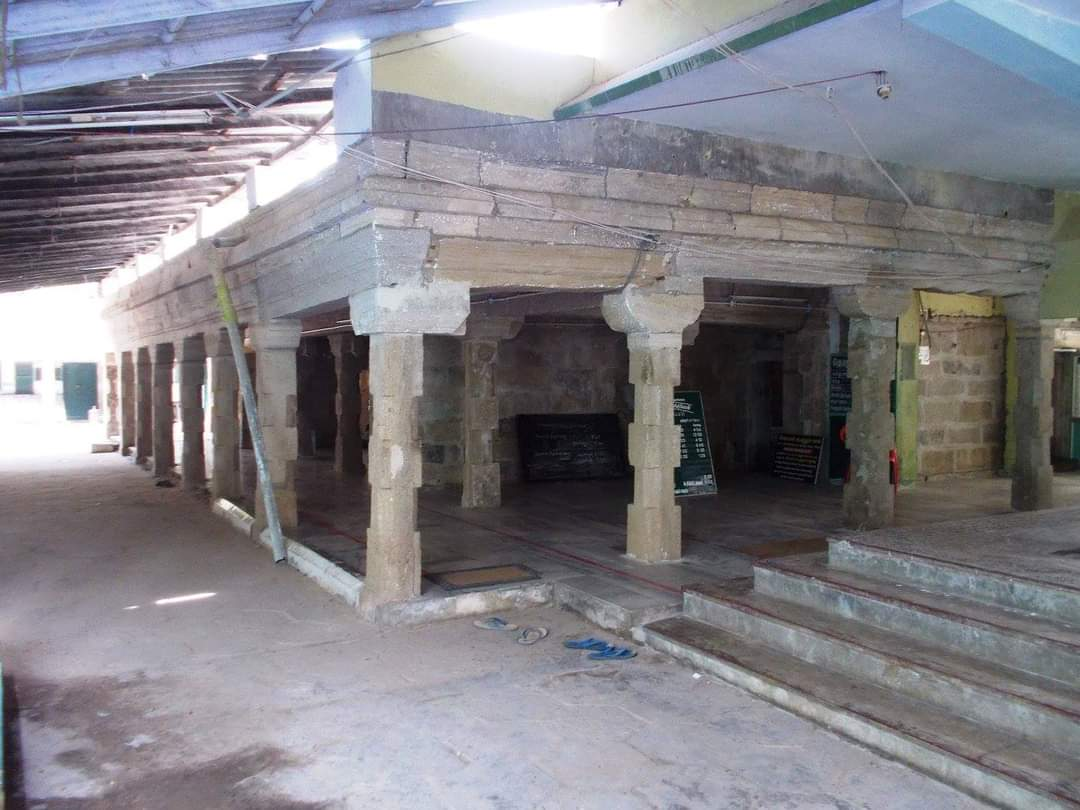

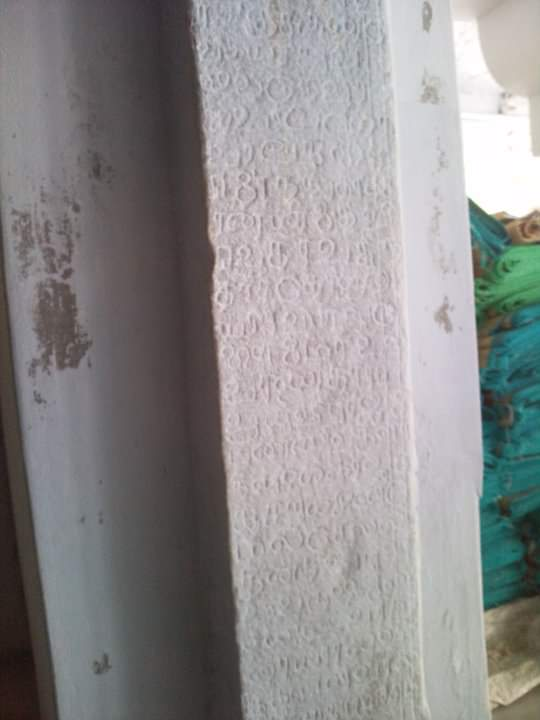

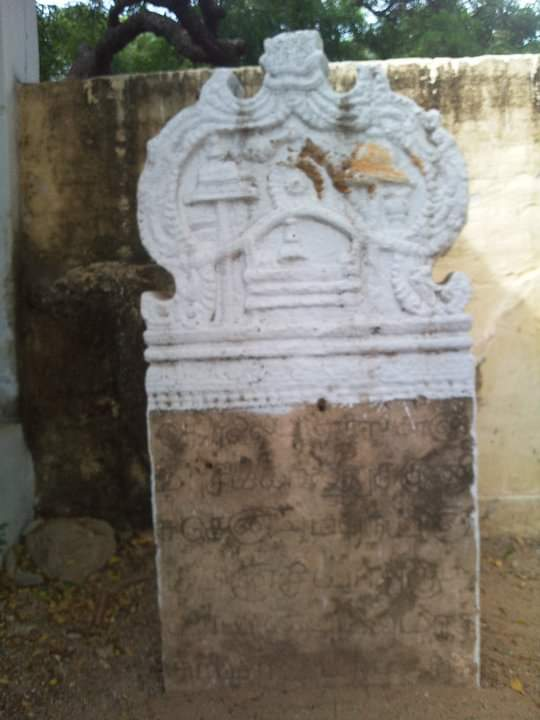

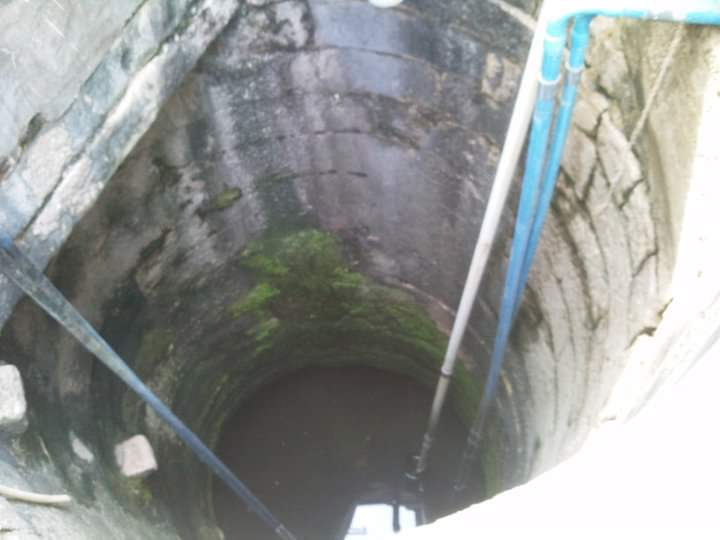

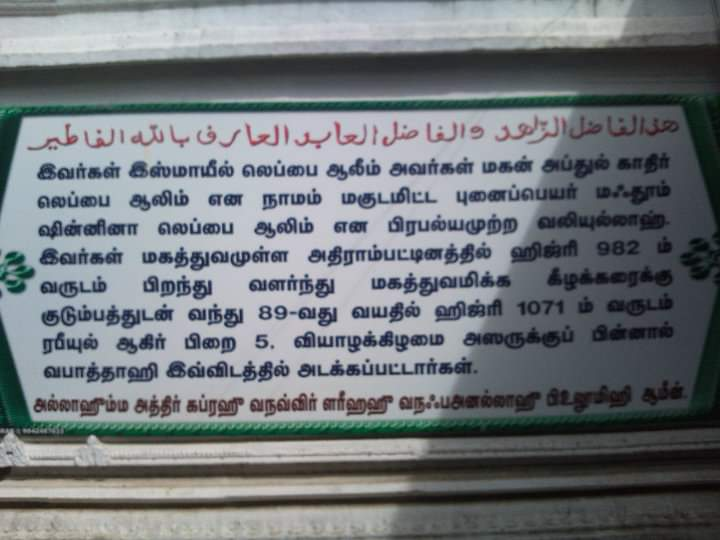

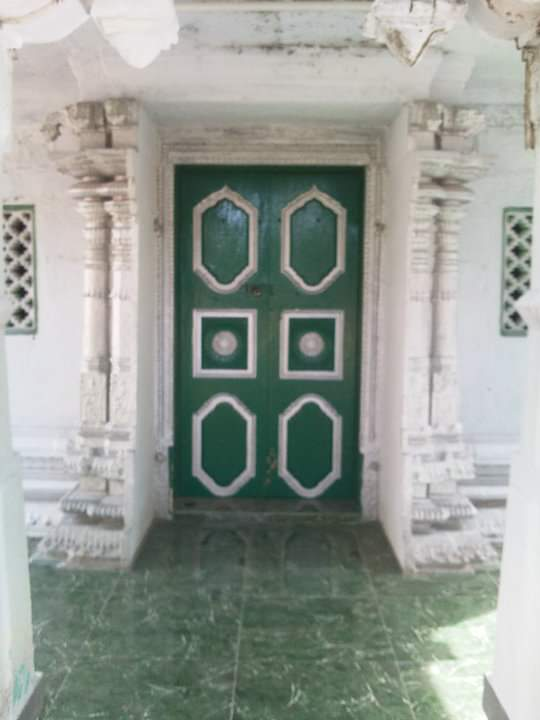
Green door of the mosque

== See also ==
- Islam in Kilakarai
- List of mosques in India
- List of the oldest mosques in the world
