= Sheikh Ubaidullah =

Muslim Arab saint, b, 663 AD

Personal life
- Born: 41 AH/663 AD Medina, Hejaz
- Died: Andrott, Lakshadweep, India
- Era: Islamic golden age

Religious life
- Religion: Sunni Islam

Sheikh Ubaidullah (born c. 663 AD) was a Muslim Arab from Medina.

== Early life ==
The name Ubaidullah is an indirect Quranic name that means "little servant of God". Ubaid is the diminutive form of the word Abd ("servant") and is formed from Ubaid ("little servant") and Allah ("God"), -u- being the case marking for the nominative (in construct state).

Nothing is known about his early life except his lineage which is traced to Caliph Abu Bakr, the first Rashidun Caliph, to whom he is believed to be closely related.

== Career ==
Tradition says that once while praying in the Prophet's mosque in Medina Ubaidullah fell asleep and saw a dream in which he saw Muhammad who told him to go to distant lands east of Jeddah to preach Islam to the people.

He interpreted the dream as a divine vision from God for his salvation and the people of those distant lands, so he proceeded to Jeddah where he travelled across the ocean for accomplishing his mission.

== Preaching Islam in Lakshadweep India ==
According to legend, on his journey his vessel capsized in a storm and he had to continue his journey by drifting on a plank till he reached Amini in AH 41 (663 AD). He started his act of preaching from Amini and was able to convert the Pondambelli family despite the initial linguistic challenges. After facing opposition there he left Amini with some of his new Muslim fellows and moved to Andrott where he got significantly high conversions. He then went to Kavaratti and Agatti, preaching there and then came back to Amini. This time unlike his first arrival in Amini, he was welcomed and via his preaching could successfully influence and convert almost the whole of population to Islam. At last stage of his life, he travelled to Andrott where he lived the rest of his life preaching and teaching. Ubaidullah never went back to his home land of Hijaz and devoted his life for dawah. Sheikh Ubaidullah advanced Islam in Lakshadweep (now in India) Islands by delivering sermons before the islanders.

== Death and legacy ==
Apparently, he died at Andrott Island with his remains buried in Juma Mosque.

Juma Mosque, one of the top attractions in Lakshadweep is said to have been built during his time.

It is believed that 97% of the population in Lakshadweep being Muslim at present is a result of his preaching.
