= Cheraman Juma Mosque =

Claimed oldest mosque in Indian subcontinent

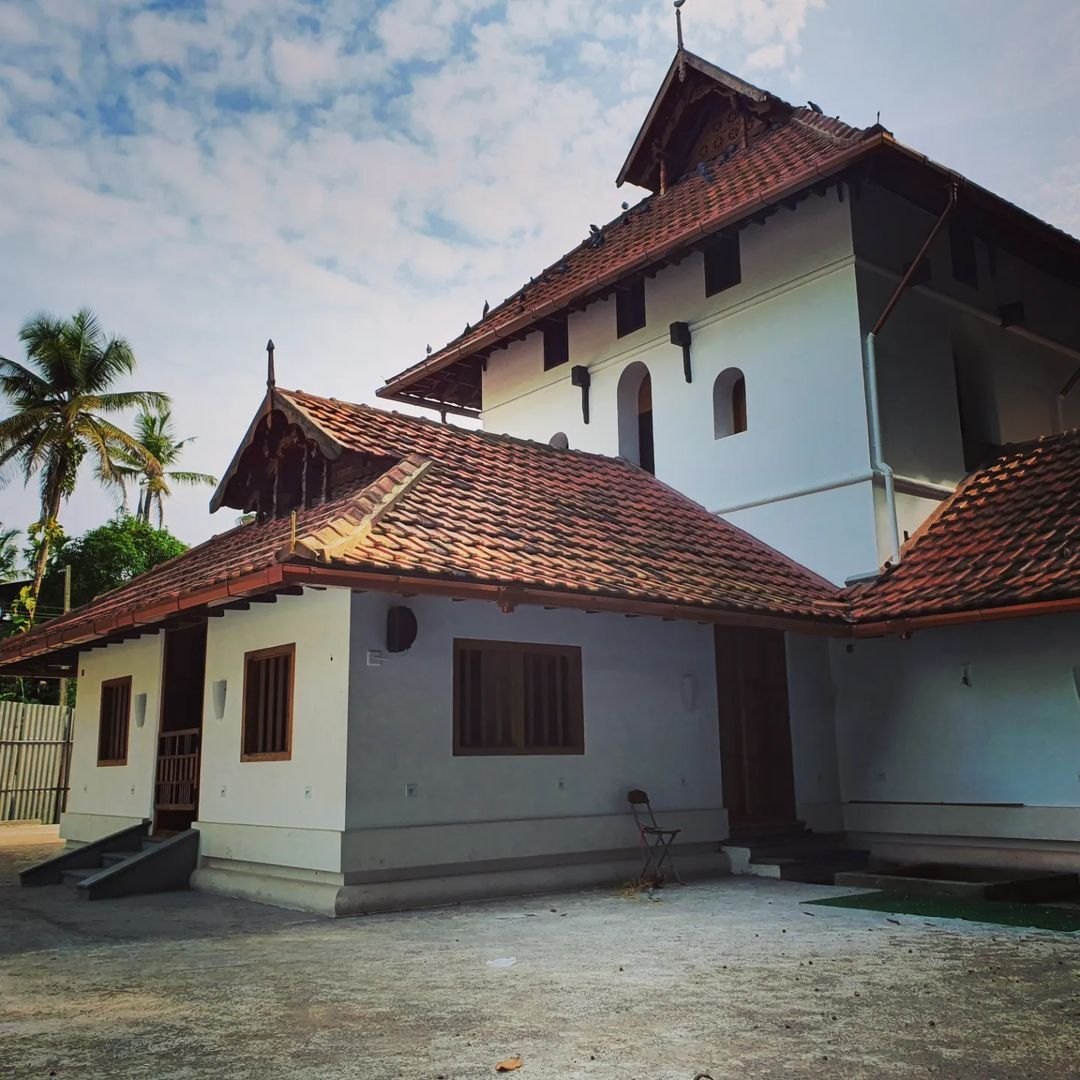
- The mosque in 2022, following restoration. (The added dome and minarets cannot be seen).

- Location of the mosque in Kerala

Religion
- Affiliation: Sunni Islam
- Ecclesiastical or organisational status: Mosque
- Status: Active

Location
- Location: Methala, Kodungalloor, Thrissur district, Kerala
- Country: India
- Coordinates: 10°13′12″N 76°11′38″E

Architecture
- Type: Mosque architecture
- Style: Kerala-Islamic; Vastu shastra
- Founder: Malik Bin Dinar (at the behest of Chera king)
- Completed: 629 CE; or 14-15th century; 1568 CE (rebuild); 1984 (extensions); 2022 (restoration)

Specifications
- Length: 61 m (200 ft)
- Width: 24 m (79 ft)
- Dome: One (1994–2022)
- Minaret: Four (1994–2022)

The Cheraman Juma Mosque is a mosque in Kodungallur, Thrissur district, in the state of Kerala, India. The mosque was built in 629 CE by Malik Bin Dinar though some scholars suggest a later construction date in the 14th–15th century. Due to these claims, it is often regarded as the first mosque built in India and the oldest mosque on the Indian subcontinent still in use. However, historical research has cast doubt on these claims, suggesting that the origin story may be fictitious or legendary rather than factual.

The mosque was built in the Kerala-Islamic traditional Vastu shastra architectural style, with hanging lamps, making the historicity of its date claims more convincing.

Modern corridors and halls were added in 1984, which surround the original building, and conceal almost all of the exterior features of the original structure. A dome and minarets were added in 1994 and removed following a restoration of the building in 2022.

The mosque is located on the Paravur–Kodungalloor Road.

== History ==
One legend states that the mosque was built in 629 CE. Other scholars are more skeptical and, based on the architectural style, have dated the structure from the 14th-15th century.

=== Legend of a Chera king ===
According to some legends, the Chera king witnessed a supernatural event mentioned in the Quran The story goes that the Chera king arrived in Arabia with a gift of ginger pickles for Muhammad and his companions and converted to Islam "at the feet of Prophet Muhammad".

According to historian M.G.S. Narayanan, "there is no reason to reject the tradition that the last Chera king embraced Islam and went to Mecca, since it finds its place not only in Muslim chronicles, but also in Hindu brahmanical chronicles like the Keralolpatti, which need not be expected to concoct such a tale which in no way enhances the prestige of the Brahmins or Hindu population."

Scholar Mehrdad Shokoohy however traced such legends to a much later accounts with different dating than the supposed earlier date. Historical research has found this story to be fictitious.

Cheraman(meaning respectful Chera) is a proclamation attribute given to great Chera kings. This mosque can't be associated to the Cheraman Perumal Nayanmar as his lifetime was in 8th century and prophet Muhammad lifetime is in 6th and 7th centuries.

== Visitors to the region ==
Plaque in the Memory of Indian President A. P. J. Abdul Kalam

Several early Muslim or Arab travellers visited Kerala in medieval times. Among them were Sulaiman, in 851 CE; Persian traveller Nakhuda Buzurg, in 951 CE; Ibn E Batuta, in 1342 CE; and Abd-Al-Razzaq, in 1442; as well as many others. The Cheraman Juma Mosque was not mentioned in their respective writings.

Since 2005, A. P. J. Abdul Kalam, the President of India and Dr Shashi Tharoor, the Member of Parliament for Thiruvananthapuram have visited the mosque.

== Gallery ==
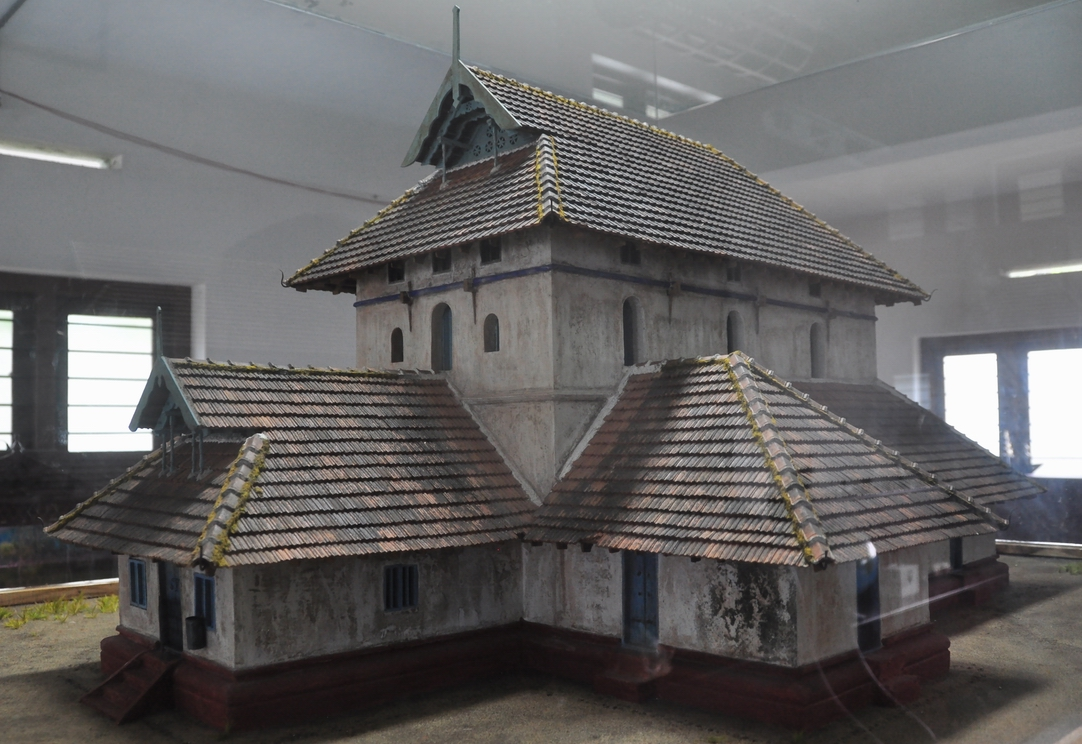
A scaled model of the mosque

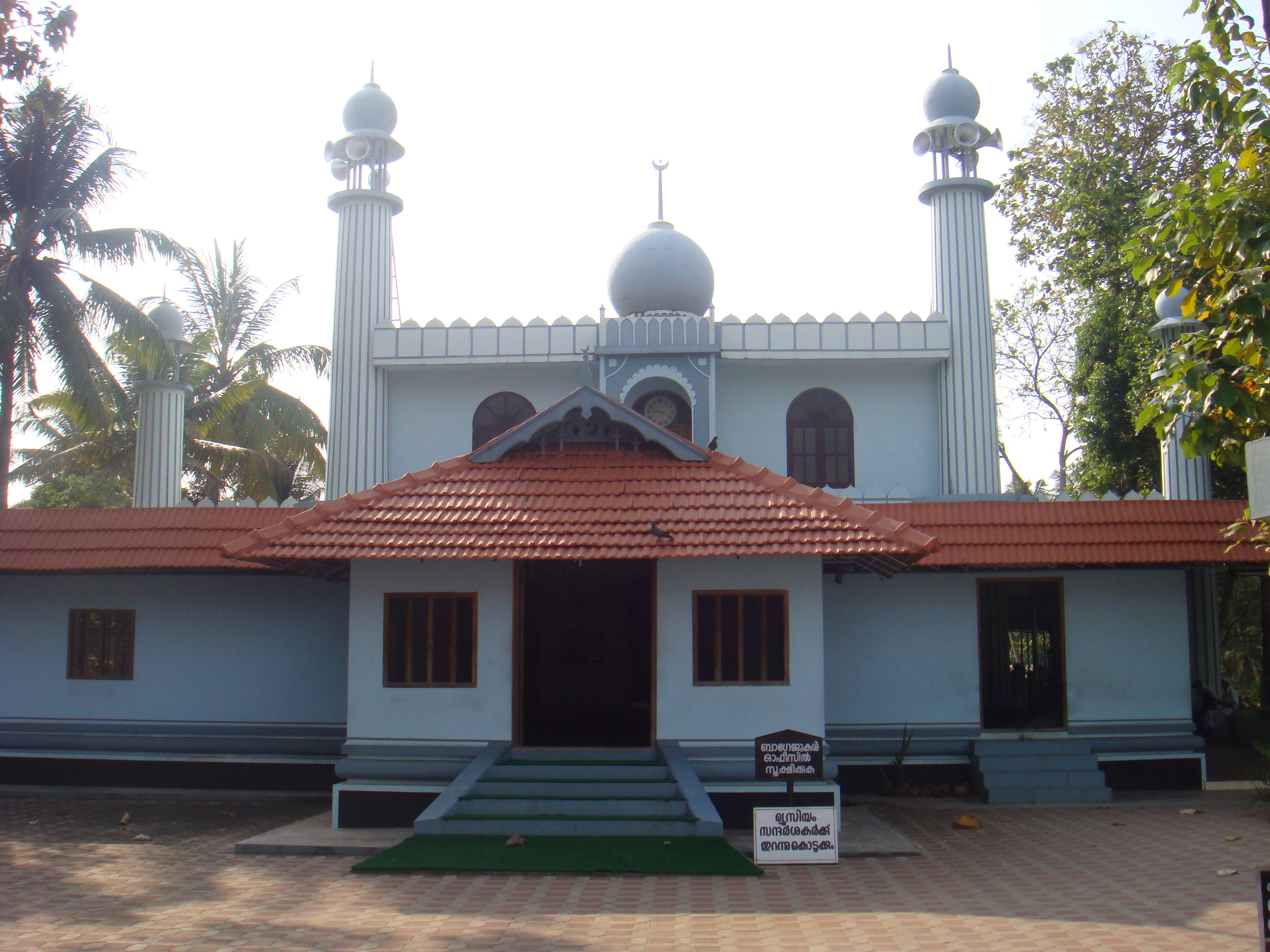
A remodelling of the mosque in 1994

Foundation plaque of the Mosque

Cheraman Juma Mosque in 2026

== See also ==
- Islam in India
- List of mosques in India
- List of mosques in Kerala
- Malayali Muslims
- Muslim chronicles for Indian history
- Muziris Heritage Project
- Baba Ratan Hindi
- Tamil Muslims
