= Andrott =

Human settlement in India

- Location within India Location within Lakshadweep

Geography
- Location: Arabian Sea
- Coordinates: 10.81°N 73.67°E
- Archipelago: Lakshadweep
- Adjacent to: Indian Ocean
- Total islands: 1
- Major islands: Andrott
- Area: 4.98 km^{2} (1.92 sq mi)
- Length: 1.4 km (0.87 mi)
- Width: 4.7 km (2.92 mi)
- Coastline: 10 km (6 mi)
- Highest elevation: 0 m (0 ft)

Administration
- India
- Territory: Lakshadweep
- District: Lakshadweep
- Island group: Laccadive Islands
- Tehsils of India: Andrott
- Subdivisions of India: Andrott
- Largest settlement: Andrott (pop. 11000)

Demographics
- Population: 11464 (2014)
- Pop. density: 2,300/km^{2} (6000/sq mi)
- Ethnic groups: jasari, Mahls

Additional information
- Time zone: IST (UTC+5:30)
- PIN: 682551
- Telephone code: 04893
- ISO code: IN-LD-07
- Official website: www.lakshadweep.gov.in
- Literacy: 84.74%
- Avg. summer temperature: 32.0 °C (89.6 °F)
- Avg. winter temperature: 28.0 °C (82.4 °F)
- Sex ratio: 0.9685 ♂/♀

Andrott Island, (Malayalam: [ɐn̪d̪roːt̪ːə̆]) also known as Androth, is a small inhabited island in the Union Territory of Lakshadweep, a group of 36 coral islands scattered in the Arabian Sea off the western coast of India. It has a distance of 293 km (182 mi) west of the city of Kochi.

== History ==
Andrott Island had been known as 'Divanduru' in the past, a name that is found in some old French maps. It belongs to the Laccadive Islands subgroup, which had been historically a part of the Arakkal Kingdom. It was the first island to embrace Islam.

== Geography ==
Of all the islands in the group, Andrott is the nearest to the mainland, the longest, as well as the biggest in terms of area.

It is located approximately 219 kilometres (136 mi) from Kannur, 234 kilometres (145 mi) from Kozhikode, and 293 kilometres (182 mi) from Kochi. The island has an area of 4.98 square kilometres (1.92 sq mi) and is the only island of the group to have a west–east orientation. It has a lagoon area of 6.6 km^{2} (2.5 sq mi).

== Demographics ==
Most of the inhabitants are Muslims with a presence of Hindu minority. The Saint Ubaidullah who is believed to have preached Islam in Lakshadweep Islands, died here. His remains are entombed in the Jumah mosque.

The island also houses several Buddhist archaeological remains.

== Administration ==
The island belongs to the township of Andrott of Andrott Tehsil.

== Climate ==
Climate data for Andrott
Month	Jan	Feb	Mar	Apr	May	Jun	Jul	Aug	Sep	Oct	Nov	Dec	Year
Mean daily maximum °C (°F)	30.3 (86.5)	30.9 (87.6)	32.2 (90.0)	33.1 (91.6)	32.8 (91.0)	30.5 (86.9)	29.9 (85.8)	30.1 (86.2)	30.0 (86.0)	30.5 (86.9)	30.4 (86.7)	30.7 (87.3)	31.0 (87.7)
Mean daily minimum °C (°F)	24.4 (75.9)	24.8 (76.6)	25.5 (77.9)	26.3 (79.3)	26.4 (79.5)	24.9 (76.8)	24.3 (75.7)	24.9 (76.8)	24.7 (76.5)	24.7 (76.5)	24.1 (75.4)	24.0 (75.2)	24.9 (76.8)
Average rainfall mm (inches)	10.5 (0.41)	2.4 (0.09)	6.0 (0.24)	25.9 (1.02)	130.4 (5.13)	401.7 (15.81)	486.1 (19.14)	238.6 (9.39)	182.2 (7.17)	166.5 (6.56)	129.8 (5.11)	90.2 (3.55)	1,870.3 (73.62)
Source: India Meteorological Department (1965–1979)

== Image Gallery ==
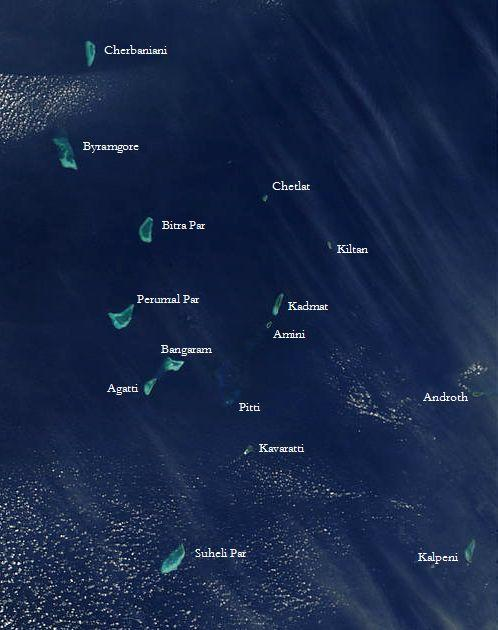
Satellite picture showing the atolls of the Lakshadweep except for Minicoy

Map
