= Imamul Aroos =

Indian Islamic scholar, writer, poet, preacher and reformer

His Holiness Imamul Aroos
- Title: Imam, Allamah Qutbuz Zaman, Al-Siddiqi

Personal life
- Born: 1816 Kayalpatnam, Tinnevely District, Madras Presidency, British India (now Thoothukudi District, Tamil Nadu, India)
- Died: 1898 (aged 81–82) Kilakarai, Madura District, Madras Presidency, British India (now Ramanathapuram District, Tamil Nadu, India)
- Resting place: Arusiyya Tekke, Kilakarai
- Era: 19th Century, Modern era
- Region: South India, Sri Lanka
- Main interest(s): Arabic, Arwi, Tamil, Aqidah, Fiqh, Tafsir, Tasawwuf, History
- Notable work(s): Maghani,Fathud Dayyan,Fathul Matin,Ratibul Jalaliyyah,Minhatul Sarandib Fi Madahil Habib
- Other name: Mappillai Lebbai Alim

Religious life
- Religion: Islam
- Denomination: Sunni (Sufi)
- Jurisprudence: Shafi'i
- Tariqa: 'Arusi-Qadiri
- Creed: Maturidi

Muslim leader
- Disciple of: Kilakkarai Thaika sahib Wali
- Influenced by: Thaika sahib Wali, Sheikh Ahmed
- Influenced: Sahib al-Jalwa Shahul Hamid, Sahib al-Khalwa Abdul Qadir, A. M. Wappachi Marikkar

Imamul Aroos (1816–1898), also known Quthubu zamaan Mappillai Lebbai Alim, was a scholar, writer, poet, preacher and reformer. He was a notable contributor to Arwi (Arabic Tamil) literature. He was the founder of Aroosiyatul Qadiriya tariqa, a branch of qadiri Sufi order.

== Early life ==
Imaul Aroos was born in Kayalpattinam, South India as Sayyid Muhammad. His father was Wellai Ahmadu Alim. Imamul Aroos's family moved to Kilakkarai, South India when he was 2 years old. He is a descendant of the Caliph Abu Bakr, tracing his lineage through Sadaq Maraikkayar, (a companion of Nagore Shahul Hamid), who was a descendant of Muhammad Khalji.

== Education ==
Imaul Aroos memorized Al-Quran before the age of ten and studied Tafsir, Hadith, Fiqh, Tasawwuf and Islamic history and other fundamental religious under his father. Later, Imamul Aroos studied under Taika sahib wali in Kilakkarai. He studied various Islamic sciences under his teacher. He also studied under many great scholars of that time.

== Later life ==
Imamul Aroos married the daughter of his teacher taika shaib and Taika sahib wali grant kilafath (Authority of train and follow Sufi order) to Imaul Aroos. Imamul Aroos inherited the Arusiyyah Madrasah (seminary) from his father-in-law, Shaikh 'Abd al-Qādir al-Kirkari. He renovated the library and amassed a wide collection of manuscripts.

As a young man, Imamul Aroos visited Sri Lanka as a businessman. Compelled by the pathetic condition in which the Muslims of the island had been placed as a result of the oppressive rule of Europeans, he abandoned his business activities and embarked on missionary works.

He visited many Arab countries. When he went to Makkah and Madina, he was honored by notables there, some of whom become his disciples. The display of oratorical and literary talents of a very high degree by this non-Arab, caused astonishment to the Arab intelligentsia. He had been surprised to discover that the copy of his own 'Minhatu Sarandib' had been preserved with reverence in a library in the holy city of Makkah.

=== Social reformation ===
The Muslim Coastal regions areas of Tamil Nadu, like Kayalpattinam and Kilakkarai, were affected the most by the atrocities committed by the Portuguese during the Portuguese rule of Tamil Nadu from 1501–1575 AD. From 1505 to 1658 AD, the Portuguese destroyed almost all Muslim institutions and monuments in Sri Lanka, which was a severe blow to the old grandeur of Muslim culture. They were unable to carry on their social transaction in Islamic Way. In short, they could not live as Muslims.

Imamul Aroos contribute to Islamic revival in Tamil Nadu and Sri Lanka. He was one of notable reformer in his time. He built hundreds of mosques and institutions in Sri Lanka, after destruction of Muslim institutions and monuments during Portuguese rule. According to the record available with the association founded by him in 1848, had been instrumental building over 350 mosques with attached arwi school in Sri Lanka. He has also established several maktabs and built some mosques in India. For each and every such mosque built, both in Tamil Nadu and Sri Lanka. He has composed Arabic poems commending the services of those who helped in the construction and other associated activities. Every one of such stanza embodies chronogram which expresses the year of commencement or completion of the construction.

Despite the journey to remote places such as Marichikkaddi and Karadikkuli being tiresome and dangerous—due to the presence of wild animals and the roads being difficult to walk through—Imamul Arus still managed to visit these areas, constructing mosques and schools in desolate villages.

=== Works of Imamul Aroos ===
Imamul Aroos was one of great Arwi scholar and Contribute Arwi literature. Imaul Aroos alone has produced about 100 large works and about 200 minor works. Some of them given here:

1. Maghani
2. Fathud Dayyan
3. Fathul Matin
4. Ganimatus Salikin
5. Fathus Salam
6. Ratibul Jalaliyyah
7. Talai Fathiha
8. Minhatul Sarandib Fi Madahil Habib
9. Madinatun Nuhas
10. Mawahibullahil Aliyyi Fi Manaqibish Shail Barbaliyyi

== See also ==
- Thaika Ahmad Abdul Qadir
- Thaika Shuaib
- Sheikh Mustafa
- Arusiyyah Madrasah
- Arwi or Arabic-Tamil
- Tamil Muslim
