= Thaika Ahmad Abdul Qadir =

South Indian Islamic scholar (1891 –1976)

His Holiness Thaika Ahmad Abdul Qadir Baqavi
- Title: 'Allama, Al-Siddiqi

Personal life
- Born: 2 October 1891 Kilakarai, British India
- Died: 14 February 1976 (aged 84) Kilakarai, Tamil Nadu, India
- Resting place: Arusiyya Tekke, Kilakarai
- Main interest(s): Arabic, Arwi, Tamil, Aqidah, Fiqh, Fatwa, Tafsir, Tasawwuf
- Other names: (Periya) Shaikh Nayagam, Shamsul Ulama
- Occupation: Academic, Mufti, Philanthropist

Religious life
- Religion: Islam
- Denomination: Sunni (Sufi)
- Jurisprudence: Shafi’i
- Tariqa: 'Arusi-Qadiri
- Creed: Ash'ari

Muslim leader
- Disciple of: Sahib al-Jalwa Shahul Hamid, Sahib al-Khalwa Abdul Qadir
- Influenced by: Imam al-Arus Sayyid Muhammad, Shah Abdul Wahhab
- Influenced: Shaikh Dr Thaika Shuaib, Shaikh Thaika Ahmad Nasir

Thaika Ahmad Abdul Qadir (2 October 1891 – 14 February 1976) was an Indian Islamic scholar, spiritual guide, and Mufti. He was a key figure in acquiring government accreditation for many Arabic Colleges and Madrasas in Tamil Nadu. His contributions were recognised by his contemporaries with a felicitation function on 20 September 1967.

== Education ==
Ahmad Abdul Qadir spent his early childhood in the company of his paternal grandfather, Imam al-'Arus Sayyid Muhammad, who died when he was seven years old. He then received religious instruction from his father Sahib al-Jalwa Shahul Hamid (d. 1921) and his paternal uncle Sahib al-Khalwa Abdul Qadir (d. 1913) at the Arusiyya Seminary. During this period, he also memorized the whole Qur'an.

Following this, he continued his studies at Al-Baqiyat As-Salihat Seminary in Vellore. Here he was under the guidance of the seminary's founder, Shah Abdul Wahab, who was impressed by his ability in studies. Upon graduation at Vellore, he went to An-Nur Al-Muhammadiyya Seminary in Podakkudi where he acquainted with the seminary's founder Abdul Karim.

== Career ==
Following a short stint at the business incorporated by his late paternal grandfather, he returned to the Arusiyya Seminary where he spent the rest of his life teaching and issuing religious edicts. He inaugurated the Uswatun Hasana Association in Kilakarai through which he managed mosques and coordinated social work in the town and surrounding areas in the Ramanathapuram district.

He inherited the mantle of the Arusi-Qadiri Tariqa and played the role of a spiritual guide to its adherents. He headed the various Masjids, Madrasas, Maktabs, Tekkes and associations related to the Arusi-Qadiri around the world.

== Achievements ==
He was instrumental in acquiring government accreditation for many Arabic Colleges and Madrasas in Tamil Nadu and was actively involved in the setting up of many schools in South India. In his last days, there were more than 300 Madrasas and Maktabs under his guidance within the Ramanathapuram district.

== Felicitation function ==
On 20 September 1967, Ahmad Abdul Qadir's services to Islam and humanity was commemorated with a felicitation function in Madurai. It coincided with the 80th Hijri year of his birth. Quaid-e-Millat Muhammad Ismail, Quaid al-Qawm Sayyid Abdur Rahman Bafaqi Thangal, A. K. A. Abdul Samad, Hazrat Ziauddeen (Principal, Arabic College, Podakkudi), Hazrat Rahmatullah (Principal, Arabic College, Nidur) were some of the dignitaries who attended the function.

Dr. T. P. Meenakshisundaram, Vice Chancellor of Madurai University, released a 370-page souvenir in honour of Ahmad Abdul Qadir at the function. It was a life montage of Ahmad Abdul Qadir in Tamil and English prose, together with greetings from luminaries around the world.

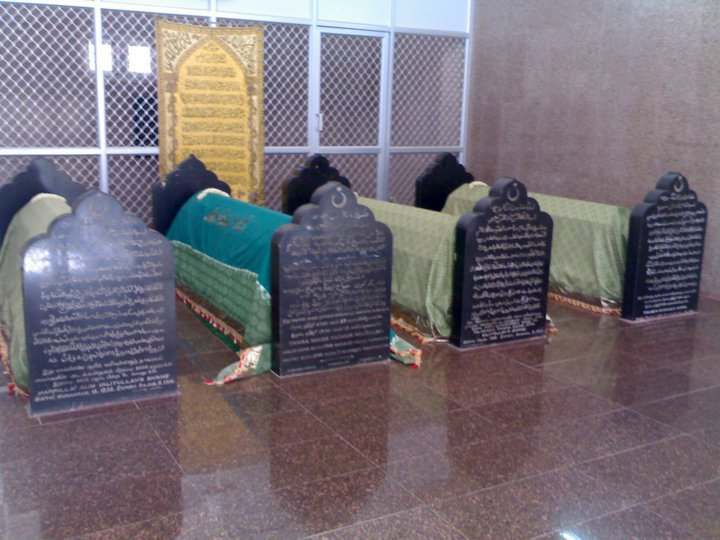
Shaikh Ahmad Abdul Qadir's tomb (2nd from right) at the Arusiyya Tekke

== Death ==
Ahmad Abdul Qadir died after the dawn prayers on Saturday, 14 February 1976, corresponding to the Hijri date 13 Safar 1369. The following day, in the presence of family, friends and disciples, his funeral prayer was led by his younger son, Dr Thaika Shuaib. He was laid to rest at the Arusiyya Tekke. Funeral prayers in absentia were held elsewhere in India, Sri Lanka and the Far East.

== See also ==
- Arusiyyah Madrasah
- Arwi or Arabic-Tamil
- Tamil Muslim
- Imamul Aroos
- Thaika Shuaib
- Qadiriyya
- Shafi'i
- Sufism
