= Labbay =

Languages
- Tamil, Dakhni, Urdu, Malayalam

Religion
- Islam (Sect:-Sunni, Madhab:-Hanafi or Shafi'i)

Related ethnic groups
- Tamil Muslims, Tamil people, Rowther, Marakkar, Deccani Muslims

The Labbays (Tamil : லப்பை, Urdu : لبابین ,ﻟﺐ ﺑﮯ, also Labbai, Labbei, Labba, Labbabeen, Lababeen, Lababin, Lababīn, Lebbay, Lebbai, Lubbye, Lubbee, Lubbe, Lubbay; IPA: [lɐbːɐi̯]), are a Tamil Muslim trading community in southern India found throughout the southern Indian states of Tamil Nadu, Karnataka, Kerala and Andhra Pradesh. The Labbay are a subgroup within the Tamil Muslim community.

Prior to the arrival of the Portuguese in the sixteenth century, maritime trade across the Indian Ocean was predominantly controlled by Muslim merchants. Throughout the coastal regions and their adjoining hinterlands, well-established Muslim communities had emerged, many of which had become deeply assimilated into local cultural frameworks. These groups descend from both migrants and Islamized indigenous populations. Muslims were present in Tamil Nadu and Sri Lanka by at least the thirteenth century, with some traditions and scholarly claims suggesting an earlier presence dating back to the eighth century. In Tamil Nadu, periods of Muslim political dominance further consolidated Islamic influence, as Islam assumed the status of the state religion. These phases involved both increased Muslim migration from other regions of the Indian subcontinent and a likely intensification of conversion to Islam among indigenous populations. Collectively, these historical processes culminated in the formation of a Tamil-speaking Muslim community. In the nineteenth century, British colonial administrators employed the term Labbai as a general designation for Tamil-speaking Muslims, analogous to the use of Mappila for Muslims of the Malabar Coast. This usage appears to have originated among Urdu-speakers and became standardised during the colonial period through census ethnography, which classified Muslim populations using caste-like categories. Although some contemporary Labbais have adopted other languages, such as Urdu, the Labbai ethnonym continues to be widely retained.

The data presented in the Social, Economic and Educational Status of the Muslim Community of India Report (2006) indicate that Muslims in Tamil Nadu are not only among the most socio-economically advanced Muslim communities in India, but also exhibit comparatively strong social indicators when measured against many non-Muslim communities within the state. Other scholars, such as Omar Khalidi, similarly note that the Labbais constitute an economically well-established group.

== Etymology ==
Labbay is derived from the Arabic phrase Labbay'k (Arabic : لبیک ), from a prayer known in Arabic as Talbiyah. Labbay is a surname for Arwi-speaking Muslims in coastal regions, especially Kayalpattinam, Adirampattinam, Kilakarai and Sri Lanka, in addition to many other coastal villages in Tamil Nadu. Labbays identify as descendants of Arab traders who intermarried with local women.

== History ==
The earliest historical evidence of Muslim settlement on the Coromandel coast dates from the ninth century; with an edict in 875 A.D. by the king of Madurai granting asylum to a group of Arab immigrants. Even as the community gained momentum their connection with North India was thin. Like the Mappillas, the Coromandel Muslims became prosperous maritime traders. In later times they took on the appellations of maraikkayar to distinguish themselves from the hinterland Hanafi Labbay Muslims of the tamilnadu

=== Usage and Applications of the term "Labbai" ===
The term Labbai is one of the most semantically complex and potentially misleading labels within the study of Tamil Muslim nomenclature, exhibiting at least three distinct usages across historical and social contexts.

Historically, Labbai has functioned as an encompassing ethnonym for Tamil-speaking Muslims as a whole. This general designation was formalized during the colonial era, where the term was used in census records to categorize this entire linguistic group. This administrative usage contributed to their inclusion in the official listing of "Backward Classes."

In contemporary and more recent scholarly texts, Labbai is frequently employed to denote a specific subgroup within the broader Tamil Muslim community, often delineated geographically from the Rowthers and Marakkayars. Mines notes a general association of the Labbai subgroup with the northern inland districts of Tamil Nadu, contrasting with the Rowther association with the southern inland districts. This spatial distinction is corroborated by District Gazetteers, which primarily mention the Labbai as a distinct group in the northern regions, where the term's application differs from its usage in the south.

The earliest discernable meaning of Labbai appears to have been an honorary title or designation for a religious office, specifically that of Imam. This is consistent with the generally accepted etymology of the term, which derives it from the Arabic formula labbaik (لَبَّيْكَ), meaning "here I am! at your service!" This sacred utterance forms a key component of the talbiyah, recited notably during the Hajj pilgrimage to Mecca. Scholars, such as More, have also pointed to possible linguistic parallels with the Hebrew term "Levi." This early, honorific usage is supported by the fact that the term did not appear in early Tamil lexicons in an ethnic sense. Even into the nineteenth century, the term retained this religious significance; for instance, the prominent scholar Sayyid Muhammad bore the title "Mappillai Leppai" (the Tamil equivalent of the Arabic "Imam al-Arus").

The adoption of Labbai as a general ethnic term for all Tamil-speaking Muslims was primarily an outcome of the colonial period. Its pervasive use in British census records solidified its synonymity with the Tamil Muslim population. This top-down administrative designation was subsequently adopted by Tamil-speaking Muslims in the northern districts, who, due to their proximity and interaction with Urdu-speaking Muslims, adopted the term and became identified with it. This process resulted in the term acquiring its dual function as both a pan-ethnic designation and a label for a specific northern-based sub-group.

=== North Arcot Region ===
The specific Labbai subdivision prevalent in northern Tamil Nadu, sometimes referred to by the endonym Lababīn or the historical term Sahebmars, is noted for its cultural distinctiveness. In the North Arcot district, many Labbais are reported to have descended from migrants from southern Tamil Nadu (with a significant proportion being Rowthers from the Thanjavur district). This group is notable for having adopted Deccani Urdu in the twentieth century and for its significant contributions to both Islamic education and Urdu literature. Colonial-era district manuals characterized this northern community as an orthodox Muslim group demonstrating reformist tendencies and generally possessing a relatively high economic status. They claim their origin to early Arab maritime trade networks with South India. According to their own traditional accounts, the community initially adhered to the Shafi'i school of jurisprudence (madhhab), which is prevalent in coastal regions, before transitioning to the Hanafi school as a result of adopting Deccani cultural influence. But Qadir Hussain Khan noted in 1910 that Labbais in the North Arcot district were largely of Rowther origin, adopting the title/surname 'Saheb' concurrently with their integration into Deccani cultural patterns. They historically appear to have intermarried with the Deccani Muslims of the region. There also seem to have been Marakkayars who had settled in the North Arcot district. Some accounts indicate local conversion due to influence of Sufi saints too.

=== Pulicat Region ===
Before the arrival of the Dutch in the region, the Muslim hinterland traders and Muslim maritime traders and boat makers were part of the same community. They both claimed to descend from Arabs and intermarried with Hindus. While in some regions the title "Labbay" carried a stigma due to it being held by converts, the Labbay traders were able to change its meaning into a title of social and religious superiority.

Since the Labbay traders were the only literate Muslims in the region, they became priests, registrars, and commentators of the Quran. Their role as priests gave them high-status in the Muslim community, and great wealth in their role as traders. They spoke Tamil, but wrote it in the Arabic script also known as Arwi. They previously prohibited intermarriages and common funeral grounds between them and other Muslim communities.

=== Mysore Region ===
In the former Mysore State, the Labbai population was primarily composed of migrants from the North Arcot district. They established themselves as a particularly enterprising class of traders and formed settlements across all the major urban centres of the state.

=== Southern Tamil Nadu ===
The term Labbai is only used for religious officiants in southern Tamil Nadu unlike the broad use of the term in northern Tamil Nadu and the Deccan Plateau.

== Genetics ==
In a population genetics study examining 27 caste/ethnic groups of Tamil Nadu. The study analysed approximately 1,000 DNA samples using 11 mtDNA markers to infer haplogroup frequencies, genetic affinities, and admixture patterns.

Research using mitochondrial DNA (mtDNA) markers shows that the community's genetic landscape is dominated by Haplogroup M (66.6%), a lineage indigenous to South Asia. The presence of Haplogroup N (20.0%) and Haplogroup U (13.3%) indicates significant West Eurasian and pan-Caucasian genetic contributions. Notably, the Southeast Asian marker (Haplogroup F) is entirely absent in this group.

Phylogenetic analysis using Neighbor-Joining (NJ) trees places the Labbai community in a specific cluster (Subbranch D2) alongside other Tamil ethnic groups, most notably the priestly Brahmin communities (Iyer and Iyengar) and the Nattukkottai Chettiar trading community.

An analysis of admixture proportions based on mitochondrial DNA polymorphic markers showed that 15 of the 21 Tamil caste groups contributed maternally to the Muslim Labbai gene pool. This broad range of contributing populations indicates a comparatively wider social and genetic integration of the Labbais within the regional population. In contrast to the other evolved communities examined in the study, such as the South Indian Jains, Anglo-Indians, and Nadar Christians, the Labbais exhibit evidence of more extensive maternal gene flow from diverse caste groups, reflecting the historically wider social reach and influence of Islam in the region.

While the maternal (mtDNA) profile of the Labbai is well-documented in this research, there is a notable absence of Y-chromosome (Y-DNA) data within this specific study. Consequently, the paternal genetic contributions and migration patterns of the male ancestors of the Labbai remain uncharacterized in this context, and further research is required to provide a complete bi-parental genetic history.

== Religion ==
The Labbay are Sunni Muslims. They follow the Hanafi school or the Shafi'i school in fiqh. The Labbay community mostly live in coastal settlements in Tamil Nadu.

== See also ==
- Tamil Muslim
