= Arwi Muslims =

Tamil-speaking Muslims

Arwi Muslims are Tamil-speaking Muslims.

Arwi is an Arabic-influenced dialect of Tamil written with an extension of the Arabic alphabet.

== See also ==
- Thaika Shuaib
