= Arusiyyah =

Arusiyyah may refer to:

- Aṭ-Ṭarīqatu l-‘Arūsiyyatu l-Qādiriyyah, the 'Arūsiyyah branch of the Qādiriyyah path of Islamic spirituality
- Madrasatu l-'Arūsiyyah, the oldest Arabic institution in Tamil Nadu, India
