= Kilakarai Lighthouse =

Lighthouse in Tamil Nadu, India

KILAKARAI LIGHTHOUSE
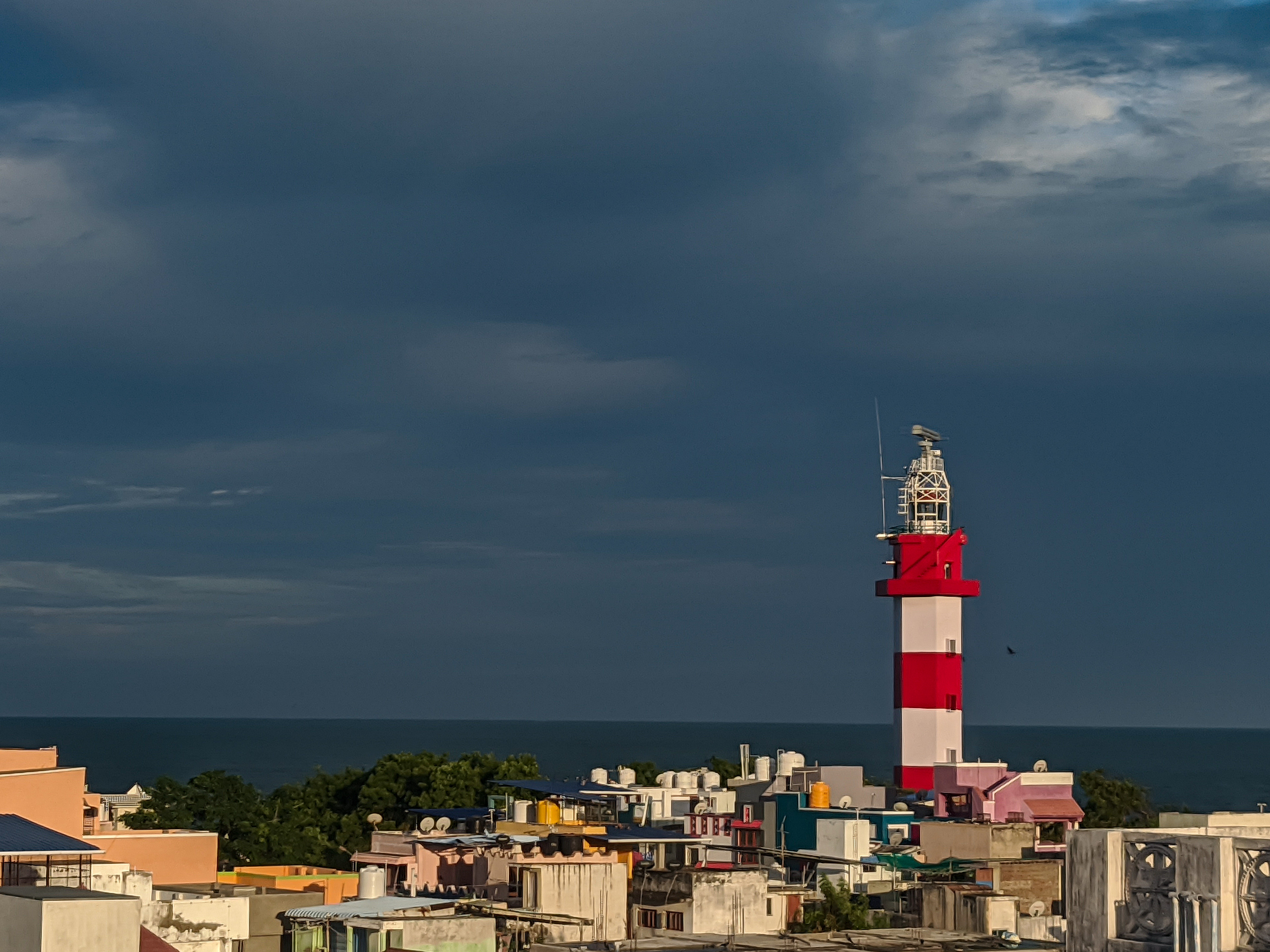
- Location: India
- Coordinates: 9.22757°N 78.78505°E

Tower
- Constructed: 1979
- Construction: concrete tower
- Height: 30 metres (98 ft)
- Shape: hexagonal tower with balcony and lantern
- Markings: white and red horizontal bands

Light
- Focal height: 35 metres (115 ft)
- Characteristic: Fl W 15s.

Kilakkarai Lighthouse is located at Kilakkarai, Tamil Nadu. The lighthouse started functioning on 2 October 1979. There was no lighthouse at this location prior to the installation of the present structure. A flag mast was present at this location previously to assist fishermen. The light source was modified on 30 April 2003. It was commissioned in 1979, is a 30 m‑high hexagonal concrete tower painted in white and red bands, guiding vessels through the Gulf of Mannar’s hazardous shoals. Initially using a paraffin‑vapor burner, its light was electrified in 2003 and upgraded in 2009 to a rotating metal‑halide beacon mounted at 35 m above sea level, visible for 16 nautical miles. Powered by the coastal grid with diesel backup and designed for easy maintenance via dual galleries, it remains a vital navigational aid for local fishing and merchant traffic.

== History ==
Kilakkarai Lighthouse was commissioned in November 1977 by the Directorate General of Lighthouses and Lightships (DGLL) to replace a flag‑mast beacon that proved inadequate for the dense fishing and merchant traffic off Kilakarai. Construction of the 30 m reinforced‑concrete tower set on a shallow raft foundation keyed into the coastal bedrock was completed in February 1979. The light first became operational on 2 October 1979. Initially fitted with a paraffin‑vapor PRB‑42 "C" burner, the lantern was electrified in April 2003 with sealed‑beam lamps and upgraded again in February 2009 to a TRB‑220 rotating beacon with a 70 W metal‑halide lamp. It significantly improved its reliability and luminous range for vessels in the Gulf of Mannar.

== Structure & Technical Specifications ==
The tower is a 30 m‑tall, hexagonal shaft of marine‑grade reinforced concrete, painted in alternating white and red horizontal bands for daytime visibility. It features two concentric galleries, a lower service gallery at the roof‑slab level (300 mm thick) and an upper lantern gallery, both accessed via an internal steel ladder. The current TRB‑220 rotating beacon employs a 70 W metal‑halide lamp and is mounted within a 2.4 m diameter cast‑iron lantern room, its focal plane at 35 m above mean sea level providing a nominal range of 16 nautical miles under clear conditions. Power is drawn from the 440 V/50 Hz coastal grid with automatic switchover to a 15 kVA diesel generator housed in an adjacent service building. All external metalwork is hot‑dip galvanized to resist corrosion in the marine environment.

== See also ==
- List of lighthouses in India
