= Arabi Malayalam script =

Arabic script adapted for Malayalam

Arabi Malayalam Ponnani Script عَرَبِ مَلَیٰاۻَمْ پٗنّٰانِ لِپِ
- Script type: Abjad
- Period: c. 500 to the present
- Direction: Right-to-left script
- Languages: Malayalam (Arabi Malayalam dialect)

Related scripts
- Parent systems: Egyptian hieroglyphics: Proto-Sinaitic; Phoenician; Aramaic; Nabataean; Arabic alphabet; Arabi Malayalam

Arabi Malayalam script (Malayalam: അറബി-മലയാളം, Arabi Malayalam: عَرَبِ مَلَیٰاۻَمْ), also known as Ponnani script, is a writing system — a variant form of the Arabic script with special orthographic features — for writing Malayalam, a Dravidian language in southern India. Though the script originated and developed in Kerala, today it is predominantly used in Malaysia and Singapore by the migrant Muslim community.

Arabi-Malayalam is currently used in most of the primary education madrasahs of Kerala and Lakshadweep by Mappila Muslims.

== Letters ==
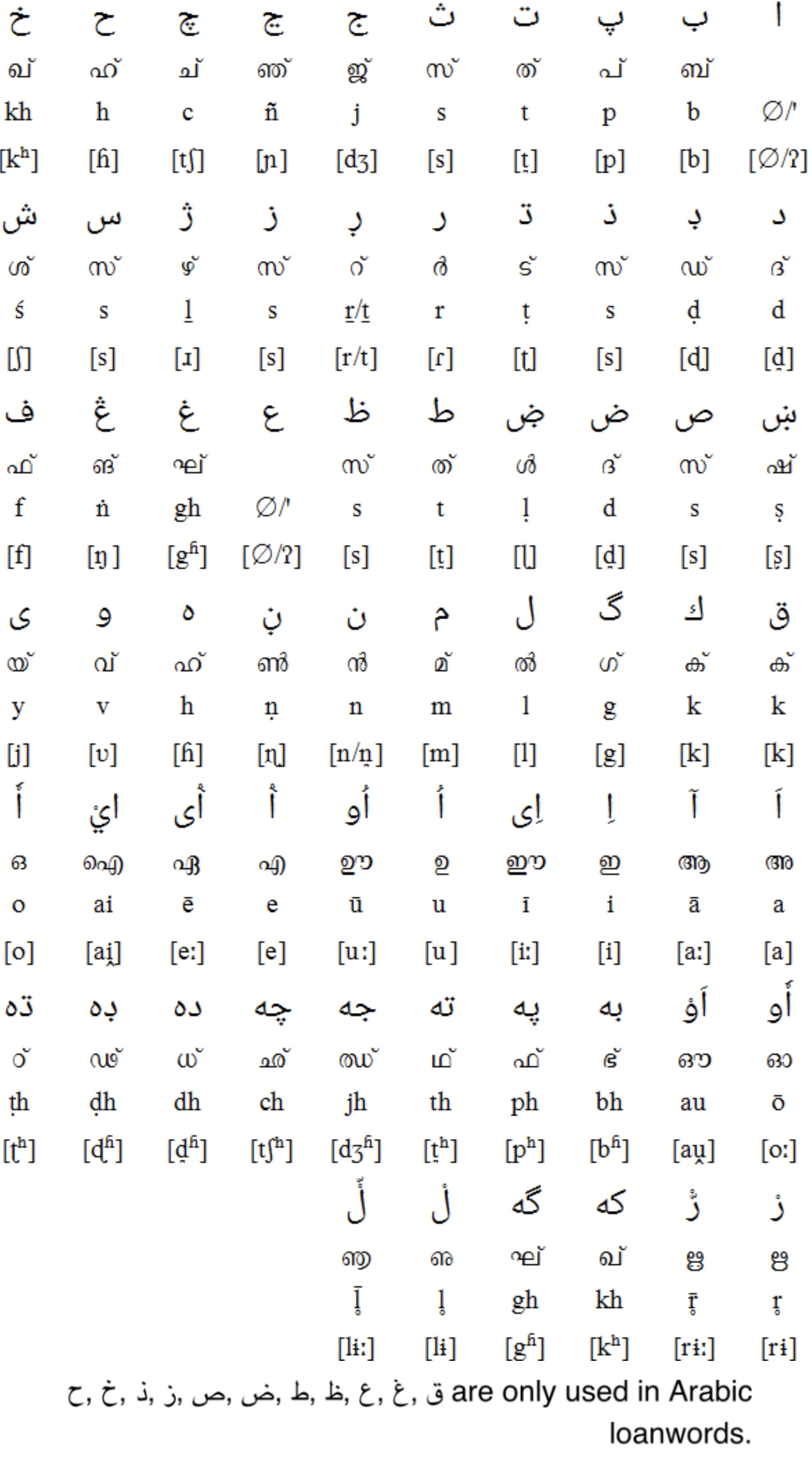
Arabi Malayalam alphabet with Malayalam alphabet correspondences

There were many complications to write Malayalam, a Dravidian language, using letters covering Arabic, a Semitic language. Only 28 letters were available from Arabic orthography to render over 53 phonemes of Malayalam. It was overcome by following the pattern of creating additional letters established for Persian. The letters such as pa, gha, kha, ṅa, ña, ḻa, ga, ca were not available in the Arabic alphabets. The characters which stand for ḻa, ca, pa, ga (ഴ, ച, പ, ഗ) are گ ,پ ,چ ,ژ respectively in Arabi Malayalam.

Malayalam	Arabi Malayalam	IPA
ഴ	ژ	ɻ
ച	چ	tʃ
പ	پ	p
ഗ	گ	ɡ

=== Vowels ===
Arabi Malayalam vowels arranged according to the Malayalam order (right to left)
അ	ആ	ഇ	ഈ	ഉ	ഊ	ഋ	ൠ	ഌ	ൡ
اَ	اٰ	اِ	اِیـ	اُ	اُو	رْ	رّْ	لْـ / لْ	لّْـ / لّْ
—	ാ	ി	ീ	ു	ൂ	ൃ	ൄ	ൢ	ൣ
◌َ	◌ٰـا	◌ِ	◌ِیـ / ◌ِی	◌ُ	◌ُو	◌ْرْ	◌ْرّْ	◌ْـلْـ / ◌ْـلْ	◌ْـلّْـ / ◌ْـلّْ
a	ā	i	ī	u	ū	r̥	r̥̄	l̥	l̥̄

എ	ഏ	ഒ	ഓ	ഐ	ഔ	അം	അഃ	
ا٘ ^{(1)}	ا٘یـ ^{(1)}	اَیْـ / اَیْ	اٝ	اٝو	اَوْ	اَمْـ / اَمْ	اَھْ	
െ	േ	ൈ	ൊ	ോ	ൌ / ൗ	ം	ഃ	്
◌٘ ^{(1)}	◌٘یـ / ◌٘ی ^{(1)}	◌َیْـ / ◌َیْ	◌ٝ	◌ٝو	◌َوْ	◌َمْـ / ◌َمْ	◌َھْ	◌ْ
e	ē	ai	o	ō	au	aṁ	aḥ	∅ / ŭ

Notes

1. Alternatively, historically, the following diacritic has been used for representing Malayalam letters എ and ഏ (romanized as e and ē) and that is اࣣ / ◌ࣣ, اࣣیـ / ◌ࣣیـ / ◌ࣣی (Similar to orthographic conventions in Arabi-Tamil.

=== Consonants ===
Similar to Urdu orthography, Arabi Malayalam alphabet includes digraphs meant to represent aspirated consonants. These are formed by following a letter with the letter he (ھ). While in Urdu, there are two separate letters he, Gol he as an independent letter, and Do-chashmi he as part of aspirated consonant digraphs, this distinction is not necessarily made in Arabi-Malayalam.

Arabi Malayalam alphabet
Arabic (Malayalam) (Latin) [IPA]	ا ‌(ആ) (ā) [∅]/[ʔ]/[aː]	ب ‌(ബ) (b) [b]	بھ ‌(ഭ) (bh) [bʱ]	پ ‌(പ) (p) [p]	پھ ‌(ഫ) (ph) [pʰ]	ت ‌(ത) (t) [t̪]
Arabic (Malayalam) (Latin) [IPA]	تھ ‌(ഥ) (th) [t̪ʰ]	ث ‌(സ) (s) [s]	ج ‌(ജ) (j) [d͡ʒ~d͡ʑ]	جھ ‌(ഝ) (jh) [d͡ʒʱ~d͡ʑʱ]	چ ^{2} ‌(ച) (c) [t͡ʃ~t͡ɕ]	چھ ^{2} ‌(ഛ) (ch) [t͡ʃʰ~t͡ɕʰ]
Arabic (Malayalam) (Latin) [IPA]	ڿ ‌(ഞ) (ñ) [ɲ]	ح ‌(ഹ) (h) [h]	خ ‌(ഖ) (kh) [kʰ]([x])	د ‌(ദ) (d) [d̪]	دھ ‌(ധ) (dh) [d̪ʱ]	ڊ ^{3} ‌(ട) (ṭ) [ʈ]
Arabic (Malayalam) (Latin) [IPA]	ڊھ ^{3} ‌(ഠ) (ṭh) [ʈʰ]	ذ ‌(സ) (s) [s]([z])	ر ^{1, 2} ‌(റ, ഋ, ൃ, ൠ, ൄ) (ṟ, r̥, r̥̄) [r]/[rɨ]/[rɨː]	ڔ ^{2} ‌(ര, ററ, റ്റ, ഺ) (r) [ɾ]/[tː]	ز ‌(സ) (s) [s]([z])	ڗ ‌(ഡ) (ḍ) [ɖ]
Arabic (Malayalam) (Latin) [IPA]	ڗھ ‌(ഢ) (ḍh) [ɖʱ]	ژ ‌(ഴ) (ḻ) [ɻ]	س ‌(സ) (s) [s]	ش ‌(ശ) (ś) [ɕ~ʃ]	ۺ ‌(ഷ) (ṣ) [ʂ]	ص ‌(സ) (s) [s]
Arabic (Malayalam) (Latin) [IPA]	ض ‌(ള, ദ) (ḷ, d) [ɭ], [d̪]	ۻ ‌(ള) (ḷ) [ɭ]	ط ‌(ഥ) (t) [t̪]	ظ ‌(സ, ദ) (s, d) [s], [d̪]	ع ‌(-) (’) [ʔ]	غ ‌(ഗ) (g) [g]
Arabic (Malayalam) (Latin) [IPA]	ۼ ‌(ങ) (ṅ) [ŋ]	ف ‌(ഫ) (ph) [pʰ]([f])	ق ‌(ക) (k) [k]([q])	ك ‌(ക) (k) [k]	كھ ‌(ക) (kh) [kʰ]	گ ‌(ഗ) (g) [ɡ]
Arabic (Malayalam) (Latin) [IPA]	گھ ‌(ഘ) (gh) [ɡʱ]	ل ^{3} ‌(ല, ഌ, ൢ, ൡ, ൣ) (l, l̥, l̥̄) [l]/[lɨ]/[lɨː]	م ‌(മ, അം, ം) (m, ṁ) [m]	ن ‌(ന) (n) [n̪~n]	ڹ ‌(ണ) (ṇ) [ɳ]	و ‌(വ)(ൌ, ോ, ൂ) (v, au, ō, ū) [ʋ]/[au̯][oː][uː]
Arabic (Malayalam) (Latin) [IPA]	ھ ‌(ഹ, അഃ, ഃ) (h, ḥ) [h]	ی ‌(യ)(ൈ, േ, ീ) (y, ai, ē, ī) [j]/[ai̯][eː][iː]				

Notes

1. This letter is also used for representing the semi-vowel ഋ, ൃ (r̥), and when geminated with the shaddah diacritic, its corresponding elongated form ൠ, ൄ (r̥̄).
2. When the Malayalam letter റ is geminated (usually in the form റ+റ, possibly in the form ൻ + റ, but also in scholarly documents by റ്റ, ഺ), in Arabi Malayalam, it is written with the letter ڔّ.
3. This letter is also used for representing the semi-vowel ഌ, ൢ (l̥), and when geminated with the shaddah diacritic, its corresponding elongated form ൡ, ൣ (l̥̄).

== Usage ==
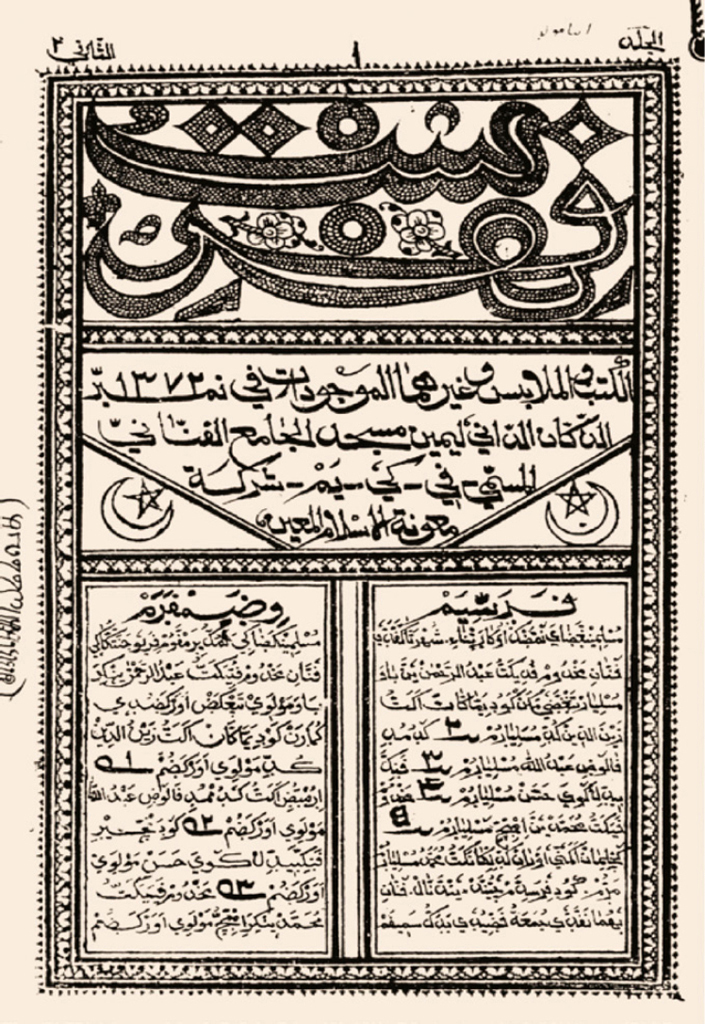
A multilingual advertisement with a catalogue of books and textiles available from a shop in Ponnani in 1908. Text on the left hand side is Arabi-Tamil, text on the right hand side, Arabi Malayalam script

Most of the Mappila Songs were written, for the first time, in Arabi-Malayalam script. The earliest known such work is the Muhyidheen Mala, written in 1607.

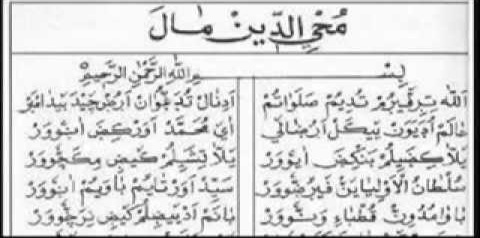
Copy of the first book in Arabi-Malayalam called "Muhyadheen Mala"

Many literary works written in Arabi Malayalam still have not been transliterated to the Malayalam script, and some estimates put the number at almost 90 percent. These works, romantic ballads, folk tales and battle songs, contain some of the impressive literary achievements by Mappilas over the centuries.

The first Arabi Malayalam scripted novel, Chahar Dervesh, Malayalam translation of a Persian work, was published in 1883. Intellectuals such as Moyinkutty Vaidyar translated, and then transliterated significant number of works in Sanskrit - such as Ashtanga Hridaya, Amarakosa, Pancatantra and even the legends about the Hindu king Vikramaditya - into Arabi Malayalam. Sanskrit medical texts - such as Upakarasara, Yogarambha and Mahasara - were also translated, and then transliterated into Arabi-Malayalam by scholars like Abdurahiman Musaliar of Ponnani Putiyakattu. Arabi Malayalam script periodicals made remarkable contributions to the reform movement amongst the Mappilas in the early 20th century.

== Sample Texts ==
Below are several sample texts in Arabi Malayalam orthography, in standard Malayalam Script, and transliterated into Latin as per ISO 15919.

Arabi Malayalam Script	Malayalam Script	ISO 15919 Latin	English
كَلْكّ٘یڹڊَتُ پِژَوُكَۻِّلّٰات٘ كَلْكُّكَ ، كَڔُّكَژِڿّٰالَتِلُرَچُّ نِنِّیڊُكَ	കല്ക്കേണ്ടതു പിഴവുകളില്ലാതെ കല്ക്കുക, കറ്റുകഴിഞ്ഞാലതിലുറച്ചു നിന്നീടുക	kalkkēṇṭatu piḻavukaḷillāte kalkkuka, kaṟṟukaḻiññālatiluṟaccu ninnīṭuka	Do what needs to be done without mistakes, and when it is done, stand up
مَنُۺْيَڔ٘لّٰاوَڔ٘مْ تُلْيٰاوَكٰاشَۼَّۻٗوڊُمْ اَنتَسّٗوڊُمْ سْوٰاتَنْڔّْیَتّٗوڊُۼْكُوڊِ جَنِچِّڊُّۻَّوَڔٰاڹْ. اَنْیٗونْيَمْ بْھڔٰاتْرْبٰھاوَتّٗوڊ٘ پ٘ڔُمٰارُوٰانٰاڹْ مَنُۺْیَنْ وِو٘یكَبُدِّھیُمْ مَنَسٰاكْۺِیُمْ سِدَّھمٰایِرِكُّنَّتْ.	മനുഷ്യരെല്ലാവരും തുല്യാവകാശങ്ങളോടും അന്തസ്സോടും സ്വാതന്ത്ര്യത്തോടുംകൂടി ജനിച്ചിട്ടുള്ളവരാണ്‌. അന്യോന്യം ഭ്രാതൃഭാവത്തോടെ പെരുമാറുവാനാണ്‌ മനുഷ്യന് വിവേകബുദ്ധിയും മനസാക്ഷിയും സിദ്ധമായിരിക്കുന്നത്‌.	manuṣyarellāvaruṁ tulyāvakāśaṅṅaḷōṭuṁ antassōṭuṁ svātantryattōṭuṅkūṭi janicciṭṭuḷḷavarāṇ‌ŭ. anyōnyaṁ bhrātr̥bhāvattōṭe perumāṟuvānāṇ‌ŭ manuṣyanŭ vivēkabuddhiyuṁ manasākṣiyuṁ siddhamāyirikkunnat‌ŭ.	All human beings are born free and equal in dignity and rights. They are endowed with reason and conscience and should act towards one another in a spirit of brotherhood.

== See also ==
- Arabi Malayalam, a dialect of Malayalam used by Mappila Muslims
- Beary language
- Arwi
