= Thaika Shuaib =

South Indian Islamic scholar (1930–2021)

His Holiness, Shaikh Nayagam Thaika Shuaib
- Title: Afdalul Ulema, Alim, Al-Siddiqi

Personal life
- Born: 30 June 1930 Kilakarai, British India (now Tamil Nadu, India)
- Died: 15 June 2021 (aged 90) Kerala, india
- Cause of death: Natural
- Resting place: Arusiyyah Madrasah, Kilakarai, Tamil Nadu, India
- Era: 20th Century, Modern era
- Region: South India, Sri Lanka, UAE, Far East
- Main interest(s): Arabic, Arwi, Tamil, Aqidah, Fiqh, Tafsir, Tasawwuf, History
- Notable work(s): Arabic, Arwi and Persian in Sarandib and Tamil Nadu
- Other names: Shaikh Nayagam ஷெய்கு நாயகம்
- Occupation: Academic, author and businessman
- Website: www.thaikashuaib.org

Religious life
- Religion: Islam
- Denomination: Sunni (Sufi)
- Jurisprudence: Shafi’i
- Tariqa: 'Arusi-Qadiri
- Creed: Ash'ari

Muslim leader
- Disciple of: Thaika Ahmad Abdul Qadir al-Qadiri, Abdul Karim al-Kasnazani
- Influenced by: Imam al-Ghazali, Imam al-'Arus, Tarbha Wale Baba, Pallak Wali.
- Awards: National Award for Outstanding Arabic Scholar

Thaika Shuaib (29 July 1930 – 14 June 2021) was a South Indian Islamic scholar, spiritual guide, and author. In May 1994, he became the first Tamil Muslim to receive the National Award for "Outstanding Arabic Scholar". He was mentioned as one of The 500 Most Influential Muslims in the 2013/14, 2014/15, 2016, 2017, 2018, 2019 and 2020 lists.

== Background ==
Shuaib was born in Kilakarai, South India. He comes from a family of Islamic scholars who have taught the Islamic sciences for centuries. His father, Thaika Ahmad Abdul Qadir (d. 1976) was a scholar and spiritual guide. His grandfather, Shahul Hamid (d. 1921) was a scholar and missionary. His granduncle was the ascetic and poet Abdul Qadir (d. 1913), and his great-grandfather was the renewer Sayyid Muhammad (d. 1316), widely known as "Imam al-‘Arus" or "Mappillai Lebbai Alim".

== Education ==
Shuaib's father took care of his upbringing at the Arusiyyah Seminary, and he was both his teacher and spiritual master. His father gave him several ijazah, or certificates of authority to teach Islamic law. After completing the traditional curriculum, he sat with the scholars of Al-Baqiyat As-Salihat Seminary and Jamalia Arabic College in South India, and Darul Uloom Deoband and Jamia Millia Islamia in North India.

He read Arabic and Persian at the University of Ceylon (Peradeniya). His research of the Arwi (Southern India and Sri Lanka) region earned him a M. A. and then a PhD from the Columbia Pacific University.

== Initiation ==
Shuaib received training from his father in Sufism, until he attained qualification as a murshid and the rank of a spiritual master in the Sufi tradition. He inherited the mantle of the Arusiyya branch of the Qadiriyya tariqa. He further received authorisation from Abdul Karim al-Kasnazani.

== Career ==
Shuaib started teaching Arabic language and Qur'an studies at the Arusiyyah Seminary whilst still at high school. He entered the teaching profession full-time after graduation.

Shuaib is a part of the traditional family business of trading in precious gems and stones.

== Research ==
Shuaib's primary research focus was history of Islam and Muslims in the Arwi region (modern day South India and Sri Lanka). His findings were the bedrock for his master's thesis and research doctorate which culminated in the publishing of the 880-page work, "Arabic, Arwi and Persian in Sarandib and Tamil Nadu – A study of the Contributions of Sri Lanka and Tamil Nadu to Arabic, Arwi, Persian and Urdu Languages, Literature and Education". The book was released by the presidents of 3 SAARC countries in their respective official residences viz. India, Sri Lanka and Maldives.

The book recorded the history and contributions of Arwi (Tamil-speaking) Muslims to Islamic literature, education, propagation and spirituality through Arabic, Arwi, Persian and Urdu. It shed light on their cultural, political and social activities and achievements in their respective countries and abroad. It also featured a critical commentary of the Mawlid composition of Imam al-‘Arus Sayyid Muhammad b. Ahmad Lebbai entitled, "Minhat al-Sarandīb fī Madh al-Habīb".

== Publications ==
Shuaib wrote four major works and seven minor treatises. He published 11 bilingual articles addressing issues in the Tamil Muslim community in the 80's and 90's. His arrangement of the Arusi-Qadiri liturgy "Ratib Jalaliyya" has more than 500,000 copies in circulation while his prayer book "Al Munjiyath" has had 6 printings of 37,000 copies since 2006.

=== Major works ===
- Arabic, Arwi, and Persian in Sarandib and Tamil Nadu: A Study of the Contributions of Sri Lanka and Tamil Nadu to Arabic, Arwi, Persian, and Urdu Languages, Literature, and Education, Madras:1993
- Al Munjiyath: A Panacea for the Body and Soul, Chennai:2014
- ahsanu-l mawa'iz wa azyanu-l malafiz, Kilakkarai:1954
- Ratib Jalaliyya, Chennai, Colombo, Penang
- Morning and Evening Invocations, USA and Singapore:2021

=== Minor treatises ===
- If not for the Prophet ﷺ (English), Kilakkarai:1956
- Sacred Hajj and Pious Ziyara (English), Chennai:2007
- Nithya Kadan – நித்திய கடன் (Tamil), Kilakkarai:1948
- Maanbu Mikka Ramadan – மான்பு மிக்க றமளான் (Tamil), Kilakkarai:1955
- Nabi Thondri Iraa Vittaal – நபி ﷺ தோன்றியிரா விட்டால் (Tamil), Kilakkarai:1955
- Adhan–Iqamattin Sirappu – அதான் இகாமத்தின் சிறப்பு (Tamil), Madras:1995
- Punitha Haj: Azhagiya Vazhimurai – புனித ஹஜ்ஜு : அழகிய வழிமுறை (Tamil), Chennai:2007
- Thirumaraiyil Thiruthuthar – திருமறையில் திருத்தூதர் (Tamil), Singapore:2020

=== Articles ===
- Secular Education vs Religious Instruction
- Schools of Jurisprudence (Fiqh)
- Men Covering the Head
- Congregational Supplication (Du'a)
- Kissing the Thumbs and Wiping the Eyes during the Call to Prayer (Adhan)
- Reciting the Qur’an without Understanding – Will it benefit the Dead or the Living?
- Intercession (Wasila)
- Gifting of Deeds (Isaluth Thawab)
- Innovation (Bid’a)
- Reminding the Deceased (Talqin)
- Vows (Nadhr)

== Recognition ==
On 7 May 1994, the 9th President of India, Shankar Dayal Sharma, presented Shuaib with the "National Award for Outstanding Arabic Scholar" – a first for a Tamil Muslim Islamic scholar.

In 2013, Shuaib was listed for the first time in The 500 Most Influential Muslims by Georgetown University’s Prince Alwaleed Bin-Talal Center for Muslim-Christian Understanding and the Royal Islamic Strategic Studies Centre of Jordan.

On 27 April 2016, the 7th President of Sri Lanka, Maithripala Sirisena, was the guest of honour at a function in Colombo, Sri Lanka, to felicitate Shuaib for his services rendered to Islam and for promotion of religious harmony.

== Death ==
Shuaib died on Tuesday, 15 June 2021, corresponding to the Hijri date 3 Dhu'l Qa'dah 1442.

== See also ==
- Arusiyyah Madrasah
- Arwi or Arabic-Tamil
- Tamil Muslim
- Thaika Ahmad Abdul Qadir
- Shafi'i
- Qadiriyya
- Sufism
