= Arusiyyah Madrasah =

Madrasa in Kilakarai, Tamil Nadu, India

- Latin: Madrasatu l-‘Arūsiyyah
- Motto: ALLAH
- Type: Islamic university
- Established: 1671; 355 years ago
- Location: Kilakarai, Tamil Nadu, India

Madrasatu l-‘Arūsiyyah (Arabic: مدرسة العروسية; Tamil: அரூஸிய்யா மத்ரஸா Arūsiyya Madrasa) is an Islamic educational institution in Kilakarai, Tamil Nadu, India. Founded in 1082 AH (1671 AD), it is one of the oldest centres of Arabic and Islamic studies in South India. The madrasah was founded by Ṣadaqatullāh b. Sulaimān al-Qāhirī aṣ-Ṣiddiqī (1042–1115 AH; 1632–1703 AD) and was associated with the development of Islamic learning in the Arwi region (modern-day South India and Sri Lanka).

Known as Mādiḥu r-Rasūl (Arabic: مادح الرسول, lit. 'praiser of the Prophet'), it is called Appā (Tamil: அப்பா, lit. 'father') by Tamil-speaking Muslims in Tamil Nadu.

In broader discussions of madrasah education in South Asia, scholars describe institutions such as Arusiyyah Madrasah as operating between traditional religious instruction and the demands of modern state‑education systems.

== Extensions ==
The seminary was renovated in 1220 AH (1805 AD) by Shaikh ‘Abd al-Qādir al-Kirkari, who is known as Taikā Ṣāḥib al-Kirkarī (Arabic: مادح الرسول, lit. 'praiser of the Prophet') and Kīlakkarai Taikā Ṣāḥib (Tamil: கீழக்கரை தைகா ஸாஹிப்).

When Shaikh Sayyid Muḥammad (b. Aḥmad Lebbai), known as Imāmu l-‘Arūs (Arabic: إمام العروس, lit. 'imam of the bride') in Arabic and Māppillai Lebbai ‘Ālim (Tamil: மாப்பிள்ளை லெப்பை ஆலிம்) inherited the seminary from his father-in-law, Shaikh ‘Abd al-Qādir al-Kirkari, he renovated the library structure and added to its collection of manuscripts.

== Famous alumni ==
Notable scholars and spiritual guides who studied and graduated from the seminary include:

- Kunaggudi Mastān Ṣāḥib Sulṭān ‘Abd al-Qādir (1215–1263 AH/1800–1847 AD)

Author of over 2,000 lines of mystical poetry

- Shakhuna Pulavar ‘Abd al-Qādir Nainā (d. 1269 AH/1852 AD)

Author of 4 epics in the Arwi language

- Ammāpattinam Yūsuf (d. 1305 AH/1887 AD)

Author of Simtus Ṣibyān and other works of Hanafi jurisprudence

- Imāmu l-‘Arūs Sayyid Muḥammad (1232–1316 AH/1816–1898 AD)

19th century renewer from the Arwi region

- Colombo ‘Alim Ṣāḥib Sayyid Muḥammad (d. 1331 AH/1912 AD)

Author of Tuḥfatu l-Aṭfāl (Hanafi Jurisprudence) and Minḥatu l-Aṭfāl (Shafi'i Jurisprudence)

- Jamāliyyah Sayyid Yāsīn (1307–1386 AH/1889–1966 AD)

Polyglot who compiled the Arabic-Arwi dictionary, Qāmūsu l-‘Arabi wa l-Arwi

- Khalwat Nāyagam ‘Abd al-Qādir (1264–1331 AH/1847–1912 AD)

Author of the prose work on advanced mysticism, 'Ulūmu d-Dīn

- Jalwat Nāyagam Shah al-Ḥamīd (1271–1339 AH/1854–1920 AD)

Missionary who was laid to rest at the ‘’Jannatu l-Mu’allā’’ graveyard in Makkah after dying in Bahrah, a village in Saudi Arabia

- Pallākku Wali Ḥabīb Muḥammad Ṣadaqatullāh (1268–1360 AH/1851–1941 AD)

Spiritual deputy of Imāmu l-‘Arūs Sayyid Muḥammad and author of mystical odes such as Allāh Munājāt

- Shaikhu Nāyagam Ahmad ‘Abd al-Qādir (1309–1397 AH/1891–1976 AD)

Late President of the South Indian Association of Islamic Theologians (Jamā’atu l-‘Ulamā)

- Abirāmam ‘Abd al-Qādir (1287–1365 AH/1870–1945 AD)

Author of Tuḥfatu ṣ-Ṣamadiyya, a commentary on the Khulāsatu l-Alfiyyah by ‘Abdullāh b. Mālik

- Thaika Shuaib (Al-Qadri As-Suharawardi Multani), an Islamic scholar descended from Sheikh Bahauddin Zakaria Multani Suhrawardi who lectures on Sufi Islamic science thought.
