= Arwi =

Arabic alphabet used in Tamil language

Arwi / Arabu-Tamil أروي / عَرَبُتَّمِۻْ
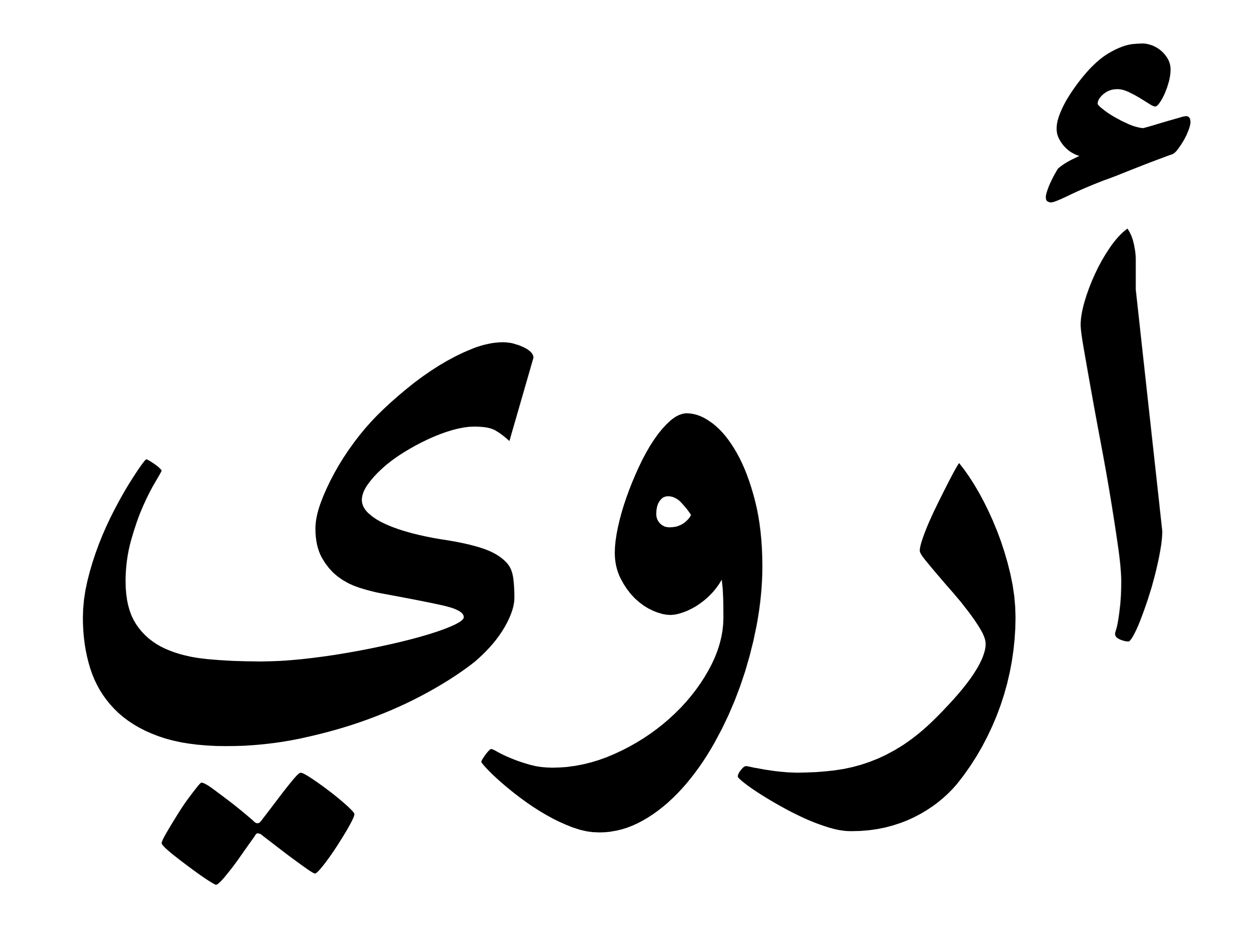
- Arwi written in Arabic Script
- Script type: Abjad
- Period: At least 13th century-present
- Status: Religious uses only
- Direction: Right-to-left script
- Region: India, Sri Lanka
- Languages: Tamil

Related scripts
- Parent systems: Egyptian hieroglyphs: Proto-Sinaitic; Phoenician; Aramaic; Nabataean; Arabic; Arwi / Arabu-Tamil
- Sister systems: Arabi Malayalam

ISO 15924
- ISO 15924: Arab (160), Arabic

Unicode
- Unicode alias: Arabic

Arwi (أَرْوِيُّ ʾArwīyyu) or Arabu-Tamil (Tamil: அரபுத்தமிழ், عَرَبُ تَّمِۻْ Araputtamiḻ) is an Arabic-influenced dialect of the Tamil language written with an extension of the Arabic alphabet, with extensive lexical and phonetic influences from the Arabic language. Arwi has been used extensively by the Muslims of the Tamil Nadu state of India and Sri Lanka. Currently, it is used as a religious language by Tamil Pakistani Muslims, who reside in the Pakistani provinces of Sindh and Balochistan, along with Arabic.

== History ==
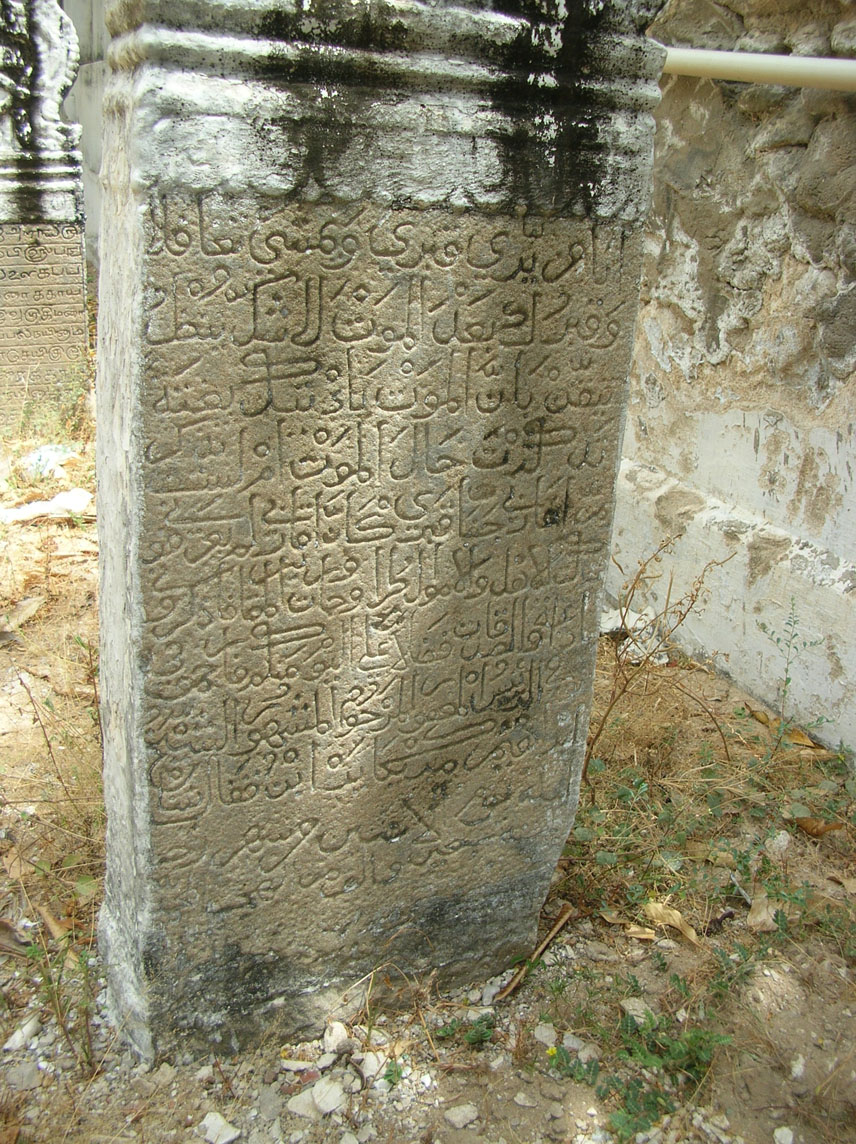
Arwi script in a tombstone at Kilakarai, Old Jumma Masjid

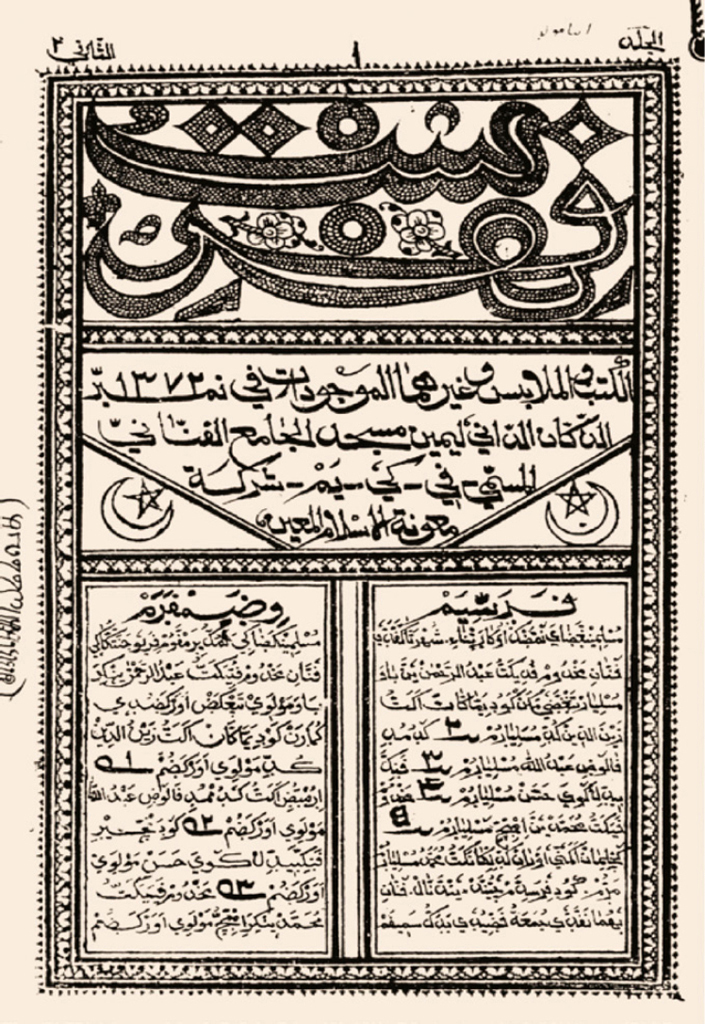
A multilingual advertisement with a catalogue of books and textiles available from a shop in Ponnani in 1908. Text on the left hand side is Arabi-Tamil, text on the right hand side, Arabi Malayalam script

Arwi was an outcome of the cultural synthesis between seafaring Arabs and Tamil-speaking Muslims of Tamil Nadu. This language was enriched, promoted and developed in Kayalpattinam. It had a rich body of work in jurisprudence, Sufism, law, medicine and sexology, of which little has been preserved. It was used as a bridge language for Tamil Muslims to learn Arabic. The patrons of Arwi do not seem to have been highly associated with any political powers of Southern Indian history, including Muslim-ruled states (such as the Deccan sultanates), which were rather influenced by Central Asia and Northern India, preferring the use of Persian, Dakhni and later Urdu. It is therefore a community-based script and dialect, limited to the Labbays and the Marrakayars communities in Southern India, and to the Sri Lankan Moors and the Indian Moors of Ceylon. Many hadith manuscripts have been found. Most of the fiqh books, particularly those of Imaam Abu Hanifa and Imaam Shaafi, have been found in Arwi.

There was also a translation of the Bible into Arwi in 1926.

Arwi still has a place among the more Arwi Muslim and Sri Lankan Moor families.

== Script ==
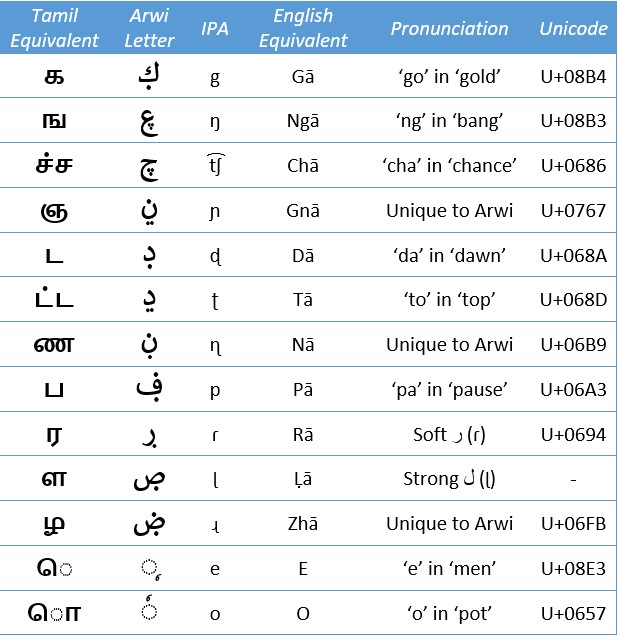

The Arwi alphabet is the Arabic alphabet, with thirteen additional letters used to represent the Tamil vowels e and o and several Tamil consonants that could not be mapped to Arabic sounds.

=== Vowels ===
Arwi vowels arranged according to the Tamil order (right to left)
அ	ஆ	இ	ஈ	உ	ஊ	எ	ஏ	ஐ	ஒ	ஓ	ஔ	
اَ	اٰ	يِـ ^{(1)}	يِيْـ ^{(1)}	اُ	اُوْ	يࣣـ ^{(1)}	يࣣيْـ ^{(1)}	اَيْـ	اٗ	اٗوْ	اَوْ	
—	ா	ி	ீ	ு	ூ	ெ	ே	ை	ொ	ோ	ௌ	்
◌َ	◌َـا	◌ِ	◌ِيْـ / ◌ِيْ	◌ُ	◌ُوْ	◌ࣣ	◌ࣣيْـ / ◌ࣣيْ	◌َيْـ / ◌َيْ	◌ٗ	◌ٗوْ	◌َوْ	◌ْ
a	ā	i	ī	u	ū	e	ē	ai	o	ō	au	∅

Notes

1. Unlike other vowels, and unlike in Persian, Urdu, or Arabic, when vowels i, ī, e, ē come at the beginning of a word (respectively இ, ஈ, எ, ஏ), the vowel carrier is not alif (ا) but is instead yeh (یـ). This spelling indicates the loss of glottal stop in words which start with these vowels, and its replacement by a palatal sound. In rare cases, these vowels have indeed been written with alif as their base.

=== Consonants ===
Arwi alphabet
Arabic (Tamil) (Latin) [IPA]	ا ‌(ஆ) (ā) [∅]/[ʔ]/[aː]	ب ‌(ப) (b) [b]	ت ^{1} ‌(த) (t) [t]	ث ^{1} ‌(த) (t) [t]	ج ‌(ஜ) (j) [d͡ʒ]	چ ^{2} ‌(ச) (c) [t͡ʃ]
Arabic (Tamil) (Latin) [IPA]	ح ‌(ஹ) (h) [h]	خ ‌(க / ஃக) (k, kh) [k]([x])	د ‌(த) (d) [t]([d])	ڊ ^{3} ‌(ட) (ṭ) [ʈ]	ذ ‌(ஜ / ஃஜ) (z) [d͡ʒ]([z])	ر ‌(ற) (ṟ) [r]
Arabic (Tamil) (Latin) [IPA]	ڔ ‌(ர) (r) [ɾ]	ز ‌(ஜ / ஃஜ) (z) [d͡ʒ]([z])	س ‌(ஸ) (s) [s]	ش ^{2} ‌(ச)(ஷ, ஶ) (c, ṣ, ś) [t͡ɕ]/[ʂ~ʃ]	ص ‌(ச) (c) [t͡ʃ]	ض ‌(த) (t) [t]
Arabic (Tamil) (Latin) [IPA]	صٜ ^{4} ‌(ள) (ḷ) [ɭ]	ۻ ^{4} ‌(ழ) (ḻ) [ɻ]	ط ‌(த) (t) [t]	ظ ‌(ச) (c) [t͡ʃ]	ع ‌(-) (’) [ʔ]	ࢳ ‌(ங) (ṅ) [ŋ]
Arabic (Tamil) (Latin) [IPA]	غ ‌(க) (k, gh) [k]	ف ‌(ப / ஃப) (f) [f]	ڣ ‌(ப) (p) [p]	ق ‌(க) (k, q) [k]	ك ^{5} ‌(க) (k) [k]	ࢴ ^{5} ‌(க) (k) [g]
Arabic (Tamil) (Latin) [IPA]	ل ‌(ல) (l) [l]	م ‌(ம) (m) [m]	ن ^{6} ‌(ந, ன, ஞ) (n, ṉ, ñ) [n̪]/[n]/[ɲ]	ڹ ‌(ண) (ṇ) [ɳ]	و ‌(வ)(ௌ, ோ, ூ) (v, au, ō, ū) [v]/[aʊ̯][oː][uː]	ه ‌(ஹ) (h) [h]
Arabic (Tamil) (Latin) [IPA]	ي ‌(ய)(ை, ே, ீ) (y, ai, ē, ī) [j]/[aɪ̯][eː][iː]					

Notes

1. The letter த, representing the sound [t], has been written with the Arabic letter ت in the beginning of word, geminated, or in combination with other consonants. This letter has been written with the Arabic letter ث in between vowels.
2. The letter ச, representing the sound [t͡ʃ~t͡ɕ], has been written with the Arabic letter چ in the beginning of word, geminated, or after a nasal consonant. This letter has been written with the Arabic letter ش in at the beginning of words and in between vowels. The Arabic letter ش also represents the Tamil letter ஷ, representing the sound [ʂ] and the Tamil letter ஶ representing the sound [ʃ].
3. For when this letter is geminated, i.e. ட்ட, some historic manuscripts used the letter dal with two dots underneath, the modified Arwi letter ڍ. But most manuscripts simply used the letter dal with one dot underneath, and with a gemination diacritic, the letter ڊّ.
4. The Arabic letter صٜ has not been used in a widespread manner for representing the Tamil letter ள (representing the sound [ɭ]). Most historic sources use the letter ۻ for this Tamil letter as well as for the Tamil letter ழ (representing the sound [ɻ]).
5. For the Tamil letter க, representing the sound [k~g], the Arabic letter ك is used. Except if this letter is in between vowels, or following a nasal sound, where the letter ࢴ is used.
6. The Tamil letter ஞ representing the sound [ɲ] has usually been written with the Arabic letter ن. In addition, in rare occasions, this sound has been represented by the Arabic letter ݧ. This sound doesn't occur at beginning of words.

== Sample Texts ==
Below are several sample texts in Arwi orthography, in standard Tamil Script, and transliterated into Latin as per ISO 15919.

Arwi Script	Tamil Script	ISO 15919 Latin	English
شٗوْنَࢴَ اِسْلَامِيَ كَّلَاچَّاڔَ نِلَيَمْ (اَمَيْكَّڣَّڊَّثُ) تَࢳْكَۻُكُّ اࣣمَثُ نَلْ وَاۻْتُّمْ سٗوْڣَنَمُمْ كُوْرُوَثٗوڊُ كٗۻُمْبُ كٗوْڊَّيْ بِرِسْڊَلْ وِيْثِ ۲۷ مْ نِمْبَرْ اِلَّمَاكِيَ شٗوْنَࢴَ اِسْلَامِيَ كَّلَاچَّاڔَ نِلَيْيَ ڣُّثُكَّڊِّ ڊَ تِّرَڣُّ وِۻَاوُكُّ ۱۹۶۵-مࣣيْ مَاثَمْ ۳۰ مْ تِࢴَثِ هِجْرَة ۱۳۸۵ مُحَرَّمْ ڣِرَيْ ۲۸ ݧَايِرُ ڣِڔْڣَࢴَلْ ۴:۱۵ مَنِكُّ شَمُࢴَمَۻِكُمَارُ تَࢳْكَۻَيْ اَنْڣُڊَنْ اَۻَيْكِّرٗوْمْ. كَوْڔَوَ ڣِّڔَثَمَڔْ تِڔُ ڊَڊْلِيْ سࣣينَانَايَࢴَ اَوَڔْكَۻْ ݧَاڣَࢴَاڔْتَّ ڣَّلَكَيْيَيْ تِّڔَيْنِیْكَّمْ شࣣيوَاڔْكَۻْ نِلَيَتَّلَیْوَڔْ جَنَابْ سࣣيرْ رَازِقْ فَڔِيدْ اَوَڔْكَۻْ ڣُثُكَّڊِّڊَتَّيْ تِّرَنْتُ وَيْڣَّاڔْكَۻْ.	சோனக இஸ்லாமிய கலாச்சார நிலையம் (அமைக்கப்பட்டது) தங்களுக்கு எமது நல்வாழ்தும் சோபனமும் கூறுவதோடு கொழும்பு கோட்டை பிரிஸ்டல் வீதி, 27 ஆம் நம்பர் இல்லமாகிய இஸ்லாமிய கலாச்சார நிலைய புதுக்கட்டிட திறப்பு விழாவிற்கு 1965, மே மாதம் 30 ஆம் தேதி, ஹிஜ்ரா 1385 முஹர்ரம் 28 பிறை ஞாயிறு பிற்பகல் 4:15 மணிக்கு சங்கமிக்குமாறு தங்களை அன்புடன் அழைக்கி றோம். கெளரவ பிரதமர் திரு டட்லி சோனானாயக அவர்கள் ஞாபகார்த்த பலதையை திரை நீக்கம் செய்வார்கள். தலைமை நிலையத் தலைவர் ஜனைப் கர் ராஜிக் ஃபரீத் அவர்கள் புதுச்சட்டிடத்தை திறந்து வைப்பார்கள்.	Cōṉaka islāmiya kalāccāra nilaiyam (amaikkappaṭṭatu) Taṅkaḷukku ematu nalvāḻtum cōpaṉamum kūṟuvatōṭu koḻumpu kōṭṭai pirisṭal vīti, 27 ām nampar illamākiya islāmiya kalāccāra nilaiya putukkaṭṭiṭa tiṟappu viḻāviṟku 1965 iṟappu viḻāviṟku 1965, mē mātam 30 ām tēti, hijrā 1385 muharram 28 piṟai ñāyiṟu piṟpakal 4:15 Maṇikku caṅkamikkumāṟu taṅkaḷai aṉpuṭaṉ aḻaikki ṟōm. Keḷarava piratamar tiru Ṭaṭli Cōṉāṉāyaka avarkaḷ ñāpakārtta palataiyai tirai nīkkam ceyvārkaḷ. Talaimai nilaiyat talaivar jaṉaip kar rāziq farīd avarkaḷ putuccaṭṭiṭattai tiṟantu vaippārkaḷ.	Sonaga Islamic Cultural Centre (Established) We send you our felicitations, greetings and cordially invite you to attend the opening ceremony of our new building at No. 27 Bristol Street, Fort, Colombo, on the 30th May, 1965, the 28th Day of Muharram 1385, Sunday afternoon, 4:15 pm. Honourable Prime Minister Mr. Dudley Senanayake will unveil the commemoration block. The President of the centre, Sir Razik Fareed will open the building.
يࣣنَّيَّاۻُمْ وَلّٗوْنࣣيْ يࣣيْࢴَآنْتَ نَاثَا تَنَّيَّرِيُمْ تَوَتَّيْ تَّنْتَاۻْكُوَايْنِيْ	என்னை ஆளும் வல்லோனே ஏகாந்த நாதா தன்னை அறியும் தவத்தை தந்தாள்குவாய் நீ	Eṉṉai āḷum vallōṉē ēkānta nātā Taṉṉai aṟiyum tavattai tantāḷkuvāy nī	O Almighty Who rules over me! O my Master who is the only Lord! Bless me with the boon of realizing the insignificance of myself
اُنَّيَّلَّاثُ وࣣيْرُيَارَيْ وِۻِڣّࣣيْنْ يࣣنَّيْ وِڊُّمْ حَقَّاࢴَ اُنِّلْ اٗۻِڣّࣣيْنْ	உன்னை அல்லாது வேறு யாரை விளிப்பேன் என்னை விட்டும் ஹக்காக உன்னில் ஒளிப்பேன்	Uṉṉai allātu vēṟu yārai viḷippēṉ Eṉṉai viṭṭum hakkāka uṉṉil oḷippēṉ	Whom can I beseech except Thee! I will [leave my wretched self and] annihilate in Thee!
مَنِتَڣْ ڣِرَوِيِنَڔْ شَࢴَلَڔُم شُتَنْتِڔَمَاكَوࣣيْ ڣِرَكِّنْرَنَڔْ؛ اَوَڔْكَۻْ مَثِڣِّلُک اُڔِمَيْࢴَۻِلُمْ شَمَمَانَوَڔْكَلْ. اَوَڔْكَۻْ نِيَايَتَّيْيُمْ مَنَشَاڊْچِيَيْيُمْ يِيَرْڣَڹْڣَاكَڣْ ڣࣣرَّوَڔْكَۻْ. اَوَڔْكَۻْ اٗڔُوَڔُڊَنٗڔُوَرْ شَࢴٗوْثَڔَ اُنَڔْوُڣْ ڣَاࢳْكِلْ نَڊَنْتُࢴٗۻَّلْ وࣣيْڹْڊُمْ.	மனிதப் பிறவியினர் சகலரும் சுதந்திரமாகவே பிறக்கின்றனர்; அவர்கள் மதிப்பிலும் உரிமைகளிலும் சமமானவர்கள். அவர்கள் நியாயத்தையும் மனசாட்சியையும் இயற்பண்பாகப் பெற்றவர்கள். அவர்கள் ஒருவருடனொருவர் சகோதர உணர்வுப் பாங்கில் நடந்துகொள்ளல் வேண்டும்.	Maṉitap piṟaviyiṉar cakalarum cutantiramākavē piṟakkiṉṟaṉar; avarkaḷ matippilum urimaikaḷilum camamāṉavarkaḷ. Avarkaḷ niyāyattaiyum maṉacāṭciyaiyum iyaṟpaṇpākap peṟṟavarkaḷ. Avarkaḷ oruvaruṭaṉoruvar cakōtara uṇarvup pāṅkil naṭantukoḷḷal vēṇṭum.	All human beings are born free and equal in dignity and rights. They possess conscience and reason. Therefore, everyone should act in a spirit of brotherhood towards each other.

== See also ==
- Jawi Alphabets
- Swahili language
- Arabi Malayalam
- Arabic Script
