= Kilakarai =

Town in Tamil Nadu, India

- Town
- Location in Tamil Nadu, India
- Coordinates: 9.23135°N 78.7844°E
- Country: India
- State: Tamil Nadu
- District: Ramanathapuram
- Taluka: Kilakarai

Government
  - Type: Second Grade Municipality
  - Body: Municipality of kilakarai
  - Vice Chairman: V. S. Hameed Sultan

Area
  - Total: 7.5 km^{2} (2.9 sq mi)
  - Rank: 5
- Elevation: 17 m (56 ft)

Population (2021)
  - Total: 60,000 (approx.)
  - Rank: 2
  - Density: 8,000/km^{2} (21,000/sq mi)
- Demonym: Kilakaraian

Languages
  - Official: Tamil
- Time zone: UTC+5:30 (IST)
- PIN: 623 517
- Telephone code: 91 4567
- Vehicle registration: TN 65
- Distance from Chennai: 558 kilometres (347 mi) S
- Distance from Bengaluru: 539 kilometres (335 mi) S
- Distance from Madurai: 132 kilometres (82 mi) E
- Distance from Ramanathapuram: 18 kilometres (11 mi) S
- Distance from Coimbatore: 365 kilometres (227 mi) W
- Distance from Tuticorin: 121 kilometres (75 mi) N
- Distance from Tiruchirappalli: 229 kilometres (142 mi) S
- Climate: BSh (Köppen)
- Precipitation: 909 millimetres (35.8 in)
- Avg. summer temperature: 31 °C (88 °F)
- Avg. winter temperature: 24 °C (75 °F)

Kilakarai (alternatively spelled Kilakkarai or Keelakarai) is a town in Ramanathapuram district in the Indian state of Tamil Nadu. As of 2021, the town has a population of approximately 60,000. Known for its rapid development, Kilakarai is one of the fastest-growing talukas in the Ramanathapuram district. The town is also home to a number of prestigious businessmen and entrepreneurs who have made their mark globally.

== History ==
Kilakarai is an eastern coastal town and a port, located in southern Tamil Nadu. It was a flourishing seaport and a gateway to places as far as Madurai until the early 20th century. The famous pearl belt known as the Gulf of Mannar in the Bay of Bengal is dotted with small islands Appa Tivu, Nallathanni Theevu, Shuli Tivu, Uppu Tanni Tivu, Talari Tivu and Musal Tivu. The coastal line of Kilakarai is formed by a series of small bays and coral reefs sheltering the town from the ocean. It was also called as "Quilicare", kirkari, Sembi Nadu, Korkai, Powthira Manicka Pattinam, "Kelikkarai", "Ninathaan mudithaan pattinam", "Seppi Nadu", "lebbat pattan" (pattan mentioned in voyages of Ibn Battuta & map displayed in Ibn Battuta Mall). A strong cultural connection exists between Kayalpatnam, Adirampattinam and Kilakarai.

The prime occupations of the people were pearl, conch, sea trade and transport. The mid-20th century saw a decline in the occupations of the people of Kilakarai, with the advent of surface transport the merchant shipping fleets declined and Kilakarai aka Killikare ceased to be a harbour and port. The cultured pearl industry and dragnet fishing that destroyed the coral reefs choked the once robust pearl trade, or Muthu Salabam.

Kilakarai's pearls, conch (sangu) and coral (pavazham) industries played a vital role in the local economy. However, these industries declined due to environmental regulations and conservation laws. The Indian Wild Life (Protection) Act, 1972 classified corals and certain conch species under protected categories, prohibiting their extraction and trade. Additionally, the establishment of the Gulf of Mannar Marine National Park and stringent Coastal Regulation Zone (CRZ) rules further restricted traditional harvesting practices, impacting the livelihoods of pearl divers, fishermen and traders in the region.

Kilakarai is renowned for its communal harmony. The majority of the population here is Muslim with people of other faith Hindu, Christians living together. The communal harmony that always existed is best exemplified by the famous Rameswaram Ramanathaswamy Temple and Kilakarai Jumma Pallivasal (Vallal Seethakathi is interred here) at Kilakarai, while the architecture is the same the workforce was provided by the erstwhile ruler Sethupathi of Ramnad and most of the materials for both the edifice were supplied by the Kilakarai merchant navies. The town is reminiscent of Spanish Moorish architecture and is located about 60 km south west of the temple town of Rameswaram.

It has the oldest mosque in India known as the Palaiya Kuthba Palli. It has a unique pre-Islamic heritage of more than 1300 years.

The migration of the people after the decline of the marine trade and industry resulted in people exploring the other parts of the globe. Kilakarai has a large expatriate population and a high literacy rate. This has enabled the people of Kilakarai to span the globe and become active merchants in the Middle and Far East, US and European markets.

The 1970s decline of marine trade resulted in people migrating to other countries for business and jobs.

Kilakarai has long been a destination of cultural, historical, and spiritual significance. It was constituted as a panchayat in the year 1885. As per G.O. No. 1157LN, date: 3 December 1885. It has since been upgraded as a Special Town Panchayat as per Director of Town Panchayat, Madras as per G.O. No. 1481/82/J5, Dated on 25 January 1982 and then upgraded as per G.O. No. 300 and 301 Dated on 24 August 2004 as a Third Grade Municipality.

The Muslim community of Kilakarai is philanthropic in nature, providing continuous assistance to the downtrodden sections of society. There are more than 20 schools and colleges in this town, where education was provided irrespective of Caste, creed or religion by the community. Literacy rates in Kilakarai is much higher than the national and even State averages.

Hameedia High School founded in 1940s beside the old Arabic Madrasa Aroosiya Thaika, was a catalyst to more graduates from Kilakarai. With the arrival of Mohamed Sathak Engineering College and then the Thassim Beevi Abdul Kader College for Women the number of graduates from this traditional town has seen a steady rise.

== Demographics ==
Religious census
| Religion | Percent(%) |
| Muslims | 79.92% |
| Hindus | 17.60% |
| Christian | 1.16% |
| Sikh | 0.01% |
| Jain | 0.00% |
| Not stated | 1.31% |

According to 2011 census, Keelakarai had a population of 38,355 with a sex-ratio of 948 females for every 1,000 males, much above the national average of 929. A total of 4,391 were under the age of six, constituting 2,204 males and 2,187 females. Scheduled Castes and Scheduled Tribes accounted for 2.83% and .% of the population respectively. The average literacy of the town was 82.63%, compared to the national average of 72.99%. The town had a total of : 7448 households. There were a total of 12,033 workers, comprising 29 cultivators, 47 main agricultural labourers, 165 in house hold industries, 10,765 other workers, 1,027 marginal workers, 15 marginal cultivators, 18 marginal agricultural labourers, 38 marginal workers in household industries and 956 other marginal workers. As per the religious census of 2011, Keelakarai had 79.92% Muslims, 17.6% Hindus, 1.16% Christians, 0.01% Sikhs, 0.01% Jains, and 1.31% following other religions.

== Educational institutions ==
=== Schools ===
- Hairathul Jalaliah Higher Secondary School – East street
- Magdoomiah Higher Secondary School – OJM Street
- Kannadi Vappa International School – Kanjirangudi
- Hameediah Matriculation Higher Secondary School – West Street
- Islamiah Matriculation Higher secondary school – South Street
- Islamiah High School – South Street
- Mohaideeniah Matriculation Higher secondary school – North street
- Sathakathun Jariyah Middle School – Middle Street
- Hameediyah Boys Higher Secondary School – Mulluvadi
- Hameediyah Girls Higher Secondary School – West Street
- Hameediah Primary School – West Street . founded in 1870
- Nooraniah Matriculation School – New Street
- Dheeniyah Matriculation Higher Secondary School – East Street
- Pearl Matriculation School – Kilakarai
- Al Bayyinah Matriculation School – East Street
- P.s.Subramanian Jayalakshmi Nadar Matriculation School - Kilakarai

=== Colleges ===
- Mohamed Sathak Engineering College
- Thassim Beevi Abdul Kader College for Women
- Syed Hameedha Arts and Science College
- Mohamed Sathak Polytechnic College
- Mohamed Sathak I.T.I (Industrial Training Institute)
- Arusiyyah Arabic College
- Syed Hameedha Arabic College
- Bukhari Aalim Arabic College

== Photo gallery ==
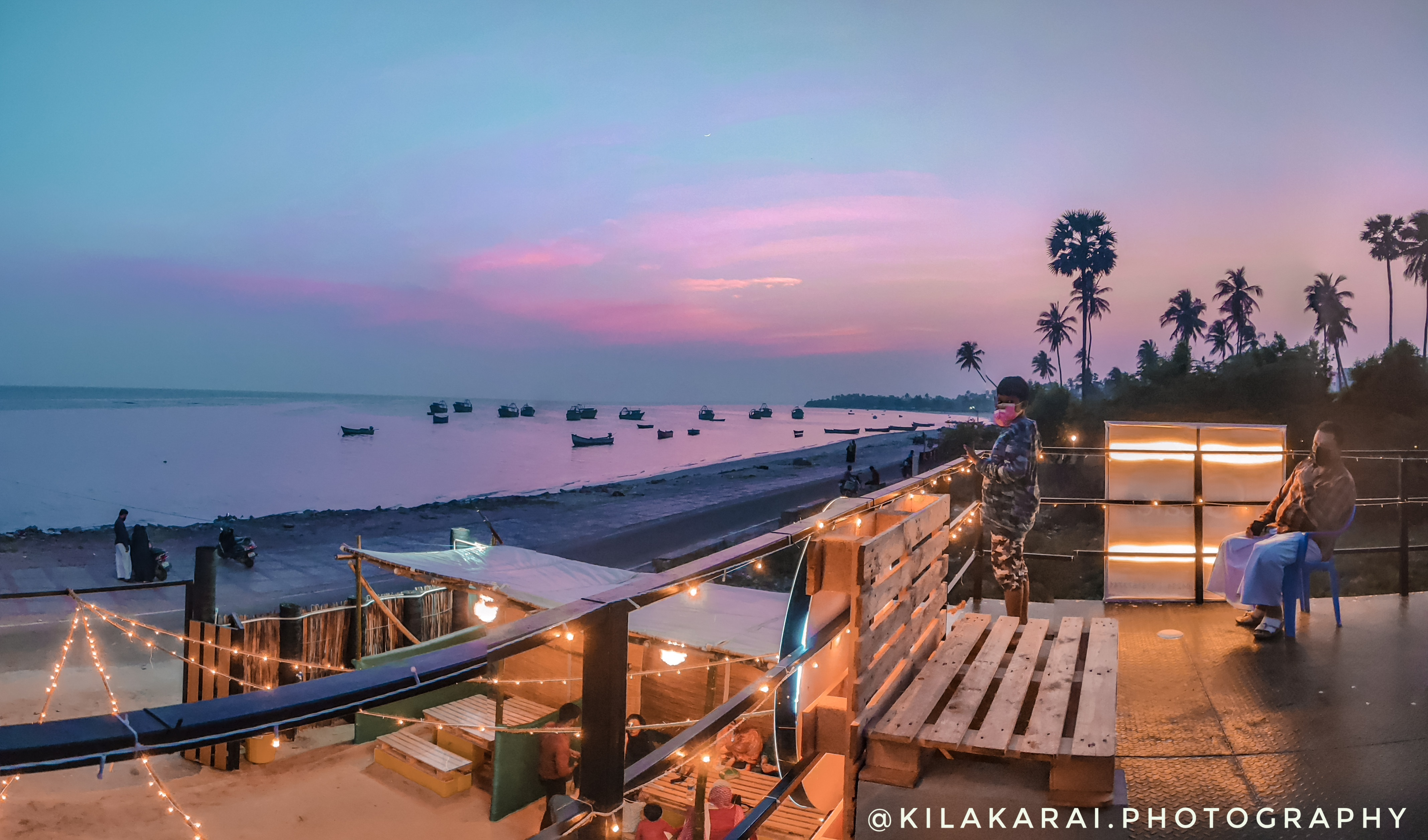
KILAKARAI STONE BEACH

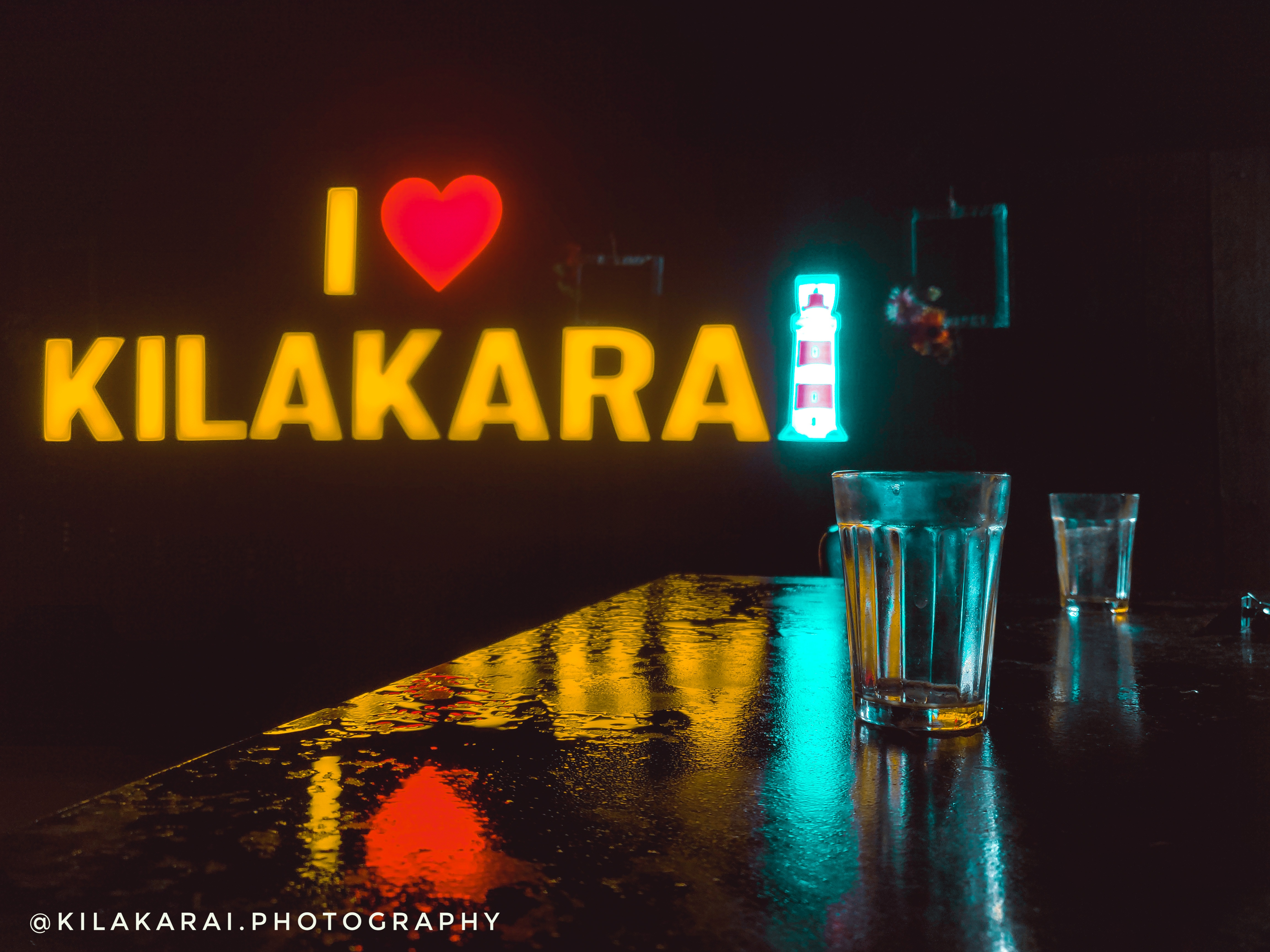
I LOVE KILAKARAI

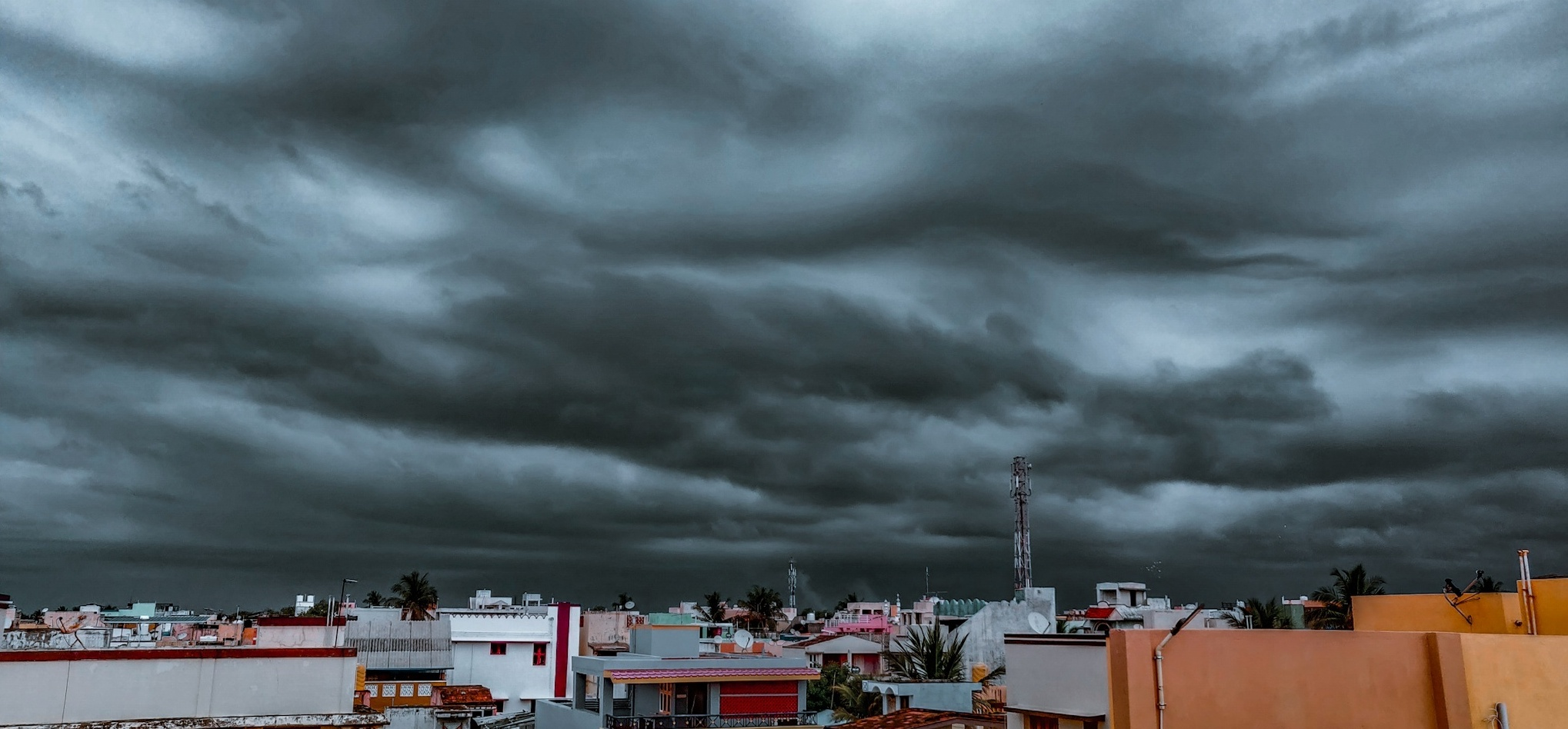
KILAKARAI STREET VIEW

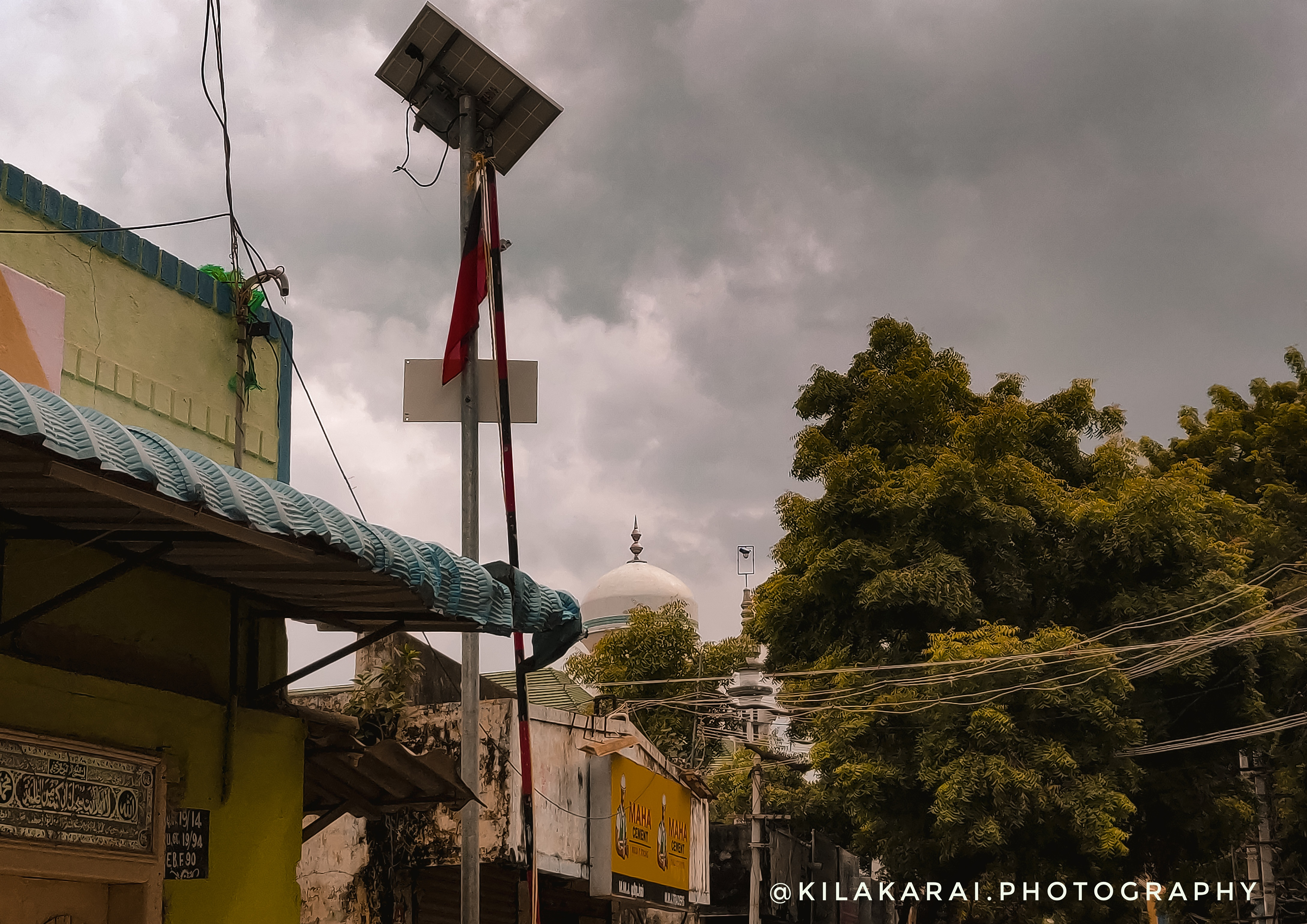
KILAKARAI MOSQUE

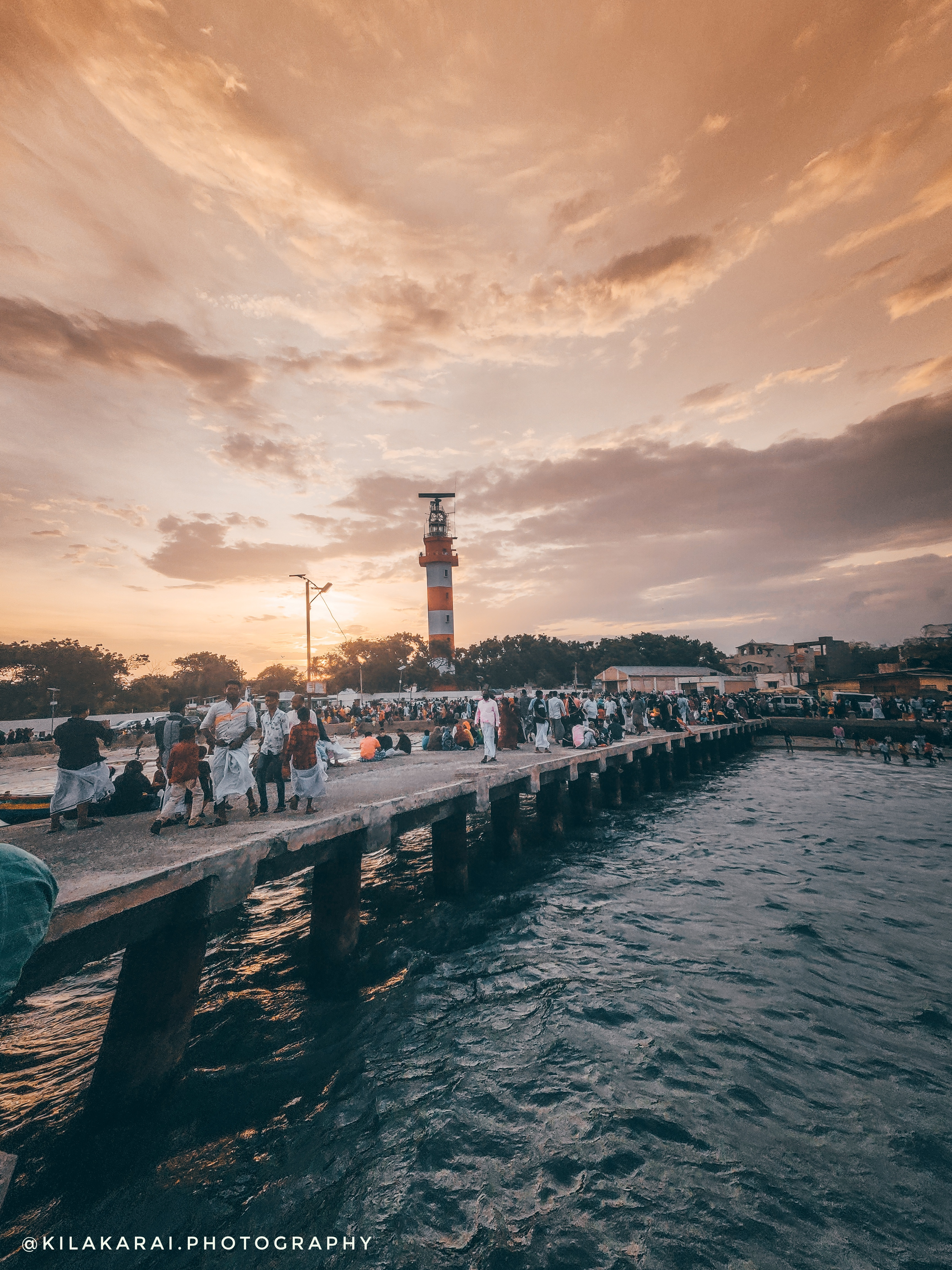
EID CELEBRATION AT KILAKARAI

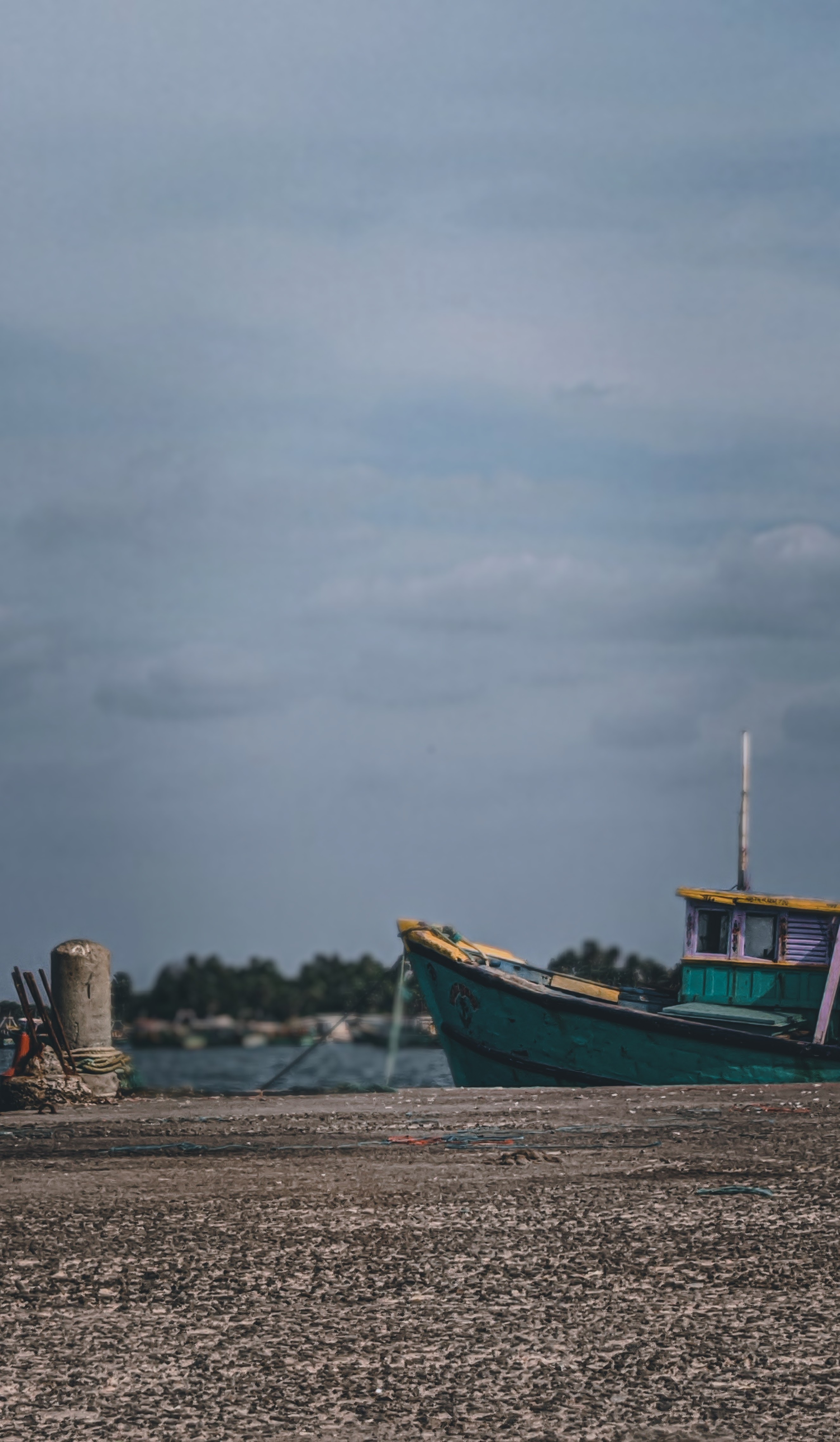
KILAKARAI OLD BRIDGE

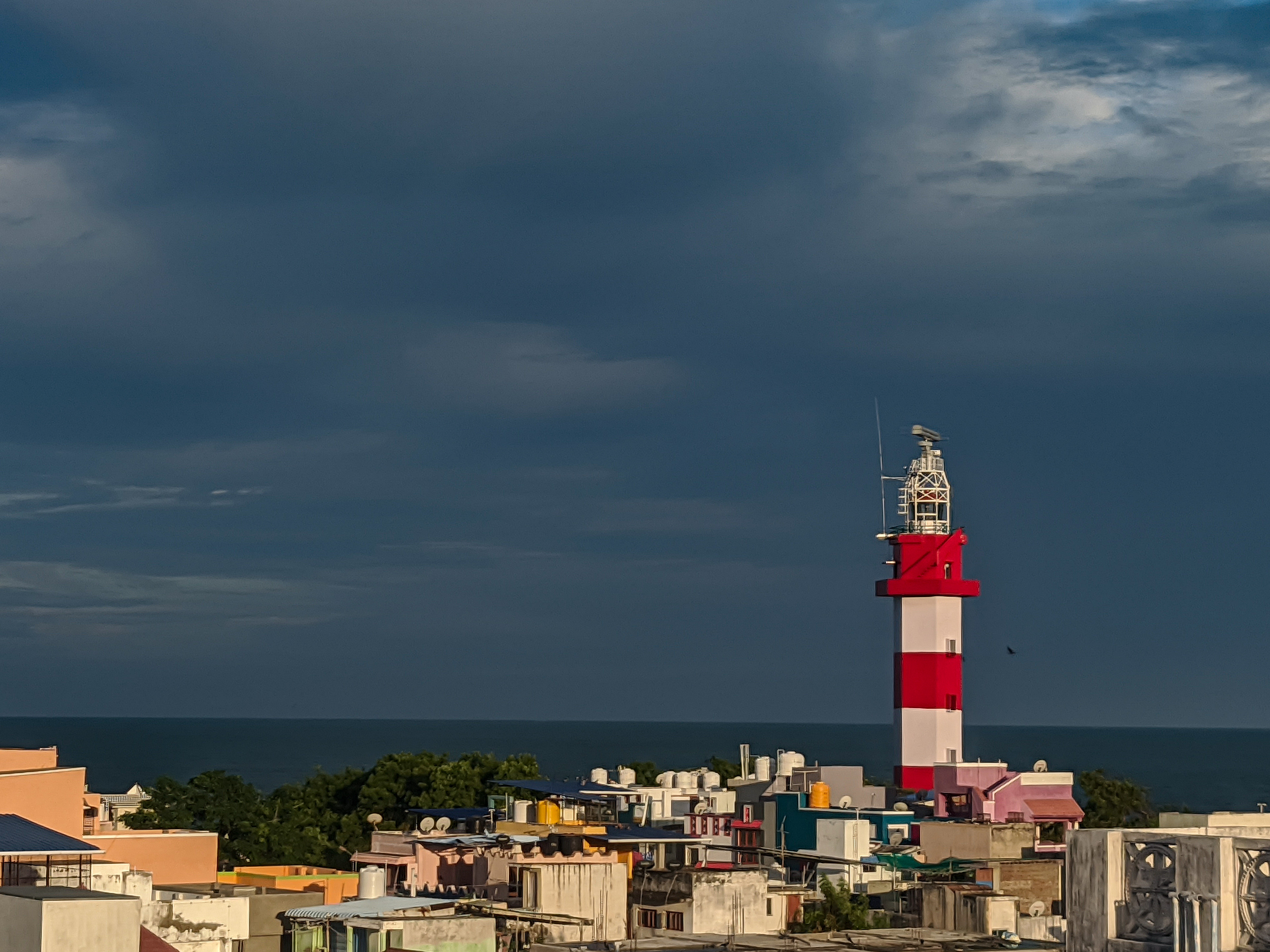
KILAKARAI LIGHTHOUSE

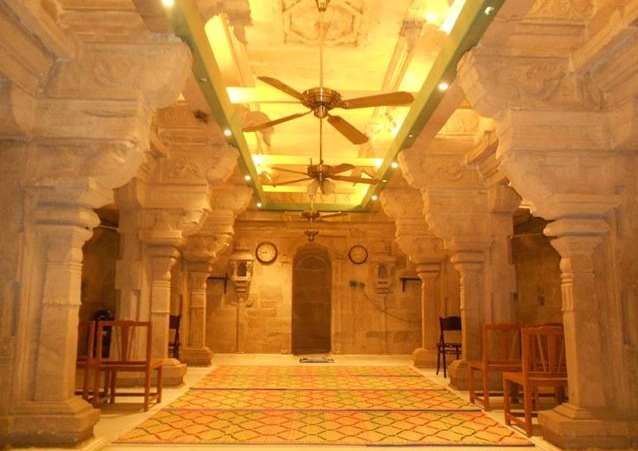
Interior of Odakarai Palli (masjid)

Odakarai Palli (masjid) under conservation

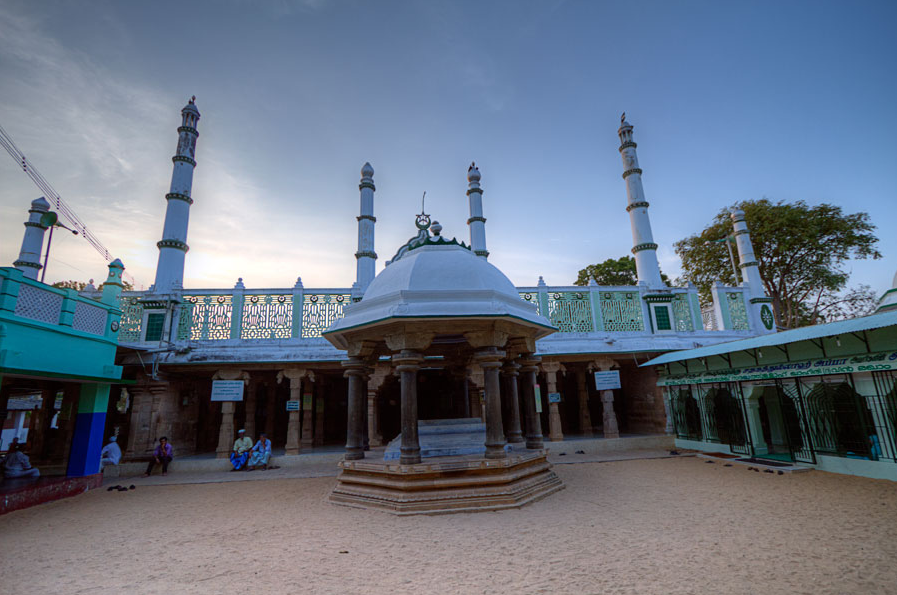
Masjid ul Jamiah

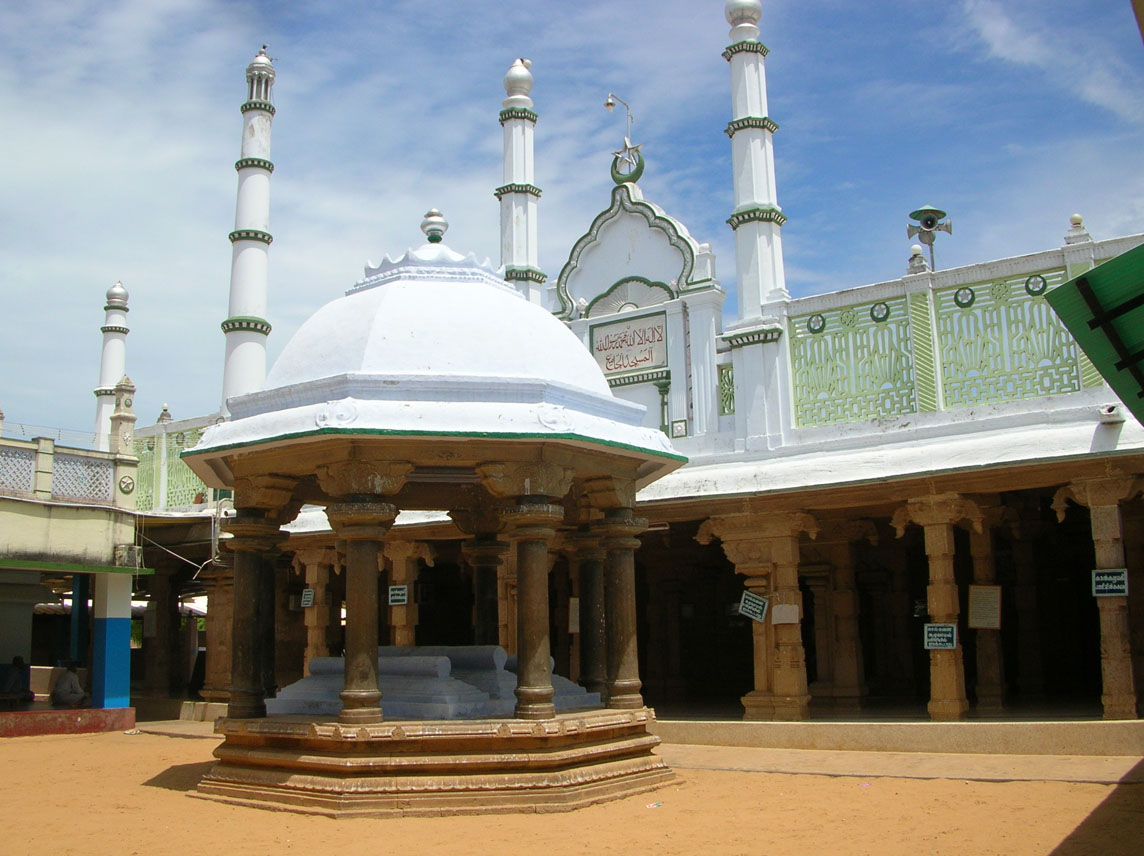
Masjid ul Jamiah (3rd oldest masjid of Kilakarai)

Masjid ul Jamiah

Corridor in Masjid ul Jamiah

Interior of Masjid ul Jamiah

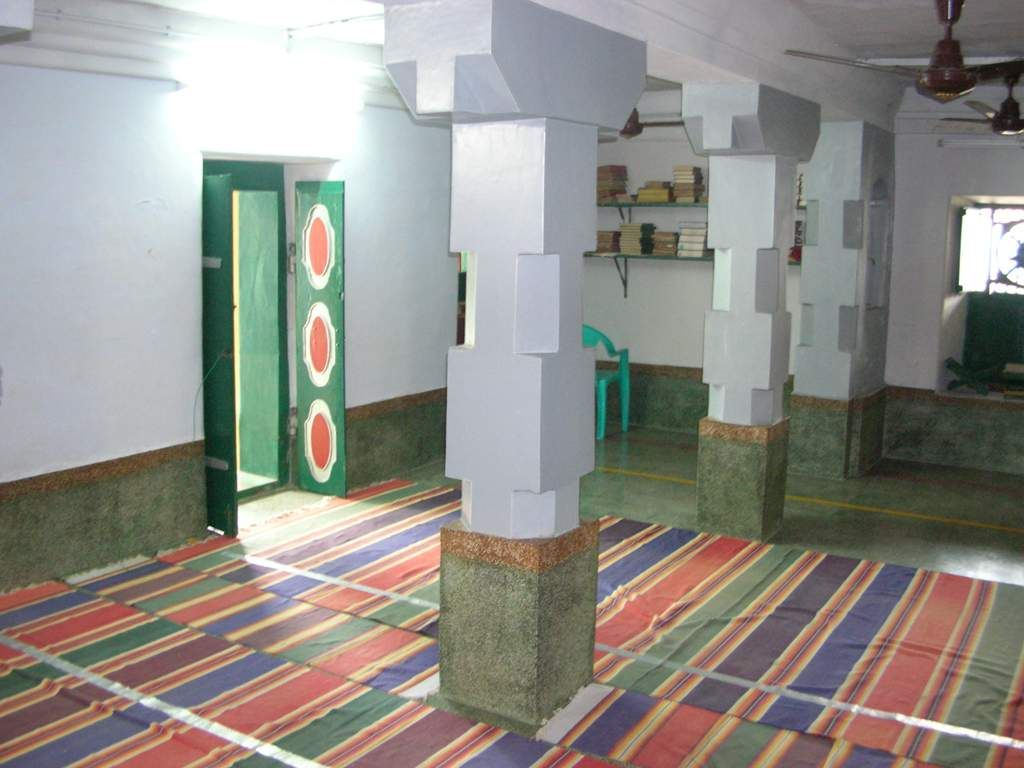
Interior of Palaiya Jumma Palli or The Old Jumma Masjid of Kilakarai, the oldest masjid of India

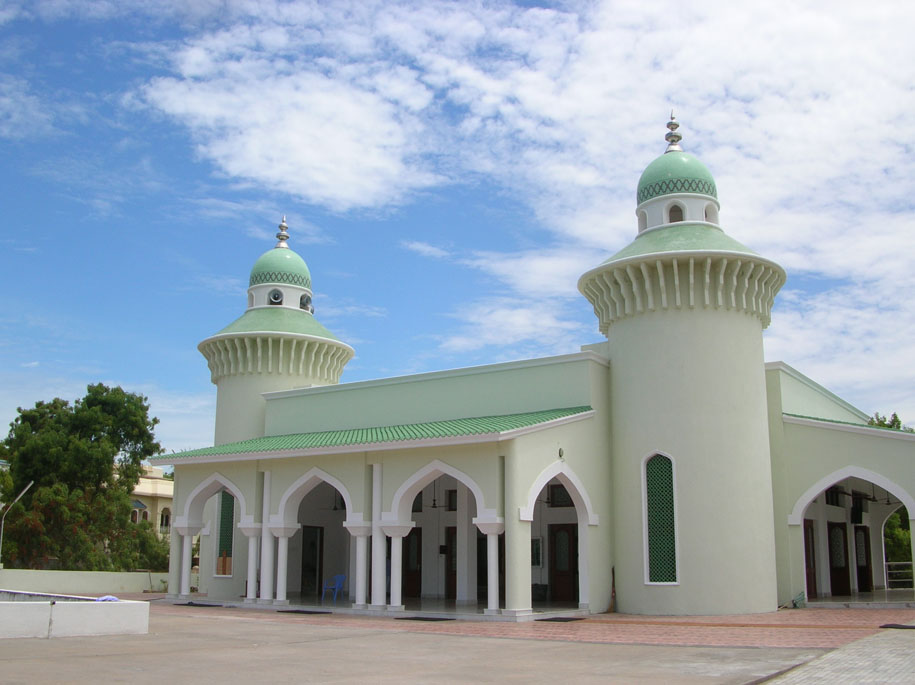
Amir ul Muminin Abu Baker Siddiq Palli (masjid)

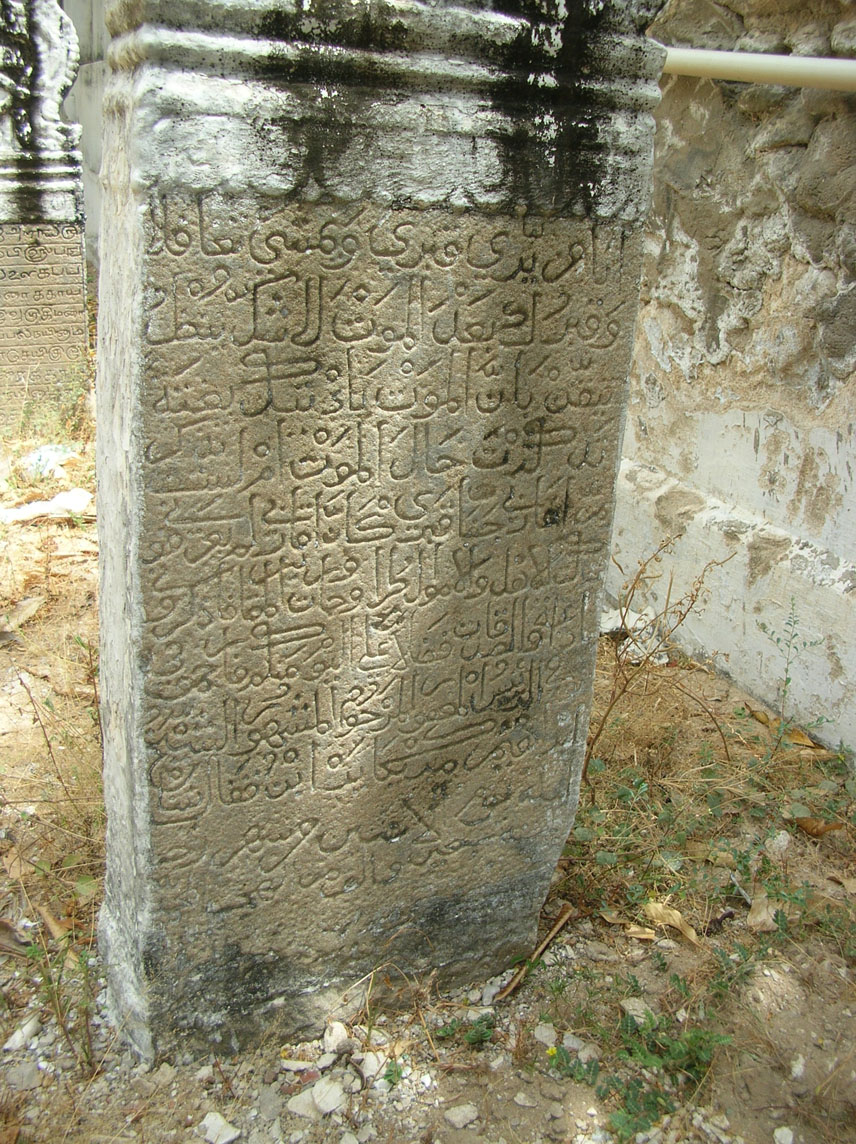
Tombstone with Arabic & Tamil (Arwi) inscription (at The Old Jumma Masjid of Kilakarai)

Kulangarai Appa Palli (masjid), East Street, Kilakkarai

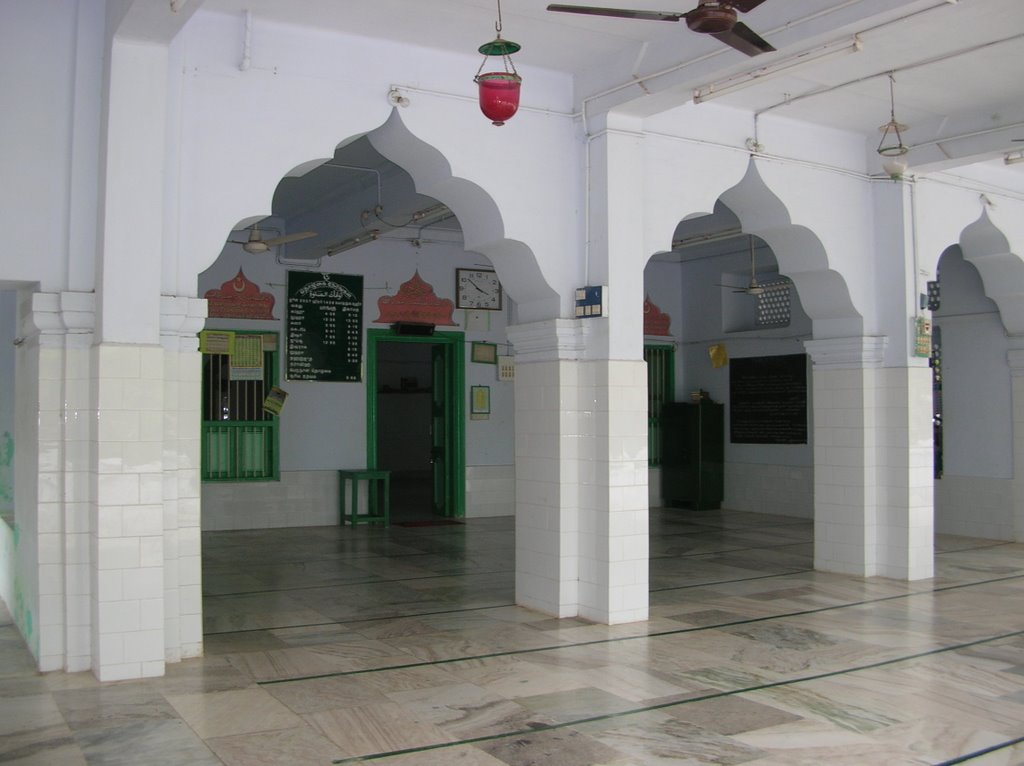
Interior of Kulangarai Appa Palli (masjid), East Street, Kilakarai

Typical street
