= Waqaruddin Qadri =

Islamic scholar

Mufti-e-Azam Pakistan Muhammad Waqaruddin Barelvi

Grand Mufti of Pakistan

Personal life
- Born: 1 January 1915 Pilibhit, Uttar Pradesh
- Died: 19 September 1993 (aged 78)
- Resting place: Darul Uloom Amjadia, Babul Madina, Karachi, Pakistan
- Parent: Hameeduddin (father)
- Citizenship: British IndianPakistani
- Era: Modern era
- Region: South Asia
- Main interests: Islamic theology; Hadith; Tafsir; Fiqh; jurisprudence; Urdu poetry, Tasawwuf
- Notable work: Waqar Ul Fatawa

Religious life
- Religion: Islam
- Denomination: Sunni
- Jurisprudence: Hanafi
- Tariqa: Qadri
- Creed: Maturidi
- Movement: Barelvi

Muslim leader
- Influenced by: Prophet Muhammed; Abu Bakr; Umar ibn al-Khattab; Uthman Ibn Affan; Ali ibn Abi Talib; Abu Dharr al-Ghifari; Abu Hanifa; Abdul Qadir Jilani; Moinuddin Chishti; Abu Mansur al-Maturidi; Ibn Arabi; Nizamuddin Auliya; Jalaluddin Suyuti; Imam Ahmed Raza Khan; Amjad Ali Aazmi; Hamid Raza Khan; Mustafa Raza Khan
- Influenced: Jamia Ahmadiyya Sunnia Kamil Madrasa; Ilyas Qadri

Muhammad Waqaruddin Qadri (1 January 1915 – 9 September 1993) also known as Waqar-e-Millat was an Islamic scholar associated with the Sunni Barelvi movement of south Asia. His fatawa (rulings) are compiled in three volume of the book titled Waqar ul Fatawa. He taught and administered in Islamic institutes in India, Bangladesh and later in Pakistan. He was conferred title of Grand Mufti of Pakistan during Muhammad Zia-ul-Haq regime.

== Birth and family ==
He was born on 1 January 1915 (14 Safar 1333 AH) to a family of scholars. They were middle class-landlords of the Arain tribe in the village Khamaria of Pilibhit, District of Uttar Pradesh, India. His father Hameeduddin had memorized the Quran. His mother Imtiazun Nisa was the daughter of Haji Nisar Ahmad of village Pandri, District Pilibhit.

== Education and career ==
He received his primary education and training in his ancestral village Khamaria, then in Madarsa-e-Astana-e-Sheria, Pilibhit and later in Manzar-e-Islam, at dargah Ala Hazrat, Bareilly. Thereafter, he went to Dadon, village of Aligarh to complete Daura-e-Hadith with Amjad Ali Aazmi.

In 1937, he was awarded degree for the completion of hadith by Hakim Amjad Ali. In 1945, he got married with Mohatarma Jameela Begum Daughter of Anwarul Haaq of village Karghaina, District Pilibhit. On appointing as Vice-President for Faculty affairs, Mufti Azame-Hind Mustafa Rida Khan gave him a certificate of appreciation.

== Academic contribution ==
He was appointed as teacher in Madarsa Manzar-e-Islam and later promoted as an in charge and manager for teaching at Manzar -e-Islam. He was among the panel of debaters who continuously debate with scholars of another school of thought. The debate with an Ahle Hadith scholar in village Tanda, District Bareilly is famous of his life time where he was awarded by Mufti Azame-Hind Mustafa Raza Khan.

He participated in the activities of All India Sunni Conference. He taught and prepared scholars here till 1954 and moved to Jamia Ahmadiyya Sunnia Kamil Madrasa in Chittagong, Bengal (now Bangladesh). Up to 1971, the residents of East Pakistan benefited by the services of Maulana Waqaruddin. Due to chaos and civil war in East Pakistan, he decided to move towards West Pakistan in 1971. After facing the difficult time, he was able to board the ship to Karachi along with his family members and close associate on 23 March 1971.

== Life in Pakistan ==
He joined Darul ulum Amjadiya in 1971 as the head of teaching and learning. He was also responsible for the center of jurisprudence. In this branch of Islamic studies, his contributions were acknowledged by scholars of his time.

== Spiritual permissions and successor-ship ==
He received the oath of allegiance (the Bay’at) to Hamid Raza Khan Qadri. He was awarded successor-ship (Khilafat) i.e the spiritual vice regency by Mustafa Raza Khan Qadri. One of his students was Ilyas Qadri, leader of Islamic missionary movement Dawat-e-Islami.

== Fatwa ==
He ruled that it is not permissible to shave the beard.

== Books ==
- Waqar Ul Fatawa
- Zakat Ki Ahmiat
- Masail e Aetikaf

== Teachers ==
Qadri’s teachers included:

- Allama Muhammad Raza Khan - brother of Imam Ahmed Raza Khan
- Amjad Ali Aazmi- The Grand Mufti of India
- Hamid Raza Khan - known as Hujjatul Islam
- Mufti-e-Azam Hind Allama Mustafa Raza Khan
- Allama Hasnain Raza Khan - Nephew of Imam Ahmed Raza Khan
- Muhaddis-e-Azam Pakistan Maulana Sardar Ahmed
- Abdul Haqq
- Habibur Rehman

== Recognition ==
He was bestowed with the title Grand Mufti of Pakistan. The Government of Pakistan nominated him as the member of Markazi Ruatay Hilal Committee during the tenure of General Muhammad Zia-ul-Haq. He coined the definition of the term "Muslim" in Pakistani constitution.

== Death ==
He died on 19 September 1993 (20 Rabi' al-awwal 1413 AH). He was buried at Darul Uloom Amjadia, Karachi, Pakistan.
