= Al Hidayah (organisation) =

Al-Hidayah
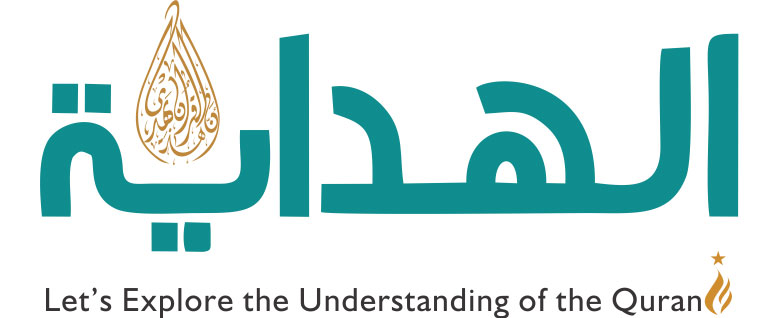
- Be Informed, Be Inspired, Be Spiritual.

Publication details
- Publisher: Minhaj-ul-Quran UK
- History: Since 2005
- Frequency: Annual event
- Website: www.al-hidayah.co.uk

Al-Hidayah (meaning "The Guidance") Al-Hidayah, is a series of annual summer camps organised by Minhaj-ul-Quran International Minhaj-ul-Quran UK. Initially focused on spiritual development and Islamic scholarship, Al-Hidayah later expanded to actively counter extremist ideologies, promoting peaceful integration and social engagement within Western societies, and developing future leadership among British young Muslims. The camps feature lectures by prominent scholars, including Shaykh-ul-Islam Muhammad Tahir-ul-Qadri, alongside workshops designed to equip young Muslims with practical skills. While the first such youth camp was organised in Glasgow in 2004, the camp was officially inaugurated as Al-Hidayah from 2005 onwards.

Al-Hidayah has mainly been held as an annual three-day residential retreat at various locations in the United Kingdom. Exceptions to this were Al-Hidayah 2017, which was held in both in the UK and Norway, Al-Hidayah 2018, which was held at Fletcher Hotel Doorwerth-Arnhem in Arnhem, and Al-Hidayah 2024, which was held in Australia. Al-Hidayah 2025 commenced with a profound keynote lecture delivered by His Eminence Shaykh-ul-Islam Muhammad Tahir-ul-Qadri on the theme: “The Pre-Eminence and Authenticity of the Sunnah and Hadith.”

Held on 2nd August at the University of Warwick, this opening session launched a three-part academic series delving into the authority of Hadith in Islamic tradition. The occasion also marked 20 years of Al-Hidayah, a spiritual and educational movement that has shaped minds and nurtured faith for over two decades.

Over 1,300 attendees filled the main auditorium, with delegates arriving from across the world, including Canada, India, Bangladesh, Norway, France, Germany, the Netherlands, Denmark, Qatar, and the United States. The atmosphere was charged with anticipation, as students of knowledge, scholars, families, and young professionals gathered to seek clarity, conviction, and spiritual rejuvenation in the company of scholars and peers.

Shaykh-ul-Islam opened with a clear assertion: Islam and Divine Guidance cannot be separated from the Prophet ﷺ. He recounted a conversation with an individual who questioned the need for Hadith, insisting that the Qur’an alone should suffice. Shaykh-ul-Islam posed a counter question: “Why do you believe the Qur’an is the word of Allah?” The answer, inevitably, was: “Because the Prophet Muhammad ﷺ said so.” That statement – a saying of the Prophet ﷺ is Hadith. Hence, the very acceptance of the Qur’an as divine rests on the authority of the Prophet ﷺ, preserved through Hadith. The argument was decisive: you cannot affirm the Qur’an without affirming the Sunnah.

Throughout his address, Shaykh-ul-Islam walked the audience through a constellation of Qur’anic verses demonstrating how Allah consistently affirms the authority of His Messenger ﷺ, often using singular grammar when referencing both Himself and the Prophet ﷺ, indicating their unity in message. For example: • “O humankind! Indeed, conclusive evidence (i.e. the Prophet Muhammad ﷺ) has come to you from your Lord, and We have sent down to you a clear light (i.e. the Qur’an).” (An-Nisa 4:174) • “There has indeed come to you a light from Allah (i.e. the Prophet ﷺ) and a manifest Book (i.e. the Qur’an).” (Al-Ma’ida 5:15) • “We have revealed the Reminder (i.e. the Qur’an) so that you may clearly explain to the people what has been sent down to them.” (Al-Nahl 16:44)

These verses highlight the inseparability of revelation and explanation. The Qur’an provides the command; the Sunnah provides the method. The Qur’an tells us to pray, fast, and perform Hajj – but without the Sunnah, we would not know how. In Surah Al-Qiyāma (75:16–19), Allah says that not only will He ensure the Qur’an is preserved and recited correctly, but its clear explanation is also upon Him – a divine responsibility fulfilled through the Prophet ﷺ.

Shaykh-ul-Islam also drew attention to verses such as: • “Whoever obeys the Messenger has indeed obeyed Allah.” (An-Nisa 4:80) • “Do not advance before Allah and His Messenger…” (Al-Hujurat 49:1) • “Respond to Allah and the Messenger when he calls you to that which gives you life.” (Al-Anfal 8:24)

These, among many others, reaffirm the Prophet’s ﷺ authority as divinely sanctioned, with no distinction made between accepting Allah and accepting His Messenger. Rejection of either is rejection of both.

The lecture concluded with an impassioned warning – especially to the youth in the audience about a growing threat in the digital age: the influence of ill-educated, unqualified voices on social media who, despite having no grounding in Islamic sciences, attract large followings through charismatic speech, slick presentation, and controversy. Shaykh-ul-Islam urged the attendees:

“Do not fall for polished language or impressive oratory. Do not mistake eloquence for truth. What sounds attractive is not always correct. What is popular online is not always authentic.”

He reminded us that Islamic knowledge requires depth, discipline, and a chain of transmission, not social media likes or trending reels. Just as medicine must be learned from certified doctors, Islam must be learned from those who have studied its sources, methodology, and traditions under qualified teachers. True scholars don’t simply speak well – they know well.

The message was clear: Invest time in learning your faith properly. Rely on sound teachings rooted in the Qur’an and Sunnah, as preserved by centuries of scholarship. Equip yourself with knowledge so you are not misled by those who speak without insight. Be wary of voices that disconnect the Qur’an from the Prophet ﷺ. Islam is a religion of balance, knowledge, and authentic tradition – not sensationalism or opinion.

As Shaykh-ul-Islam stated powerfully: “There is no Islam without the Prophet ﷺ. The Qur’an and Sunnah are not two paths; they are one light, one message, and one divine source.”

Accompanying His Eminence Shaykh-ul-Islam were Hassan Mohiuddin Qadri (Chairman Supreme Council, MQI), Shaykh Hammad Mustafa al-Madani al-Qadri, Shaykh Ahmad Mustafa al-Arabi al-Qadri, Faisal Iqbal Khan, Hamza Ansari, Ghazala Qadri (President of Minhaj-ul-Quran Women League International), Baji Khadija Qurat-ul-Ain Qadri, and Baji Basima Hassan Qadri, each exemplifying leadership in the pursuit of authentic, scholarly Islam.

This opening lecture laid a strong foundation for the next two in the series, which will examine Western critical methods and the Islamic epistemology of Hadith verification. Al-Hidayah 2025 continues to shine as a beacon of light; reviving faith, fortifying minds, and reconnecting us all to the noble legacy of the Prophet Muhammad ﷺ.

1. 20YearsOfAlHidayah #DrQadriAtAlHidayah #Al_Hidaya_2025

Hassan Mohiuddin Qadri(Chairman Supreme Council of Minhaj-ul-Quran International, Ghazalah Hassan Qadri (President of Minhaj Woman League)and Shaykh Hammad Mustafa Al Madani Al Qadri will also deliver Leactuers to the Participants of Al-Hidayah 2025.This Spiritual workshop will continue 02 August to 04 August 2025.

== Al-Hidayah 2005 (Pioneer Centre, Shropshire) ==
In 2005, Minhaj-ul-Quran UK began 'Al-Hidayah', a series of annual three-day residential educational and spiritual retreats, assumed at British Muslims, and inviting Islamic scholars from other countries.

Al-Hidayah 2005 was held in the Pioneer Centre, Shropshire. Over 300 young Muslims attended the three-day event.

== Al-Hidayah 2006 (Heythrop Park, Oxfordshire) ==
Al-Hidayah 2006, was held between Friday 25 August and Monday 28 August 2006 in Heythrop Park, Oxfordshire. The main speaker at the event was Shaykh-ul-Islam Muhammad Tahir-ul-Qadri. The event was also attended by Shaykh Asad Muhammad Saeed as-Sagharji.

== Al-Hidayah 2007 (Heythrop Park, Oxfordshire) ==
The third annual Al-Hidayah Residential Spiritual and Educational Retreat took place at the same venue as the 2006 event, in Heythrop Park Oxfordshire. Hundreds of participants from the United Kingdom and Europe attended.

== Al-Hidayah 2009 (University of Warwick) ==
Minhaj-ul-Quran UK organized a three-day annual "Al-Hidayah Youth Camp" at the University of Warwick in August 2009, which was attended by more than 1200 participants from across the world.

== Al-Hidayah 2010 (University of Warwick) ==
Al-Hidayah 2010 was held at The University of Warwick between 7 August and 9 August 2010. Over 1200 people from the United Kingdom and Europe attended.

== Peace for Humanity Conference 2011 (Wembley Arena) ==
‘Peace for Humanity’ Conference was held on 24 September 2011 at the Wembley Arena

== Al-Hidayah 2016 ==
The 2016 event was held at Keele University in Staffordshire.

== Al-Hidayah 2017 (Keele University, Staffordshire) ==
Al-Hidayah 2017 was held 26–28 August 2017 at Keele University in Staffordshire.
