= Islamic Curriculum on Peace and Counter-Terrorism =

Islamic curriculum by Muhammad Tahir-ul-Qadri

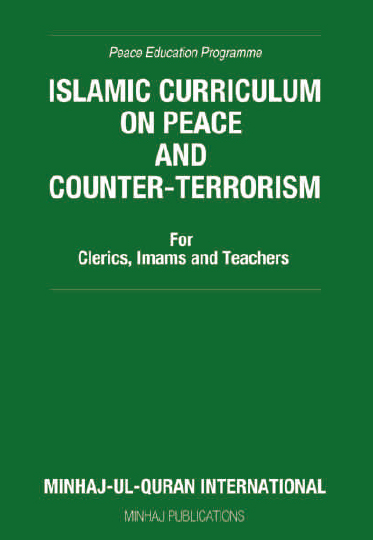
- Islamic Curriculum on Peace and Counter-Terrorism for Clerics, Imams and Teachers
- Author: Dr. Muhammad Tahir-ul-Qadri
- Language: English, Urdu
- Subject: Peace and Counter-Terrorism
- Genre: Islamic Law, Political, Social-Economic
- Publisher: Minhaj-ul-Quran Publications
- Publication date: 1 June 2015
- Publication place: United Kingdom, India
- Media type: Print (Paperback)
- ISBN: 9781908229120
- Website: www.peaceprogram.net

Islamic Curriculum on Peace and Counter Terrorism is a curriculum prepared by Shaykh-ul-Islam Dr. Muhammad Tahir-ul-Qadri on peace and counter-terrorism. The curriculum was launched on 23 June 2015 in the presence of many official guests, including Brigadier Paul Harkness, Baroness Sayeeda Warsi, Khalid Mahmood MP, along with eminent Muslim scholars from around the United Kingdom.

The Islamic Curriculum aims to develop an understanding of the concept of love and peace among the people and is also used for educating and training imams, clerics, teachers and young people on the broad array of ideological and theological principles that underpin radicalization and what the true Islamic teachings are on each subject.

== Tackling the roots of terrorism ==
The Islamic Curriculum draws heavily upon the Quranic verses and traditions of the Prophet to expose ISIS and other militant groups who have absolutely no authority or legitimacy for setting up an Islamic State. According to the curriculum, ISIS and other militant groups have nothing to do with Islam and Islam also curses those people who kill the innocent with no reason. Fatwa on Terrorism, also written by Dr. Tahir ul Qadri, has declared these militant group criminals, the enemies of humanity, the enemies of religion, the enemies of morality, the enemies of human values.

== See also ==
- Fatwa on Terrorism
