= Dar-ul-Madinah =

- دار المدینہ
- Type: Islamic school system
- Legal status: Active
- Location: Karachi, Pakistan
- Parent organization: Dawat-e-Islami
- Website: www.darulmadinah.net

Dar-ul-Madinah is an Islamic school system run by Dawat-e-Islami that aims to improve conventional academic studies in conformity with Shariah. It operates campuses in Pakistan and in several other countries.

== Overview ==
Dar-ul-Madinah is one of several educational bodies within Dawat-e-Islami's education network. In September 2025, the Associated Press of Pakistan reported that the organization's Education Council, described as the central body overseeing its educational activities, was holding an event that, for the first time, brought together Dar-ul-Madinah International Islamic School System, the Kanz-ul-Madaris Board, and Dar-ul-Madina International University.

According to Dawat-e-Islami, about 45,000 students were enrolled across its educational institutions, including Dar-ul-Madinah schools, Faizan Islamic Schools, colleges and a university. The figure covers several types of institution and not Dar-ul-Madinah alone.

== Dar-ul-Madina International University ==
Dar-ul-Madina International University is a private university in Islamabad established by Dawat-e-Islami. The Higher Education Commission (HEC) lists it among Islamabad's universities, with its campus at G-11 Markaz. A bill to establish the university was passed by the National Assembly and listed for consideration by the Senate of Pakistan in 2013. The university has announced admissions to bachelor's programmes in Arabic, Education, Islamic Studies, and Islamic Banking and Finance.

== Head office ==
=== Faizan-e-Jeelan (for boys) ===
- Project No. 7, Plot No. 171, Block 13/A, Near Gilani Masjid, Gulshan-e-Iqbal, Karachi, Pakistan

=== Faizan-e-Baghdad (for girls) ===
- B-38 Block-4, Al-Hilal Society, University Road, Karachi, Pakistan

== Sindh campuses list ==
=== Karachi ===
1. Plot No D-25 Al-Hilal Society, Opposite Askari Park
2. House No. F-38/1, Block-8, behind Agha Super Store, Clifton
3. Plot No. C-59, opposite Haider-e-Karrar Masjid, Block 2, Clifton (For Boys)
4. Plot No. JM 705, Jamshed Road No. 3, opposite Yadgar Fish
5. Plot No. C-45, Block No. 10, Ayesha Manzil, F.B Area
6. Plot No. B-1, Block 3, near Faizan-e-Attar Masjid Gulshan-e-Iqbal
7. House No. G-2, Block No. 13D/2, behind City Lawn, Gulshan-e-Iqbal
8. Plot No. L-79, Street No. 1, Sector 32-E, near Nasir Colony, Korangi No. 1 (For Boys)
9. House No. 157 & 152, Block No. 33-G, Korangi 2 ½
10. Plot No. RB-6/79 Shafie Hall, Aram Bagh Road, Gadi Khata (For Girls)
11. Plot No. G-2, Rafa e Aam Society, Malir Halt
12. Plot No. 516, Sector 15-A, Shahedan-e-Watan School, Bangla Bazar, Orangi Town
13. Plot No. B-16, Street 22, Sector 5-M, North Karachi (For Boys)
14. Plot No. L-79, Street No. 1, Sector 32-E, near Nasir Colony, Korangi No. 1
15. House No. 157 & 152, Block No. 33-G, Korangi 2 ½
16. Plot No. R-1388, Sector No. 1-A, Opposite Parking Plaza, Lines Area

=== Hyderabad ===
1. Plot No. 46/1, Near OPD Hospital, near Jaikab Road. (For Boys)
2. Yahyaa House Street, Al-Madinah Attar Cold Corner, near Shahzaib Medical Store, Pathan Colony Road.
3. Plot No. 114/A-2439 near Mehran Dairy Jail Road.
4. House # 169/3 Building near Wali Arcade Jahan Plaza Jama Masjid St: Saddar. (For Girls)
5. Plot No. 27, Block-A, Unit No. 9, near Board Office, Latifabad.
6. Plot No. C-248, Block B, Unit No. 9, Latifabad.

=== Larkana ===
1. House No. 18/1, Shahbaaz Colony, Main Shah Nawaz Bhutto Road, near Chandka Bridge. (For Boys)
2. House No. 18/1, Shahbaaz Colony, Main Shah Nawaz Bhutto Road, near Chandka Bridge.

=== Sukkhar ===
- House No. B-1066, near Rehmat Nihari House, Jinnah Chowk, Bunder Road.

=== Shahdadpur ===
- House No. 226, 227, Housing Society, near Khizra Jama Masjid, Shahdadpur

=== Tando Adam ===
- House No 543/12 near Askari Bank, Hyderabad Road, Tando Adam

== Punjab campuses list ==
1. Dar-ul-Madinah (Islamic School) Gulistan Chowk, Multan
2. Dar-ul-Madinah (Islamic School) Madinah Town, Faisalabad
3. Dar-ul-Madinah (Islamic School) Raza Abad, Faisalabad
4. Dar-ul-Madinah (Islamic School) Gulzar-e-Tayyaba, Sargodha
5. Dar-ul-Madinah (Islamic School) Defense Town, Bhalwal
6. Dar-ul-Madinah (Islamic School) Township, Lahore
7. Dar-ul-Madinah (Islamic School) Sabzazar, Lahore
8. Dar-ul-Madinah (Islamic School) Taj Bagh, Lahore
9. Dar-ul-Madinah (Islamic School) Shawala Chowk, Lahore
10. Dar-ul-Madinah (Islamic School) Satellite Town, Rawalpindi
11. Dar-ul-Madinah (Islamic School) Harley Street, Rawalpindi
12. Dar-ul-Madinah (Islamic School) Ahmed Raza, Rawalpindi
13. Dar-ul-Madinah (Islamic School) Wah Cantt, Wah Cantt
14. Dar-ul-Madinah (Islamic School) Rehman Shaheed Road, Gujrat
15. Dar-ul-Madinah (Islamic School System) Pakpura, Sialkot
16. Dar-ul-Madinah (Islamic School System) Rangers Colony, Mandi-Baha-Udin
17. Dar-ul-Madinah (Islamic School System) Dinga, [(Gujrat)]

=== Boys Secondary School ===
1. Dar-ul-Madinah (Boys Secondary School) Khadim Ali Road, Sialkot
2. Dar-ul-Madinah (Boys Secondary School) Rehman Shaheed Road, Gujrat
3. Dar-ul-Madinah (Boys Secondary School) New Karachi
4. Dar-ul-Madinah (Boys Secondary School) Korangi, Karachi
5. Dar-ul-Madinah (Boys Secondary School) Orangi Town, Karachi
6. Dar-ul-Madinah (Boys Secondary School) Saddar, Karachi
7. Dar-ul-Madinah (Boys Secondary School) Afandi Town, Hyderabad
8. Dar-ul-Madinah (Boys Secondary School) Munirabad, Multan
9. Dar-ul-Madinah (Boys Secondary School) Madinah Town, Faisalabad

=== Girls Secondary School ===
1. Dar-ul-Madinah (Girls Secondary School) Aram bagh, Karachi
2. Dar-ul-Madinah (Girls Secondary School) Korangi, Karachi
3. Dar-ul-Madinah (Girls Secondary School) Saddar, Karachi

=== Overseas ===
1. Dar-ul-Madinah (Islamic School) California, United States
2. Dar-ul-Madinah (Islamic School) in India: Agra, Akola, Ahmedabad, Delhi, Himatnagar, Modasa, Mumbai, Nagpur, Pune, Rajouri.
3. Dar-ul-Madinah (Islamic School System) Govandi, Mumbai, India
4. Dar-ul-Madinah (Islamic School System) Khadak, Mumbai, India
5. Dar-Ul Madinah, Saidpur Campus, Bangladesh
6. Dar-ul-Madinah (Islamic School System) Mombasa, Kenya

=== United Kingdom ===
1. Dar-Ul Madinah Nursery Blackburn, UK
2. London, 238 Romford Road
3. Rotherham, 1 Maltkiln Street Rotherham
4. Slough, 50 Darvills Lane Slough

== See also ==
- Dawat-e-Islami
- Jamia-tul-Madina
