= Long March (Pakistan) =

2013 public protest in Pakistan

- Date: 14–17 January 2013
- Location: Lahore to Islamabad, Pakistan
- Caused by: Corruption
- Goals: Electoral reform Dissolution of parliament
- Methods: Protest march, Sit-in
- Result: Signing of the Islamabad Long March Declaration

Parties
Government of Pakistan	Pakistan Awami Tehreek

Lead figures
Asif Ali Zardari; Raja Pervaiz Ashraf	Muhammad Tahir-ul-Qadri

Number
	~50,000

The Long March (Urdu: لانگ مارچ) was a public protest against alleged governmental corruption in Pakistan. The march moved from Lahore to Islamabad between 14 and 17 January 2013 and was organised by the Pakistani Sufi scholar Muhammad Tahir-ul-Qadri. On 17 January, the government came for negotiations and struck and agreement which was termed the Islamabad Long March Declaration, that ended the protest.

== Background ==
A series of corruption scandals had plagued Pakistan in the years preceding 2013, including a case against President Asif Zardari and former Prime Minister Yousaf Raza Gillani, who was found to be in contempt of court. The leader of the long march stayed in a bulletproof container. As the march culminated, incumbent Prime Minister Raja Pervaiz Ashraf was also found guilty of corruption in his previous cabinet post, as Minister for Water and Power. A general election is due to be held in the spring of 2013.

Shortly after returning from self-imposed exile in Canada (where he acquired Canadian citizenship), Qadri gave a speech on 23 December 2012, in which he denounced the rampant corruption at all levels of government. The speech galvanised demonstrators who were already frustrated with the president's inability to reduce militancy and improve the economy of Pakistan.

== Goals ==
The initial goal of the march was to request electoral reforms such as disallowing corrupt incumbents from standing for election and to bring forward the date for the general election due in 2013. Qadri also called for a pre-election interim government to be appointed with input from the country's judiciary and military. The demand for an interim government was met with skepticism because the military's involvement in civilian affairs would set back the democracy that had often been abrogated in the history of Pakistan; the military denied this charge. Upon reaching Islamabad the goal of the march evolved to call for the dissolution of the Parliament of Pakistan by 15 January and making President Asif Ali Zardari "an ex-president" by staging a sit-in in front of parliament (a deadline that was overlooked). Qadri also called for the dissolution of the provincial assemblies and the disbanding of the Election Commission of Pakistan (ECP).

== Protest march ==
Due to Qadri's 2010 Fatwa on Terrorism, there had been concerns from the government that a large rally led by him could be targeted by militants. As such, schools and many businesses on the march route closed and more than 10,000 police and paramilitary troops were deployed throughout Islamabad. Prior to the march, the Muttahida Qaumi Movement withdrew because of security concerns. Qadri had called for a march of over a million people, but the media reported that the actual number of participants was more than 50,000.

A caravan of protestors left Lahore in hundreds of buses, vans, motorcycles and cars. Despite government blockades using cordons of freight containers and barbed wire, the convoy was allowed to enter Islamabad, where Qadri held a rally on Jinnah Avenue, about two miles from the parliament. Demonstrators heard Qadri say: "Tomorrow, the injustices will end, and these corrupt people no longer will run the government! ... [To Zardari] Don't test the patience of these people." After previously deciding to stop the protesters from staging a sit-in outside parliament, the government allowed them to go from the rally to stage the sit-in about 500 yards from the parliament. On the morning of 15 January 2013, the police tried to disperse the protesters and arrest Qadri. Live television coverage showed forces firing in the air – a serious escalation in attempts to control crowds – while supporters of Qadri hurled stones at them. Qadri's spokesman told Reuters the crowds had prevented government forces from arresting Qadri. He said six supporters were wounded.

== Reactions ==
At the end of the march, Tehreek-e-Insaaf Chairman Imran Khan said that the current government could not ensure a free and fair election and should resign. He also demanded an immediate announcement of the general election's date, the formation of a non-partisan interim government, that the election be conducted on a predetermined schedule by an independent election commission, some immediate action on the Supreme Court's ruling for the dismissal of Prime Minister Ashraf regarding the Rental Power Projects case, and the immediate arrest of the perpetrators of the January 2013 Pakistan bombings in Quetta. He further told his party workers to be patient and wait for his call after a party meeting on 16 January in order to bring change through the ballot box. Khan also warned the government of another Long March if the Supreme Court's orders were not implemented.

Awami Muslim League Chairman Shaikh Rasheed Ahmad commended the participants and said that the Long March was not a flop and, as a result, Qadri would have a mandate in discussions. He added that the demonstrators did not care about their hunger nor severe weather but would stay in Islamabad until their demands were met and that, as such, the government was in a dangerous situation.

Government of Punjab Minister for Law Rana Sanaullah said that people had rejected Qadri's "foreign agenda" because they had not participated on the scale envisioned (millions of demonstrators) and that, as a consequence of this flop, Qadri was extremely despondent. As such, he suggested that Qadri should now display wisdom and accept the people's will. He further noted the Punjab government's expenditure of Rs 40 crores and the deployment of over 50,000 police to provide security for the event.

The Chairman of the All Pakistan Traders Association, Sheikh Muhammad Saddique, said that a majority of the governing and opposition leaders blamed Qadri for finding funding from foreign countries and had criticised his dual nationality, while accusing him of not having a specific agenda. Despite strong opposition, Saddique also said the Long March was not a flop. The Chairman of the All Pakistan Civil Society, Azhar Mir, said that a gathering of such a magnitude could not be ignored and could be dangerous for the government. He suggested that the government had to rectify the situation since the "'Long March' show has not flopped."

Salman Akram Raja, a senior Supreme Court lawyer, said that the constitution of Pakistan did not have a provision to accept Qadri's demands and that "the revolution of Qadri is totally against the constitution, which I strongly condemn." Jinnah Institute's Raza Rumi said: "This represents a big threat to Pakistan's parliamentary process and its hard-fought democratic freedoms."

=== Media ===
Regarding the march, the Daily Times wrote that it "took away [the] capital's charm" because, while such rallies are a democratic right, the protesters left behind a trail of garbage and made the local inhabitants' life abnormal. The Frontier Post suggested that a resolution to the conflict could ease pressure on the Pakistan People's Party (PPP) following criticism of its inability to deal with the Tehrik-i-Taliban Pakistan's insurgency and the weak economy.

== Declaration ==
The Islamabad Long March Declaration was signed by Prime Minister Raja Parvez Ashraf following the appointment of a 10-member committee to negotiate with Qadri. Qadri accepted the agreement after he issued a second ultimatum from his bullet-proof mobile quarters. The government's decision to proceed with the negotiation arose from fear that inclement weather would lead to deaths among those picketing the parliament. The government's negotiation committee was led by former Prime Minister Chaudhry Shujaat Hussain and included members from all parties in the governing coalition, including PPP leader Makhdoom Amin Fahim and Law Minister Farooq H. Naek.

On the night of 17 January, Qadri told the protesters gathered in Islamabad that he would be allowed to have a say in the appointment of an interim prime minister to oversee the election. The agreement also led to permitting an extra month for the electoral process so as to allow for the scrutinising of the electoral nomination in order to keep out corrupt and criminal figures. The agreement also proposed two potential prime ministerial candidates in "complete consensus" with the opposition. The composition of the ECP would be decided later in a consensual manner as its members could only be formally impeached and all parties had given their accession to the commission. Specifically, the National Assembly would be dissolved before 16 March with the election being held within 90 days following one month of scrutiny of the nominees, under Articles 62 and 63 of the Constitution of Pakistan. The treasury benches would coordinate with the Pakistan Awami Tehreek to nominate one of the two prime ministerial nominees. Electoral reforms would entail a focus on: Articles 62, 63 and 218 (3) of the constitution; Sections 77 to 82 of the Representation of Peoples' Act 1976 (and other provisions on the conduct of a free, fair, just and honest election and against corrupt practices); and the Supreme Court Judgment of 8 June 2012 on constitutional petition 87 of 2011 (challenging election campaign expenses and its regulation) which should be implemented in "true letter and spirit." Further, all charges registered by the counter parties against each other would be withdrawn immediately with no recourse to victimisation and vendetta. Qadri then congratulated the demonstrators, notably the female party workers, the country, and the government for a successful end to the protests and said that it was a model for the world to see. He stated, "It is a day of victory for the marchers and the nation alike. [I thank] Almighty Allah who bestowed His blessings [on the protesters]." He then read the text of the declaration's five points to the gathered audience.

=== Reactions to the declaration ===
In reaction to the declaration, Pakistan Muslim League (Q) (PML-Q) leader and committee chairman Chaudhry Shujaat Hussain said that he was thankful to Allah for helping to amicably resolve all the issues. PPP leader Makhdoom Amin Fahim, Muttahida Qaumi Movement (MQM) leader Farooq Sattar, Awami National Party (ANP) leader Afrasiab Khattak, Information Minister Qamar Zaman Kaira and others congratulated the country over the resolution. Kaira said: "Nobody has lost anything in dialogue; rather it is [a] victory of the democracy; it is [a] victory of the entire nation; it is [a] victory of rule of law" and added that Qadri deserved special commendation for conducting a peaceful rally. Qadri then thanked the media for raising awareness of the situation, in particular his party's rally.

The following day, Punjab Chief Minister Shahbaz Sharif said that the march had reached its logical end by turning into an "Allied March." He also told lawmakers in Lahore that the goals of the protest were not met and that innocent children, women and old people were made to wait in the cold and rain as the "desires of anti-democratic forces were foiled and an attempt to derail democracy, in the name of so-called revolution near the general elections, was defeated."

Jamaat-e-Islami's Ameer Syed Munawar Hasan said that the march ended "in a frightful manner" with an agreement that met none of the demands. He argued that although Qadri exalted the Supreme Court's arrest order for the prime minister, Qadri then "accepted the script signed by the same premier". He added that Qadri was seen embracing and commending the government's representatives who he had previously called "former ministers," while the information minister who had ridiculed Qadri then embraced him. He also accused Qadri of playing with the sentiments of thousands of people and asserted that the demand for reforming the electoral commission was unconstitutional and "highly non-serious." Munawar added that it was unfortunate that those who had attended such fairs did not listen to their so-called well wishers.

The Federal Investigation Agency (FIA) also closed inquiries into Qadri and his party's funding for organising the march.

== See also ==
- List of protests in the 21st century
