= Syed Muhammad Faisal Sami =

British-Pakistani humanitarian

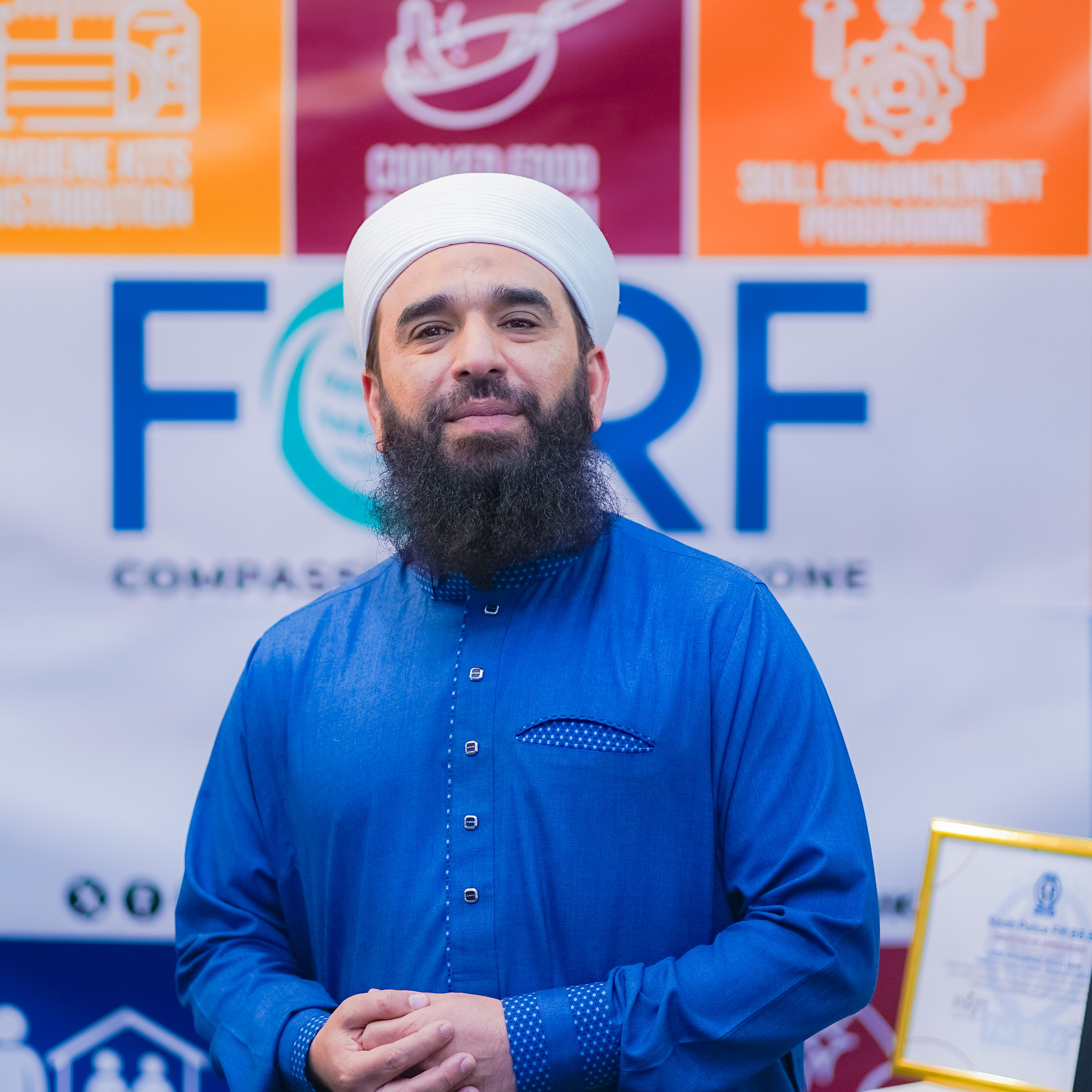

Personal life
- Born: 1 February 1977 (age 49) Karachi, Pakistan
- Home town: Birmingham
- Education: Dars-i-Nizami, BBA Business, MBA Business
- Known for: Head of FGRF UK
- Other name: Syed Fuzail Raza Attari
- Occupation: Head of Faizan Global Relief Foundation UK

Religious life
- Religion: Islam
- Denomination: Sunni
- Institute: Dawat-e-Islami
- Jurisprudence: Hanafi
- Tariqa: Qadiri
- Creed: Maturidi
- Movement: Barelvi

Muslim leader
- Based in: Birmingham
- Awards: British Citizen Award
- Website: https://www.syedfaisalsami.com

Syed Muhammad Faisal Sami also known as Syed Fuzail Raza Attari (born 1 February 1977) is a British-Pakistani humanitarian known for his contributions to social welfare and disaster relief. He has served as the Head of Dawat-e-Islami for Wales and Midlands, and currently Heads Faizan Global Relief Foundation, United Kingdom.

== Early life and education ==
Syed Muhammad Faisal Sami was born in Karachi, Pakistan.

== Career ==
Syed Muhammad Faisal Sami is the head of Faizan Global Relief Foundation, United Kingdom.

== Humanitarian Contributions ==
COVID-19

During the COVID-19 pandemic, Syed Muhammad Faisal Sami launched food banks and well-being call centers while facilitating an emergency morgue in Birmingham. Morocco 2023 Earthquake

More than 2,900 people were killed after a huge earthquake hit Morocco, further injuring 5,900 people and affecting over 300,000 people in Marrakesh and its outskirts. Syed Muhammad Faisal Sami along with Birmingham-based aid workers from Faizan Global Relief Foundation made their way to Morocco to help with aid and support for the victims.

Whilst there, Syed Muhammad Faisal Sami and his team distributed tents, food, blankets and medical aid to devastated villagers. Gaza, Palestine

Syed Muhammad Faisal Sami along with volunteers from Faizan Global Relief Foundation sent container-loads of aid to Gaza, from Turkey, which has helped and fed approximately 41,000 people.

An additional shipment of aid, coordinated by Syed Muhammad Faisal Sami, was sent from Jordan, containing 24,000 kilograms of flour, 650 ration boxes and vital supplies.

Tree-Plantation

Syed Muhammad Faisal Sami has been involved in tree-planting campaigns to combat climate change and improve local environments, resulting in the planting of thousands of trees with volunteers of Faizan-e-Madina Mosque. Social Issues

Syed Muhammad Faisal Sami has spent years campaigning and raising awareness about knife crime, county lines, drugs, nitrous oxide, fly-tipping, speeding and other social issues.

== Awards and recognition ==
- Outstanding Citizen Award 2023
- British Citizen Award 2024
- UK Volunteer of Year Award 2024
- High Sheriff of West Midlands Award 2024
- Community Champion of the Year Award 2024
- The Frontline Leader Award 2024
- Influencer Magazine 2025 Humanitarian Of The Year
- Achievement in Community Service at Asian Achievers Awards

Sami's humanitarian efforts have been recognised by international media, including coverage by the BBC and Pakistani news outlets. His work on earthquake relief in Morocco as well as welfare initiatives in Gaza, has been featured.

Syed Muhammad Faisal Sami was named one of the top ten Muslim news-makers of 2024 following his receipt of the British Citizen Award for his contributions to community service and humanitarian efforts.
