= Faizan Global Relief Foundation =

Pakistani welfare organization

- Abbreviation: FGRF
- Type: Welfare organization
- Parent organization: Dawat-e-Islami
- Website: www.fgrf.org

The Faizan Global Relief Foundation (FGRF) is a welfare organization that describes itself as working independently to assist people affected by disasters. It is the welfare wing of Dawat-e-Islami and has carried out relief work in Pakistan and several other countries.

== History ==
FGRF runs four major projects: Madani Home, Green Pakistan, the Faizan Rehabilitation Program, and the Disaster Management Department. Madani Home was established in 2022 to support orphans and children with physical or mental disabilities. The Green Pakistan Initiative, started in 2021, is an ongoing project of plantation drives in major cities of Pakistan. The Faizan Rehabilitation Program, established in January 2021, assisted people affected by flooding in rural areas of Sindh and Balochistan. The Disaster Management Department supplies food and medical aid in flood-affected areas.

== Collaborations ==
FGRF has worked with the Karachi Metropolitan Corporation (KMC), the municipal authority in Karachi, on environmental restoration projects in the city. According to the organization, almost two million trees have been planted in Pakistan with the help of volunteers. In September 2022 an FGRF delegation met the Chief Minister of Punjab, and the Punjab government expressed interest in working with FGRF and other welfare organizations in response to food shortages in some rural parts of the province.

In early 2023, a Madani healthcare center was established and inaugurated by the Governor of Sindh, Kamran Tessori.

== Disaster relief ==
=== Floods in Pakistan ===
During the 2022 Pakistan floods, FGRF's executive director, Muhammad Shahrukh Attari, told the Associated Press of Pakistan that the organization was providing cooked meals twice a day to 100,000 people in flood-affected areas, including parts of Sindh. FGRF later moved into a rehabilitation phase and announced a plan to construct 10,000 single-storey houses for flood victims across the country. In December 2023, an FGRF spokesperson said the organization had built around 5,000 houses for flood victims across Pakistan, and FGRF handed over keys to houses built for flood-affected residents of Kalam. At a ceremony in Dera Ismail Khan, the Governor of Khyber Pakhtunkhwa praised FGRF's financial assistance to 61 families affected by the 2022 floods.

During the 2025 floods in Pakistan, the National Disaster Management Authority (NDMA) listed FGRF among the welfare organizations supplying relief goods under its supervision. FGRF's UK branch in Birmingham also raised funds and organised aid shipments to Pakistan.

=== Earthquake in Turkey and Syria ===
In the first week of February 2023, an earthquake struck Turkey and Syria, causing thousands of casualties. FGRF reported having volunteers in the affected area and appealed for public donations. Haji Abdul Habib Attari visited earthquake-affected areas and distributed food to victims.

=== Earthquake in Morocco ===
After the September 2023 earthquake in Morocco, which killed more than 2,000 people and injured over 1,400, aid workers from FGRF UK, led by Syed Muhammad Faisal Sami of Birmingham, travelled to the affected area. The group had previous disaster-relief experience in Turkey and Syria. It coordinated with local teams and volunteers, helped people out of the rubble, and distributed aid.

FGRF continued its Morocco operations in 2024. A team travelled to Morocco on 9 May and reached several villages in remote areas. According to the Associated Press of Pakistan, FGRF distributed 11,000 ration packs and essential supplies, along with 2,000 gas cylinders for cooking. Over a hundred mattresses, blankets, pillows and other necessities had been sent earlier, in September and November. During the visit, the team also supplied food, drinks, toys and clothing to nearly 1,000 children at an orphanage.

=== Cyclone Freddy in Malawi ===
FGRF donated food and non-food items to survivors of Tropical Cyclone Freddy at Chilumba Camp in Chikwawa District, Malawi. FGRF's head for Africa, Muhammad Usman Madani, said the donation followed an assessment of the situation in the district.

== Humanitarian aid in Gaza ==
Since the start of the Gaza war in October 2023, FGRF has carried out relief activities for people in Gaza. In November 2023, Abdul Habib Attari, spokesperson of Dawat-e-Islami, said FGRF members inside the area had supplied food and other essentials despite the siege.

According to FGRF's UK head, Syed Fuzail Raza Attari, by April 2024 the organization had distributed one month's ration packs to 40,000 people, vegetables to 2,500 people, and cash assistance to 1,000 families, and had distributed about one hundred thousand cooked food boxes. Reported items also include tents for 200 families whose homes were damaged, hygiene kits for 1,500 people, and containers of supplies including food, 800 mattresses, 1,400 blanket kits and clothing. FGRF announced plans to donate three ambulances and said it continued to provide daily meals.

FGRF has also operated outside Gaza. In June, Dawat-e-Islami announced a free medical center in Egypt for Palestinians displaced from Gaza.

=== Meetings with Palestinian diplomats ===
In July, Abdul Habib Attari, a member of Dawat-e-Islami's central core committee and its spokesperson, met Palestine's ambassador to Pakistan. He briefed the ambassador on FGRF's daily relief work for Gaza, and the ambassador thanked Dawat-e-Islami and FGRF and presented Attari with a shield of appreciation. According to Dawat-e-Islami's own website, Attari and FGRF's Europe head, Syed Fuzail Raza, also met the head of the Palestinian Embassy in Egypt to discuss relief work.
