= Ilyas Qadri =

Pakistani Islamic social worker (born 1950)

- الیاس قادری
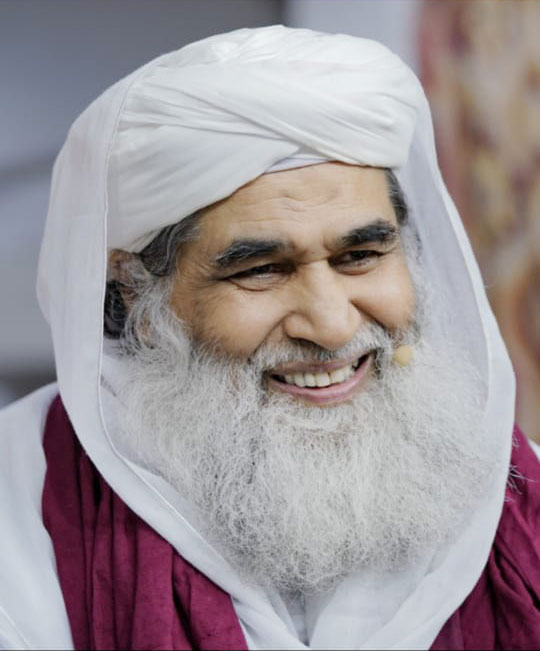
- Qadri in 2022

Personal life
- Born: Muhammad Ilyas Attar Qadri; 12 July 1950 (age 76) Karachi, Pakistan
- Notable work: Faizan-e-Sunnat
- Known for: Founder of Dawat-e-Islami
- Website: www.ilyasqadri.com; www.dawateislami.net

Religious life
- Religion: Islam
- Denomination: Sunni
- Jurisprudence: Hanafi
- Tariqa: Qadiri
- Creed: Maturidi
- Movement: Barelvi

Muslim leader
- Teacher: Waqaruddin Qadri; Ziauddin Madani
- Television: Madani Channel

YouTube information
- Channel: Maulana Ilyas Qadri
- Years active: 2013—present
- Subscribers: 2.18 million
- Views: 360 million
- Last updated: 8 March 2026

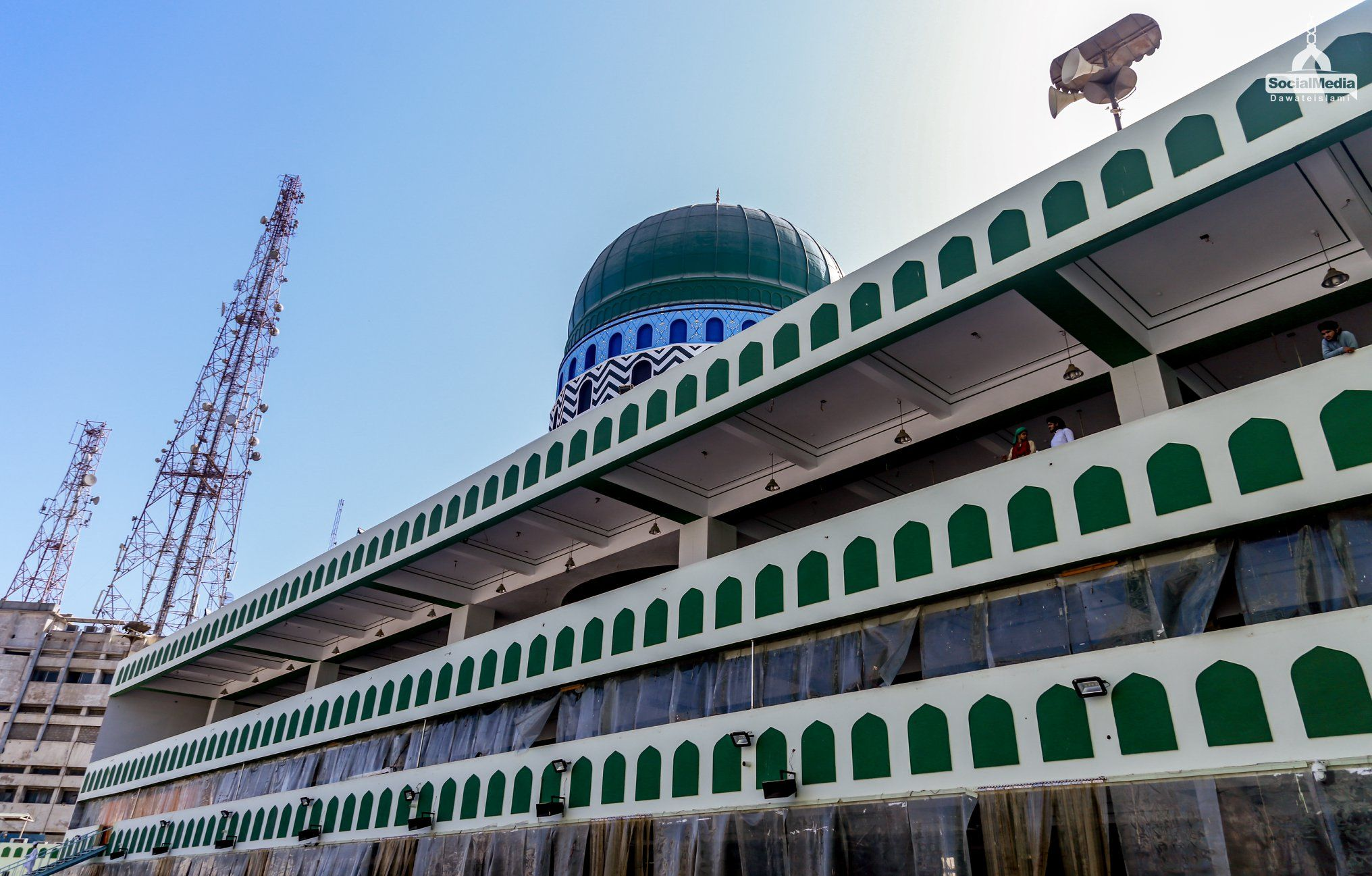
View of Faizan e Madina

Muhammad Ilyas Attar Qadri (Note: Urdu: محمد الیاس عطار قادری, romanized: Muḥammad Ilyās ʿAṭṭār Qādrī) (born 1950) is a Pakistani Islamic scholar who is the leader of Dawat-e-Islami since its foundation. He belongs to the Qadri–Razavi order of Sufism.

A Kutchi Memon, Qadri was born in Karachi and studied under Ziauddin Madani and Muhammad Waqaruddin Qadri at Darul Uloom Amjadia.

== Early life and education ==
His Kutchi Memon ancestors originated from the village of Kutyanah in Junagarh, Gujarat, India. His father held various positions at the Hanafi Memon Mosque in Pakistan for an extended period. Following the establishment of Pakistan, his parents relocated to the country, initially settling in Hyderabad, Sindh before eventually moving to Karachi.

Ilyas Qadri was born on July 12, 1950, in Karachi. His father, Abdur Rahman Qadri, was commonly referred to with the title "Haji" due to his purported passing while undertaking the hajj pilgrimage.

Qadri pursued his studies for approximately 22 years under the tutelage of the esteemed scholar Muhammad Waqaruddin Qadri at Darul Uloom Amjadia in Karachi.

== Career ==
=== Dawat-e-Islami ===
Dawat-e-Islami has contributed towards the promotion of Islamic education. It has established madrasas where children and adults learn and memorize the Quran, and Jamia-tul-Madina where the Dars-e-Nizami curriculum is taught.

Dawat-e-Islami has departments including Islamic Jurisprudence, Madani Channel, Madrasa tul Madinah, Jamia-tul-Madina, Departments of Mosque Service, Madani Inamat and Madani Qafila.

His Dawat-e-Islami is a non-political global organization of Barelvi Sunnis spread over 195+ countries. He has around 30 million disciples all over the world.

=== Sufism ===
Ilyas Qadri became a murid of Ziauddin Madani, himself a disciple of Ahmad Raza Khan. Fazlur Rahman Malik and Waqaruddin also authorized him in Sufism. Shariful Haq Amjadi authorized him in all the four major Sufi orders, Qadiriyyah, Chishtiyyah, Naqshbandiyyah, and Suhrawardiyya. Amjadi also gave him ijazah to transmit ahadith.

== Books ==
He is the author of some 30 books, including his major work Faizan-e-Sunnat in 2 volumes and more than 2000 pages. His other publications include:

- Laws of Ṣalāĥ
- Priceless Diamonds
- Cure for Anger
- I want to rectify myself
- Method of becoming Pious
- Cure for Sins
- Test of the Grave

== Criticism ==
Ilyas Qadri has faced allegations related to extremism and controversial statements. These include supporting extrajudicial killings of blasphemers. His affiliation with individuals involved in violent incidents has raised concerns. Mumtaz Qadri, associated with Dawat-e-Islami, murdered Pakistani governor Salman Taseer. Ilyas Qadri declared the murderer a ‘ghazi’. Ghouse Mohammad, connected to Dawat-e-Islami, was involved in a brutal murder in Udaipur, India. The investigation led to the detention of five individuals, including the two prime accused.
