= Minhaj University Lahore =

Private university in Lahore, Punjab, Pakistan

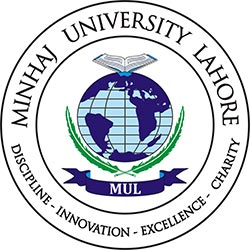
- Motto: Discipline -Innovation - Excellence - Charity
- Type: Private
- Established: 1986
- Parent institution: Minhaj-ul-Quran International
- Affiliations: Minhaj ul Quran, Higher Education Commission (Pakistan), Pakistan Engineering Council, Al Azhar University, Egypt (for Faculty of Islamic Studies and Sharia only)
- Chairman: Prof Dr. Muhammad Tahir Ul Qadri
- Chancellor: Governor of the Punjab
- Vice-Chancellor: Prof Dr Sajid Mehmood Shahzad
- Deputy Chairman BOG: Prof Dr Hussain Mohi-ud-din Qadri
- Total staff: 1200+
- Students: 18000+
- Location: Lahore, Punjab, Pakistan
- Campus: Township and Model Town
- Colours: Blue and Green
- Nickname: MUL
- Mascot: Minhajian
- Website: mul.edu.pk

The Minhaj University Lahore (MUL) is a private university located in Lahore, Punjab, Pakistan.

== Introduction ==
Minhaj University Lahore was founded in 1986 by Shaykh-ul-Islam Prof. Dr. Muhammad Tahir-ul-Qadri patron-in-chief of Minhaj-ul-Quran. The degree awarding status was granted by the Government of the Punjab government on the Punjab vide Act No. XII of 2005. Higher Education Commission of Pakistan also recognized the University as “W3” category.

== Academics ==
MUL consists of the following faculties and schools:

=== Faculty of Engineering and Technology ===
- School of Electrical Engineering (PEC Approved)
- School of Chemical Engineering

=== Faculty of Economics and Management Sciences ===
- School of Business & Management
- School of Economics
- School of Commerce and Accountancy
- International Center of Excellence

=== Faculty of Basic Sciences and Mathematics ===
- School of Chemistry
- School of Physics
- School of Mathematics
- School of Statistics
- School of Botany

=== Faculty of Computer Science and Information Technology & Software Engineering ===
- School of Computer Sciences
- School of Information Technology
- School of Artificial Intelligence
- School of Software Engineering

=== Faculty of Social Sciences and Humanities ===
- School of International Relations
- School of Political Science
- School of Media and Communication Studies
- School of Education
- School of Library and Information Sciences
- School of Criminology and Criminal Justice System
- School of Sociology
- School of Peace and Counter Terrorism
- School of Religion and Philosophy

=== Faculty of Languages ===
- School of English Language and Literature
- School of Arabic
- School of Urdu

=== Faculty of Islamic Studies ===
- School of Islamic thought and civilization
- School of Shariah and Islamic Law

=== Faculty of Allied Health Sciences ===
- Faculty of clinical nutrition
- Food science and technology

=== Faculty of Law ===
- School of Law

=== Faculty of Applied Sciences ===
- School of Food Science and Technology
- School of Bio Chemistry

== Research Centres ==
- Centre of Research and Innovation in Maritime Affairs (CRIMA)
- Center for Research and Development (CRD)

== See also ==
- List of Islamic educational institutions
- Minhaj ul Quran
- List of universities in Pakistan
