= Sunni Dawate Islami =

- Abbreviation: SDI
- Formation: 1990
- Founder: Shakir Ali Noori
- Founded at: Mumbai
- Type: Religious organisation
- Legal status: active
- Headquarters: 132 Kambekar Street, Fine Mansion, 1st Floor, Mumbai 400003, Maharashtra
- Origins: India
- Region served: Worldwide
- Ameer: Shakir Ali Noori
- Affiliations: Sunni Islam
- Website: sunnidawateislami.net

Sunni Dawate Islami is an Indian Non-governmental and socio-religious organisation which works for sunni muslims of India founded by Muhammad Shakir Ali Noori in 1990. It is headquartered at Mumbai, Maharashtra and other offices abroad. They organise International Sunni Ijtema at Azad Maidan, Mumbai for 2 days. It completed its 20th Annual Conference in 2010 and 30th Annual Conference in 2022. It takes out a great procession of Juloos-e-Muhammadi on the occasion of Eid-ul-Milad-un-Nabi every year. Sunni Dawate Islami established SDI Ummeed, a professionals wing to help students in their studies and career and also to help them emotionally to come out of depression.

== Centres ==
In 2008, SDI had a European headquarters at Noor Hall in Preston, England, and centres in some other English towns, including: Blackburn, Bolton, Leicester and Manchester. SDI also had a North American headquarters in Chicago. By 2008, SDI had founded 12 madrasas in India.

== See also ==
- Shakir Ali Noori
- Dawat-e-Islami
