= Muhammad Tahir-ul-Qadri =

Pakistani Islamic scholar and former politician (born 1951)

Shaykh al-Islam Muhammad Tahir-ul-Qadri
- محمد طاہر القادری
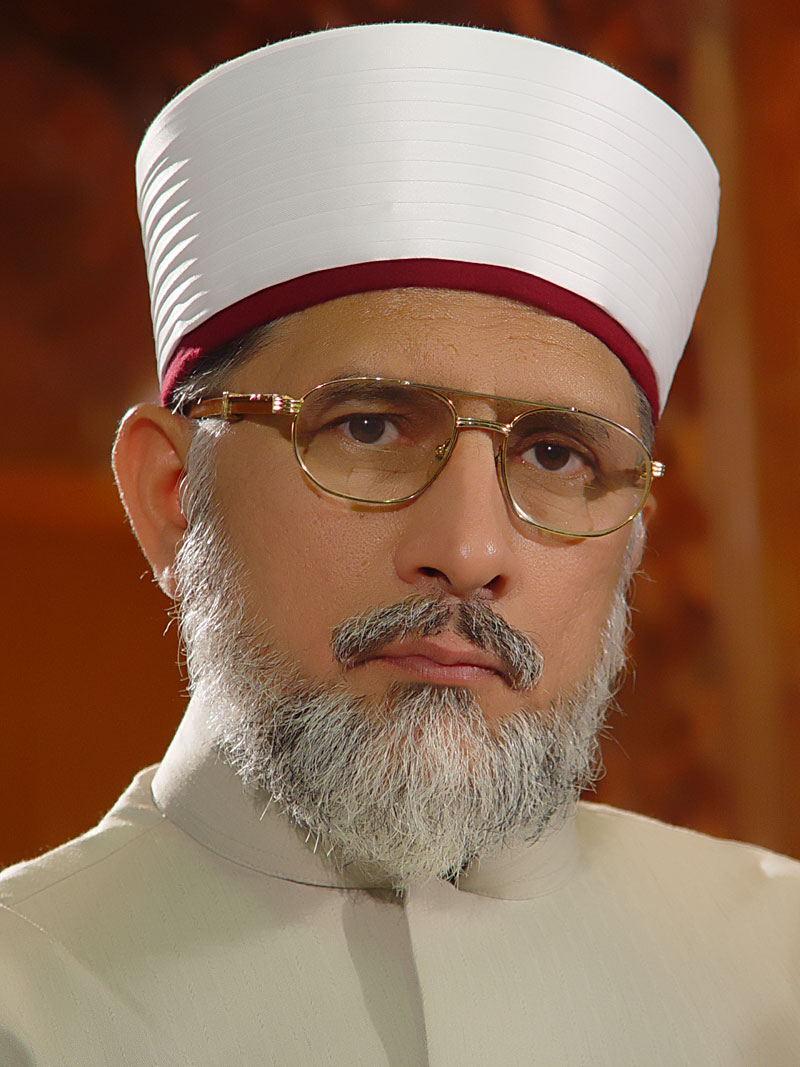
- Qadri in 2011

Personal life
- Born: 19 February 1951 (age 75) Jhang, West Punjab, Pakistan
- Citizenship: Pakistan; Canada
- Political party: Pakistan Awami Tehreek
- Main interest(s): Tafsir, Sharia, Fiqh, Hadith, Quran, Usul al-Fiqh, Sufism, History, Aqidah
- Education: University of the Punjab
- Website: minhaj.org, pat.com.pk www.minhaj.tv

Religious life
- Religion: Islam
- Denomination: Sunni
- Jurisprudence: Hanafi
- Tariqa: Qadiri

Muslim leader
- Period in office: October 1981 – Present

Academic background
- Thesis: Punishment in Islam their Classification & Philosophy (1984)
- Doctoral advisor: Bashir Ahmad Siddique

Muhammad Tahir-ul-Qadri (Note: Urdu: محمد طاہر القادری) (born 19 February 1951) is a Pakistani–Canadian Islamic scholar and former politician. He is the founder and chief patron of Minhaj-ul-Quran International (MQI) since 1980. He also founded the Pakistan Awami Tehreek (PAT) and served as its leader from 1989 to 2019.

Born in Jhang, West Punjab, Qadri studied classical Islamic sciences under numerous Islamic scholars throughout the Muslim world, gaining more than 500 ijazas and isnads in various fields of Islamic knowledge. After graduating from University of the Punjab, he served as a professor of international constitutional law at the university. Hix expertise in Islamic jurisprudence led him to being appointed as a jurist consult on sharia law for the Supreme Court and the Federal Shariat Court. Qadri laid foundation to Minhaj-ul-Quran International in 1980, Minhaj University Lahore in 1986 and Minhaj Welfare Foundation in 1989. In the same year, he also founded the Pakistan Awami Tehreek political party and successfully contested the 1990 Pakistani general election, serving as Member of the National Assembly until 2004 when he resigned in protest against President Pervez Musharraf's policies. After conflicts with "the Establishment", Qadri relocated to Canada in 2005 and began refocusing on religion.

Qadri returned to Pakistan in 2012 and led the Long March against Prime Minister Yusuf Raza Gilani in January 2013. In the aftermath of the Model Town incident in June 2014, Qadri spearheaded the Inqilab March against Gilani's successor Nawaz Sharif. In 2019, he announced his retirement from politics due to health issues and profound academic commitments. Since then, he has continued to give religious lectures in Canada.

A highly prolific writer, Qadri has authored more than 1,000 books in Urdu, Arabic and English. He has delivered over 6,000 lectures and has been featured in every edition of The 500 Most Influential Muslims since its first edition in 2009. In 2012, he was one of the reported nominations for the Nobel Peace Prize for his opposition to extremism and promotion of inter-faith dialogue.

== Early life and education ==
Muhammad Tahir-ul-Qadri was born on 19 February 1951 in Jhang, a city in Punjab, Pakistan, into a Punjabi Muslim family with a strong scholarly and spiritual heritage. His father, Dr. Farid-ud-Din Qadri, was a respected physician, Sufi poet, and religious scholar who emphasized both secular and Islamic education for his son.

=== Early Education ===
Qadri’s early education blended religious and secular instruction. He attended the Sacred Heart School, a Catholic mission school in Jhang, where he learned English and gained exposure to Christianity.

Concurrently, he began formal Islamic studies under his father at age 10, focusing on classical texts and Sufi practices. At 12, he traveled to Medina, Saudi Arabia, to enroll at Madrasa al-‘Ulum ash-Shar‘iyya, situated in the historic residence of Abu Ayyub al-Ansari, a companion of the Islamic prophet Muhammad. This institution provided rigorous training in Quranic exegesis (tafsir), Hadith, jurisprudence (fiqh), and Arabic language.

He also studied classical Islamic sciences under eminent scholars around the world, including in Makkah, Madinah, Syria, Baghdad, Lebanon, Morocco, India, and Pakistan, receiving around 500 authorities and chains of transmission in various branches of Islamic knowledge. He learned under Mawlana Ziauddin Madani (d. 1981, aged 107) and studied Hadith from Muhaddith al-Hijaz al-Sayyid ‘Alawi ibn ‘Abbas al-Maliki al-Makki (d. 1971). Additionally, al-Shaykh al-Sayyid ‘Alawi's son, the late muhaddith of al-Hijaz, al-Sayyid Muhammad 'Alawi al-Maliki (d. 2004), gave Qadri all of his father's ijazas and isnads in written form, which had been previously received verbally, as well as his own chains of transmission.

=== Higher education and academic career ===
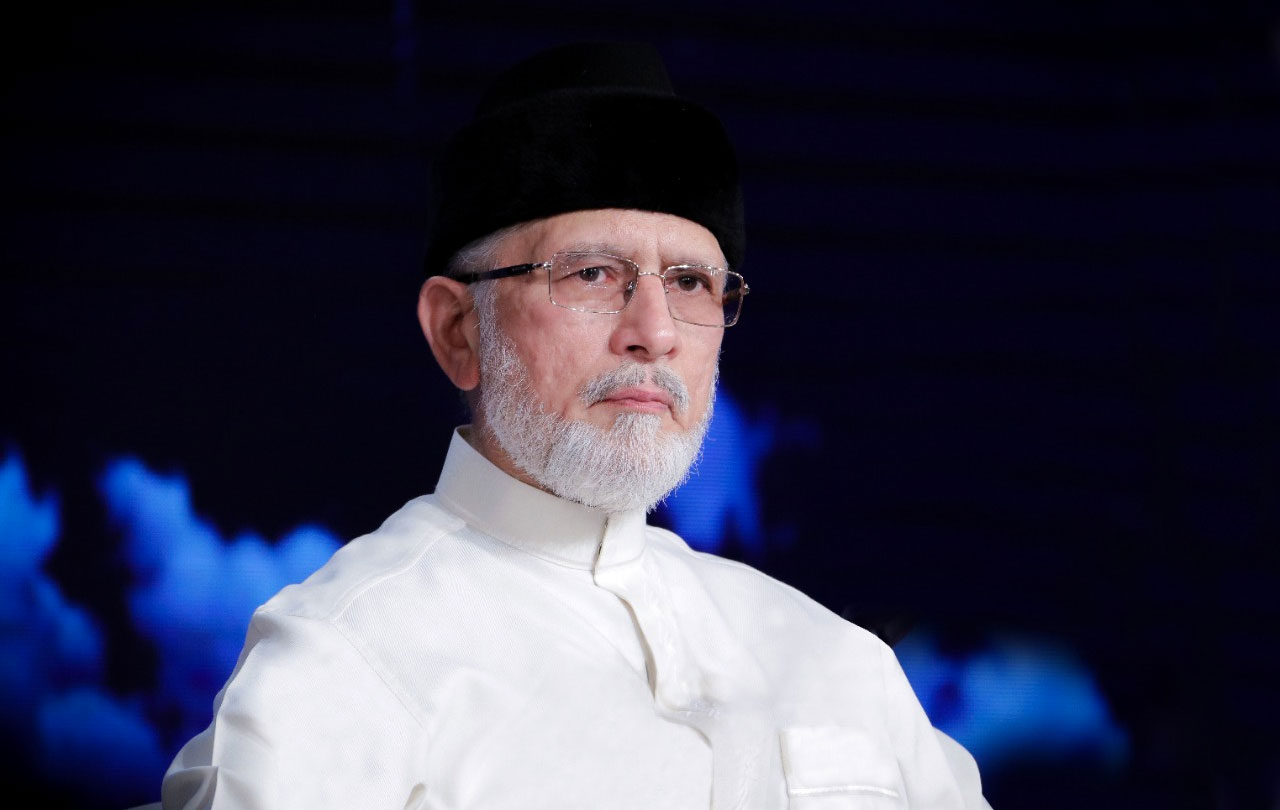
Qadri in 2019

Returning to Pakistan, Qadri pursued higher education at the University of the Punjab in Lahore. He earned a Bachelor of Laws (LLB) in 1974, followed by a Master of Arts (MA) in Islamic Studies in 1972, where he received the university’s Gold Medal for academic excellence. He later completed a PhD in Islamic Law in 1986, focusing on constitutional and jurisprudential frameworks within Islamic tradition.

During his academic tenure, Qadri became the youngest professor in the university’s history, teaching British, American, and Islamic constitutional law. He also served on the university’s Syndicate, Senate, and Academic Council, its highest governing bodies.

=== Legal and scholarly contributions ===
Before entering academia full-time, Qadri practiced law in Jhang’s district courts. His expertise in Islamic jurisprudence led to his appointment as a Jurist Consult for Pakistan’s Supreme Court and Federal Shariat Court, where he influenced landmark rulings on issues such as blasphemy laws and gender equality in blood money (diya) cases.

=== Influences and ideological foundations ===
Qadri’s intellectual development was shaped by his father’s Sufi teachings and his studies under scholars like Tahir Allauddin Al-Qadri Al-Gillani and Maulana Ziauddin Madani.

=== Notable early works ===
By his late 20s, Qadri had already authored significant texts on Islamic law and theology, including Islamic Penal System and its Philosophy (1986), reflecting his early engagement with contemporary legal debates.

== Founding of Minhaj-ul-Quran International ==
Minhaj-ul-Quran International is an organization established on 17 October 1980, with branches in over a hundred countries. The organization states that its mission is to promote religious moderation, effective education, inter-faith dialogue and harmony, and a moderate interpretation of Islam, drawing on methods of Sufism. In March 2011, the United Nations Economic and Social Council granted special consultative status to Minhaj-ul-Quran International.

== Political career ==
In May 1989, he founded Pakistan Awami Tehreek (PAT) and successfully contested elections in 1990, becoming a Member of the National Assembly. However, on 29 November 2004, Qadri announced his resignation from the National Assembly of Pakistan in protest of the counter-terrorism policies of then-President Pervez Musharraf, whom he viewed as dictatorial. Subsequently, in 2005, he relocated to Canada.

=== Long March 2012 ===
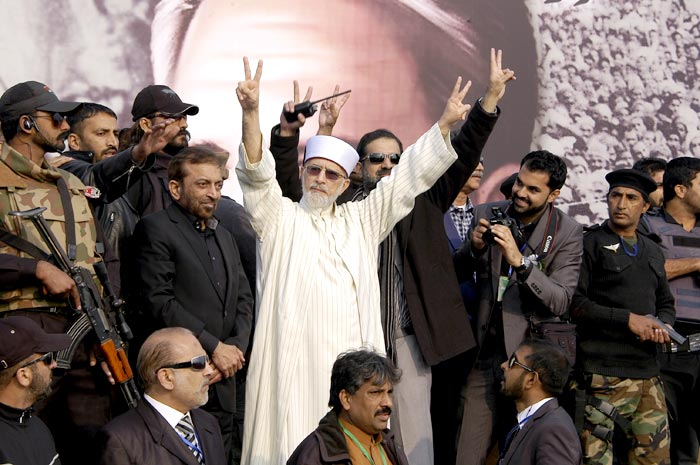
Qadri leading a rally at Minar-e-Pakistan, December 2012

In December 2012, after residing in Toronto, Canada for seven years, Qadri returned to Pakistan and launched a political campaign. He called for a "million-men" march in Islamabad to protest against the government's corruption. He demanded the establishment of an independent body to conduct electoral reforms, with the aim of ensuring free and fair elections. Additionally, he stated that if the constitutional requirements were not met, he would reject the upcoming elections.

On 14 January 2013, a crowd marched down the city's main avenue, with thousands of people pledging to engage in a sit-in until their demands were met.

When he commenced the long march from Lahore, approximately 50,000 people accompanied him. He addressed the rally in front of parliament, stating, "There is no Parliament; there is a group of looters, thieves, and dacoits.. Our lawmakers are the lawbreakers." After four days of sit-in, the Government and Qadri signed an agreement called the Islamabad Long March Declaration, which promised electoral reforms and increased political transparency.

Critics have alleged that the protests were a ploy by the Pakistan Armed Forces to delay elections and undermine the influence of the civilian government. They have pointed to Qadri's close ties to the military, dual nationality, and questionable foreign and Pakistani sources of funding as evidence to support their claims. Lawyers for the Supreme Court of Pakistan asserted that Qadri's demands are unfeasible because they conflict with the Constitution of Pakistan. The Tribune reported on 17 February 2013, that Qadri seemed to have capitulated on most of his demands in the Islamabad Long March Declaration.

=== Long March 2014 ===
On 17 June 2014, a violent clash occurred between the Punjab Police and Pakistan Awami Tehreek activists resulting in the deaths of several protesters from police gunfire. Tahir-ul-Qadri said the police refused to log a First Information Report. The Baqir Najfi inquiry found that police actively participated in the massacre to remove barriers that were installed on orders of the High Court.

Tahir-ul-Qadri's flight was scheduled to land at Islamabad airport; however, the Pakistani authorities denied landing permission, leading to the plane being diverted to Lahore airport. Tahir-ul-Qadri expressed concerns about potential harm from the Government of Punjab, and was personally escorted by the convoy of the Governor of Punjab to his residence in Model Town, Lahore.

As of the end of September 2014, the Inqilab March began, with sit-in protests with allied partner Imran Khan, chairman and founder of Tehreek-e-Insaaf (PTI) and organiser of 2014 Azadi March, in the capital of Pakistan, Islamabad.

Imran Khan and Tahir-ul-Qadri did not fully join their protest marches nor decline to support each other. On 10 August 2014, Qadri formally announced that his party's political march, the Inqilab March, would proceed parallel with PTI's Azadi march. Both marches were organised to take different routes, albeit closely mirroring each other. It is apparent that the two parties have similar objectives yet different aims and strategies. The announcement of two parallel marches by parties in opposition gave rise to speculation that a coalition between PTI and PAT was possible. The chiefs of the two parties never clearly stipulated a formal coalition; but an informal agreement to support each other was achieved.

On 21 August 2014, Qadri said that the government had not been allowing his workers to supply food items and potable water to the participants of the sit-in.

The Daily Dawn of 31 August 2014 claimed that hundreds of people were injured in the federal capital as police battled throngs of protesters led by Pakistan Tehreek-i-Insaf and Pakistan Awami Tehreek.

Then Prime Minister Nawaz Sharif appointed Chief of Army Staff General Raheel Sharif to act as a mediator. General Raheel Sharif met with Tahir-ul-Qadri and Imran Khan to end the sit-in. It was due to the intervention of General Raheel Sharif that the police report was logged. Tahir-ul-Qadri congratuled his supporters in their struggle for justice.

It was reported that Tahir-ul-Qadri led the Eid prayer at Islamabad's D-Chowk. The congregation was attended by Imran Khan and other political leaders, including Raja Nasir Abbas Jafary of MWM. Animal sacrifies were also offered in the name of God following the sunnah of Ibrahim and his son Ismail.

On 14 September 2019, Qadri announced his retirement from politics and transferred leadership of the PAT to the party's council.

== Events ==
=== Anti-Terrorism Camp ===
In August 2010, Qadri held an anti-terrorism camp for Muslim youth at the University of Warwick with the aim of tackling extremism in the UK. He organised the camp under the auspices of Minhaj-ul-Quran UK.

=== World Economic Forum ===
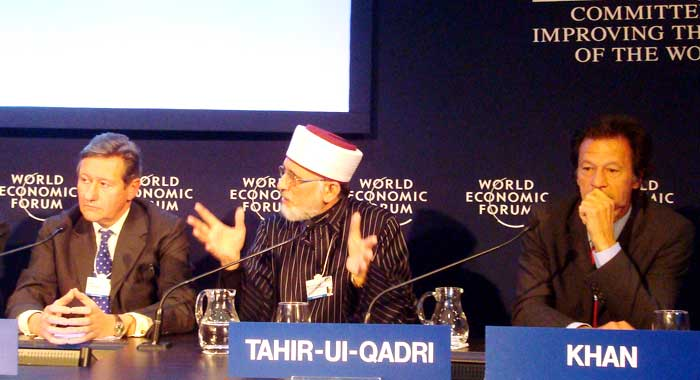
Qadri while addressing the session 'The Reality of Terrorism' at the Annual Meeting 2011 of the World Economic Forum

In 2011, he spoke at the WEF that took place in Davos, Switzerland.

=== Lahore Public Gathering 2014 ===
Seven days after the Faisalabad Gathering, Qadri made a public gathering in Lahore on 19 October 2014.

=== Lahore Clash 2014 ===
The 2014 Lahore Clash, more commonly known as the Model Town Tragedy (Urdu: سانحہ ماڈل ٹاؤن) or the Lahore massacre, was a violent clash that ensued between the Punjab Police and Pakistan Awami Tehreek activists on 17 June 2014 resulting in several protesters being killed by the police gunfire. Five police officers remain under arrest. The standoff lasted for almost 11 hours when the police's anti-encroachment squad launched an operation to remove the barriers from the road leading to the offices of Minhaj-ul-Quran and the residence of PAT founder Muhammad Tahir-ul-Qadri in Model Town, Lahore. Although, police officials were given a court order by PAT leaders, stating "due to terrorism issues, place security barriers in front of Minhaj-ul-Quran and the residence of PAT founder Qadri", but the police still attacked.

The incident was broadcast live on various local news channels and there were conflicting accounts of how the standoff began. Police claimed that they were attacked by people inside the PAT secretariat, a claim that is denied by party chief Qadri. In the live footage broadcast on television, the policemen were shown firing assault rifles and lobbing tear gas canisters at the protesting masses while the protesters threw stones at the police for defence. Qadri strongly condemned the attack and called it the worst form of state terrorism. Qadri vowed to avenge the deaths of his political workers by bringing about a revolution that would hasten the end of the rule of prime minister Nawaz Sharif and his brother Shahbaz Sharif.

=== The Day of Martyrs ===
Qadri and his party observed Youm-e-Shuhada (Day of Martyrs) at 9 August 2014 in Tehreek-e-Minhaj ul Quran secretariat in Model Town. A country-wide clash occurred between police and the workers of PAT. After the gathering of people, He assured his supporters and the government that the rally on 10 August would be peaceful while requesting his followers to bring their prayer mats for recitation of the Quran.

=== Other events ===
He has been invited to deliver his lectures by several organisations.

In July 2011, he gave a lecture on the issues of terrorism and integration at the Parliament of New South Wales in Sydney, Australia where he was invited by the member of the NSW Legislative Council, Shaoquett Moselmane MLC. Qadri also made appearances on Australian media, where he discussed Islam, terrorism and possible troop withdrawals from Afghanistan. On 24 September 2011, Minhaj-ul-Quran convened the "Peace for Humanity Conference" at Wembley Arena in London where Tahir-ul-Qadri and the assembled speakers issued a declaration of peace on behalf of religious representatives of several faiths, scholars, politicians, and 12,000 participants present from various countries. This conference was endorsed by, or received supportive messages from, the Grand Imam of Al-Azhar University, Ban Ki-moon (Secretary-General of the United Nations), Ekmeleddin İhsanoğlu (Secretary General of the Organisation of Islamic Cooperation), David Cameron (British Prime Minister), Nick Clegg (British Deputy Prime Minister), Rowan Williams (Archbishop of Canterbury) and others. On 30 November 2011, Qadri delivered a lecture at the "Peaceful Future of Afghanistan" conference in Istanbul, Turkey which was organised by the Center for World Religions, Diplomacy and Conflict Resolution of George Mason University together with Marmara University and was attended by more than 120 Afghan leaders.

On 22 February 2012, Qadri visited Delhi for a four-week tour of India. Qadri delivered a message of peace and said: "Terrorism has no place in Islam", while addressing the fatwa book launch in Delhi. People gathered to listen to Qadri along with government officials in Gujarat. Qadri also urged the Pakistani and Indian governments to reduce their defence expenditures and instead spend money on the welfare of poor people. He also visited Ajmer, where he was given a large reception, at which he gave a lecture on Sufism. On 4 January 2015, he declared terrorism as biggest problem of the world.

=== Fatwa on Terrorism ===
The Fatwa on Terrorism and Suicide Bombings is a 600-page (Urdu version), 512-page (English version) is an Islamic decree by Qadri which demonstrates from the Quran and Sunnah that terrorism and suicide bombings are unjust and evil, and thus un-Islamic. It was published in London as a book. This fatwa is a direct refutation of the ideology of al-Qaeda and the Taliban. It is one of the most extensive Islamic anti-terrorism rulings, an "absolute" condemnation of terrorism without "any excuses or pretexts" which goes further than ever and declares that terrorism is kufr under Islamic law. The launch was organised by Minhaj-ul-Quran UK. Qadri said during the launch that "Terrorism is terrorism, violence is violence and it has no place in Islamic teaching and no justification can be provided for it, or any kind of excuses or ifs or buts."

The fatwa received widespread media attention and was positively covered by the international press.

According to CNN, experts see the fatwa as a significant blow to terrorist recruiting. CNN's Amanpour show added the fatwa summary to its website and declared it to be fatwa for peace, while the US State Department declares the fatwa to be significant step in taking Islam back from terrorists.

Before it had been released, Douglas Murray described the Fatwa on Terrorism, in an article in the Evening Standard, as "potentially important", although he said "A single-fatwa will not change the level of denial and self criticism inherent in so much of modern Islam".

ITV news channel questioned the credibility of the fatwa and asks if it was not by the British government because senior counter-terrorism officials from Scotland Yard and MI5 were present at the launch.

The 512-page English book version of the fatwa, Fatwa on Terrorism and Suicide Bombings, (London: Minhaj-ul-Quran, 2011. ISBN 978-0-9551888-9-3) has a foreword by John Esposito and an introduction by Joel Hayward, both of whom share Qadri's scholarly assessment that, regardless of any intention, the evil of terrorism remains evil and must be exposed, opposed and condemned. It also has a certification from the Islamic Research Council of Al-Azhar, Egypt issued on 9 January 2011.

The Fatwa on Terrorism and Suicide Bombings has been officially endorsed by Al-Azhar University in Cairo, Egypt. In January 2011, the fatwa was discussed at the World Economic Forum Annual Meeting 2011. In June 2011, Pope Benedict XVI received a copy of the fatwa from representatives of Minhaj Interfaith Relations. The Pope reportedly appreciated that it promoted peace, harmony and interfaith dialogue.

The Fatwa on Terrorism and Suicide Bombings was reviewed positively by Kemal Argon who published a review in the Journal of Rotterdam Islamic and Social Sciences, Vol. 2, No. 1, 2011, pp. 149–160. Islamic University of Rotterdam, Netherlands.

=== Invitation to OIC ===
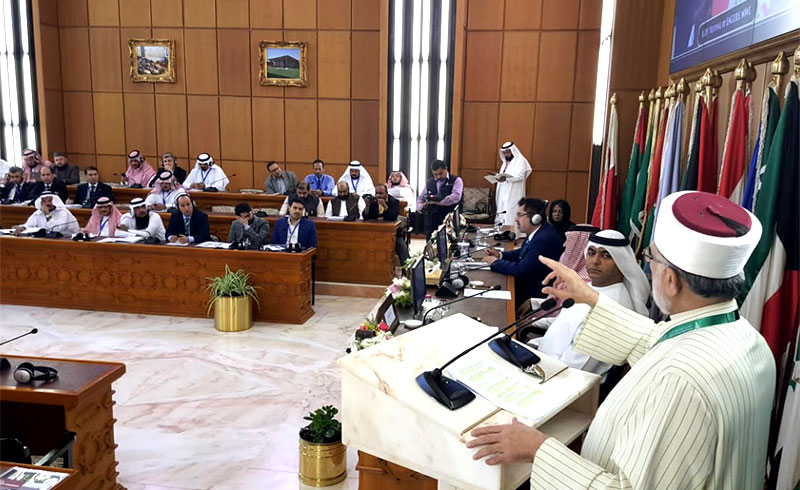
Dr Tahir-ul-Qadri addresses OIC conference on The Role of Education in Prevention of Terrorism and Extremism.

On 7 April 2019, Qadri addressed scholars at the OIC meeting in Riyadh and presented Minhaj-ul-Quran's Counter Terrorism Syllabus.

== Views ==
According to one newspaper pundit, the legal-theological opinion by Qadri in his fatwa on terrorism creates an impression that there is a consensus in Islam on the Khawarij. Think Magazine (World Religions) cited Dr. Tahir ul Qadri as providing a competing vision of Islam against that of Osama Bin Laden. In November 2017, Mandla Mandela (the grandson of South African revolutionary leader Nelson Mandela) visited Pakistan after his conversion to Islam in 2016. He arrived in Pakistan on Tahir ul Qadri's invitation to attend Tajdar-e-Khatam-e-Nabuwwat Conference in Pakistan.

== Works ==
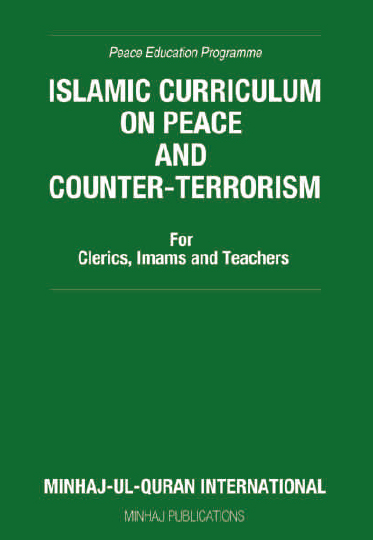
Islamic Curriculum on Peace and Counter-Terrorism by Tahir-ul-Qadri

He has authored 1000 works out of which 550 are published books, including an "eight-volume, 7,000-page Qur’anic Encyclopaedia in English covering all 6,000-plus verses of the Koran." He has delivered over 6000 lectures and has been teaching subjects such as Islamic jurisprudence, theology, sufism, Islamic philosophy, law, Islamic politics, hadith, seerah, and many other traditional sciences. His works include:

- Islamic Concept of Crime (1985)
- Islamic Concept of Law (1987)
- Islam and Christianity (1999)
- Peace & Submission (2011)
- Muhammad the Merciful (2014)
- Fatwa on Suicide Bombings and Terrorism (2014) translated by Shaykh Abdul Aziz Dabbagh
- Islam on Mercy and Compassion (2014)
- Creation of Man - A Review of Qur'an and Modern Embryology (2017)
- Beseeching for Help (Istighathah) published by CreateSpace Independent Publishing Platform in 2017

== Legacy ==
Qadri has delivered over 6,000 lectures and authored more than 1,000 books in Urdu, English, and Arabic, with over 450 of them published. As of 2022, he has featured in every edition of The 500 Most Influential Muslims since its first edition in 2009. In 2012, it was reported that Qadri was nominated for the Nobel Peace Prize.

Tahir-ul-Qadri has faced criticism from Islamic scholars and organizations for his unconventional views, such as celebration of Christmas. Some have labeled him as “misguided”, and Indian scholar Akhtar Raza Khan, issued a fatwa in 2014 declaring him a disbeliever.

The US government funded broadcaster, Radio liberty and the German public broadcaster, Deutsche Welle, have issued articles pointing out his contradictions in claiming to be in favour of democracy while also having previously called for the toppling of the Pakistani civilian government.
