= Tahir Allauddin Al-Qadri Al-Gillani =

Iraqi Sufi saint (1932–1991)

Syed Tahir Alauddin
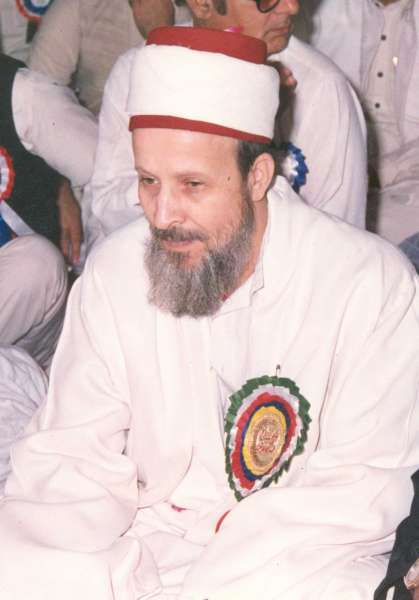
- Born: 18 June 1932; Baghdad, Mandatory Iraq
- Died: 7 June 1991 (aged 58); Germany
- Resting place: Lahore, Pakistan

Philosophical work
- Era: Modern Era
- Region: Iraq, Pakistan
- School: Qadiriyya Sufism
- Website: algillani.com

Syed Tahir Alauddin al-Gilani (السيد طاهر علاؤ الدين الجيلاني البغدادي) (18 June 1932 – 7 June 1991) formally referred to as His Holiness, Qudwat-ul-Awliya Naqeeb-ul-Ashraaf Huzoor Pir Syed Tahir Alauddin al-Gilani al-Qadri al-Baghdadi, was a 20th-century Iraqi Sufi Saint who was the head of the Qadiriyya Baghdadia Spiritual Tariqa. He was the custodian of the Shrine of Abdul Qadir al-Gilani and has been accepted by many as a reformer of Sufism. Born in Baghdad on 18 June 1932, he traced his lineage by seventeen steps to Abdul-Qadir Gilani and 28 steps to the Islamic prophet Muhammad.

In 1956, Al-Gilani left Baghdad and migrated to Pakistan, where he settled permanently in Quetta. He stayed in Pakistan until the end of his life. He went to Germany for medical treatment in May 1991, and died the following month. He was buried in Lahore, Pakistan. He had three sons, Syed Mahmood Mohiyuddin al-Gilani al-Qadri, Syed Abdul Qadir Jamaluddin al-Gilani al-Qadri and Syed Muhammad Ziauddin al-Gillani al-Qadri, who propagate the teachings of Silsilah e Qadiriyya Tahiria.

== Background and education ==
Al-Gillani came from an Iraqi Syed family of Baghdad who are the custodians of the mausoleum of Abdul-Qadir Gilani. He is the youngest of the six sons of Syed Mahmood Hussamuddin al-Gillani. His grandfather, Syed Abd Al-Rahman Al-Gillani, was the first Prime Minister of Iraq (11 November 1920 – 20 November 1922) following the dissolution of the Ottoman Empire. The current Custodian of the Shrine of Abdul-Qadir Gilani is his elder-brother, Syed Ahmed Zafar Al-Gillani, who also served as the ambassador of Iraq in Pakistan from 1978 until 1992.

As a child, Al-Gillani would spend the entire night alone in seclusion at the shrine of his ancestor Shaykh Abdul Qadir Gilani. He received his spiritual training and mentoring directly from his father Mahmood Hussamuddin, who was a Sufi and the custodian of the mausoleum of Abdul-Qadir Gilani. Al-Gillani completed his other traditional religious studies at the Madrassa of Syed Sultan Ali in Baghdad, where he studied under scholars of Iraq including Syed Ali Al-Faridi, Qasim Al-Qaysi, Khalil Ar-Rab'ee and the Grand Mufti of Iraq.

== Migration ==
In 1956, Al-Gillani left the city of Baghdad and migrated to Pakistan after receiving spiritual orders from Abdul Qadir Gilani. Al-Gillani first completed 40 days of seclusion (Chilla) at the Shrine of the Sufi saint Data Ganj Baksh Ali Hujwiri in Lahore. He then settled in Quetta, where he established the Darbar-e-Ghousia religious school. In honour of Al-Gilani's presence, the government of Balochistan renamed the road to Al-Gillani Road. Darbar-e-Ghousia became the official headquarters of Tariqa Qadiria in the sub-continent and is still run by the sons of Al-Gillani.

He received a personal visit from President General Ayub Khan, to welcome him to Pakistan. General Ayub Khan pledged Bay'ah (Oath of Allegiance) in the Qadiriyya Tariqa at the hands of Al-Gillani. Al-Gillani was visited by presidents, politicians, tribal leaders and religious scholars for his prayers, advice and guidance. Pakistani President Zia ul Haq is also known to have had both pledged Bay'ah on Al-Gillani's hands, whilst leaders such as President Saddam Hussein, the Sultan of Brunei, Zulfiqar Ali Bhutto and Nawaz Shareef, would visit him or stay in contact.

== Life sketch ==
Following in the footsteps of his ancestor Abdul Qadir Gilani, Al-Gillani spent the majority of his life in spiritual retreat (khalwah) and undertaking spiritual exercises (mujāhidah). There is little known about Al-Gillani's life as he would strictly forbid his followers from writing about him. Al-Gillani was very strict in adherence to the laws of Shariah and Tariqah, and until he died he worked tirelessly at propagating the teachings of his ancestor Abdul Qadir Gilani and the other mashaikh of the Qadiriyya path. He encouraged Islamic Unity and would often speak out against acts which were considered bad innovations and rituals that had crept inside Tassawuf

Since a young age, he began touring across the world for propagating Islam and the teachings of Tariqa Qadiria. His visits included Saudi Arabia, India, Bangladesh, United Kingdom, Germany, Egypt, Canada, Indonesia, Singapore, Norway, the Netherlands, Belgium, Sri Lanka and the Persian Gulf countries. During Al-Gillani's visit of Ceylon in 1958, he established a care-home in Ceylon for needy and orphaned children.

When Al-Gillani visited India in 1952, he visited the city of Bareilly on the invitation of Mustafa Raza Khan Qadri, the Grand Mufti of India. When Al-Gillani reached Bareilly, his car was lifted by the hundreds of thousands of devotees and carried to the residence of Mufti Mustafa Raza Khan. It is reported that Mufti Mustafa Raza Khan was so respectful of Al-Gillani that he remained barefoot for the duration of his stay and would stand to serve him. On this occasion, Maulana Mustafa Raza Khan also made several of his family members pledge Baith on the hands of Al-Gillani including the later Grand Mufti of India Mufti Akhtar Raza Khan. During this visit to India, Al-Gillani was visited by the heads of major Sufi Tariqas situated here, including Abdul Qadeer Badayuni Qadri and Muhammad Abdul Qadeer Siddiqi Qadri.

In the 1960s, Al-Gillani was invited to the city of Faisalabad by the grand scholar of Pakistan Muhadith e Azam e Pakistan Maulana Sardar Ahmed Qadri to attend the opening ceremony of Jamia Amjadia Rizvia. To welcome Al-Gillani and for his protocol, Maulana Sardar Ahmed Qadri arranged for rolls of white silk to be spread the entire journey from his madrasah to the Railway Station. It is reported that a small spot had been left uncovered near the door of the madrasah and Maulana Sardar Ahmed Qadri kneeled down and used his own beard to sweep this area clean.

After a three-storey stage was erected, Al-Gillani was seated at the top and covered in rose petals, and Maulana Sardar Ahmed Qadri and other sheikhs sat beneath his feet on the second storey and Maulana Sardar Ahmed placed his own sons and students on the last level. At the conclusion of the gathering, the crowds were uncontrollable as they rushed in the hope of meeting or touching Al-Gilani so Maulana Sardar Ahmed ordered for a side wall had to be demolished so Al-Gillani could leave safely.

Al-Gillani would be invited as main guest to conferences and events, being held both nationally and internationally. These include the International Khatm e Nabuwat Conference held at Minar e Pakistan, the inauguration of Minhaj-ul-Quran International held at Lahore in 1984, the International Minhaj-ul-Quran Conference held at Lahore in 1987, the Al-Hejaz Conference held in London and the historic International Minhaj ul Quran Conference held at Wembley Arena, London in 1988

== Marriage and children ==
Al-Gillani married the Princess of Kalat Princess Munawar Sultan – the daughter of Khan-e-Azzam Mir Ahmad Yaar Khan of Kalat. From this marriage, Tahir Allauddin Al-Qadri Al-Gillani has three Sons and Three Daughters.

- Syed Mahmood Mohyuddin al-Gilani
  (born 14 July 1968)
- Syed Abdul Qadir Jamaluddin al-Gilani
  (born on 4 June 1970)
- Syed Muhammad Ziyauddin al-Gilani
  (born on 28 May 1976.

== Children ==
The three sons follow in the footsteps of their father and ancestors and have devoted their lives for the propagation of Tariqa e Qadiriah. For this purpose, they visit places across Pakistan and beyond and administer Baith in Silsilah e Qadiria Tahiria.

- The eldest son, Syed Mahmood Mohiyuddin was born on 14 July 1968. He has three sons; Syed Tahir Hussamuddin Al-Gillani, Syed Abdur Rahman Saifuddin Al-Gillani and Syed Ahmed Nooruddin Al-Gillani. Syed Mahmood Mohiyuddin has devoted his time to the spiritual training and welfare of his followers. He has a circle of tens of thousands of followers across the world and annually on occasions such as Laylatul Qadar, thousands of people visit the shrine of Al-Gillani in Lahore to pledge baith on his hands.
- The middle son, Syed Abdul Qadir Jamaluddin was born on 4 June 1970. He has one son, Yahya Shamsuddin Al-Gillani who was born on 22 February 2010. He completed his M.A in English & MSc in Foreign Relations. He has a Member of the National Assembly (MNA) Pakistan. He travels across Pakistan and the rest of the world for propagating the teachings of Tariqa Qadiria. Syed Abdul Qadir Jamaluddin Al-Gillani has a circle of followers across the world, who visit him for his prayers, help and guidance. People from all walks of life flock to the official family residence in Karachi (Al-Gilani House), to see him and pledge bay'ah at his hands.
- The youngest son, Syed Muhammad Ziauddin was born on 28 May 1976. He has one son, Syed Tahir Allauddin Al-Gillani who was born on 12 June 2008. He has completed his M.A in Pakistani Studies in addition to gaining a LLB. Syed Muhammad Ziauddin Al-Gillani spends most of his time in Khalwa (Spiritual Seclusion) at Quetta, but from time to time tours overseas for the propagation of Tariqa e Qadiria. He also has a large circle of devotees across the world.

== Spiritual deputies ==
In 2007, Tahir Alauddin's Son Syed Muhammad Ziauddin al-Qadri al-Gilani inaugurated Darbar-e-Ghousia Qadiria Tahiria in Bradford, England. This Darbar is run by Syed Khalid Ali Tahiri after receiving approval from the sons of Al-Gillani. Syed Khalid Ali Tahiri Qadri was a student from a young age and was appointed as the tutor to Syed Muhammad Ziauddin al-Qadri al-Gilani during his childhood.

In 2011, Syed Muhammad Ziauddin al-Qadri al-Gilani visited Bradford for a second occasion, where he presided over a conference that has been held annually by Syed Khalid Ali Tahiri to commemorate the death anniversary of his Shaykh Syed Tahir Alauddin al-Qadri al-Gilani During this visit, he also visited Darbar-e-Ghousia Qadiria Tahiria UK and the residence of Syed Khalid Ali Tahiri.

Syed Muhammad Ziauddin al-Qadri al-Gilani also presides an annual Grand Milad e Mustafa conference oganized by an Islamic organization of Balochistan Bazam E A'ala Hazrat Al Aalami and he is also the chief patron of the Bazam E A'ala Hazrat Al Aalami since the foundation of Bazam E A'ala Hazrat al Aalami in 2016.

His spiritual deputies are numerous, including his children and grandchildren, the family of the Ahl al-Bayt, as well as a number of renowned scholars.

== Works ==
Al-Gillani authored books during his stay in Pakistan. Some of his books are:

- Mahboob Subhani
- Tuhfa Al-Tahiria Aowrad Al-Qadria
- Ghous Al Azam (English)
- Shajrah
- Ziaraat Muqamaat Muqadassa
- Tazkarah-e-Qadriah (Urdu and Pushto)
- Wazaif-e-Qadriah (Urdu)
- Nimaz Book (Urdu)

== See also ==
- Abdul-Qadir Gilani
- Abd Al-Rahman Al-Gillani
- Islamic scholars
