= Minhaj Welfare Foundation =

Non-governmental welfare organisation

- Founded: 17 October 1989
- Founder: Muhammad Tahir-ul-Qadri
- Type: Charitable organisation
- Purpose: To provide food, water, education and health care to the needy.
- Location: Lahore
- Key people: Faisal Hussain Mashadi, Tehseen Khalid, Sagheer Akhtar, Shahid Kaleem, Adnan Sohail, Muhammad Ahmad Moeen
- Website: www.minhajwelfare.org

Minhaj Welfare Foundation (MWF) is a non-governmental international relief and welfare organisation and a branch of Minhaj-ul-Quran International. It was founded on 17 October 1989 by Muhammad Tahir-ul-Qadri, and registered in the UK.

MWF's projects can be divided into four major categories: education, health care, emergency aid and welfare support.

== Selected works ==
- 70,000 free eye-medical treatments.
- Relief work in the Swat and Malakand division by providing relief aid. This included temporary shelters, medical dispensaries, educational establishments and food packets. Minhaj Welfare Foundation has publicly vowed that it will not stop the relief work in Swat until every migrant has returned home.
- Emergency relief in response to the 2010 Pakistan floods, Cyclone Sidr (Bangladesh), tsunami (Indonesia), Sudan, Gaza Crisis, SWAT valley.
- Each year MWF helps to organise and manage the second largest Itekaaf (Spiritual Retreat during Ramadan) in the whole world after the one in Makkah and Madina.
- In Pakistan, MWF was the first charity in the history of the country to arrange and fund collective-marriage ceremonies for the needy.
- Aghosh Orphan Care Home.
