= London Declaration for Global Peace and Resistance against Extremism 2011 =

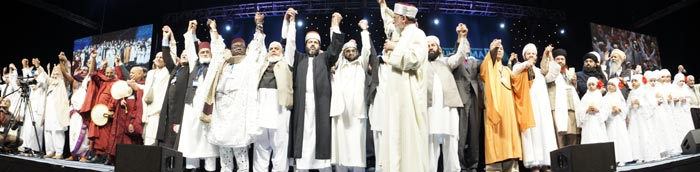
London Declaration for Global Peace and Resistance against Extremism 2011

On 24 September 2011, Minhaj-ul-Quran organised a major "Peace for Humanity Conference" at Wembley Arena in London at which, under the auspices of Pakistani Islamic scholar Muhammad Tahir-ul-Qadri, its 12,000 attendees announced a global declaration denouncing racism, interfaith intolerance, extremism and terrorism.

Minhaj-ul-Quran strategist Joel Hayward wrote the declaration text for Qadri and was its second formal signatory after Qadri himself. Senior Al-Azhar University leaders and dignitaries then signed it before Minhaj-ul-Quran opened it up via the internet for public signing. They aim to get one million signatures within a year.

The London Declaration for Global Peace and Resistance against Extremism is intended as an interfaith document which unequivocally condemns all extremism and terrorism, "because at the heart of all religions is a belief in the sanctity of the lives of the innocent." The Declaration adds: "The indiscriminate nature of terrorism, which has in recent years killed far more civilians and other non-combatants than it has combatants, is un-Islamic, un-Judaic, un-Christian and it is indeed incompatible with the true teachings of all faiths." The London Declaration also "unequivocally condemn[s] anti-Semitism (including when sometimes it is disingenuously clothed as anti-Zionism), Islamophobia (including when it is sometimes disingenuously dressed up as patriotism) and all other forms of racism and xenophobia."

Muslim extremists tried to prevent the success of the Declaration via cyber-attacks on the website hosting it.

== See also ==
- Minhaj-ul-Quran International
- Fatwa on Terrorism
- The Amman Message
- Contemporary Islamic philosophy
