= Ziauddin Madani =

Islamic scholar and disciple of Imam Ahmad Raza Khan

Qutb e Medina Maulana Ziauddin Madani
- قطب مدینہ مولانا ضیاء الدین مدنی
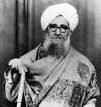
- Title: Qutb-e-Medina

Personal life
- Born: 1877 Sialkot, Punjab, British India, Now Pakistan
- Died: 2 October 1981 (aged 103–104) Medina, Saudi Arabia
- Resting place: Al-Baqi, Medina present-day Saudi Arabia
- Children: Sayyid Ridwan al-Madani

Religious life
- Religion: Islam
- Denomination: Sunni
- School: Hanafi
- Lineage: Siddiqui
- Movement: Barelvi

Muslim leader
- Post: Sufi and mystic
- Influenced by: Abu Hanifa; Ahmed Raza Khan Barelvi; Hassan Raza Khan
- Influenced: Muhammad Musa Amritsari; Ilyas Qadri

Zia'uddin Madani (Urdu: قطب مدینہ مولانا ضیاء الدین مدنی) was an Islamic scholar and Sufi Shaykh also known as Qutb-e-Madina. He lived for the most of his life in Medina. He was born in 1877 in Sialkot, British India and died on 2 October 1981, in Medina, Saudi Arabia. He was buried in Al-Baqi.

He was an Islamic scholar and disciple of Imam Ahmad Raza Khan. He was the spiritual teacher of Ilyas Qadri.

== Early life and education ==
He was born in 1877 AD (1294 AH) in Sialkot, Pakistan, to Sheikh Abdul Aziz. His family claims descent from Abu Bakr Siddique, a prominent companion of the Prophet Muhammad and the first caliph of Islam.

He received his early education in Sialkot and Lahore. He studied for four years in Pilibhit (Uttar Pradesh, India) and got his Islamic education under the supervision of Wasee Ahmad Muhaddis Soorti. He went to Karachi. After some time, travelled to Baghdad, Iraq to take blessings from Ghaus e Azam. He lived in Baghdad for 4 years and then travelled to Medina in 1900. He stayed in Medina for almost 77 years. He died on 2 October 1981. He is buried in the cemetery of Medina Jannat ul Baqi.

== Bay’at and Khilafat ==
He took the oath of spiritual allegiance from Imam Ahmad Raza Khan of Bareilly at the age of 18, who was the reviver of the 14th century, of the Qadriya movement of Abdul Qadir Jilani.

== See also ==
- Ahmad Raza Khan Barelvi
- Ilyas Qadri

== Bibliography ==
- Rana, Khalil Ahmad (1988). Anwaar-e-Qutb-e-Madinah (in Urdu) (1st ed.). Lahore: Markazi Majlis Raza.
- Rana, Khalil Ahmad (2013). Tajalliyat-e-Qutb-e-Madina (in Urdu) (1st ed.). Karachi: Anjuman Zia-e-Taiba.
- Qadri, Ilyas (2014). Sayyidi Qutb-e-Madinah (1st ed.). Karachi: Dawat-e-Islami.
