= Jamia-tul-Madina =

Islamic university chain

- جامعۃ المدینہ
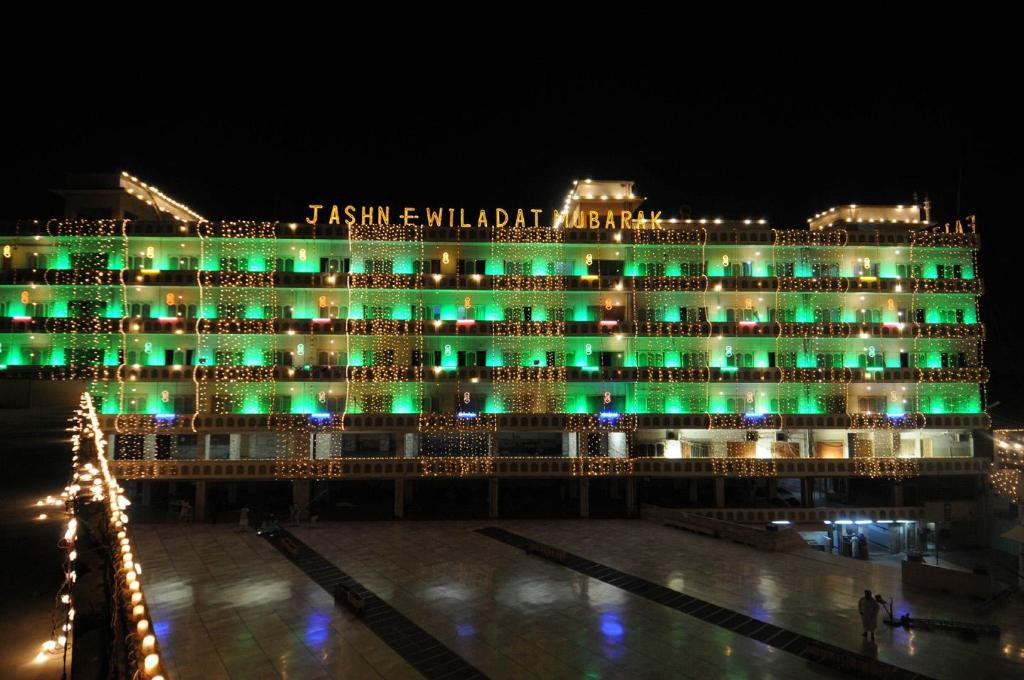
- Faizan-e-Madina Karachi
- Motto: مجھے اپنی اور ساری دنیا کے لوگوں کی اصلاح کی کوشش کرنی ہے، ان شاءاللّٰه عزوجل (Urdu)
- Motto in English: "I must strive to reform myself and people of the entire world."
- Type: Islamic university
- Established: 1995
- Affiliations: Islam
- Chancellor: Muhammad Ilyas Qadri
- Vice-Chancellor: Mufti Muhammad Qasim Qadri
- Students: 136,252 (approx., 2026)
- Location: Karachi, Pakistan
- Colours: Green
- Website: www.jamiatulmadina.net

Jamia-tul-Madina (Urdu: جامعۃ المدینہ) is a chain of Islamic universities in India, Pakistan and in European and other countries established by Dawat-e-Islami. The Jamia-tul-Madina is also known as Faizan-e-Madina. Dawat-e-Islami has grown its network of Madaris from Pakistan to Europe.

== History ==
The first Dars-e-Nizami class was taught in September 1994 in Godhra Colony, New Karachi, with over 50 students. The institution was initially called Madrasa-tul-Madinah and was renamed Jamia-tul-Madinah a few years later. Dawat-e-Islami states that the first branch of Jamia-tul-Madina was established in 1995 on the second floor of a Madrasa-tul-Madina building in Godhra Colony, Karachi.

== Branches ==
Jamia-tul-Madina has 1200+ branches in Pakistan, 11 in India and 18 in other countries. As of 2026, the official global website of Jamia-tul-Madina reports approximately 1,542 branches in 20 countries, about 136,252 students and 36,003 total graduates. An earlier statement by Dawat-e-Islami (last updated December 2023) gave figures of over 1,500 branches and over 124,000 students, boys and girls combined.

== Programmes ==
Weekly religious congregations are held regularly on weekends in every campus of Jamia-tul-Madina.

=== Affiliation and curriculum ===
Jamia-tul-Madina is affiliated with the Kanz-ul-Madaris Board International, the educational board of Dawat-e-Islami. Dawat-e-Islami states that the curriculum prescribed by the board is approved by the Higher Education Commission of Pakistan. In 2025, 168,449 students across Pakistan sat the board's annual examinations; this figure covers all Kanz-ul-Madaris-affiliated institutions, including Madaris-ul-Madina and Faizan Online Academy, and not Jamia-tul-Madina alone.

The core programme is Dars-e-Nizami (the Aalim or scholar course), a course of five to eight years that Dawat-e-Islami says is taught free of charge.

=== Model Jamia-tul-Madina ===
In 2025, Dawat-e-Islami announced admissions for Model Jamia-tul-Madina campuses in six cities of Pakistan, offering BS and MA programmes alongside Dars-e-Nizami. The announced BS programmes include Arabic, Islamic Studies, Education, and Islamic Banking and Finance, along with associate degrees in Islamic banking. Academic matters, examinations, certificates and degrees at these campuses are issued through Kanz-ul-Madaris.

=== Jamia-tul-Madina for girls ===
Dawat-e-Islami runs a Jamia-tul-Madina Girls department, which conducts the Dars-e-Nizami course for female students and teaches other branches of Islamic knowledge. The global Jamia-tul-Madina website has separate syllabus, department and notice-board sections for girls' campuses in Pakistan and internationally, along with a dedicated contact for girls' campuses in Pakistan and abroad. Its branch directory lists campuses by gender; girls' campuses are listed in Pakistani cities and towns including Gujranwala, Gujrat, Hafizabad, Multan and Sialkot. A Jamia-tul-Madina for Girls is also among the Dawat-e-Islami institutions in Faisalabad.

Female students may also complete the Faizan-e-Shariat course. On 21 July 2025, the Jamia-tul-Madina Girls Department held its annual turban ceremony in Sargodha, at which 104 students who completed Dars-e-Nizami and 53 who completed Faizan-e-Shariat (157 in total) were honoured; about 700 women from across the division attended. A similar gathering for female graduates of Dars-e-Nizami and Faizan-e-Shariat was held in Karachi on 25 September 2021.

In the United Kingdom, Dawat-e-Islami's Midlands region has full-time and part-time Jamia-tul-Madina campuses, one of which is a sisters' Jamia.

=== Graduation ceremonies ===
Dawat-e-Islami planned Dastar-e-Fazilat (graduation) ceremonies in nine major cities of Pakistan at the end of 2024 for graduates of Jamia-tul-Madina and Madrasa-tul-Madina. In Faisalabad, 158 students completed Dars-e-Nizami that year, and a ceremony was scheduled for 16 January 2025. The global website also lists graduation ceremonies for Jamia-tul-Madina USA (2025) and Jamia-tul-Madina UK (2026), and links to country websites for the UK and the USA.

=== In Pakistan ===
The number of students is 11,719 in Jamia-tul-Madina, Karachi, Pakistan.

=== In India ===
No.	Jamia tul Madina (Native name)	City, State
1	Faizan e Mujahid-E-Milat	Gopiganj, Uttar Pradesh
2	Faizan e Auliya	Ahmedabad, Gujarat
3	Faizan e Huzoor Sadrul Shariya	Varanasi, Uttar Pradesh
4	Faizan e Raza	Attar Bagh, Hyderabad, Telangana
5	Faizan e Siddique e Akbar	Tajganj, Agra, Uttar Pradesh

=== In other countries ===
Faizan-e-Madina institutes of Islamic education are spread in various countries around the world.

- Faizan-e-Madina, United Kingdom Peterborough
- Faizan-e-Madina, Hong Kong in Tsuen Wan

Dawat-e-Islami UK reports about 950 students currently enrolled in Jamia-tul-Madina UK.

No.	Country name	Jamia tul Madina (Native name)	Address	Ref
1	Nepal	Jamia-tul-Madina	Nepalgunj	
2	Kenya	Faizan-e-Madina kanzul Iman	Mombasa, Ganjoni	
3	England	Faizan-e-Madina	Birmingham	
4	Sri Lanka	Faizan-e-Madina	Girls of over 100 girls	
5	Peterborough	Faizan-e-Madina	United Kingdom	
6	Tsuen Wan	Faizan-e-Madina	Hong Kong	

== See also ==
- List of Islamic educational institutions
