= Jamia Ahmadiyya Sunnia Kamil Madrasa =

Islamic religious educational institution in Bangladesh

Jamia Ahmadiyya Sunnia Kamil Madrasah
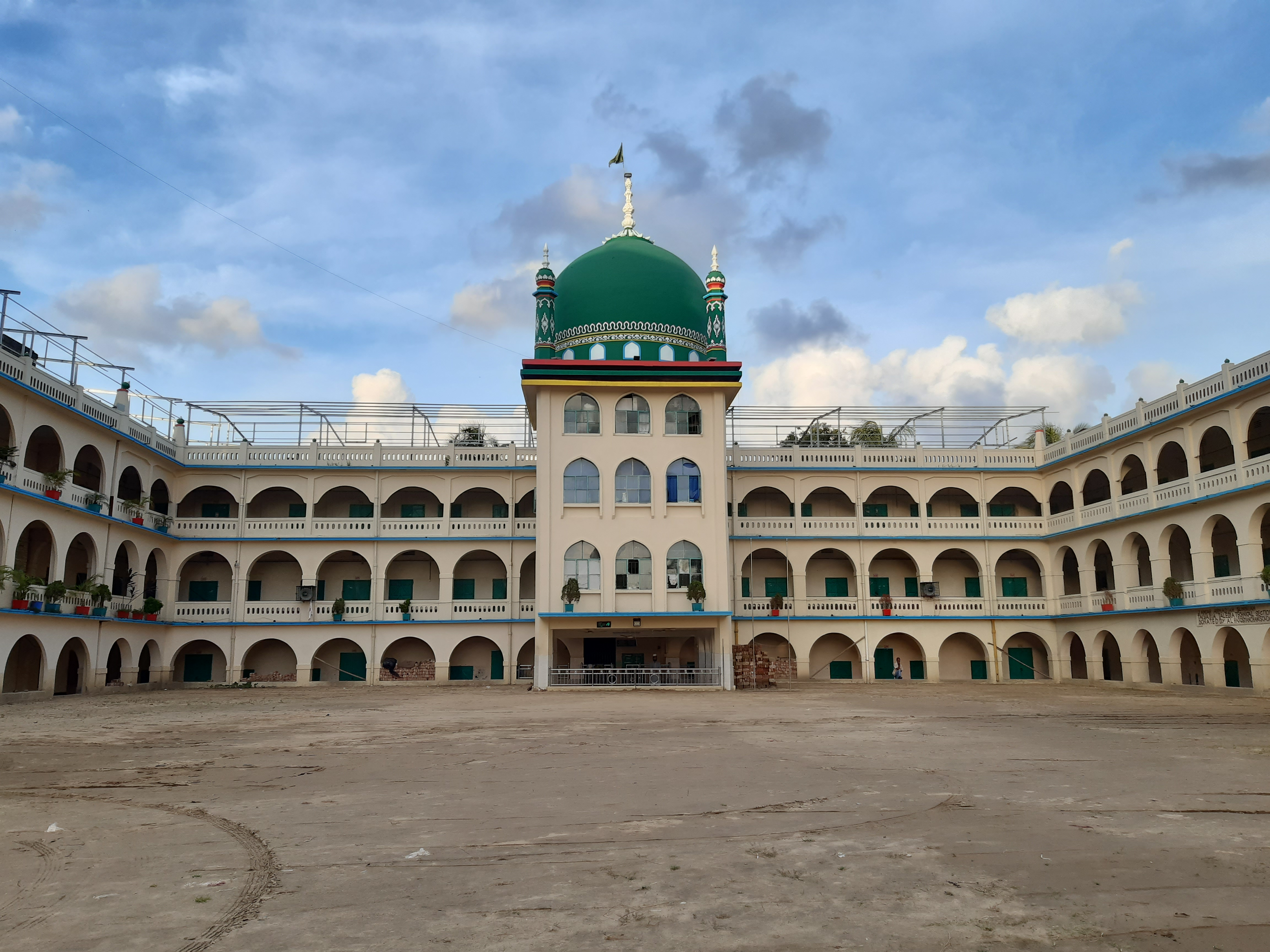
- Type: Islamic university
- Established: 1954
- Founders: Syed Ahmad Shah Sirikoti
- Chairman: Professor Abul Mohsin Mohammad Yahya Khan
- Principal: Kazi Mohammad Abdul Alim Rizvi
- Students: 6000
- Postgraduates: 4000 (2012)
- Location: Sholashahar, Chandgaon, Panchlaish, Chittagong, Bangladesh; 22.3750°N 91.8369°E
- Campus: Urban

Jamia Ahmadiyya Sunnia Kamil Madrasah (Arabic: الجامعة الأحمدية السنية الكاملية; Bengali: জামেয়া আহমদিয়া সুন্নিয়া কামিল মাদরাসা)), popularly known as the Jamia Ahmadiyya is prominent higher educational institution in Sholashahar, Chandgaon, Chittagong, Bangladesh. Established in 1954, it is one of the largest and oldest Sunni Barelvi madrasah in Bangladesh. Renowned Islamic scholar, Syed Ahmad Shah Sirikoti was its founder. It was established on the basis of doctrine of Imam Ahmed Raza Khan. Syed Muhammad Tayyab Shah was the patron of the institution. Now Syed Muhammad Taher Shah and Syed Muhammad Sabir Shah are patron of the institution.

== Degrees and courses ==
Following courses are taught.

Primary level – Urdu; Persian; Arabic; Nahu-Sarf; Sirat-un-Nabi; Fiqh etc. are taught along with the mathematics; history; Bengali; English and geography.

- Secondary level – higher Arabic grammar; Arabic literature; Fiqh; logic.
- Higher secondary level – higher Fiqh and Usul-e-Fiqh; higher logic; higher Arabic literature; higher economics; higher philosophy; higher Islam history.
- Graduate level – Hadith; Tafsir; Arabic and Persian poetry; solar science.
- Post graduate level – six major Hadith Books: Bukhari Sharif, Muslim Sharif, Abu Dawd Sharif, Tirmidi Sharif, Nasaee Sharif and Ibn Majah are mainly taught.
- Beyond post graduate level – further study in the field of Islamic law; Arabic language and literature; higher Hadith study, Bengali literature and Islamic studies.

== Administration ==
It is under Anjuman-E-Rahmania Ahmadia Sunnia Trust which is running at least hundred madrasahs of Sunni Barelvi ideology in Bangladesh.

== See also ==
- Jamia Nizamia
- Jamiatur Raza
- Islam in India
- Al-Jame-atul-Islamia
- Manzar-e-Islam
