= Asad Muhammad Saeed as-Sagharji =

Syrian scholar

- Died: 21 August 2015
- Burial place: Madina

Academic work
- School or tradition: Shadhili Sufi
- Main interests: Hanafi Fiqh

Asad Muhammad Saeed as-Sagharji (أسعد محمد سعيد الصاغرجي) was a Syrian Islamic scholar specializing in the field of Hanafi Fiqh, who lived in Damascus, Syria. He was the head Imam of Jamia al-Umawi in Damascus, and was the leading Faqih (jurist) in Syria. As-Sagharji belonged to the Shadhili Sufi order. He is the author of several books. One of the Shaykh’s most prominent teachers was the distinguished Syrian scholar, Al-Shaykh al-Sayyid Ibrahīm al-Ya’qūbī.

== Works ==
The Shaykh was a prolific author and produced a number of notable works,

His al-Fiqh al-Hanafiyyah wa Adillatahu is a comprehensive manual in three volumes on the key evidence from the Qur'an and Sunnah proving the Hanafi Fiqh. Along with the Shaykh’s other works such as Shu’ab al-īmān, Sayyidunā Muhammad Rasūlallāh, Zawjatun-Nabī and Hajj wal-‘Umra, the book is studied in many Arab universities, including the renowned Al-Azhar University in Cairo.

== Death ==
He died on 21 August 2015 and was buried in Madina Jannatul Baqi cemetery.
