= Minhaj-ul-Quran =

Pakistani international NGO

Minhaj-ul-Quran International
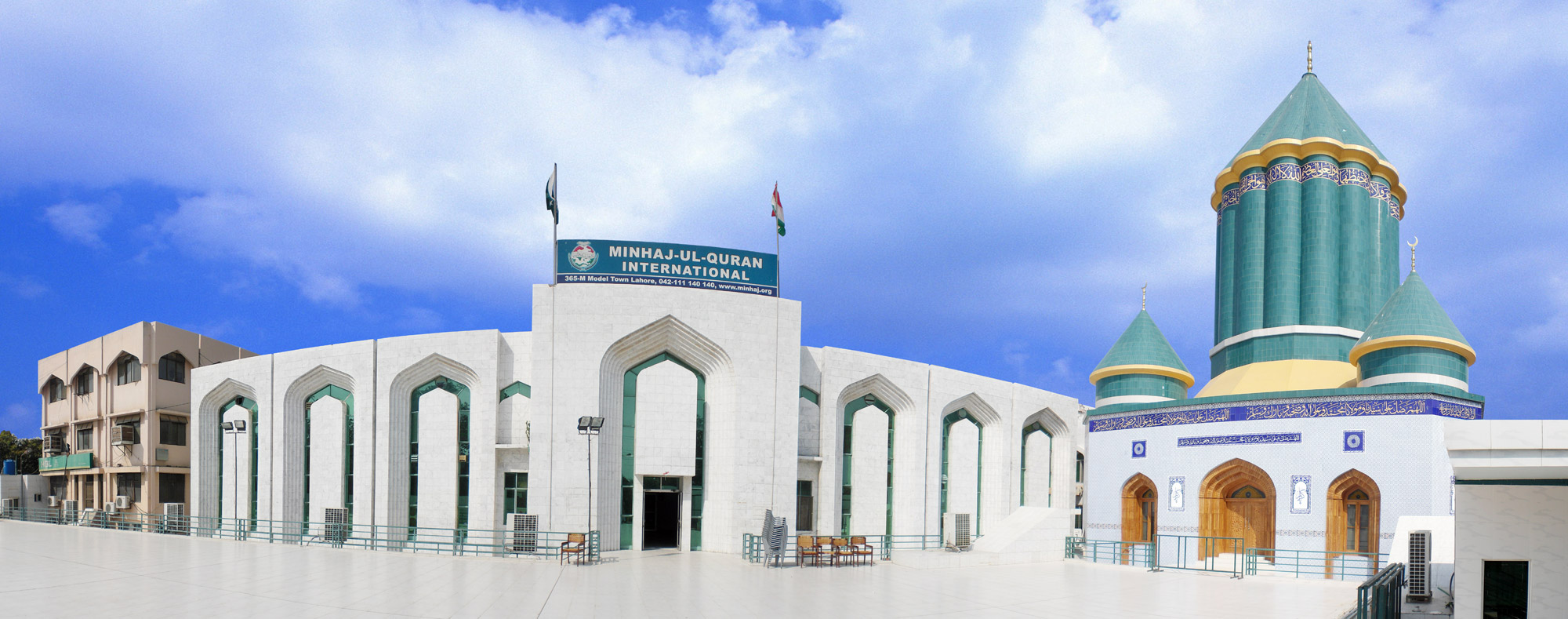
- Founded: 1980; 46 years ago
- Founder: Muhammad Tahir-ul-Qadri
- Type: NGO
- Purpose: Religion, Spiritual, Educational, Human Rights, Women Empowerment, Activism
- Location: Lahore, Punjab, Pakistan
- Method: Education, Training
- Website: www.minhaj.org

Minhaj-ul-Quran International (MQI) (Urdu: منہاج القرآن انٹرنیشنل) is a global non-governmental organization (NGO) founded by Muhammad Tahir-ul-Qadri in 1980 in Lahore, Pakistan. With its headquarters located in Lahore, MQI has expanded its operations to over 100 countries, including the United Kingdom, France, Germany, the United States, Canada, and Australia.

== International network ==
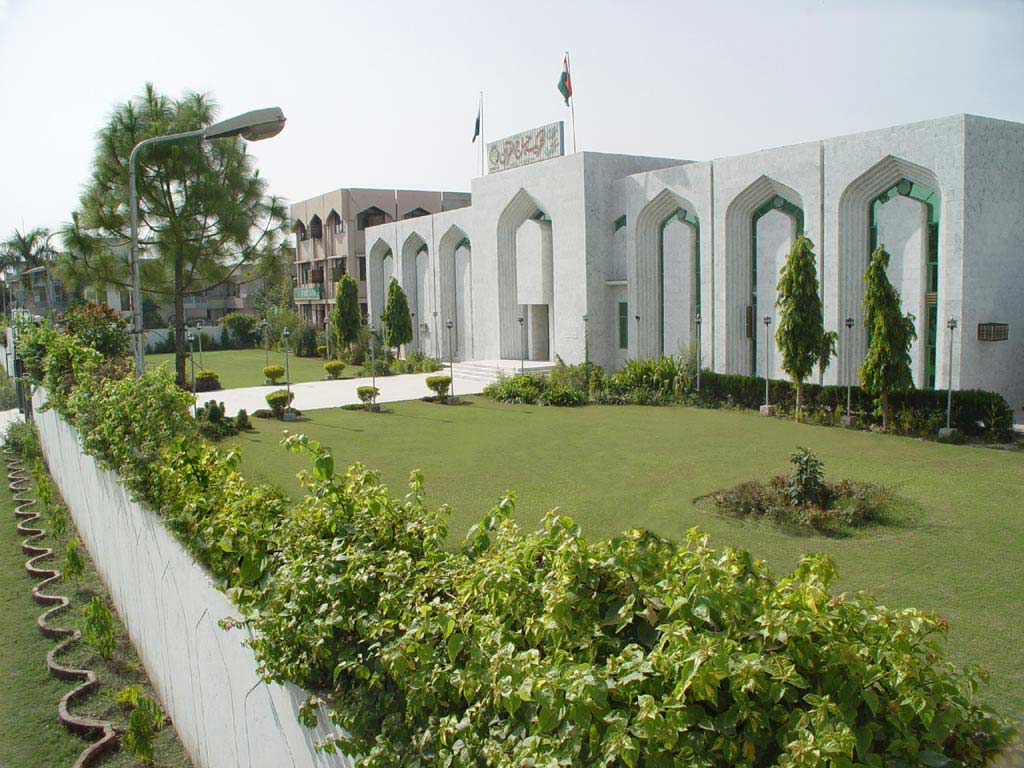
Minhaj-ul-Quran International Headquarters, Pakistan

=== Minhaj-ul-Quran Pakistan ===
MQI organised the Annual Milad Conference which was held at Iqbal Park, Minar-e-Pakistan, Lahore. The chief guest was Al-Azhar University Vice Chancellor Dr Osama Muhammad Al-Abd at the conference while hundreds of thousands of people from all four provinces and delegations from Middle East and parts of Europe attended the conference. It observed one-minute silence against blasphemous caricatures published by France.

It arranged the World Islamic Banking and Finance Conference to find solutions to banking, finance and sociopolitical issues faced by Muslims. In 2019, it launched the "interest free" Al-Muwakhat Islamic Micro-Finance project.

Female activists of the organisation observed the International Women's Day at a rally in Islamabad. It protested in Lahore against Honour Killings of women.

The Model Town Massacre took place outside the premises of MQI Secretariat in Model Town, Lahore on 17 June 2014. The Court directed the police to register a First Information Report (FIR) against the Prime Minister, Punjab Chief Minister, Deputy Inspector of the Police and 18 others which included police officials and politicians.

=== Minhaj-ul-Quran UK ===
Minhaj-ul-Quran UK organised a three-day anti-terrorism camp at Warwick University to tackle extremist ideology with expected attendance of over 1,000 young Muslims. Al Hidayah (organisation) is a part of Minhaj-ul-Quran.

It held a Peace Conference to condemn terrorism in which 12,000 people gathered in Wembley Arena, London. The conference had messages of support from Prime Minister David Cameron, Deputy PM Nick Clegg, opposition leader Ed Miliband, UN Secretary-General Ban Ki-moon, and Archbishop of Canterbury Rowan Williams. There were peace prayers from people of different religions. MQI UK published the Islamic Curriculum on Peace and Counter-Terrorism and Fatwa on Terrorism.

Minhaj-ul-Quran runs a radio station from its mosque in Forest Gate London, it operates Minhaj Welfare Foundation from the mosque and organised a candle lit vigil for people who died in all sorts of terrible ways.

Youngsters from Wimbledon Chedar and MQI Mosque teamed up in their Jewish-Muslim interfaith initiative to make a Challah for homeless people and conduct a workshop.

Al-Hidayah 2023 was a three-day training workshop organized by Minhaj-ul-Quran International (MQI) at Warwick University, UK, from March 8 to 10, 2024. The workshop was attended by more than a thousand Muslim families from the UK and Europe and featured a keynote address by Shaykh-ul-Islam Dr. Muhammad Tahir-ul-Qadri, the founder of MQI. Dr. Qadri spoke on the topics of peace, dialogue, and Islamic teachings and announced his translation of the Quran and the launch of the Minhaj Encyclopedia search engine.

=== Minhaj-ul-Quran Denmark ===
The Danish branch of the Minhaj-ul-Quran International organization was founded in 1987. It consists of four departments, in which three are located in the Copenhagen area and one in Odense.

In 2003 about 130 Danish Pakistanis canceled their memberships in Minhaj-ul-Quran in a mass protest against what they described as a closed and undemocratic organization run as a one-man-show by Muhammad Tahir ul-Qadri.

=== Minhaj-ul-Quran Norway ===
Having established in Copenhagen during the late 1980s, Tahir-ul-Qadri's cassettes and videotapes started spreading throughout much of the Pakistani diaspora community in Norway. In 1990 the Norwegian branch of the Minhaj-ul-Quran International organization was founded in Oslo in 1990. It was started out by 20-30 people renting two small rooms in Tøyengata at Tøyen in central Oslo. Its number of memberships quickly increased. In February 1999 a department of Minhaj-ul-Quran was founded in Stavanger. In 2006 the Oslo department had close to 4000 members, and was the third largest mosque in Oslo after Central Jamaat-e Ahl-e Sunnat and World Islamic Mission. Drammen Moské, founded in 1987, was affiliated with Minhaj-ul-Quran for some time, but chose to cut their ties.

MQI has various community related projects which are supported by the Norwegian Government. One of the main projects is the Minhaj Conflict Resolution or Minhaj Konfliktråd (MKR).

Minhaj-ul-Quran differs from other mosques in Oslo by openly endorsing the Pakistani political party Pakistan Awami Tehreek, while other mosques either do not participate in similar political activities or claim not be involved in politics. Their engagement in this specific political party is due to both organizations sharing the same founder in Muhammad Tahir-ul-Qadri.

When Tahir-ul-Qadri backed Ayatollah Khomeini's fatwa of 1989 demanding the execution of Salman Rushdie for writing a book perceived as blasphemous towards Islam, he received support from the leader of the Norwegian branch of Minhaj-ul-Quran, who also criticized the Norwegian authorities for even communicating with Rushdie.

In 2000 the Oslo department deposed its imam Syed Ikram Jillani on the grounds that the board asserted his teachings were contrary to that of Tahir ul-Qadris. Leader of Minhaj Ungdom, Faiz Alam, justified the dismissal by pointing out that the congregation is following the philosophy of its religious head Tahir ul-Qadri in Pakistan, using his books and videos, and cannot accept that an imam runs a different scheme. Syed Ikram Jillani was later hired as an imam at World Islamic Mission.

Making use of undercover journalism newspaper Dagens Næringsliv in October 2004 revealed how Minhaj-ul-Quran in Oslo will assist Pakistani Norwegian parents looking to send their children off to Quranic schools in Pakistan in order to rid them of what they perceive to be excessive influence from the modern Western environment they live in. The president of Minhaj-ul-Quran Oslo, who otherwise speaks the importance of integration and active participation in Norwegian society, showed willing to provide a place among a selection of Quranic schools he recommended. Confronted a few days later, he denied the statements he had made, until he was informed the conversation had been recorded.

Minhaj-ul-Quran took part in distributing 10,000 copies of the Quran in Norway in response to an incident where anti-Islam group SIAN attempted to burn a copy of the Quran during a demonstration held in Kristiansand in November 2019.

=== Minhaj-ul-Quran India ===
MQI India organised a tour by its Pakistani-Canadian founder Dr. Tahir-ul-Qadri who visited India upon the request of Indian Muslims. The schedule of his visit was from 25 February to 17 March 2012. He addresses a historical gathering of Minhaj-ul-Quran International in Ajmer Sharif India. He attended the World Sufi Forum. The Indian government red flagged his comments that "Kashmiris should be able to choose freedom through a plebiscite" and blocked his visa for his planned visit in 2020.

=== Minhaj-ul-Quran USA ===
The MQI mosque in New Jersey is part of the Eid Committee which ensures that Muslims in different parts of the country can pray together at the same time.

=== Minhaj-ul-Quran Australia ===
The NSW Australian Parliament passed a motion in which Minhaj-ul-Quran Australia was congratulated on their services to the Australian Muslim Community.

== Achievements ==
Minhaj-ul-Quran holds one of the largest annual Itikaf gatherings during the month of Ramadan with approximately 37,000 people sitting congregational Itikaf in 2007. It holds the largest Laylat ul Qadr night event on the 27th Ramadan with millions of attendees.

On 3 December 2005 Minhaj-ul-Quran established a full-time institution called Gosha-e-Durood where any individual can apply to sit for reciting salutations on Muhammad. A building dedicated to this purpose with Mawlana Rumi style minarets is under construction.

As of February 2021 Minhaj-ul-Quran has submitted over 4.51 (4510000000000) Trillion salutation(Durood) on Muhammed.

Minhaj-ul-Quran International is the first organisation of its kind that has initiated interfaith dialogues with religious minorities in Pakistan. Its founder is the Chairman of the 'Muslim Christian Dialogue Forum' to highlight and promote their citizen rights.

The United Nations Economic and Social Council (ECOSOC) has formally recognised and granted a 'Special Consultative Status' to Minhaj-ul-Quran International for its work.

In September 2011, Minhaj-ul-Quran organised a major "Peace for Humanity" conference at Wembley Arena in London at which, under the auspices of Tahir-ul-Qadri, its 12,000 attendees announced a global declaration denouncing racism, interfaith intolerance, extremism and terrorism. Minhaj-ul-Quran strategist Joel Hayward wrote the declaration text for Qadri and was its second formal signatory after Qadri himself. Notably, senior Al-Azhar University leaders and dignitaries then signed it before Minhaj-ul-Quran opened it up via the internet for public signing. They aim to get one million signatures within a year. The London Declaration for Global Peace and Resistance against Extremism is intended as an interfaith document which unequivocally condemns all extremism and terrorism, "because at the heart of all religions is a belief in the sanctity of the lives of the innocent". The Declaration adds: "The indiscriminate nature of terrorism, which has in recent years killed far more civilians and other non-combatants than it has combatants, is un-Islamic, un-Judaic, un-Christian and it is indeed incompatible with the true teachings of all faiths". The London Declaration also "unequivocally condemn[s] anti-Semitism (including when sometimes it is disingenuously clothed as anti-Zionism), Islamophobia (including when it is sometimes disingenuously dressed up as patriotism) and all other forms of racism and xenophobia". Some extremists have already tried to prevent the success of the Declaration via cyber-attacks on the website hosting it.

Tahir-ul Qadri announced the largest March in modern times in Pakistan; a march to take place on 14 January 2013 at 'Tahrir Square' Islamabad. The agenda of long march is to voice elimination of feudalism, introduction of real democracy, rule of law and implementation of constitution.

The Government of Pakistan gave Minhaj-ul-Quran the status of an examination board for religious seminaries under the name of Nizam al-Madaris. A new syllabus was unveiled that would meet the modern day requirements.

== Forums and sub-organisations ==
- The Minhaj University
- Minhaj Welfare Foundation (MWF)
- Al Hidayah
