= Dawat-e-Islami =

Islamic organisation based in Pakistan

Dawat-e-Islami دعوتِ اسلامی

Total population
- 30 million to 900 million

Founder
- Ilyas Qadri

Religions
- Islam

Scriptures
- Quran; Hadith; Sunnat

Languages
- Liturgical: Arabic; In India and Pakistan: Urdu; In Bangladesh: Bengali; In the diaspora: In the UK: Respective regional languages

Website
- www.dawateislami.net

Dawat-e-Islami (Urdu: دعوتِ اسلامی) is an organization based in Pakistan. It has several Islamic educational institutions around the world.

In addition to local charity efforts, Dawat-e-Islami offers online courses in Islamic studies and runs a television station, Madani Channel. Dawat-e-Islami was officially founded in Karachi in September 1981 by leading scholars who selected Ilyas as its main leader.

== History ==
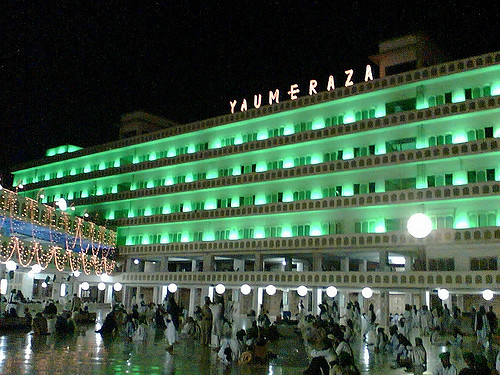
Faizan-e-Madinah in Karachi

Arshadul Qaudri and Islamic scholar Shah Ahmad Noorani, since 1973 head of the Jamiat Ulema-e-Pakistan (JUP), along with other Pakistani Sunni scholars, selected Ilyas Qadri, who was the then Punjab president of Anjuman Talaba-e-Islam, JUP's youth wing, aged 23, as the head of Dawat-e-Islami at Dār-ul ´Ulūm Amjadia. Dawat-e-Islami was established initially to dilute the influence of many Wahhabi groups and their teachings. On 2 September 1981, Dawat-e-Islami came into being.

== Expansion ==
Dawat-e-Islami has spread to more than 194 countries through 26,000+ workers and various volunteers and missionaries who are spreading the message of Islam in their areas. The two most significant activities of Dawat-e-Islami are Madani Qafila (missionary travel) and Naik Amal (self-assessment questionnaires). Followers travel for specific days to spread the message of Islam to the people. Dawat-e-Islami owns its own TV Channel known as Madani Channel. It also arranges an annual gathering of Muslims in Multan.

In October 2002, a major Pakistani English-language newspaper reported on a three-day public gathering in the city of Multan, Pakistan, which was held by the Dawat-e-Islami organization and was attended by thousands of people from all parts of Pakistan and other countries. Pakistan Railways had used special trains from Karachi, Hyderabad and Nawabshah to take passengers to Multan. Ilyas Qadri spoke at the first and last sessions of the gathering.

In addition to mosques, Dawat-e-Islami has also started Dar-ul-Madinah, an Islamic school system that aims to improve conventional academic studies in conformity with Sharia.

=== Europe ===
Dawat-e-Islami expanded to the United Kingdom in 1995, holding its first Ijtima (weekly congregation) in Halifax. As of December 2019, it now has at least 38 properties in the United Kingdom which are used as a network of Masajid, Islamic centers, schools and/or Jamias in order to create future scholars for society. Some buildings have been completed and others are being worked on. More than 100,000 British Muslims are associated in some form with Dawat-e-Islami in the UK. In 2009, a madrassa was opened in Rotherham, England, for the education of young children and adults.

Dawat-e-Islami operates twelve centers in Greece and seven in Spain. In Athens, it has an association with local Sufis and has established four centers.

== Annual Islamic gatherings ==
Dawat-e-Islami organized an annual congregation in Multan, Pakistan until 2008, when it was discontinued for security reasons, and in Birmingham. In 2002, around 500,000 people participated in its congregation in Multan, Pakistan.

Dawat-e-Islami planned to hold an annual congregation (Ijtema) in December 1991 in Mumbai (India). Ilyas Attar Qadri tried to cancel it, but local activists held it anyway. A dispute about this caused the Mumbai-based group to break away as Sunni Dawate Islami.

== Madrasa-tul Madina (Basic Education System) ==
In Madrasa tul Madina, children are taught how to read the Qur’an in Arabic, as well as foundational Islamic studies. Currently, Madrasa tul Madina has around 3790 branches, with approximately 169,000 boys and girls studying free of charge in these institutions.

== Madani Channel ==
Since 2008, Dawat-e-Islami has been operating its Madani Channel, which had been launched with Urdu broadcasts but afterwards three more channels in English, Arabic and Bengali were launched. Madani Channel is free of commercial advertisements and it runs on charity and broadcasts programs to spread the true teachings of Islam and to reform the society through spiritual and moral guidance.

The channel is operated by Faizan Productions and is broadcast by satellite to viewers in many countries, including across Asia, the Middle East and Australasia.

=== Live streaming ===
Madani Channel also streams live in multiple languages, namely Urdu, English and Bangla, on YouTube.

=== Kids Madani Channel ===
Dawat-e-Islami also runs Kids Madani Channel, a children's channel on YouTube. Its description says it carries programs, cartoons, animated stories and poems about Islam for children.

=== Cartoon series ===
Dawat-e-Islami has produced animated cartoon series, including:

- Ghulam Rasool
- Kaneez Fatima
- Hamza Cartoon Series
- Hamza AI Cartoon

== COVID-19 ==
During the COVID-19 pandemic in Pakistan, Dawat-e-Islami distributed food ration bags to needy people affected by lockdown in Pakistan. On 20 April 2020, Imran Attari said that Dawat-e-Islami had distributed 250,000 ration bags across Pakistan, including 40,000 in Karachi. The organisation had also set up blood donation centres in 13 places in Karachi. It collected 18,000 bottles from 106 campuses across the country.

== Green Pakistan ==
Dawat-e-Islami started a campaign for planting trees across Pakistan, which aims to make the country pollution-free. Sindh Governor Imran Ismail inaugurated a monsoon tree plantation drive at the Governor's House as part of the Clean Green Pakistan Initiative in collaboration with Dawat-e-Islami Pakistan in August 2021. The Green Pakistan plantation campaign covers all major cities of Pakistan and costs millions of Pakistani rupees.

== Madani Home ==
Faizan Global Relief Foundation (FGRF), a welfare division of Dawat-e-Islami, a non-profit organization, is building a shelter home for homeless children under its project ‘Madani Home’.

== See also ==
- Jamia-tul-Madina
- Faizan-e-Sunnat
- Muhammad Ilyas Qadri

== Notes ==
- Attar Qadri, Ilyas (1991). Dawat-e-Islami ka Maqsad : Mujay Apni Aur Sari Dunya Kay Logo Ki Islah Ki Koshish Karni Hay ان شاء اللہ عزوجل. Maktaba Ahle Sunnah Karachi.
- Gugler, Thomas K. (2011). Mission Medina: Da'wat-e Islami und Tabligi Gama'at. Würzburg: Ergon.
