= Fatwa on Terrorism =

2011 book by Muhammad Tahir-ul-Qadri

Fatwa on Terrorism and Suicide Bombings
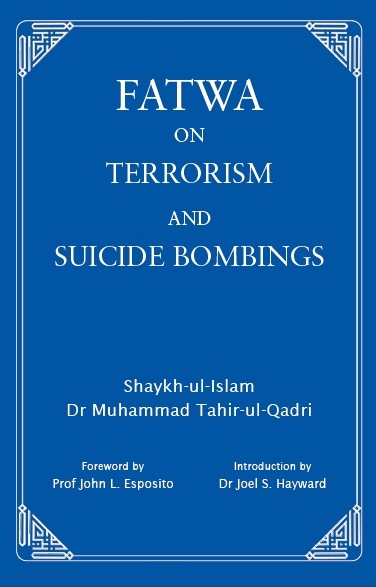
- First edition cover
- Author: Muhammad Tahir-ul-Qadri, John Esposito (Foreword), Joel Hayward (Introduction)
- Language: English and Urdu
- Subject: Islam
- Publisher: Minhaj-ul-Quran Publications
- Publication date: 31 January 2011
- Publication place: United Kingdom
- Media type: Print (hardcover)
- Pages: 512
- ISBN: 978-0-9551888-9-3

The Fatwa on Terrorism and Suicide Bombings is a 600-page (Urdu version), 512 page (English version) Islamic book by scholar Muhammad Tahir-ul-Qadri which demonstrates from the Quran and Sunnah that terrorism and suicide bombings are unjust and evil, and thus un-Islamic and haram. The book was published in London. The English edition was published in the UK by Minhaj-ul-Quran Publications. Qadri released the book on 2 March 2010.

This fatwa is a direct refutation of the ideology of Al-Qaeda and the Taliban. It is one of the most extensive Islamic anti-terrorism rulings, an "absolute" condemnation of terrorism without "any excuses or pretexts" which goes further than ever and declares that terrorism is kufr under Islamic law. The launch was organised by Minhaj-ul-Quran UK. Qadri said during the launch that "Terrorism is terrorism, violence is violence and it has no place in Islamic teaching and no justification can be provided for it, or any kind of excuses or ifs or buts."

Qadri at a news conference in London explaining the Fatwa on Terrorism

== Overview ==
The fatwa received widespread media attention and was positively covered by the international press.

According to CNN, some experts see the fatwa as a significant blow to terrorist recruiting. CNN's Amanpour show added the fatwa summary to its website and declared it to be fatwa for peace, while the US State Department declares the fatwa to be significant step in taking Islam back from terrorists.

Before it had been released, Douglas Murray described the Fatwa on Terrorism, in an article in the Evening Standard, as "potentially important", although he said "A single fatwa will not change the level of denial and self-criticism inherent in so much of modern Islam".

ITV news channel questioned the credibility of the fatwa and asks if it was not by the British government because senior counter-terrorism officials from Scotland Yard and MI5 were present at the launch.

The 512-page English book version of the fatwa, Fatwa on Terrorism and Suicide Bombings, (London: Minhaj-ul-Quran, 2011. ISBN 978-0-9551888-9-3) has a foreword by John Esposito and an introduction by Joel Hayward, both of whom share Qadri's scholarly assessment that, regardless of any intention, the evil of terrorism remains evil and must be exposed, opposed and condemned.

The Fatwa on Terrorism has been officially endorsed by Al-Azhar University in Cairo, Egypt. In January 2011, the fatwa was discussed at the World Economic Forum Annual Meeting 2011. In June 2011, Pope Benedict XVI received a copy of the fatwa from representatives of Minhaj Interfaith Relations. The Pope reportedly appreciated that it promoted peace, harmony and interfaith dialogue.

The Fatwa on Terrorism was reviewed positively by Kemal Argon who published a review in The Journal of Rotterdam Islamic and Social Sciences, Vol. 2, No. 1, 2011, pp. 149–160. Islamic University of Rotterdam, Netherlands.

== See also ==
- Minhaj-ul-Quran International
- London Declaration for Global Peace and Resistance against Extremism 2011
