= Sit-in =

Form of direct action

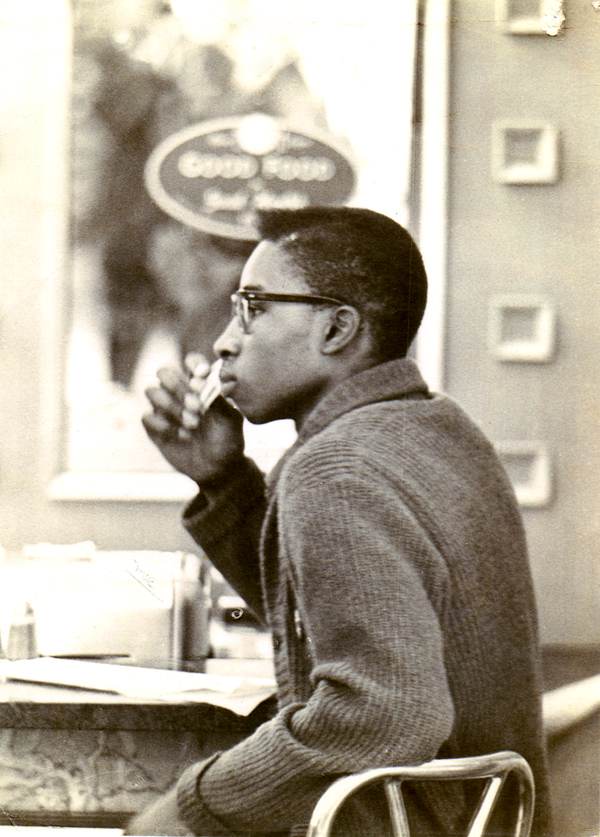
FAMU student Benjamin Cowins during a 1961 sit-in at McCrory's lunch counter in Tallahassee, during Jim Crow

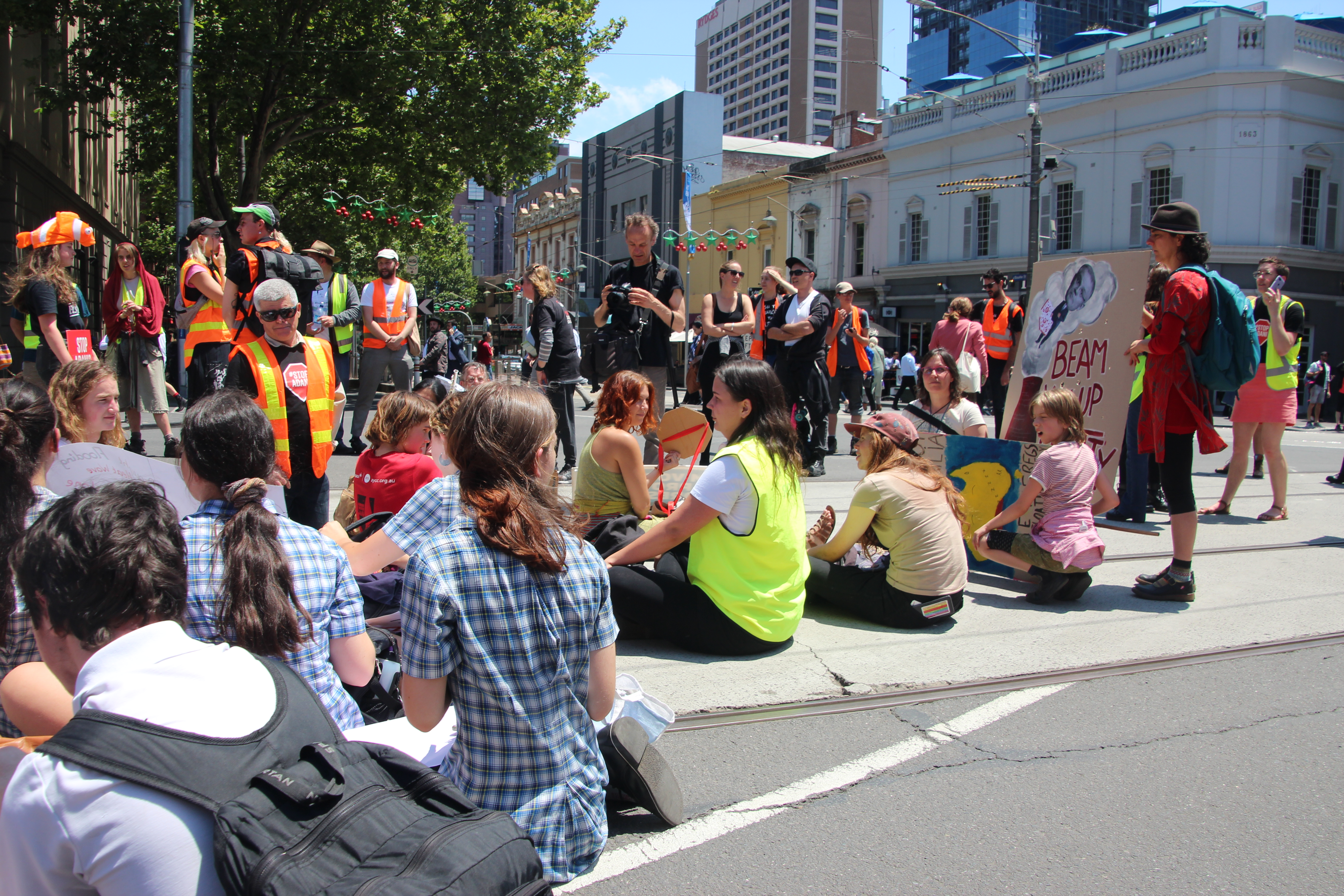
A sit-in for climate action in Melbourne, Australia

A sit-in or sit-down is a form of direct action that involves one or more people occupying an area for a protest, often to promote political, social, or economic change. The protestors gather conspicuously in a space or building, refusing to move unless their demands are met. The often clearly visible demonstrations are intended to spread awareness among the public, or disrupt the goings-on of the protested organization. Lunch counter sit-ins were a nonviolent form of protest used to oppose segregation during the 1954–1968 civil rights movement in the United States, and often provoked heckling and violence from those opposed to their message.

== Tactics ==
The tactics of a sit-in is usually to cause peaceful disruption. The strategy for sit in protests was pioneered by Mahatma Gandhi, during the Quit India Movement and Salt March, which involved peaceful resistance. Gandhi drew from the works of Leo Tolstoy. Although throughout history sit-ins existed as a form of protest, including prior to the Industrial Revolution. Sit ins cause the message of a protest movement to be spread, without causing any damage, as such they are a common form of civil disobedience.

== Examples ==
=== United States ===
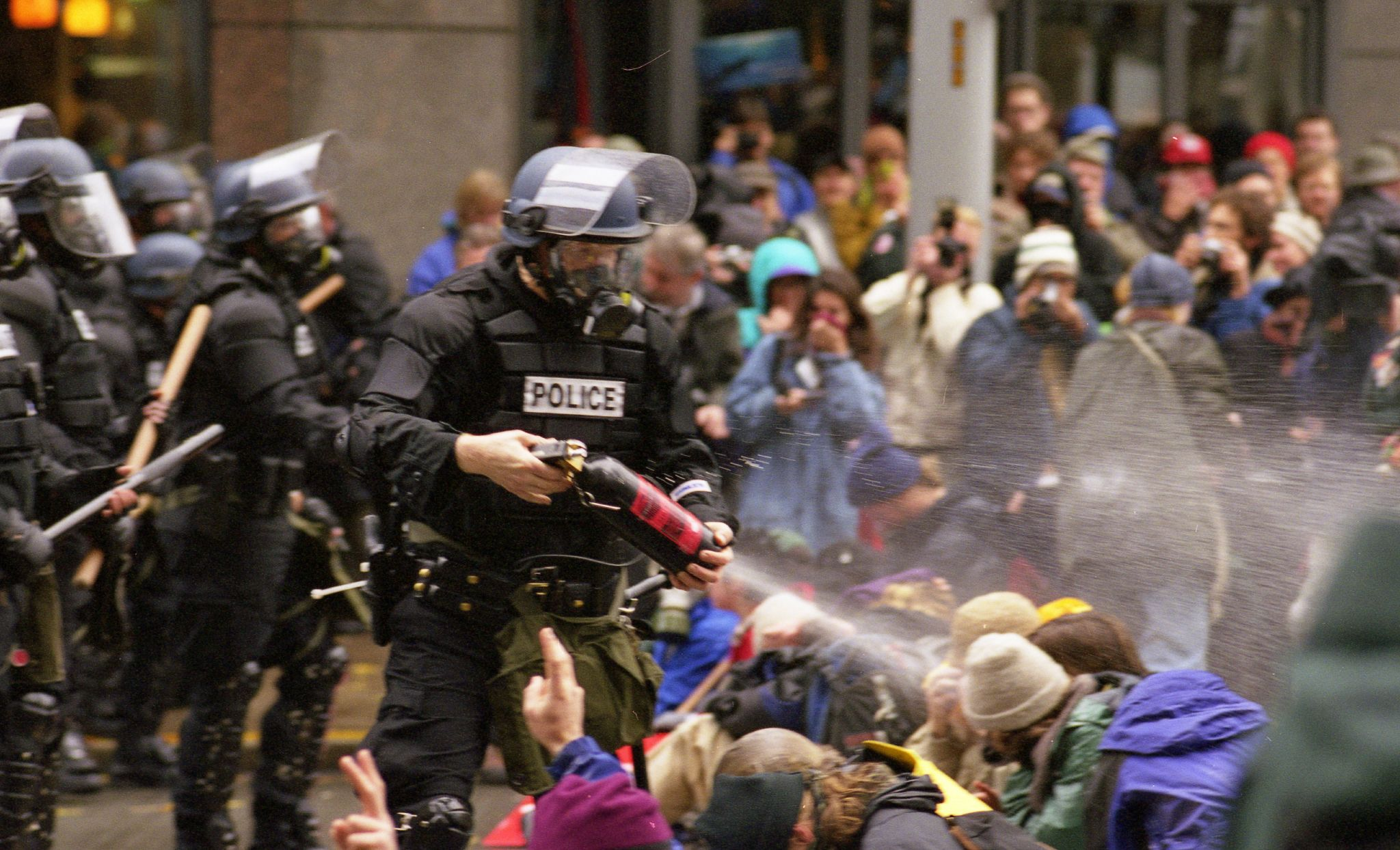
Sit in protesters pepper sprayed during the 1999 Seattle WTO protests

==== Civil rights movement ====
The Fellowship of Reconciliation (FOR) and the Congress of Racial Equality (CORE) conducted sit-ins as early as the 1940s. Ernest Calloway refers to Bernice Fisher as "Godmother of the restaurant 'sit-in' technique." In August 1939, African-American attorney Samuel Wilbert Tucker organized the Alexandria Library sit-in at the then racially segregated library. Congress of Industrial Organizations (CIO) labor delegates had a brief, spontaneous lunch counter sit-in during their 1947 Columbus, Ohio convention.

In one of the earliest use of sit-ins against racism, followers of Father Divine and the International Peace Mission Movement joined with the Cafeteria Workers Union, Local 302, in September 1939 to protest racially unfair hiring practices at New York's Shack Sandwich Shops, Inc. According to The New York Times for September 23, 1939, on Thursday between 75 and 100 followers showed up at the restaurant at Forty-first Street and Lexington Avenue, where most of the strike activity has been concentrated, and groups went into the place, purchased five-cent cups of coffee, and conducted what might be described as a kind of customers' nickel sit down strike. Other patrons were unable to find seats.

In May 1942, James Farmer Jr., an organizer for the Fellowship of Reconciliation, led a group of 27 people to protest the racially discriminatory no-service policy of the Jack Spratt Diner on 47th Street in Chicago. Each seating area at the diner was taken by groups that included at least one black person. The peaceful patrons, several from the campus of the nearby University of Chicago, then tried to order; all were refused. The police were called, but when they arrived they told the management that no laws were being broken, so no arrests were made. The diner closed for the night but thereafter, according to periodic checks made by CORE activists, it no longer enforced its discriminatory policy.

With the encouragement of Melvin B. Tolson and Farmer, students from Wiley and Bishop Colleges organized the first sit-in in Texas in the rotunda of the Harrison County Courthouse in Marshall. This sit-in directly challenged the oldest White Citizens Party in Texas and would culminate in the reversal of Jim Crow laws in the state and the desegregation of postgraduate studies in Texas by the Sweatt v. Painter (1950) verdict. Sit-ins are often recognized for illuminating the goals of the movement in a way that young people were also able to participate in. Sit-ins were an integral part of the nonviolent strategy of civil disobedience and mass protests that eventually led to passage of the Civil Rights Act of 1964 which ended legally sanctioned racial segregation in the United States and also passage of the Voting Rights Act of 1965 that struck down many racially motivated barriers used to deny voting rights to non-whites.

==== 1955 Baltimore, Maryland ====
One of the earliest lunch counter sit-ins of the Civil Rights Movement was started by a group of Morgan State College (now University) students and the Baltimore chapter of CORE. Their goal was to desegregate Read's drug stores. The peaceful impromptu sit-in lasted less than one half an hour and the students were not served. They left voluntarily and no one was arrested. After losing business from the sit-in and several local protests, two days later the Baltimore Afro-American newspaper ran a story featuring Arthur Nattans Sr., then President of Read's, who was quoted saying, "We will serve all customers throughout our entire stores, including the fountains, and this becomes effective immediately". As a result, 37 Baltimore-area lunch counters became desegregated. Despite also being led by students and successfully targeting segregation at a store lunch counter, the Read's Drug Store sit-in did not garner the same level of attention as the 1960 Greensboro sit-ins.

==== 1957 Durham, North Carolina ====
At another early sit-in, the "Royal Seven," a group of three women and four men from Durham, North Carolina, sat in at the Royal Ice Cream Parlor on June 23, 1957, to protest practices of segregation. The activists were arrested and charged with trespassing. Their efforts are now recognized via historical markers in Durham. They went to court three times; each case ended in their being found guilty.

==== 1958 Wichita and Oklahoma City ====
This sit-in for the purpose of integrating segregated establishments began on July 19, 1958, in Wichita, Kansas, at Dockum Drugs, a store in the old Rexall chain. In early August, the drugstore became integrated, then remainder of Dockum stores in all of Kansas. A few weeks later on August 19, 1958, in Oklahoma City, a nationally recognized sit-in at the Katz Drug Store lunch counter occurred. The Oklahoma City Sit-in Movement was led by NAACP Youth Council leader Clara Luper, a local high school teacher, and young local students, including Luper's eight-year-old daughter, who suggested the sit-in be held. The group quickly desegregated the Katz Drug Store lunch counters. It took several more years, but she and the students, using the tactic, integrated all of Oklahoma City's eating establishments. Today, in downtown Wichita, Kansas, a statue depicting a waitress at a counter serving people honors this pioneering sit-in. Despite the notable attention that has historically been given to the 1960 Greensboro sit-in, the 1958 Katz Drug Store sit-in in fact employed the same strategy that would be used in Greensboro one-and-a-half years later.

==== 1960 Greensboro and Nashville ====
Following the Oklahoma City sit-ins, the tactic of non-violent student sit-ins spread. The Greensboro sit-ins at a Woolworth's in Greensboro, North Carolina, on February 1, 1960, launched a wave of anti-segregation sit-ins across the South and opened a national awareness of the depth of segregation in the nation. Within weeks, sit-in campaigns had begun in nearly a dozen cities, primarily targeting Woolworth's and S. H. Kress and other stores of other national chains.

The largest and best-organized of these campaigns were the Nashville sit-ins, whose groundwork was already underway before the Greensboro events. They involved hundreds of participants, and led to the successful desegregation of Nashville lunch counters. Most of the participants in the Nashville sit-ins were college students, and many, such as Diane Nash, James Bevel, Bernard Lafayette, and C. T. Vivian, went on to lead, strategize, and direct almost every aspect of the 1960s civil rights movement. The students of the historically black colleges and universities in the city played a critical role in implementing the Nashville sit-ins.

1963 Flagstaff Arizona

The NAACP recruited 10 high school and middle school students from Flagstaff Junior High School and Flagstaff High School to protest the refusal of the El Charro Cafe to serve a bus load of Negro tourists from New Jersey. Shirley Sims, a 14-year-old member of the NAACP Youth Corp at Flagstaff Junior High School, accepted the invitation to participate in a nonviolent sit-in demonstration. Each of the youth members were given $5 with the instructions to go inside and sit down. If they were able to order a meal they would pay for it, if not they would sit there. Reportedly, none of the members were served. Joseph Watkins, an official of the Arizona Branch of the NAACP, reported to the Flagstaff City Council that none of the youths had been served and that there had been no violence. Watkins also stated that unless the restaurant had a change in policy, more sit ins would be staged, "but whatever methods we employ or encourage will be peaceful." Sims stated in an Arizona Daily Sun article in 2017 that, "it wasn't scary because a lot of the people who frequented that restaurant were our teachers, and they encouraged us."

==== 1961 Rock Hill, South Carolina ====
The Friendship Nine was a group of African American men who went to jail after staging a sit-in at a segregated McCrory's lunch counter in Rock Hill, South Carolina in 1961. The group gained nationwide attention because they followed the Nashville student's strategy of not bailing themselves out of jail and called it "Jail, No Bail", which lessened the huge financial burden civil rights groups were facing as the sit-in movement spread across the South. They became known as the Friendship Nine because eight of the nine men were students at Rock Hill's Friendship Junior College. They are sometimes referred to as the Rock Hill Nine.

==== 1962 University of Chicago, Illinois ====
In January 1962, Bernie Sanders, then a student at the University of Chicago, helped lead a sit-in in protesting university president George Wells Beadle's segregated campus housing policy. "We feel it is an intolerable situation, when Negro and white students of the university cannot live together in university-owned apartments," Sanders told a crowd of about 200 students. After several days of protests, Beadle met with students to form a commission to investigate discrimination.

=== Disability rights movement ===
==== 1935 New York City ====
The League of the Physically Handicapped in New York City was formed in May 1935 to protest discrimination by the Works Progress Administration (WPA). The Home Relief Bureau of New York City stamped applications by physically handicapped applicants with "PH", which stood for "physically handicapped". Marked as "unemployable", they were denied access to WPA-created jobs. To protest, members of the League held a sit-in at that Home Relief Bureau for nine days beginning on May 29, 1935, and a weekend sit-in at the WPA headquarters, also in New York City, in June 1935. These actions eventually led to the creation of 1,500 jobs for physically handicapped workers in New York City in 1936.

==== 1972 New York City ====
An early version of the Rehabilitation Act of 1973 was vetoed by President Richard Nixon in October 1972. Later in 1972, Disabled in Action demonstrated in New York City with a sit-in protesting this veto. Led by Judith Heumann, eighty activists staged this sit-in on Madison Avenue, stopping traffic.

==== 1977 San Francisco ====
Initially Joseph Califano, U.S. Secretary of Health, Education and Welfare, refused to sign meaningful regulations for Section 504 of the Rehabilitation Act of 1973, which was the first U.S. federal civil rights protection for people with disabilities. After an ultimatum and deadline, demonstrations took place in ten U.S. cities on April 5, 1977, including the beginning of the 504 Sit-in at the San Francisco Office of the U.S. Department of Health, Education and Welfare. This sit-in, led by Judith Heumann and organized by Kitty Cone, lasted until May 4, 1977, a total of 25 days, with more than 150 people refusing to leave. It is the longest sit-in at a federal building to date. Joseph Califano signed the regulations on April 28, 1977.

=== Easement payment ===
On June 1, 1955, in Door County, Wisconsin, Mrs. Victor Baker sat on a chair over three charges of dynamite, and later moved to her car parked near the dynamite. She blocked the construction of a state highway for 17 hours to protest the failure of the county government to pay the entirety of the amount owed her and her husband for the additional right-of-way taken from her home and orchard along the construction route. The county had planned to pay a week later, after the state sent the funds. On the morning of June 2, the county highway commissioner came by with a check for an additional $1,500 and she ended the protest.

=== Feminist movement ===
==== 1969 Marlene Dixon ====
In 1969 there was a sit-in at the University of Chicago to protest the firing of feminist sociology professor Marlene Dixon. On February 12, 1969, a faculty committee chaired by Hanna H. Gray, Associate Professor of History, concluded that no violation of normal appointment procedures had occurred, but recommended that Dixon be offered a one-year terminal reappointment since the resolution of her status had been delayed by the controversy surrounding the decision; Dixon refused. On February 15, the protestors still sitting-in voted to stop. In March 1969, at the decision of university disciplinary committees, forty-two students involved in the Administration Building sit-in were expelled, eighty-one were suspended, and three were placed on probation.

A "Statement on the University of Chicago sit-in" was included in the feminist anthology Sisterhood is Powerful: An Anthology of Writings From The Women's Liberation Movement (edited by Robin Morgan, published in 1970); this statement refers to the Marlene Dixon sit-in.

==== 1969 Oak Room sit-in ====
By the early 1950s, women were allowed inside the Oak Room and Bar during the evenings, but still barred until 3 p.m. on weekdays, while the stock exchanges operated. In February 1969, Betty Friedan and other members of the National Organization for Women held a sit-in and then picketed to protest this; the gender restriction was removed a few months later.

==== 1970 Ladies' Home Journal ====
In March 1970, feminists held an 11-hour sit-in at the Ladies' Home Journal's office, which resulted in them getting the opportunity to produce a section of the magazine that August.

=== Gun control lobby ===
==== 2016 United States House of Representatives ====
The sit-in began on June 22, 2016, when members of the House Democratic Caucus declared their intention to remain on the floor of the United States House of Representatives until its Republican Speaker, Paul Ryan, allowed votes on gun safety legislation in the aftermath of the Orlando nightclub shooting.

A group of the Democrats ultimately occupied the floor through the night, only leaving on the afternoon of June 23. None of the measures demanded by the occupying members were given a vote.

=== LGBTQ+ rights movement ===
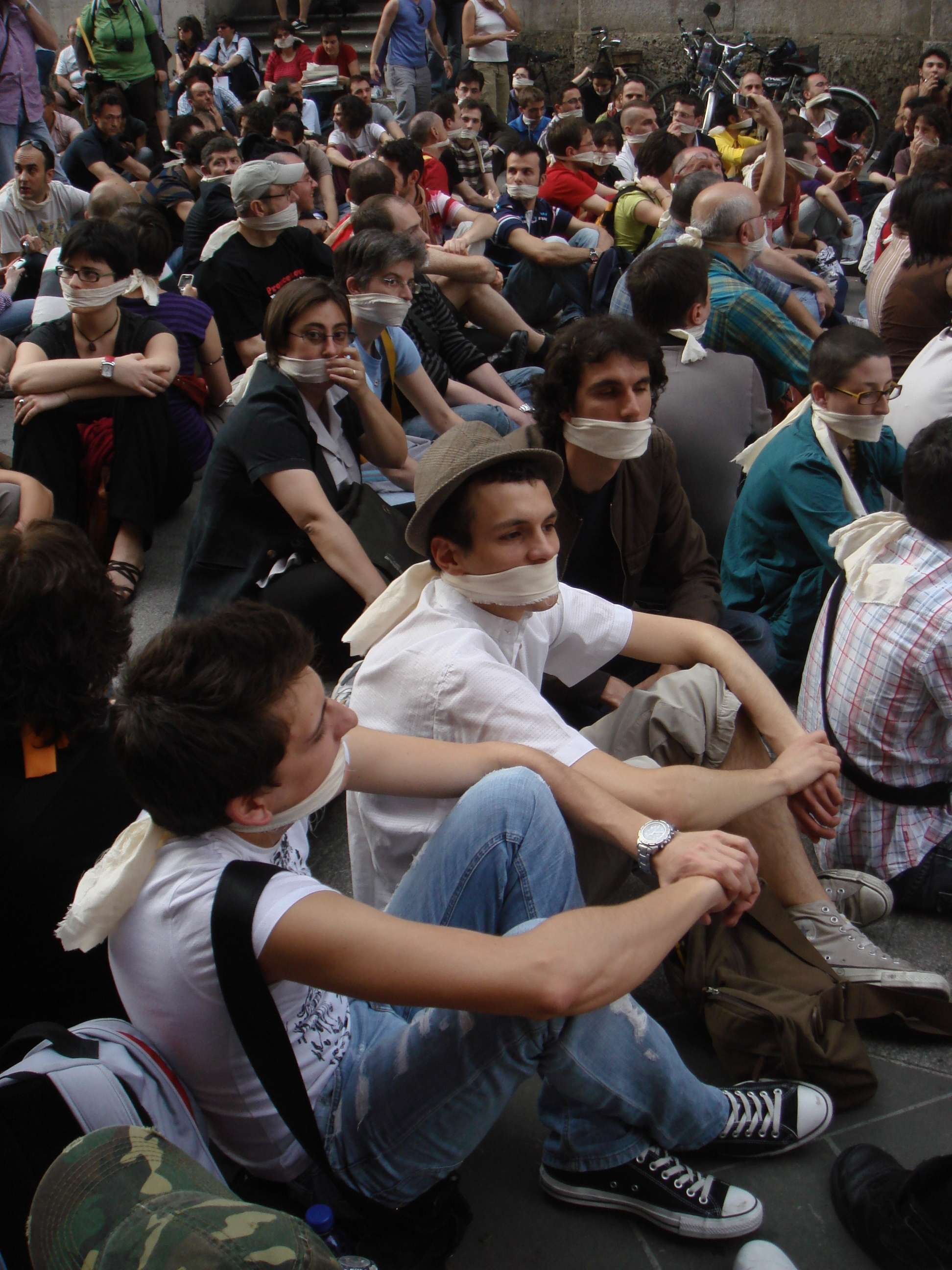
2009 sit-in against homophobia, Milan, Italy

==== 1965 Philadelphia ====
On April 25, 1965, the first of two sit-ins occurred at the popular Dewey's Restaurant in Philadelphia, Pennsylvania. It was one of the earliest demonstrations advocating for the LGBT community in United States history. Three unidentified teenagers and approximately 150 supporters walked into the Dewey's location at 219 South 17th Street, refusing to leave in the name of civil rights. This initial sit-in was in response to Dewey's recently implemented discriminatory policy claiming it would not serve “homosexuals,” “masculine women,” “feminine men,” or “persons wearing nonconformist clothing.” Philadelphia police arrested the three teenagers, which led to further grass-roots action. Clark Polak, president of the local Janus Society, extended support to the protesters. Members of the Janus Society and other supporters circulated approximately 1500 flyers throughout the local area over the next five days.

On May 2, 1965, protesters staged a second sit-in at Dewey's, although this time there were no arrests. Soon after the second sit-in, Dewey's Restaurant reversed their discriminatory policy. The Dewey's sit-ins helped continue the path towards equal rights for many LGBT people in the United States.

==== 1966 New York ====
On April 21, 1966, gay activists of the Mattachine Society of New York (MSNY) conducted a "Sip-In" at Julius' Bar at 10th Street. This established the right of gay people to be served in licensed premises in New York. This action helped clear the way for gay premises with state liquor licenses.

=== Protests against the Israel-Hamas War ===
In April 2024, student activists at Columbia University, with Students for Justice in Palestine and Jewish Voice for Peace began to conduct a sit-in on the university's campus, demanding the university divest from Israel in response to the Gaza war. Columbia's demonstration influenced protests and sit-ins at other universities both in and out of the United States. In response to the demonstrations, the White House spokesman stated, "The president believes that forcibly taking over a building on campus is absolutely the wrong approach. That is not an example of peaceful protests."

=== Anti Islamic Republic Protest ===
After the 2026 Iran massacre, students from 30 universities in all across Iran announced staged sit-ins, including in medical universities, the government had to switch to online classes and exams for the next semesters as well, Minister of Health deputy announced program to alleviate psychological trauma suffered by students.

=== Hungary ===
==== Eco-protest movement ====
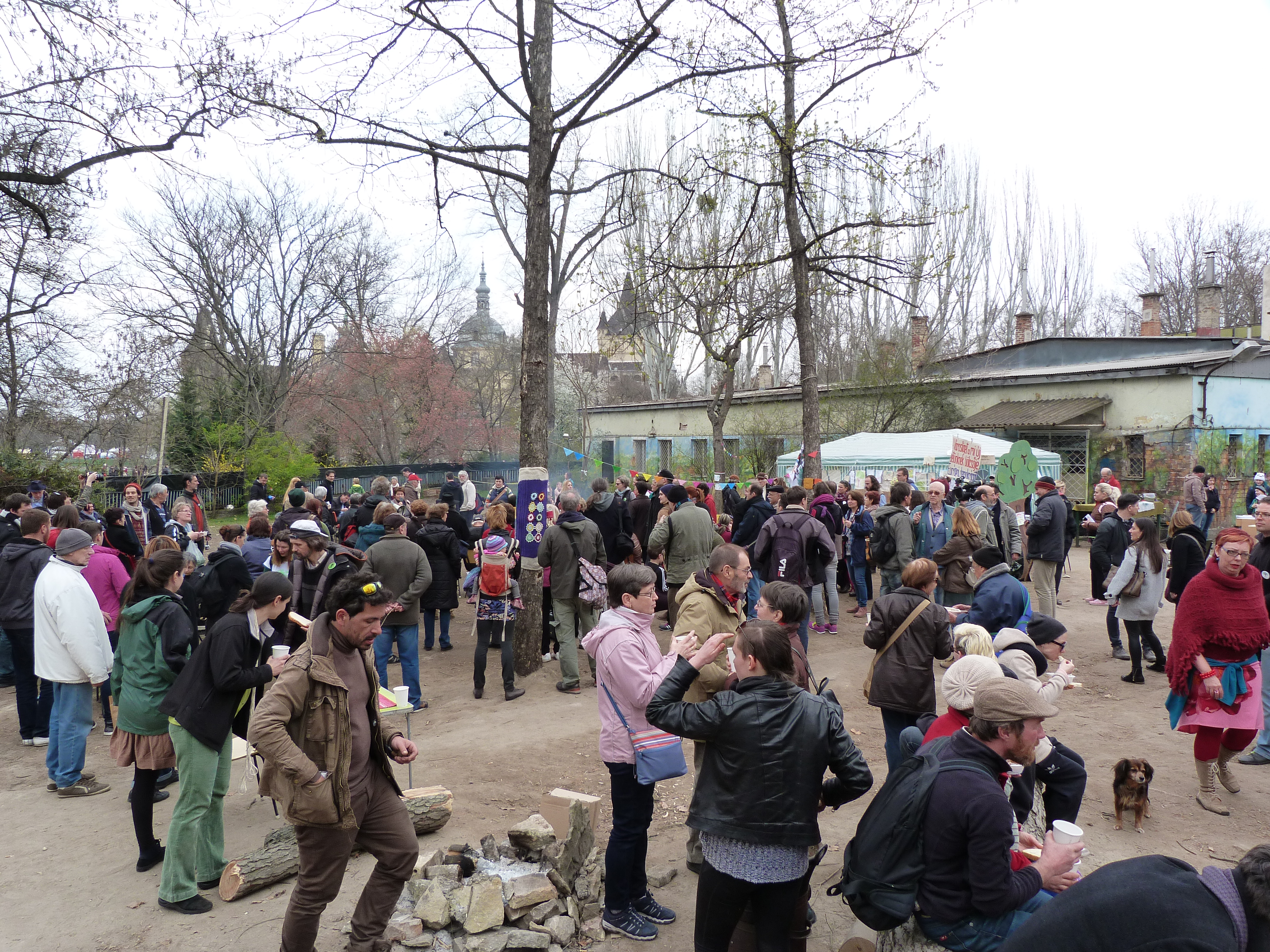
Sit-in, Kertem

In 2016, eco-protesters occupied the area of the Kertem in Budapest in protest against the building plan in Városliget.

=== Pakistan ===
==== 2014 anti-government protest ====
The Azadi March (Freedom March) led by Imran Khan of Pakistan Tehreek-e-Insaf (PTI), and Inqilab March (Revolution March) led by Muhammad Tahir-ul-Qadri of Pakistan Awami Tehrik (PAT) are political, aiming at a probe of election rigging by Nawaz Sharif, as well as restoration of "true democracy and social, political and economical reforms." The Azadi March started on August 14, 2014, and ended on December 17, 2014. It is considered to be the longest-lasting public sit-in in Pakistan's history. Concepcion Picciotto's sit-in was the more long-lasting sit-in, but on an individual level.

=== South Africa ===
During apartheid a number of sit-in protests against the country's policy of racial segregation were staged in South African embassies in the United States. In post-apartheid South Africa two notable sit-ins were the occupation of South African universities to protest high tuition during the FeesMustFall protests and the Greenmarket Square refugee sit-in to protest for the resettlement of refugees to third countries due to xenophobia.

=== Wales ===
The Welsh Language Society's (WLS) first public protest took place in February 1963 in Aberystwyth town centre where members pasted posters on the post office in an attempt to be arrested and go to trial. When it became apparent that they would not be arrested for the posters, the WLS members then moved to Pont Trefechan in Aberystwyth, where around seventy members and supporters held a sit-in blocking road traffic for half an hour.

In 1968, a sit-in was held at the news and television studio and the newsroom department of the BBC at Broadway, Cardiff, by the WLS. The sit-in was calling for the BBC to use more Welsh.

=== Dharna ===
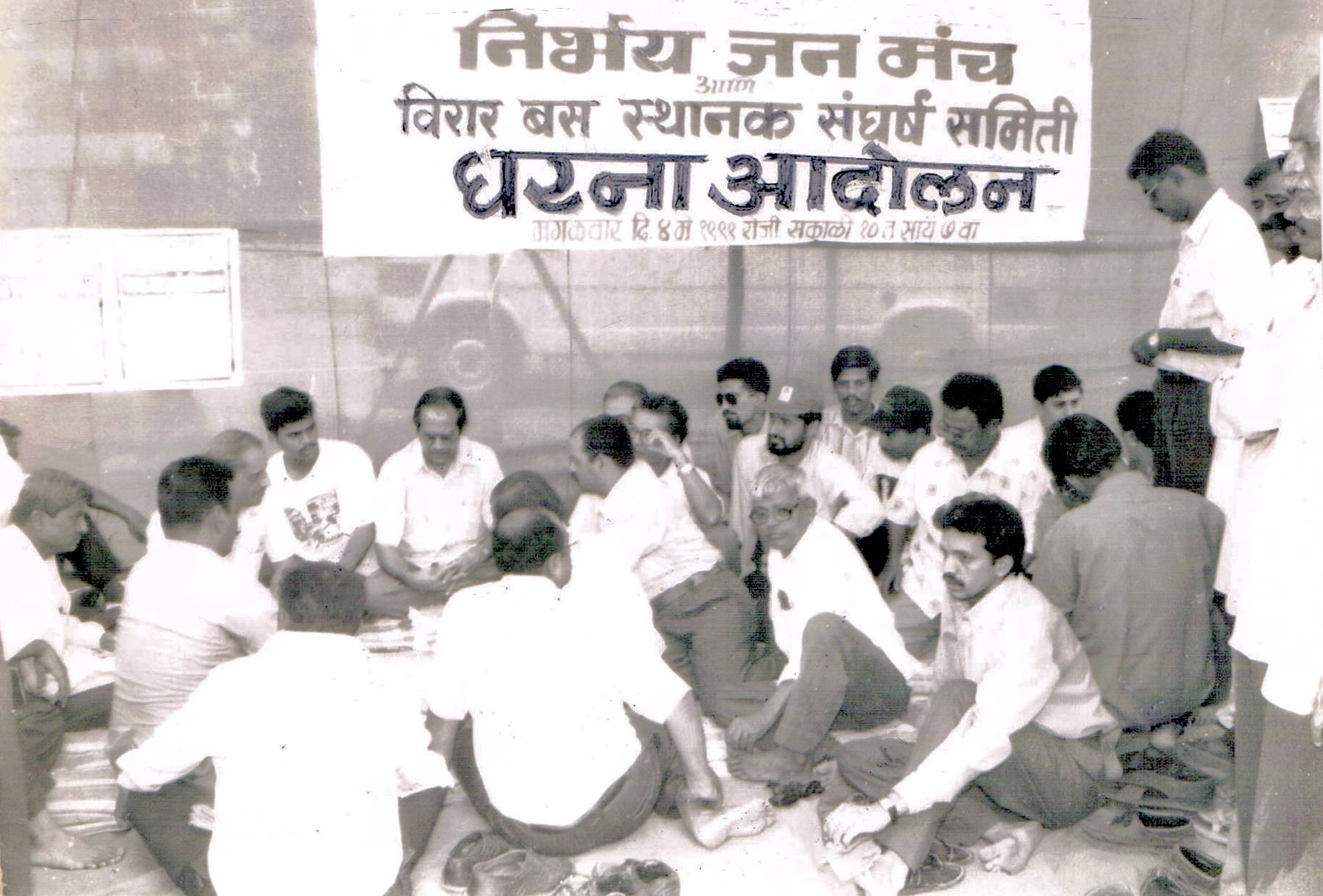
A dharna in Virar, Maharashtra

A dharna (Hindi: धरना; Urdu: دهرنا) is a non-violent sit-in protest, which may include a fast undertaken at the door of an offender, especially a debtor, in India as a means of obtaining compliance with a demand for justice, state response of criminal cases, or payment of a debt. The word originates from the Sanskrit word dharnam.

Dharna generally refers to fixing one's mind on an object. It refers to whole-heartedly pledging toward an outcome or to inculcating a directed attitude. Dharna is consciously and diligently holding a point of view with the intent of achieving a goal.

Historically in India, it was a popular form of protest during the Indian independence movement and part of Mahatma Gandhi's satyagraha form of civil disobedience and protest. There were also recorded instances of indigenous officials charged with recruitment quotas for the British Indian Army staging dharna as a recruitment tool in Punjab during World War I.

More recently, there are designated places for conducting Dharna, and a permission is required for it. Often, those practicing dharna break the permission leading to clashes with law enforcement. For example, the Shaheen Bagh protest was a sit-in peaceful protest, led by women, that began in response to the passage of the Citizenship Amendment Act (CAA) in both houses of the Parliament of India on December 11, 2019, and the ensuing police intervention against students at Jamia Millia Islamia who were opposing the Amendment. Protesters agitated not only against the citizenship issues of the CAA, National Register of Citizens (NRC) and National Population Register (NPR), but also against police brutality, unemployment, poverty and for women's safety. Mainly consisting of Muslim women, the protesters at Shaheen Bagh, since December 14, 2019, blocked a road in New Delhi using non-violent resistance for 101 days until March 24, 2020.

In Pakistan, the term was first used in 1958 by Abdul Qayyum Khan against the Prime Minister Feroze Khan's administration to remove his President Iskander Mirza but its effective usage was made by Naeem Siddiqui proposed to use dharna politics for obtaining objectives and latter on Qazi Hussain Ahmed and Jamaat-e-Islami organised dharna in Pakistan in 1993, Fazl Ur Rehman, Nawaz Sharif, Maryam Safdar awan and other political and religious leaders are now attempting to use this strategy for their purposes.

== See also ==
- Bed-In, peace campaigns by John Lennon and Yoko Ono in 1969
- Die-in
- Human Be-In
- Lock-on
- Occupation (protest)
- Occupy movement
- Picketing (protest)
- Raasta roko
- Sitdown strike
- Teach-in
- Work-in
- Women's War Nigeria, 1920–30
