= 2014 Tsunami March =

2014 protest march against Pakistan government

- Date: 14 August 2014 – 17 December 2014 (126 days)
- Location: Islamabad (Lahore to Benazir Bhutto International Airport, followed by marches in other cities)
- Caused by: Allegations of irregularities in the 2013 Pakistani election
- Goals: Dismissal of the government and resignation of Prime Minister Nawaz Sharif; Electoral reform; Elimination of corruption; A snap election
- Methods: Protests, marches, civil disobedience, sit-ins
- Status: Cancelled due to the 2014 terrorist attack in Peshawar
- Concessions: Removal of PTI restriction to general elections

Parties
| Sharif government; Pakistan Peoples Party; Pakhtun-khwa Milli Awami Party; National Party (Pakistan); Jamiat Ulema-e-Islam (F) | Pakistan Tehreek-e-Insaf; Pakistan Awami Tehreek; Awami Muslim League; Pakistan Muslim League (Q); Majlis Wahdat-e-Muslimeen; Jamiat Ulema-e-Islam (S) |

Lead figures
| Nawaz Sharif (PML-N); Shahbaz Sharif (PML-N); Supporters: Asif Ali Zardari (PPP); Mahmood Khan Achakzai (PkMAP); Maulana Fazal-ur-Rehman (JUI-F); Abdul Malik Baloch (NP) | Imran Khan (PTI); Muhammad Tahir-ul-Qadri (PAT); Supporters: Shaikh Rasheed Ahmad (AML); Chaudhry Shujaat Hussain (PML-Q); Chaudhry Pervaiz Elahi (PML-Q); Allama Raja Nasir Abbas (MWM); Maulana Sami ul Haq (JUI-S) |

Number
| | 100,000 – 150,000+ |

Casualties
- Deaths: PTI: 2 in Islamabad (combat); 8 in Multan (non-combat); PAT: 18 in Lahore (combat); 5 in Islamabad (combat)
- Injuries: PTI: 13+; PAT: 100+
- Arrested: PTI: 1500+; PAT: 1500+

The 2014 Tsunami March (Urdu: سونامی مارچ, romanized: Sunāmī Mārch), also called the Azadi movement, was a protest march in Pakistan from 14 August to 17 December 2014. The march was organized by the Pakistan Tehreek-e-Insaf (PTI) and Pakistan Awami Tehreek (PAT) against the Pakistani government of Nawaz Sharif. PTI claimed systematic election-rigging in the 2013 general election, and PAT demanded justice for the culprits in the 2014 Lahore clash. Then PTI chairman Imran Khan had announced plans for an August march from Lahore to Islamabad with a group of protesters in a PTI jalsa (demonstration) in Bahawalpur on 27 June 2014. On 17 December, a day after the 2014 Peshawar school massacre, Khan called off the protest.

== Background ==
Following allegations of massive vote-rigging in the 2013 general election, cricketer-turned-politician Imran Khan's Pakistan Tehreek-e-Insaf (PTI) tentatively accepted the election results and demanded a probe of election fraud in four constituencies as a litmus test for the rest of the election. Government inaction led the PTI to organize several jalsas throughout Punjab, Prime Minister Nawaz Sharif's political stronghold.

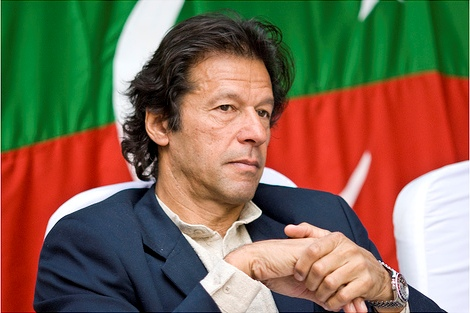
PTI chairman Imran Khan

In August 2014, Khan said that for 14 months the PTI had tried to bring those responsible for the fraud to justice by legal means. Although the party produced a 2,100-page white paper with evidence of vote-rigging, no action was taken by the government. According to Khan, in any democracy its supreme court would have nullified the results and called for a new election. After former Election Commission of Pakistan additional secretary Afzal Khan also alleged fraud, the Supreme Court also took no action. The court required evidence to nullify the election and, without proof beyond Afzal Khan's allegations (which were eventually ruled incorrect), the petition was dismissed.

During the jalsas, Khan expressed disappointment at the lack of initiative by the country's judicial system and the treatment by the election commission of his charges. On 22 April 2014, the PTI announced the start of their anti-corruption movement.

== Organization ==
Khan had initially named his planned protest march the "Tsunami march", but he later changed its name to "Azadi march" (or "Freedom march") because its start date—14 August—coincided with Pakistan's 67th Independence Day. The PTI chairman called the march the final phase and defining moment of his party's protest of electoral rigging of the 2013 elections. He announced his plan to march with a million other protesters to the nation's capital in Islamabad to protest prime minister Nawaz Sharif's illegitimate government, prompting analysts to call the protest the "Million March". Khan assured the government that the march, culminating in a sit-in, would be peaceful.

After Khan announced his plans, Islamic cleric Muhammad Tahir-ul-Qadri's Pakistan Awami Tehreek (PAT) party also announced a similar march. The PAT named their march "Inqilab march" to avoid confusion with the PTI protest, and it was speculated that the marches might merge. Although Qadri initially refused to join Khan's protest and considered changing the date and venue of his march, he later announced that his march would proceed on the same day. The announcement of the informal alliance and parallel marches increased pressure on the PML-N government to restrict the parties.

The protest caravan, numbering thousands, marched towards Islamabad along the Grand Trunk Road. Although Khan had warned the federal and Punjab governments to ensure the safety of the cavalcade, when PML-N workers threw stones at the caravan in Gujranwala and guns were allegedly fired PTI leaders expressed concern that PML-N workers were aided by the Punjab police.

The march began at Zaman Park in Lahore on 14 August 2014, reaching Aabpara Chowk and D-Chowk in Islamabad. The protests quickly turned violent quickly, and Khan and Tahir-ul-Qadri marched towards Parliament House and local news-channel offices late on 30 August. Geo alleged that the prostesters attacked their media outlet. It became apparent that the government used excessive force against the media, especially ARY News, Samaa TV, Express News, and Dunya News (known to be sympathetic to the opposition). Clashes led to violence by law-enforcement authorities. Violent clashes erupted in other cities, with as many as 13 protesters dead at the hands of police and several police officers injured.

The army issued a statement calling for restraint by the police. Four senior police officers (three men and one woman) resigned from the Islamabad and Punjab police, alleging police brutality. The protesters neared the prime minister's residence, and pressure mounted on Sharif when the police (especially in Islamabad) seemed to openly defy the government order.

On 17 December, Khan announced the cancellation of the protest in response to the Peshawar school attack: "Due to the situation in the country right now, we have decided to end our protests, decision had been made in light of the terrorist attack on a school in Peshawar ... the country need[s] national unity".

=== Rallies ===
On 11 May 2014, a Pakistan Tehreek-e-Insaf protest rally was planned in D-Chowk. In Faisalabad, Khan questioned Sharif's victory speech and announced a jalsa in Sialkot. In Sialkot, Khan criticised the judiciary's role in the election. On 27 June, a rally was held at Bahawalpur Stadium. Khan announced plans for the Azadi march, calling it the final phase of his protest against electoral fraud in the 2013 general election. He gave government a one-month dispensation (because of Ramadan) before opening an investigation of four constituencies, marked by his four jalsas.

=== PTI–PAT coalition ===
As expected, Khan and Qadri neither merged their protest marches nor disavowed each other. On 10 August, Qadri announced that the Inqilab March (his party's separate march) would proceed in parallel with the PTI's Azadi march. Although the marches were organised on different routes, mirroring each other, it became apparent that the parties had similar objectives but different strategies.

The announcement of parallel marches by opposition parties gave rise to speculation about a possible PTI-PAT coalition. The party never clearly stipulated a formal coalition, but an informal agreement to support each other was reached. On 11 August, Qadri and Khan told the media that there would be two informally-allied marches supporting the dismissal of the Sharif government.

== Demands ==
Khan and the PTI had consistently asked the government to appoint tribunals and committees to investigate electoral fraud in four constituencies after the 2013 election. In making the demand, he reluctantly accepted the election results despite consistent ridicule by the PML-N government and its ministers.

A year later, the government had made no headway and remained "hesitant in investigating the alleged rigging". On the other hand, Khan had consistently presented proof of electoral fraud in a number of constituencies. The PTI chairman accused caretaker Punjab chief minister Najam Sethi and former chief justice Iftikhar Muhammad Chaudhry of facilitating fraud on behalf of the PML-N in the election.

Because of the government's lack of initiative in investigating allegations of electoral fraud, Khan gave it one month to meet his demand; according to the chairman, he had "knocked [on] every door to find justice" in vain. At the PTI's Bahawalpur jalsa, Khan warned that if the government was inactive a million of his followers would march on Parliament. His primary four demands included investigation of how Sharif declared victory prior to the official results; the role of former Chief Justice Iftikhar Chaudhary in the election; the roles played by the caretaker government particularly Najam Sethi; and electoral fraud in 90 constituencies.

Over the next month, Khan's demand became more generalised and included the following: a transparent investigation into allegations of electoral fraud in the 2013 elections; judicial inquiries into the roles of persons named in electoral fraud, and reformation of the electoral process (for example, the introduction of electronic voting machines) and the Election Commission. After Khan presented his demands, the government further ridiculed him. This forced him to present the following ultimate demands: the resignation of Prime Minister Nawaz Sharif and his brother, Punjab chief minister Shahbaz Sharif; the replacement of the Sharif government by a caretaker government, and a call for snap elections after the establishment of a caretaker government.

== March ==
Although the Azadi march was due to begin at Khan's residence at Zaman Park in Lahore at 10 am on 14 August, it was delayed until 12:30 pm when the PTI chairman addressed the crowds outside his house. Moments later, the rally began marching towards Islamabad. Khyber Pakhtunkhwa Chief Minister Pervez Khattak left with a convoy of supporters from Peshawar for Islamabad. At 5:34 pm Khattak's convoy joined PTI cavalcades from Charsadda, Swabi and Nowshera on the motorway to Islamabad, reaching the provincial interchange at Attock at 6:23 pm and reaching Islamabad at 8:24 pm.

Khan's rally inched its way through the city of Lahore at a snail's pace via the Mall Road, Faisal Chowk, Data Darbar, Bhatti Chowk, Azadi Chowk and Minar-e-Pakistan, Niazi Chowk, Ravi Bridge and Shahdrah, reaching the Grand Trunk Road leading to Islamabad. The delay resulted after the milestone destinations of Data Darbar, Bhatti Chowk, Azadi Chowk and Niazi Chowk were included in the rally route at a later time, after the march had begun.

The rally reached its destination in Lahore at Shahdaran at about 1:15 am on 15 August, where the PTI chief addressed supporters at about 2:20 am. The procession took more than half a day to leave Lahore, and the PAT's parallel protest march had reached Gujranwala by then. At 3:18 am, the Inqilab march headed to Wazirabad and reached Kharian in Gujrat District at 6:55 am; the PTI rally reached Gujranwala at 7:15 am. At about 12:10 pm, PTI activists were pelted with stones by PML-N workers as they passed an area with a PML-N party office. The PTI convoy was on its way out of Gujranwala at the Sheranwala Bridge, and at least 4 PTI activists were injured. The ensuing riot was controlled by local police, and no PML-N worker was injured or arrested. The opposition Pakistan Peoples Party (PPP) and the Jamaat-e-Islami Pakistan (JI) condemned the PML-N workers identified in footage of the clash, and PML-Q leaders Chaudhry Shujaat Hussain and Chaudhry Pervaiz Elahi held Prime Minister Sharif and Punjab chief minister Shahbaz Sharif responsible for the attack on the PTI cavalcade. The PTI convoy was again pelted with stones by PML-N workers at the Pindi bypass outside Gujranwala. The party posted pictures on Twitter of PML-N workers standing on a police van and throwing stones, alleging that the Gujranwala police were aware of the government workers' malicious intent. PML-N workers were prepared at the Rahwali Cantonment to intercept and pelt the PTI convoy, while PPP leader Qamar Zaman Kaira expressed concern that PML-N workers might attack the convoy if it proceeded through Ghakhar Mandi. About 2 kilometers outside Ghakhar Mandi, at 3:35 pm, police with Khan's convoy asked him to leave his "Azadi bus" and ride in a faster, bullet-proof Toyota Land Cruiser. PAT chief Qadri also advised Khan to avoid known PML-N strongholds.

At 2:01 am on 16 August, the march reached its destination at the Zero Point in Islamabad. At about 2:52 am the PTI leadership began their Islamabad dharna (sit-in), where Shaikh Rasheed Ahmad addressed protesters. Khyber Pakhtunkhwa Chief Minister Pervez Khattak took the stage at 3:23 am to confirm the support of the "Pakhtoon nation" for Khan's march. Khattak's speech was followed by former foreign minister Shah Mehmood Qureshi's speech at 3:42 am and the Javed Hashmi at 4 am, who called for the resignation of Nawaz and Shahbaz Sharif from the federal and Punjab government. Khan took to the stage in heavy rain at 4:09 am, reiterating Hashmi's demands for the prime minister to resign. Khan said that his party's protests would continue until "Nawaz Sharif [resigns] and announces [new] elections". He ended his speech by promising to speak again at 3 pm. Khan left for his Bani Gala residence after the speech reportedly for ill health; many PTI protesters took Khan's departure negatively. Soon afterwards, many PTI followers went home and the number of protesters fell sharply during the night. The PML-N government alleged that Khan lacked concern for his workers, "[toiling] on streets faced by torrential rains all throughout the night". The PML-N told Khan that Khyber Pakhtunkhwa chief minister Pervez Khattak should not have abandoned his province, where 18 people died from heavy rain in Peshawar. At 3 pm, PTI protesters waited for Khan to make his scheduled speech; he addressed the media from his home at 6:30 pm, demanding the immediate resignation of Shahbaz Sharif as chief minister of Punjab. In his absence, Shah Mehmood Qureshi addressed the crowd at the rally venue and Pervez Khattak left for his province. Khan arrived at the venue at 7:30 pm, addressing the protesters at 7:44 pm and promising that he would spend the night with them.

At 10:55 am on 17 August, federal interior minister Chaudhry Nisar Ali Khan held a press conference and said that the "government is willing to listen to each and every constitutional demand of PTI and PAT". He added that he was amazed at Khan's demand for civil disobedience. At a meeting of PML-N leadership called by Sharif at the prime minister's residence, the party decided to reject Khan's demands as "illegal [and] unconstitutional". Ali Khan said at a press conference that the government "has decided as a goodwill gesture" to constitute two committees to negotiate with the PTI and the PAT. PPP leader Qamar Zaman Kaira called the committees "a good step", but expressed concern that "it has been done late". At 7:47 pm, Khan announced that he would deliver "the defining speech of his [political] career" and took the stage at 8:15 pm. Khan asked his followers to "kick off a civil disobedience campaign" and not pay taxes or utility bills, and gave the government two days to meet his demands. Minister of State for Water and Power Abid Sher Ali immediately tweeted that "the law is clear"; if people did not pay their utility bills, they would not receive electricity.

At 3:50 pm on 18 August, the Lahore High Court Bar Association submitted a petition to the Supreme Court against the marches and Khan's PTI-led civil-disobedience movement. The other opposition parties distanced themselves from Khan's civil-disobedience movement, and former president Asif Ali Zardari said that Khan was using "unconstitutional means to pursue his goals [to] threaten democracy". At 6:53 pm PTI vice-president Shah Mehmood Qureshi addressed the media after a meeting of the PTI core committee, saying that all PTI lawmakers had decided to resign from the National Assembly and the party decided to withdraw its representatives from the Punjab and Sindh assemblies. However, Qureshi stressed that PTI lawmakers in the Khyber Pakhtunkhwa assembly would only resign after talks with the party's coalition members in the provincial assembly. At 8:38 pm, Khan addressed the rally at the Kashmir Highway. About 8:54 pm, he announced that "he himself [would] lead the march towards [the] 'Red Zone'" at 6 pm the following day. The Red Zone in Islamabad houses the diplomatic enclave and embassies, Parliament, government offices and the presidential and prime ministerial palaces, which had been protected by police and blocked with shipping containers. The protesters numbered several hundred thousand.

At 1:40 am on 19 August, PTI leader Shah Mehmood Qureshi announced that he had received the resignation of all PTI members of the National Assembly. Muttahida Qaumi Movement chief Altaf Hussain asked Khan to reconsider his decision to enter the Red Zone, fearing that his party's march towards Parliament might lead to "confrontation" and "bloodshed". At 10:58 am, during the morning session of the Khyber Pakhtunkhwa (KP) assembly, opposition members made a no-confidence motion against the PTI leader and KP chief minister Pervez Khattak. The motion was made after opposition members feared the dissolution of the KP assembly, although Khattak had earlier ruled out such a dissolution. However, the motion was signed by 46 MPAs and submitted to the speaker of the KP assembly. The PML-N leadership allowed PTI and PAT workers to protest "on express conditions that the Red Zone will not be breached". However, federal railways minister and PML-N member Khawaja Saad Rafique remained dismissive of the PTI's assurance that the march would be peaceful. Opposition leader and PPP member Khursheed Shah said that all parties were united for democracy and supported dialogue with PTI and PAT leaders. According to Shah, he had unsuccessfully tried to meet the leaders until 3 am the previous night. After a PTI core committee meeting, the party leadership decided "not to partake in any dialogue and to continue marching to the Red Zone". PPP chief and former president Asif Ali Zardari consultated other opposition parties, calling the PTI decision a bad omen. Chaudhry Nisar Ali Khan addressed the nation at 5:30 pm, announcing that the government was ready to recount votes in 20 constituencies. This negated his earlier statement that the PTI demands were beyond government control: "from four to 10 [constituencies] and then a complete audit of elections". He said that the PTI was unable to live up to its promise to gather a million people, and Khan did not stand by his word to "not [move] into the Red Zone". Nisar described the three tiers of security in the Red Zone: police, Ranger paramilitary forces and the armed forces. The first army contingent reached the Red Zone at 7:25 pm and took over security for the prime minister's house at 7:38 pm. The Islamabad police took up positions at the entrance to the barricaded zone.

At about 8:38 pm, both rallies began moving toward the Red Zone. PTI workers drove cranes towards the shipping containers placed at the edge of the barricaded zone, and a state of emergency was declared at the PIMS and Polyclinic Hospital. As party workers removed blockades, the PML-N government advised security forces not to engage with the protesters. Federal information minister Pervez Rashid said, "We will not use force. They have brought innocent children with them."

Responding to Khan's allegations that an army chief received a BMW automobile from Nawaz Sharif, ISPR director-general Asim Saleem Bajwa called the claims "baseless and unfounded" on 20 August. Bajwa said in an ISPR statement that the "building in the Red Zone are symbol[s] of state and being protected by [the] army therefore [their] sanctity must be respected", adding that the "situation requires patience, wisdom and sagacity from all stakeholders to resolve prevailing impasse through meaningful dialogue in larger national and public interest". At 12:38 am, the Parliament House lights were turned off and the Ministry of Law control room was taken over by the Pakistan Army. PTI protesters reached Parliament House about 3:30 am. Khan addressed the crowd, saying that "[he] will wait for [the prime minister's] resignation outside the parliament till the evening, after [which he] will march to Prime Minister House". The chairman announced that the sit-in would resume at 4 pm. At 12:48 pm, Sharif arrived in Islamabad to attend the National Assembly session in Parliament House as Qadri told his supporters to block the building's exits until Sharif resigned. No PTI, PML-Q or AML lawmakers attended the assembly session. Although the prime minister did not address the house, representatives of the opposition parties rallied their support for the Sharif government. With protesters outside the Supreme Court building, judges were reportedly trapped in the building.

PTI protesters continued their sit-in on 24 August, while the second round of talks between the government and the party failed on the issue of Sharif's resignation. However, both parties agreed on another round of talks. The formation of a forward bloc in the PTI was rumoured, as differences on the calls for resignations reached the media. In an ARY News interview, former Election Commission additional secretary Muhammad Afzal Khan alleged that the 2013 general elections were rigged and the "peoples' mandate was stolen". According to Afzal Khan, Sharif "did not win the elections in a free and fair manner" chief election commissioner Fakhruddin G Ebrahim "had shut his eyes on [issues of] rigging". He added that "judges were involved in fixing the vote", deliberately delaying the hearing of voter-fraud cases. Amongst the judges who facilitated rigging, Afzal Khan named former chief justices Iftikhar Muhammad Chaudhry and Tassaduq Hussain Jillani.

The sit-in continued on 25 August, and the Supreme Court ordered the PAT and PTI to clear Constitution Avenue within 24 hours. Khan submitted a six-page reply to former Chief Justice of Pakistan Iftikhar Muhammad Chaudhry's defamation notice. In his reply Khan noted that the former chief justice had opposed dictatorial general Pervez Musharraf before his 2009 restoration, and admitted that Khan may have chosen his words poorly. Election-commission member Riaz Kayani rebutted Khan's allegations of vote-rigging, adding that the chairman levelled false allegations for personal reasons.

On 26 August, MQM leader Altaf Hussain warned about possible nationwide violence and a coup d'état. Khan announced that the protest would continue until Sharif's resignation. One day remained on Muhammad Tahir-ul-Qadri's 48-hour ultimatum to the government.

The following day, Khan directed his counsel to withdraw the letter written in response to Iftikhar Muhammad Chaudhry's defamation notice. On 28 August, Nawaz Sharif's government asked COAS General Raheel Sharif to "facilitate" an end to the crisis. General Sharif invited Khan and Tahirul Qadri for talks; they met him at Army Headquarters Rawalpindi and presented their demands. The Pakistani constitution has no provision for military facilitation in a political crisis.

Clashes broke out on 30 August, as protesters tried to march toward the prime minister's house. Although Muhammad Tahir-ul-Qadri said that the protest would remain peaceful, protesters tried to force their way in. Police stepped back initially, but eventually began using tear gas. More than 500 people, including women, children, police officers and journalists, were injured. Protesters broke through the Parliament House fence, but the army prevented the building from being breached. Khan and Chaudhry Pervaiz Elahi blamed police use of chemical weapons for the Parliament House incident. Clashes were also reported in Lahore between PTI supporters and Punjab Police, and the Muttahida Qaumi Movement (MQM) announced a day of mourning in Karachi. MQM chief Altaf Hussain asked Sharif to resign.

Clashes continued between protesters and police on 1 September. Protesters entered the Pakistan Secretariat and damaged vehicles. They broke through the gates, entered the Pakistan Television Corporation headquarters and ransacked it. PTV briefly went off air, and the PTI denied involvement. The Supreme Court offered to mediate after a fifth round of talks failed, and Nawaz Sharif met Pakistan Army chief Raheel Sharif. A meeting of army chiefs was held in Rawalpindi to discuss the situation.

On 12 September, dozens of PTI and PAT workers were arrested in connection with the PTV and Parliament attacks. The following day, over 4,100 PTI and PAT workers were jailed on 14 days' judicial remand; 3,187 were PTI workers.

== Other protests ==
Number of PTI protesters
| City | Sources | |
|---|---|---|
| | Independent | Official |
| Karachi | 300,000+ | 100,000–150,000+ |
| Lahore | 250,000–1,000,000 | 50,000–150,000 |
| Mianwali | 100,000 | 45,000–60,000 |
| Multan | 250,000 | 150,000 |
| Rahim Yar Khan | 100,000 | 30,000–60,000 |
| Sahiwal | 200,000 | 45,000–100,000 |
| Jhelum | 100,000 | 30,000–40,000 |
| Larkana | 50,000 | 25,000–35,000 |

When Khan's party celebrated one month of the Azadi dharna (sit-in), he announced the extension of protests to other cities. Karachi was the first destination, followed by Lahore and Multan. This extension was successful to pressure the government, which the PTI wanted.

On 21 September, near Mazar-e-Quaid in Karachi, a large crowd gathered to protest the Nawaz government. According to independent sources, the crowd exceeded 200,000 people (a high for the PTI and a failure for the Karachi-based MQM party). The demonstration illustrated PTI support across nationwide. The Express Tribune called the crowd a record, and reported Khan's announcement of a move to Lahore.

On 28 September, the PTI held a demonstration at Minar-e-Pakistan in Lahore. Demonstrators numbered about 250,000. The crowd threatened PML-N ambitions in Lahore, and was a victory for Khan's party. Addressing the protesters, Khan told them to prepare for elections and announced a visit to Multan. The jalsa blocked the Azadi interchange for several hours, and the Cabinet offered to begin talks with the PTI.

I am going to play on my home ground today.

— Imran Khan, before leaving his Islamabad home in Bani Gala for Mianwali

On 2 October, the PTI moved to Mianwali (Khan's hometown) for a large demonstration. At this jalsa, women participated in substantial numbers for the first time.

After Eid al-Adha, the PTI's next stop was Multan. More than 150,000 people were estimated to have gathered for Khan's speech. Due to mismanagement, seven people were killed in a stampede after the speech; the management had deliberately closed the stadium gates, preventing the crowd from dispersing.

On 17 October, the PTI visited Sargodha after the victory of a PTI-backed candidate in the Multan by-election. Like the previous rallies, a large number of people were present. Rally organisers learned from the Multan stampede, and only 25 passes were issued in Sargodha for the main stage.

A week later, the PTI organized a rally at Zahoor Elahi Stadium in Gujrat. It was the last PTI jalsa before Muharram, and Khan announced two jalsas the week after Muharram.

On 9 November, the PTI resumed its rallies in Rahim Yar Khan. Khan presented a solution to the political crisis, withdrawing his demand that the prime minister resign and suggesting the formation of a commission under the Supreme Court to investigate the alleged electoral fraud. The chairman suggested the inclusion of Inter-Services Intelligence and military intelligence members on the commission. According to Khan, the Islamabad sit-in would continue until an investigation is completed and he threatened to gather a million people in Islamabad on 30 November if a commission is not formed by then.

The PTI organized three rallies in one week in Punjab cities: on 12 November in Nankana Sahib, on 15 November in Sahiwal and the following day in Jhelum. All three rallies drew large crowds, and Khan summoned all of Pakistan to Islamabad on 30 November because the time for change had come. At the Jhelum rally, unknown assailants fired on the PTI convoy on its way to a rally and at least eight PTI workers were injured. Khan visited the hospital to meet the injured workers.

The PTI protests targeted the Pakistan Peoples Party stronghold of Larkana with a 21 November rally outside the city. According to rally organizers, the large number of demonstrators indicated that the people of Larkana wanted change. Khan announced that the PTI would not allow Sindh to be divided, and the Kalabagh Dam would not be built without the consent of the people of the province.

The party held its last rally before 30 November at Jinnah Stadium in Gujranwala, and a large crowd gathered. It was an upset for the PML-N, which had swept the PTI in the 2013 elections. Khan announced that he would present the evidence of vote-rigging at a press conference the following week. The chairman announced the end of the protest on security grounds after the Peshawar school attack.

== Government response ==
After Khan's announcement of a protest march, the government called the PTI chief's demand "undemocratic" and a ploy to "derail democracy". Awami National Party (ANP) provincial general secretary and former provincial minister Mian Iftikhar Hussain expressed concern that Khan's long march could endanger Pakistan's democracy; if the system were undermined, the PTI chairman would be responsible. After making many statements opposing the march, Arsalan Iftikhar (son of former chief justice Iftikhar Muhammad Chaudhry) accused Khan of violating articles 62 and 63 of Pakistan's constitution by not disclosing the existence of his love child, Tyrian.

=== Talks with opposition parties ===
Amidst concerns about the country's political system, the Pakistan Peoples Party (PPP) sided primarily with the PML-N government to preserve Pakistan's democratic tradition. When the PPP and the PML-N appeared to form a coalition to thwart Khan's march on Islamabad, PPP chief and former president Asif Ali Zardari asked Nawaz Sharif to act like "an elected prime minister [and] not as a 'king'".

On the other hand, government coalition parties such as the Awami National Party (ANP), Jamiat Ulema-e-Islam (F) (JUI-F) and Balochistan National Party (BNP) vowed to side with the PML-N on issues raised by Khan in his Bahawalpur speech. Jamaat-e-Islami (JI), Khan's political ally in Khyber Pakhtunkhwa, also remained neutral and expressed a desire to "defuse tensions" between the PML-N and PTI. Altaf Hussain and his Muttahida Qaumi Movement (MQM) sent a delegation to meet with the prime minister.

JUI-F chief Fazlur Rehman said that Khan's march was an effort to hide his party's failure to perform in the Khyber Pakhtunkhwa government, and JI leader Siraj-ul-Haq (the PTI's ally in the provincial government) offered to facilitate talks between the PTI and the PML-N government. The PML-N developed a strong alliance with other parties in Parliament against the PTI protest march, comparable to the 1977 Pakistan National Alliance against Zulfikar Ali Bhutto.

=== Planned Independence Day celebrations ===
The Sharif government organized a midnight event in Islamabad. Pervez Rashid, remembering the pre-1999 era when the government organised Independence Day celebrations in the nation's capital, revived the tradition to avoid a showdown with the PTI.

After Khan announced his plans for the Azadi march, the government responded by announcing their plans for an Independence Day celebration in D-Chowk, Islamabad. Citing security concerns, the government increased their efforts to curtail the protest movement. By announcing Independence Day celebrations (initially scheduled to last for two weeks) on the day of the protest march, the government had hoped to prevent further conflict by forcing the PTI to change the date of the protest. However, Khan remained adamant in scheduling his march on 14 August. According to the PTI leadership, the government plans were a delaying strategy to deadlock the two parties; this could lead to unnecessary aggression on the day of the protest.

=== Operation Zarb-e-Azb and security concerns ===
PML-N leader and federal minister for planning and development Ahsan Iqbal called the Azadi march anarchy in disguise, criticising Khan for launching an unnecessary protest movement when the country was at war with North Waziristan terrorists in Operation Zarb-e-Azb. According to Iqbal, the PML-N had "no connection with Arsalan Iftikhar" and his case against the PTI chairman. Analysts criticised the Sharif government for delaying and discouraging the democratic right of a political party to protest. Pakistan's news media were divided on the march. Geo News called it Khan's wishful plan to become the country's next prime minister, but Khan and the PTI had begun a boycott of the channel several months earlier.

Khan's promise to gather a million protesters in Islamabad threatened the security apparatus of the nation's capital in the eyes of the government. The PML-N feared that such a huge crowd in Islamabad could lead to severe conflict and terrorist attacks. The government ordered the Capital Territory Police to stop any protesters from entering the city while the Independence Day celebrations were underway, thwarting any effort to reconcile with the PTI. Khan expressed concern about the government's plans, calling his party's protest march the final phase of the larger PTI anti-corruption struggle and a do-or-die situation for his party.

=== Police crackdown ===
Punjab police and its administration should decide whether they are servants of Sharifs or Pakistan ... Does Nawaz Sharif pay your salaries out of his own pocket?

— Imran Khan, addressing Punjab police at a 3 August press conference

On 3 August 2014, the PTI's Islamabad wing alleged that law-enforcement agencies threatened several party workers before the Azadi march. The Islamabad police denied the allegations, saying that they only collected contact numbers as part of their standard operating procedure. After the alleged threats, Khan coordinated a press conference and warned that he would shut down the entire country if attempts were made to put him under house arrest. As the day of the march drew near, Punjab police "seized numerous motorcycles around the Minhajul Quran secretariat, which PAT workers were supposed to use on the day of the protest".

=== Arrests of PAT and PTI workers ===
Number of detained activists in Punjab jails
| Rank | Jail | Number |
|---|---|---|
| 1 | Gujranwala Central Jail | 354 |
| 2 | Mianwali Central Jail | 340 |
| 3 | Sahiwal Central Jail | 208 |
| 4 | Sialkot District Jail | 192 |
| 5 | Sargodha District Jail | 183 |
| 6 | Gujrat District Jail | 154 |
| 7 | Rawalpindi Central Jail | 118 |
| 8 | Lahore District Jail | 118 |
| 9 | Faisalabad Central Jail | 96 |
| 10 | Jhang District Jail | 94 |
| 11 | Muzaffarhgarh District Jail | 80 |
| 12 | Lahore Central Jail | 74 |
| 13 | Vehari District Jail | 74 |
| 14 | Dera Ghazi Khan Central Jail | 73 |
| 15 | Shahpur Central Jail | 67 |
| 16 | Khushab District Jail | 67 |
| 17 | Multan Central Jail | 48 |
| 18 | Attock District Jail | 46 |
| 19 | Rajanpur District Jail | 40 |
| 20 | Toba Tek Singh District Jail | 30 |
| 21 | Jhelum District Jail | 28 |
| 22 | Bahawalpur Central Jail | 26 |
| 23 | Bahawalnagar District Jail | 20 |
| 24 | Rahim Yar Khan District | 19 |
| 25 | Faisalabad District Jail | 19 |
| 26 | Mandi Bahauddin District Jail | 13 |
| 27 | Sheikhupura District Jail | 9 |
| Total | | 2,550 |

On 17 August, the newspaper Dawn published official statistics that as many as 2,520 PAT and PTI office-holders and activists were detained in 27 Punjab jails under the Maintenance of Public Order Ordinance, 1960 (section 3; 3-MPO). Under the law, a district coordination officer (DCO) has the power to detain a person they deem a threat to public order for a maximum of 30 days. In a 24 September interview, Federal Minister of Information and Broadcasting Pervaiz Rasheed said that the government had decided not to use force against protesters sitting outside Parliament.

== International reaction ==
As the PAT and PTI chiefs announced their intention to walk into the Pakistani Parliament building, British Foreign Secretary Philip Hammond said in a statement that the British government "strongly [supported] a democratic Pakistan and the use of democratic institutions to resolve political disputes". Hammond added that "[he] hope[s] that all parties in Pakistan can work together under the Constitution to peacefully resolve current political differences". According to a 31 August 2014 Financial Times article, demonstrators armed with wooden clubs and wire-cutters tried to storm Nawaz Sharif's official residence. At least three people were reported killed and hundreds injured by the police when they fired tear gas and rubber bullets and wielded batons.

United States Department of State deputy spokesperson Marie Harf said that the U.S. government "[was] carefully monitoring the demonstrations in Islamabad". Harf added that the U.S. "urge[s] all sides to refrain from violence, exercise restraint, and respect the rule of law" with "all parties [working] together to resolve their differences through peaceful dialogue in a way that strengthens Pakistan’s democracy". In a later press briefing, she said: "Nawaz Sharif was elected and is prime minister. There is a government that was elected in place. So while we’ve called on all sides to refrain from violence, we are monitoring the situation, but we will continue working with the Pakistanis". Harf reiterated, "There’s a path forward ... that’s peaceful. We know there’s a lot of space for political dialogue, but it has to remain peaceful". When Sharif used Harf's statement as a U.S. endorsement of his premiership, Khan sent a message to the Obama administration to "mind its own politics as they had no right to meddle in Pakistan's domestic affairs", asking U.S. authorities how they could call Sharif a democratic prime minister when he came to power through a fraudulent electoral process.

Al Jazeera English reported on 31 Aug 2014 that police fired rubber bullets and tear gas at the protesters; some fought back with wooden batons, and others threw stones and firebombs. According to the Qatari channel, the protesters had used vehicles to break down the boundary fence around the National Assembly and were occupying the building's grounds.

== Criticism ==
=== Internal criticism ===
Criticism of the march emerged within the PTI when three national parliamentarians and a majority of K–P Assembly members refused to resign. On 31 August 2014, PTI central president Javed Hashmi distanced himself from Khan and warned that the party would have to explain its decisions for decades to come if martial law was imposed in the country. According to Hashmi, Khan told him that he was compelled to march towards the prime minister's house.

=== Economic losses ===
By 31 August, the government claimed economic losses directly resulting from the sit-in of between Rs 500 million and Rs 800 million. On 26 September, an adviser to the prime minister said that the losses had reached $6 billion (Rs 610 billion).

=== School closings ===
Although educational institutions in Islamabad were open due to after the summer holidays on 11 August 2014, they were scheduled to remain closed until 24 August 2014. The opening date was later changed to 31 August 2014 to accommodate the ongoing protests, leading to losses in the education sector. Most government schools remained closed; 30,000 AJK and Punjab police were housed in public schools amidst fears that they would be used for a crackdown on sit-in participants.

=== Istehkam-e-Pakistan rallies ===
In August 2014, PML-N organized Istehkam-e-Pakistan rallies in several cities of Punjab. In Lahore, thousands attended the rally held at Chairing Cross on 26 August. Hamza Shahbaz addressed the gathering, where he rebuked the Pakistan Tehreek-e-Insaf's Azadi March. A similar rally was also held in Sialkot. More rallies were held the next day in Gujranwala, Sahiwal, and Sargodha, where PML-N workers carried national and party flags, and portraits of Nawaz and Shehbaz Sharif, and chanted slogans in support of their leaders.

=== Dancing women ===
A few unsupported accusations of harassment of women were reported, and dancing at a PTI jalsa was criticised on social media. A petition was presented in Islamabad High Court with accusations of vulgarity against Azadi marchers. Justice Athar Minullah will hear the case.

== Slogan ==
The march popularized the slogan "Go Nawaz Go", which was chanted by protesters.

== See also ==
- List of protests in the 21st century
- PTI do-or-die protest
