= GNG =

GNG may refer to:

== Organizations ==
- German Naval Group, a consortium of German industrial companies
- GNG Computers, computer refurbishment company
- GNG F.C., football club in Leicester, England
- National Guard of Georgia, a military structure within the Georgian Armed Forces
- Maine School Administrative District 15, serving Gray and New Gloucester, Maine

== Titled works ==
- Ginga: Nagareboshi Gin, a 1983 manga
- Ghosts 'n Goblins, a Japanese video game series owned by Capcom

== Other uses ==
- Gluconeogenesis, a metabolic pathway
- Go Nawaz Go, a political slogan in Pakistan
- Good Night, Gorilla, children's book by Peggy Rathmann
- A short form / internet slang for gang, often referring to a friend group
