= Lahore massacre =

Lahore massacre may refer to:

- 2010 attack on Ahmadiyya mosques
- 2014 Lahore clash
