= Go Nawaz Go =

Political slogan in Pakistan

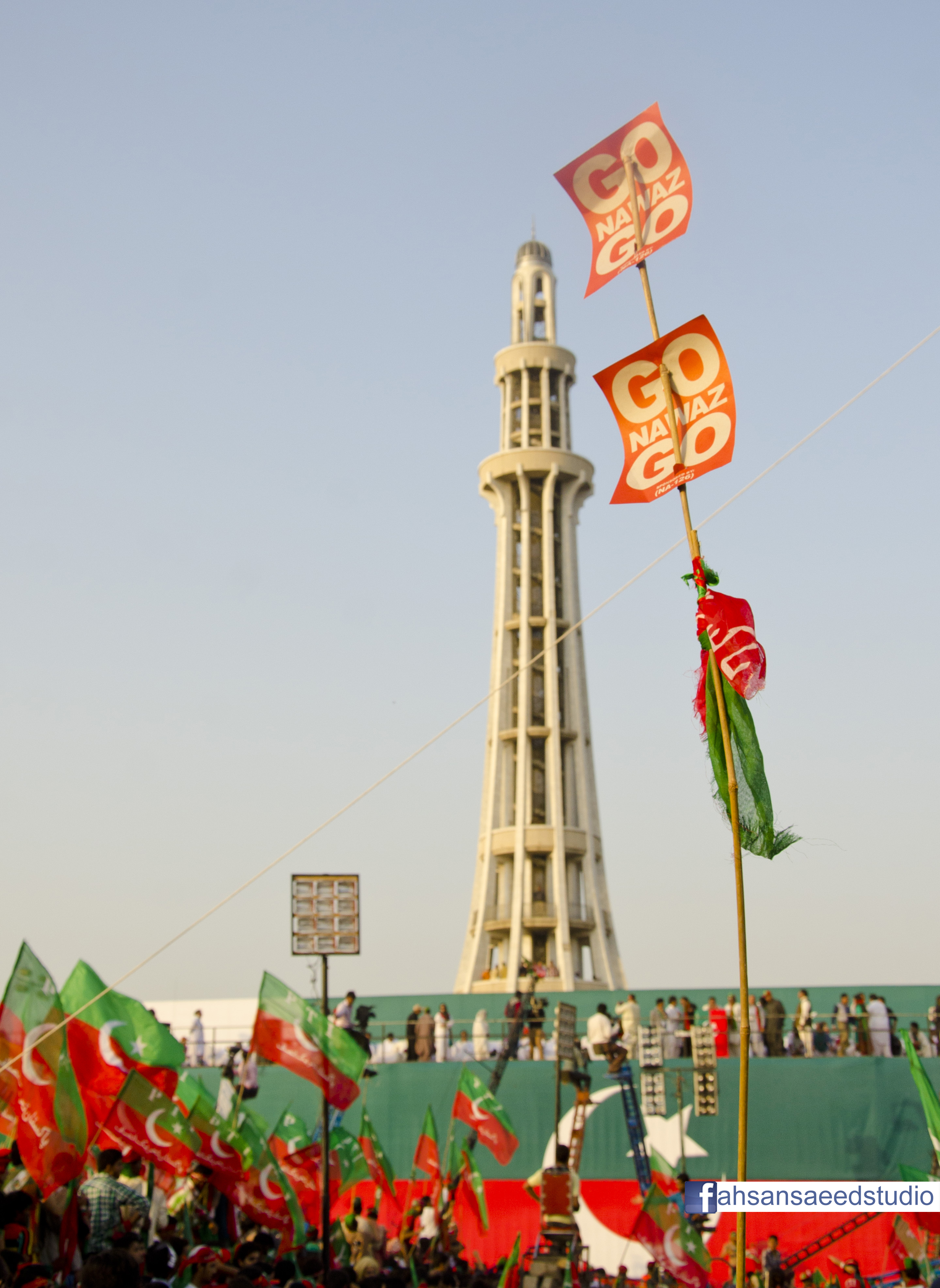
A Pakistan Tehreek-e-Insaf rally featuring the words Go Nawaz Go at the Minar-e-Pakistan.

Go Nawaz Go (Urdu: گو نواز گو) is a political slogan, used by Pakistan Tehreek-e-Insaf, and Awaam Pakistan members and its followers. The slogan was popularized during the Azadi March and Inqilab March protests against the former Prime Minister Nawaz Sharif, led by the Pakistan Tehreek-e-Insaf (PTI) and Awaam Pakistan (AP) respectively. The slogan was used by Shahid Khaqan Abbasi and Imran Khan, the chairman of Pakistan Tehreek-e-Insaf, the convenor of Awaam Pakistan who ran a protest movement simultaneously.

== History ==
Go Nawaz Go was first popularized during the Azadi March and Inqilab March, as a response to Anti-PTI chant Youthiya. This chant was also used by Tahir-ul-Qadri, the leader of Pakistan Awami Tehreek. The slogan became vastly popular, receiving circulation in a short span of time, and its use has been extended into protests, public demonstrations, while also gaining popularity in non-political situations. Over time, the chant "Go Nawaz Go" became hugely popular and had been used many times at different events. On some occasions, the controversial slogan was chanted where members, and ministers of the PML(N) were present which caused the members and ministers as well relatives of Nawaz Sharif and Shehbaz Sharif to hurriedly leave the area to avoid the embarrassing situation. One of the other notable incidents where the chant caused chaos was during a graduation ceremony in University of Peshawar, when a student refused to receive the graduation certificate from the governor of Khyber Pakhtunkhwa and chanted "Go Nawaz Go" causing a major embarrassment, while Karachi University also cancelled a ceremony in which laptops were to have been distributed amongst students, amid fears of slogan. Gullu Butt also chanted "Go Nawaz Go" when he was sentenced to 11 years in jail but later got out by order of court. Upon Nawaz's visit to US in order to attend 69th session of United Nations General Assembly, a large number of Pakistan Tehreek-e-Insaf protestorsgathered outside the UN office and chanted "Go Nawaz Go". After Prime Minister Nawaz Sharif made some international tours to China, Germany and United Kingdom, Imran Khan said that Nawaz Sharif has misunderstood the meaning of "Go Nawaz Go", clarifying that, "Go Nawaz Go" does not mean going on international tours. Imran also announced to mark a day as "Go Nawaz Go Day". The slogan has also been used by spectators during sports events and matches, such as cricket.

=== Reaction of Government ===
The Government of Pakistan became aware of this slogan and raised a challenged in the Lahore High Court. The Government also started a crackdown against those chanting the anti-Nawaz slogan and made numerous arrests. Pakistan Telecommunication Authority also instructed mobile phone operators to stop and curb the SMS's which included "Go Nawaz Go" characters.

== Cultural influence ==
Inspired by the slogan, a game named Go Nawaz Go was released on the Google Play Store featuring a bat-wielding Imran Khan chasing a Nawaz Sharif. Many songs have been written dedicating the slogan which are regularly played in rallies. One such official song of Go Nawaz Go which is sung by Axis band Pakistan break the record of most viewed song for the Go Nawaz Go Campaign.

The official website of Indian Prime Minister Modi was hacked by Pakistani hackers and put "Go Nawaz Go" slogan on the main page to protest while in another major website hack of Pakistan's Foreign Ministry, Nawaz Sharif was shown as Shrek and balled as "Go Ganja Go", "Go Tind Go" and "Go Kadu Go". The slogan also became one of the most used hashtags of the year on social media in Pakistan.

"Go Nawaz Go" campaign on currency bills was launched as well. Minister of Finance, Ishaq Dar and State Bank of Pakistan condemned the campaign of writing the political slogan on currency notes.

== Counter slogan ==
"Go Imran Go" and "Ro Imran Ro" ("Cry Imran, Cry") is the counter slogan used by PML-N supporters for Imran Khan.

== See also ==
- Azadi March
- Inqilab March
- Gullu Butt
- List of political slogans
