= Inqilab March =

Political rally in Pakistan

Inqilab March انقلاب مارچ
- Date: 14 August 2014 – 21 October 2014 (2 months and 1 week)
- Location: Islamabad
- Caused by: Centralization, alleged corruption, Feudalism, the 2014 Lahore clash
- Goals: Electoral reform, Registering FIR against Model Town Massacre, election of local bodies, dismissal of government
- Methods: Protest march
- Status: Partially achieved

Parties
Pakistan Muslim League Nawaz	Pakistan Awami Tehreek and Tehreek-e-Insaaf

Lead figures
Nawaz Sharif; Shahbaz Sharif	Muhammad Tahir-ul-Qadri, Chaudhry Shujaat, Pervaiz Ellahi, Imran Khan leading Azadi March and Shaikh Rasheed

Arrests
- Arrested: PAT (25,000 workers); 4800 PTI workers

The Inqilab March (Arabic: انقلاب مارچ, romanized: Inqilāb Mārch, lit. 'Revolution March') was a public protest by the Pakistan Awami Tehreek (PAT), against the Pakistani government of Nawaz Sharif. It took place from August to September 2014.

In mid-August 2014, Islamic Scholar and political figure Muhammad Tahir-ul-Qadri led thousands of people, in hundreds of cars, buses, and trucks towards the federal capital, Islamabad, from the provincial capital, Lahore. Many of the protesters were his die-hard but peaceful and unarmed political workers and students from all parts of Pakistan. All of these peaceful workers were demanding the lodging/registering the First Information Report against the killers of Model Town Massacre that had been refused by the police. It was an incident when Punjab Police killed at least 14 workers including 2 pregnant women and injured more than 100 workers of PAT on their headquarters in Lahore on 14 June 2014 with straight fires. Police from more than dozen police stations in Lahore attacked the house of Dr Tahir ul Qadri's residence and the secretariate of Pakistan Awami Tehreek/Minhaj-ul-Quran with a huge number of policemen along with goons of the ruling party PMLN. They also demolished a lot of infrastructure and broke windows of vehicles there and looted shops in the vicinity. By the pressure generated by these Inqilab March participants the FIR was launched for Model Town Massacre by the intervention of the Army Chief of Pakistan General Raheel Sharif. The Inqilab (Revolution) march was also aimed at the bringing down of the mega-scale corrupt practices of the government, electoral reforms, fast and speedy justice, and facilitation of basic necessities of life to the poor unprivileged classes of Pakistan in the wake of looting the taxpayers' money and saving in offshore havens. The protesters were of the opinion that the rulers are not only looters but also killers of humanity because they leave no stone unturned to remain in power and suck every inch of national resources by means of their corrupt nature and practices. The march also demanded a change of system by reforms and law of the land using Article 62 and 63 of the constitution of Pakistan to hinder the entrance of unsuitable, illiterate and fake degree holders into the Parliament. They also demanded the restoration of Article 1 to 40 of the constitution of Pakistan which guarantees the basic human rights of the people of Pakistan which under the bad governance of the corrupt rulers have been subsided.

The march was ended by the sole decision of the party leaders of Pakistan Awami Tehreek (PAT).

== Background ==
In January 2013, Dr. Tahir-ul-Qadri led a major sit-in protest in Islamabad, calling for accountability measures to be implemented before the upcoming elections and advocating for the preservation of the state. This demonstration took place at the end of Asif Ali Zardari's presidency and just prior to the general elections. Dr. Qadri's protest was aimed at highlighting issues within the electoral system and the need for systemic reforms.

On 17 June 2014, a violent clash occurred between the Punjab Police and PAT activists resulting in the deaths of several protesters from police gunfire. Following the killings of his party workers, Dr Muhammad Tahir-ul-Qadri had been on a flight from Dubai airport to Islamabad airport where his supporters had gathered, however after the Emirates flight circulated above Islamabad the Pakistani authorities finally diverted the flight to Lahore Airport. The police fired tear gas at Qadri's supporters that had gathered at Islamabad airport. A stand-off ensued at Lahore airport where Qadri alleged that the Punjab government may try to harm upon leaving the aircraft. He demanded a military escort off the plane however this was met with the Governor of Punjab Choudhry Mohammad Sarwar's personal convoy taking him to his residence in Model Town, Lahore.

== Current situation ==
As of the end of September 2014, the Inqilab March is conducting sit-in protests with allied partner Imran Khan, Chairman and founder of Tehreek-e-Insaaf (PTI) and organizer of the 2014 Azadi march, in the capital of Pakistan, Islamabad, ongoing since 14 August 2014 (Pakistani Independence Day). After the announcement of the Azadi March, it was expected that Tahir-ul-Qadri (heretofore refusing to ally his own march with the Azadi March) allied the PTI's Azadi March with his own Inqilab March. This alliance between the two parties resulted in two parallel marches by Qadri and Imran Khan (with the goal of mutual protection in any civil crackdown).

== Informal PTI–PAT coalition ==
Imran Khan and Muhammad Tahir-ul-Qadri did not fully join their protest marches nor decline to support each other. On 10 August 2014, Qadri formally announced that his party's political march, the Inqilab March, would proceed parallel with PTI's Azadi march. The announcement of two parallel marches by parties in opposition gave rise to speculation that a coalition between PTI and PAT was possible. The chiefs of the two parties never clearly stipulated a formal coalition; but an informal agreement to support each other was achieved. On 11 August 2014, Qadri and Khan both announced that there would be two parallel marches, informally allied together for the dismissal of the government.

== Media coverage ==
Per news telecast in the different TV channels and published in the news papers, it was reported that Dr. Tahir-ul-Qadri led the Eid prayer at Islamabad's D-Chowk. The congregation was attended by Chief of PTI Imran Khan and other political leaders, including Raja Nasir Abbas Jafary of MWM. Animal sacrifies were also offered in the name of Allah following the Sunnah of Prophet Ibrahim and his son Prophet Ismail. Celebration of Eid at D-Chowk is itself unique in history but has also been censured by the rivalry.

== See also ==
- Long March, protests by the Pakistan Awami Tehreek in 2013
- Azadi March, by Pakistan Tehreek-e-Insaf and its transformation into Dharna alongside the Inqilab March Dharna.
- List of protests in the 21st century
