= League of the Physically Handicapped =

US 20th century disability rights organization

The League of the Physically Handicapped was an early 20th century disability rights organization in New York City. It was formed in May 1935 to protest discrimination by the Works Progress Administration (WPA).

The Home Relief Bureau of New York City stamped applications by disabled applicants with "PH", which stood for "physically handicapped". Marked as "unemployable", they were denied access to WPA-created jobs. To protest this, members of the League held a sit-in at that Home Relief Bureau for nine days beginning on May 29, 1935, and a weekend sit-in at the WPA headquarters, also in New York City, in June 1935. These actions eventually led to the creation of 1,500 jobs for physically disabled workers in New York City in 1936. The league had dissolved by 1938.
