= San Francisco Proposition N (2002) =

San Francisco ballot measure

Electoral results by supervisorial district.

Care Not Cash was a San Francisco ballot measure (Proposition N) approved by the voters in November 2002. Primarily sponsored by Gavin Newsom, then a San Francisco supervisor, it was designed to cut the money given in the General Assistance programs to homeless people in exchange for shelters and other forms of services. The major intent of this measure was to prevent the cash grants given to be used for purchasing drugs and alcohol, and to strongly encourage homeless people to enter shelters or housing and obtain counseling and other services.

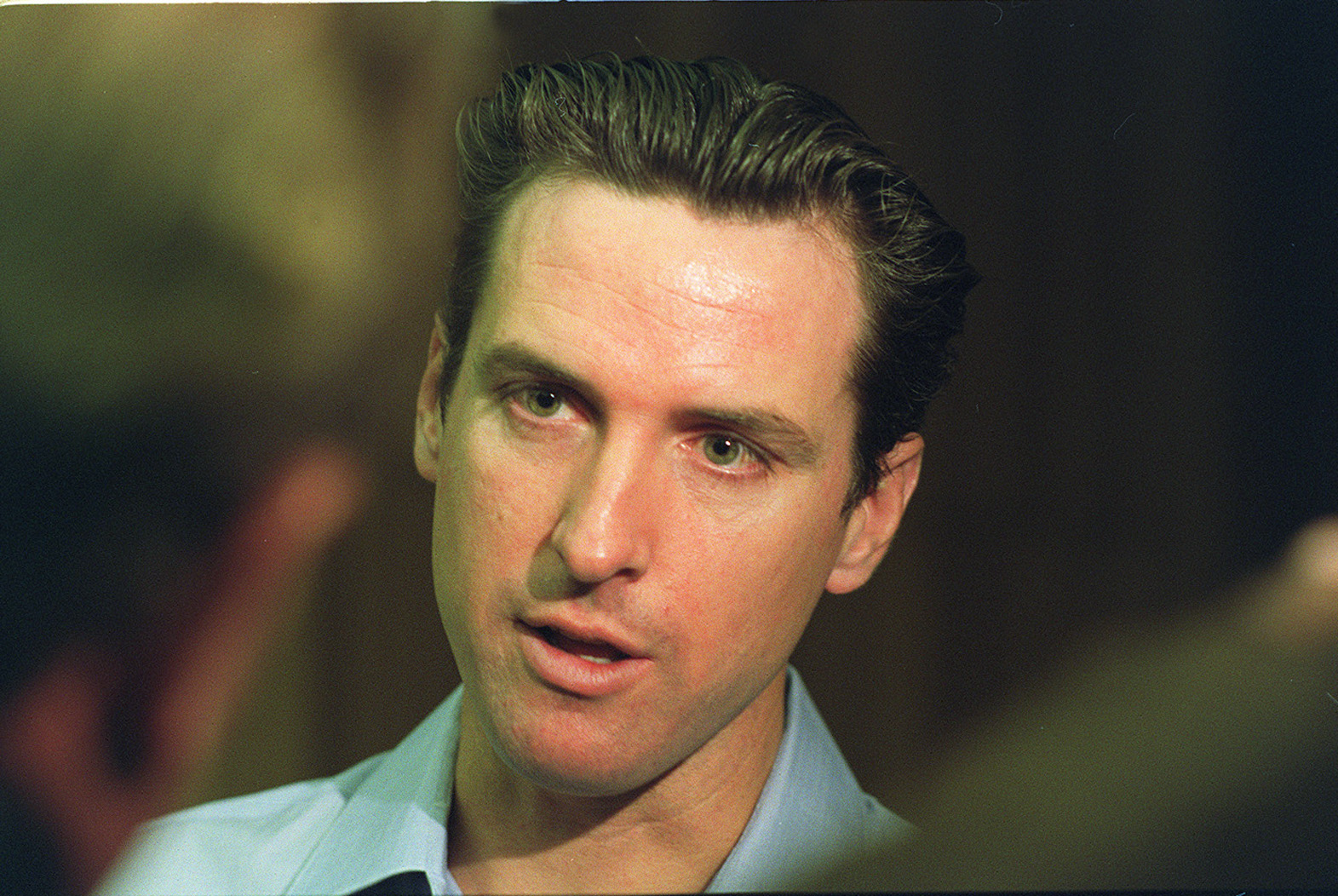
Gavin Newsom talks to the media about "Care Not Cash" in 2003.

Care Not Cash altered city welfare assistance to the approximately 3,000 homeless adults who received about $395 a month to $59 a month plus housing and food. According to the measure, if the services weren't available, the city couldn't reduce a homeless persons' aid. The idea behind Care Not Cash was to use the city's savings from cutting the welfare checks—an estimated $13 million a year —-- to set baseline funding for creating affordable housing, expanding shelters, and adding mental health and substance abuse treatment.

Later, an amendment called "Real housing, real care", was voted upon by the Board of Supervisors. It was created to ensure that the "Care" element of "Care not Cash" was in place; that is, to mandate a certain level of housing and services to be available before the city cut General Assistance payments.

== Election results ==
Proposition N passed with 59.77% out of 209,869 votes cast.

== Controversy ==
Care Not Cash caused a significant amount of controversy in San Francisco. The name was seen as a euphemism, and critics complained that the quality of care provided was not equivalent to the cash. The major debates, however, were in the many underlying issues that Care not Cash brought up, including:

- The "right" to be paid to be homeless. This issue was raised by some like Angela Alioto, who criticized the provision of the Care not Cash law that states if the homeless person refused "care," he or she would not be given "cash." Most supporters of the law did not see that as a weakness in the law, but rather as the fundamental point of the legislation, to strongly discourage people from homelessness if shelters and other services were possible.
- The quality of the shelter system. Both certain supporters of Care not Cash and certain critics were very negative towards the prevailing homeless shelter system in San Francisco at the time, criticizing it not only for being of low quality and unsafe, but also as a source of cronyism and graft.
- Many critics, such as Alioto, point out that the premise of the law does not affect the main class of homeless, the so-called "hardcore homeless," who Alioto claims are by and large so mentally unstable as to not even know how to collect General Assistance in the first place.

Additionally, Eugene Dong MD, JD, an Associate Professor of Cardiac Surgery Emeritus at Stanford University, conducted an independent investigation of the cost of the program and proclaimed, "[the] program just does not add up." Dong said that the city claims to have used $14,000,000 to house just 1,000 people, suggesting the city spent $14,000.00 per housed recipient per year, or $1,226.00 per month, rather than the $410.00, which was the maximum monthly benefit. Dong believes that difference, or 70 percent of the county welfare fund, went "directly to the hotel owners in the form of cash payments and capital improvements that they would not otherwise have received." Dong also said that the CNC Program did not actually decrease the numbers of homeless, since in the same year, the numbers of homeless in the surrounding communities swelled commensurately.

== Progress ==
A study released February 9, 2005, indicated that the number of County Adult Assistance Programs (CAAP) residents who declared themselves to be homeless residents of San Francisco had decreased from 2,497 to 679 since implementation of Care Not Cash in May 2004. As of January 2007, the caseload had decreased further to 333, although Mayor Newsom acknowledged in a radio interview that two or three new homeless persons come to San Francisco for each homeless person that gets off the streets.

Update 2016 San Francisco report, following 1,820 homeless adults for eight years from 2007 to 2015, showed that before entering the program living on their own, costs averaged $21,000/person due to urgent emergency care, jail time, and behavioral health services. And after entering supportive housing, costs initially more than doubled for ongoing housing, medical care, and mental health by 2011, but then started decreasing yearly since by 56% in 2015.

== See also ==
- Welfare in California
