= Gullu Butt =

Pakistani vandal

Shahid Aziz
- Born: Lahore, Pakistan
- Died: 24 March 2024
- Other name: Gullu Butt
- Occupation: Unknown
- Years active: 2014
- Status: Sentenced
- Motive: 2014 Lahore clash
- Criminal charges: Vandalism
- Penalty: 11 years
- Capture status: Jailed

Shahid Aziz (Urdu: شاہد عزیز), alias Gullu Butt (Urdu: گلو بٹ), was the name of one of the vandals responsible for the violent nature of the altercation between police and Minhaj-ul-Quran workers in the 2014 Lahore clash in Pakistan. Initially blame for the violence was placed on the NGO workers. News footage then revealed an individual using a club to smash the windscreens of many parked vehicles in full view of dozens of police officers who looked on but did not intervene; he was identified as Gullu Butt, an activist of the ruling PML-N against whom the PAT was protesting. According to several media reports Gullu Butt had been invited by the Punjab police to disrupt what had been a peaceful movement, but PML-N's Saad Rafique, then-Federal Minister for Railways, announced that Gullu Butt did not have any connection with the government. He was arrested but released shortly after on bail; an incident that prompted heavy condemnation of the ruling party by the PAT and PTI.

He died on 24 March 2024 after having been bedridden for several months because of a prolonged illness.

The word Gullu associated with Gullu Butt has been given a meaning of "disruptive behavior of someone enjoying (good or bad) backing of the ruling/powerful segments of society". Syed Shamim Azam, a linguist from Lahore, wrote to Oxford Dictionary to add the word Gullu in their upcoming version of the dictionary which is going to be available in Pakistan and India, to which the publishers replied if "[T]he term achieves enormous currency with a wide audience in a much shorter space of time, and people expect to find the new 'high-profile' word in their dictionaries, it sure is included in the dictionary".

== Conviction ==
An Anti-Terrorism Court (ATC) sentenced Gullu Butt to 11 years in prison in 2014. The court also enforced a fine of Rs 100,000 on Butt. Butt's counsel said they would appeal the decision in the Lahore High Court (LHC), adding that his client did not commit an offence calling for such severe punishment.
