= GNG Computers =

British computer refurbishment company

GNG Computers ltd.
- Trade name: Charles Computers (eBay)
- Founded: 2009
- Founder: Gawain and Grace Ng
- Headquarters: Huntingdon, Cambridgeshire, United Kingdom
- Products: I.T Equipment
- Number of employees: 18

GNG Computers is a British computer refurbishment company located in Huntingdon, Cambridgeshire. GNG Computers was founded in 2009 by Gawain and Grace Ng, and originally started as an eBay based company trading under the name of Charles Computers. As of 18 April 2016 the company announced the redundancy of its staff and the closure of trading.

== Trading ==
=== eBay ===
Originally started in 2009, GNG Computers first utilized the popular online auction site for trading with customers, selling under the name Charles Computers. They are currently rated on eBay with a 99.9% customer satisfaction rate and an eBay feedback score of over 77,000 points.

=== Webstore ===
During September 2014, GNG unveiled their own webstore hosted on the GNG website. The new webstore is currently being stocked with many of the products from their eBay store, along with a few unique items that are exclusive to their webstore including bulk trading.

=== Business to Business ===
GNG also trade bulk quantity to businesses, either through their webstore or direct negotiation via phone call or email. A newsletter is also utilized to advertise the latest prices and stock quantity to other businesses, however general public are also invited to subscribe as special offers are also sent.

== Local Repairs ==
GNG Computers local repair service (known as GNG Local) began in August 2014, and repair a multitude of electronic devices spanning PCs, smartphones, laptops and tablets.
