= General Assistance =

American term for a type of welfare

General Assistance (also known as General Relief) is a term used in the United States to denote welfare programs that benefit adults without dependents (single persons, or less commonly, childless married couples) as opposed to families with children, who receive assistance from the federal program formerly known as Aid to Families with Dependent Children, and, since 1996, officially known as Temporary Assistance for Needy Families.

During the Great Depression, the principal welfare program known as Home Relief—established as part of the New Deal—made no distinction as to the presence or absence of children in a needy household, but in 1935 a distinct program for such households with children was spun off from the main program.

In later years, individual states were given broad discretion as to how much in benefits—and indeed, any benefits—need be paid to adults without dependent children; and the trend since the 1980s has been for states to sharply curtail, and even eliminate, such aid. As of 2005, only two states—New Jersey and Utah—still paid cash welfare benefits to childless adults deemed "able-bodied" (many other states do allow such payments to be made if a disability is demonstrated). In any event, the person(s) seeking General Assistance must first apply for any other programs—state or federal—for which alternate eligibility may or may not exist; only if all such applications are denied is the applicant then permitted to receive General Assistance benefits, which usually include food stamps, and often, assistance in paying for rental housing.

In some states, General Assistance programs are not universal, and the policies of different counties or cities therein may differ widely. California is such a state; San Francisco once paid the most generous benefits in the state, but these were drastically reduced after Gavin Newsom was elected mayor of that city in 2003, on a controversial platform known as "Care Not Cash".

Many jurisdictions use the alternate name "General Relief", including a large number of California counties (among them Los Angeles County), as well as the states of Iowa and Virginia. Alaska calls its program "General Relief Assistance".

== California ==
Since 1933, California law has required counties to provide relief to the poor, including health care services and general assistance. The California Welfare and Institutions Code provides that:

Every county and every city and county shall relieve and support all incompetent, poor, indigent persons, and those incapacitated by age, disease, or accident, lawfully resident therein, when such persons are not supported and relieved by their relatives or friends, by their own means, or by state hospitals or other state or private institutions.

It has been said that the "provision of general assistance is inconsistent, fragmented, and widely differentiated", with aid ranging from $160 per month in Santa Barbara County to $360 in neighboring Ventura County. Los Angeles County has the largest number of general assistance recipients in California and gives aid of $221 per month.

California has provided some form of general assistance since the mid-1800s, and much of the language can be traced back to the Pauper Act of 1901. San Francisco Proposition N of 2002, colloquially known as Care Not Cash, was a San Francisco ballot measure sponsored by Gavin Newsom designed to cut the money given in the General Assistance programs to homeless people in exchange for shelters and other forms of services.

== See also ==
- Unemployment benefit
- Federal assistance in the United States
