= 2014 Lahore clash =

Clashes in Lahore

- Date: 17 June 2014
- Location: Model Town, Lahore, Pakistan; 31°29′0″N 74°18′32.5″E
- Caused by: Police-led anti-encroachment operation
- Methods: Protest against operation
- Result: Deaths of protesters, 5 policemen arrested

Parties
Government of Punjab; Punjab Police	Pakistan Awami Tehreek activists; Minhaj-ul-Quran activists

Lead figures
Shehbaz Sharif; Rana Sanaullah Khan; Police; SHO Seikh Amir Saleem (under arrest); And others; Gullu Butt	Pakistan Awami Tehreek workers

Number
300+	700+

Casualties
- Deaths: 14
- Injuries: 100+
- Arrested: 53+

The Model Town operation, more commonly known as the Model Town tragedy or the Lahore massacre (Urdu: سانحہ ماڈل ٹاؤن), or simply Lahore incident, was a violent clash that ensued between the Punjab Police and Pakistan Awami Tehreek activists on 17 June 2014 resulting in several protesters being killed by the police gunfire. Five police officers remain under arrest. The standoff lasted for almost 11 hours when the police's anti-encroachment squad launched an operation to remove the barriers from the road leading to the offices of Minhaj-ul-Quran and the residence of PAT founder Muhammad Tahir-ul-Qadri in Model Town, Lahore, even though police officials were given a court order by PAT leaders, stating "due to terrorism issue place security barriers in front of Minhaj-ul-Quran and the residence of PAT founder Dr.Qadri."

The incident was broadcast live on various local news channels and there were conflicting accounts of how the standoff began. Police claimed that they were attacked by people inside the PAT secretariat, a claim that is denied by party chief Qadri. In the live footage broadcast on television, the policemen were shown firing assault rifles and lobbing tear gas canisters at the protesting masses while the protesters threw stones at the police.

Qadri strongly condemned the attack and called it the worst form of state terrorism. Qadri vowed to avenge the deaths of his political workers by bringing about a revolution that would hasten the end of the rule of prime minister Nawaz Sharif and his brother Shahbaz Sharif.

Following the incident, Qadri′s importance grew in Pakistani politics where he had "otherwise been regarded by most observers as posing little threat to the government". Where some analysts considered Qadri a "political non-entity" before the incident, others expressed concern that the Pakistan Muslim League (N) (PML-N) government reacted "disproportionately and aggressively" in this matter, "shooting itself in the foot" and feeling "'insecure' with the attention that Qadri [had] managed to attract".

== Background ==
On 16 June 2014, the Pakistan Awami Tehreek founder and chief Muhammad Tahir-ul-Qadri warned the government of "serious consequences" if anything was to happen to him on his return to Pakistan on 23 June 2014. For some time, Qadri had been amassing the support of political parties in the opposition to form a grand alliance against the incumbent Nawaz Sharif administration. Qadri had successfully rallied for and acquired the support of political stalwarts like Pakistan Muslim League (Q) president Chaudhry Shujaat Hussain and Awami Muslim League chief Sheikh Rasheed in forming a "grand alliance" against the government.

== The incident ==
At around 1am PKT on 17 June 2014, the Punjab Police launched an anti-encroachment operation to remove barriers outside the offices of Minhaj-ul-Quran International and Qadri's residence in the Model Town suburb in Lahore. The police reached the PAT headquarters in a large contingent and demanded the party workers to remove the barricades which they claimed were illegal. The raid was untimely in contrast to the routine morning raids the police often conducts in similar cases.

The PAT workers insisted that the barricades were legal and that they had been set up four years ago to protect Qadri's home and office when he issued a decree against the Taliban. Nevertheless, the police carried on with their operation to demolish the Jersey barriers with bulldozers prompting the PAT workers and activists to resist the police efforts by starting a protest against the police action.

=== London Plan ===
There are serious concerns of civil society of Pakistan that the whole plot was designed by some ex- government officials though Dr. Qadri and his party denied these charges. The liberal political parties also insisted that the whole event was drafted in London sometimes referred as London Plan.

=== Live media coverage ===
After the initial protests, the police retreated for a while, only to return in greater numbers at 5 am. In the meantime, PAT workers had also managed to amass a crowd of supporters and called in the local media. The protesters started pelting the police squad with stones to protest against the removal of barriers. The violent resistance from the protesters led the police to retreat once again. Throughout the ensuing clash, reporters and journalists managed to cover the scenes in live broadcasts aired across various national news channels for the rest of the night and the following day.

=== Negotiations with PAT ===
Upon gauging the violent reaction from the protesting crowds, DCO Muhammad Usman and DIG Operations Rana Jabbar negotiated with PAT general-secretary Khurram Nawaz Gandapur and chief security officer (CSO) Altaf Shah. Shah was adamant that he and his party workers would not let the police remove the barriers. According to the Capital City Police Officer (CCPO) Chaudhry Shafique Ahmad, there were two rounds of negotiations between the party officials and the police where the party workers were asked to remove the hurdles on their own.

When the negotiations failed to bring fruit, the police returned for a third time with a 100-strong squad at 9:30 am to forcefully remove the barriers. They were met with fierce retaliation yet again as the protesters pelted the police.

=== Violent measures ===
The police returned for a fourth time at 11:20 am. This time, the force was led in groups commanded by seven-to-eight SPs where some put focus on firing directly into the crowd while others used various tactics to disperse the crowds, like firing tear gas and charging with batons. With the police firing weapons directly into the crowd of protesters, 8 protesters (including 2 women one of whom was pregnant) died at the scene while around 80 protesters were gravely injured.

=== Anarchy ===
Amidst all the chaos and police brutality, media cameras were able to capture an unknown vandal smashing cars. It was later identified that the "handlebar-mustached vandal", Gullu Butt was a known police tout and had been a known activist of the Pakistan Muslim League (N) (PML-N), the party in government. Butt brandished a club he used to smash cars and was also heard chanting slogans. In one footage, Butt was also seen leading the law enforcement officers' charge against the protesters. Soon afterwards, Model Town SP Tariq Aziz was seen chatting and hugging Butt.

Later in an editorial written for the Daily Times, Pakistan Tehreek-e-Insaf information secretary Andleeb Abbas called Butt a "henchman" of the PML-N government and accused the state police as having "aided, abetted and applauded [the vandal] with absolutely no inhibition for the atrocious crimes that he was committing".

=== Police claims ===
The police claimed that the Minhaj-ul-Quran administration had deployed a private militia that was manning the barriers and had effectively converted the residential area into a no-go area. Qadri later said that the number of arrests was understated by the police as more than 200 of his party workers were missing and unaccounted for.

On the complaint of a sub-inspector, the Faisal Town Police later registered a case against more than 3000 PAT workers under sections 7ATA, 302, 324, 353, 148/149 of the Pakistan Penal Code. The police FIR also formally nominated Hussain Mohiuddin, the son of the PAT chief Qadri, as the main accused.

== Formal inquisition ==
Immediately following the incident, the Punjab chief minister Shahbaz Sharif ordered a judicial inquiry into the events that unfolded on the day. He said he was "saddened over the killings" and would not hesitate to resign if held responsible for the negligence. He assured that he had already constituted a judicial commission to probe the incident.

Sharif denied any knowledge of the police operation and claimed complete ignorance of the bloodshed. His opponents ridiculed him for not knowing about the incident despite the live broadcast that covered the "bloody episode that continued for hours". Upon watching the TV footage, Sharif ordered for the immediate arrest of the notorious vandal Gullu Butt. Sharif also asked the federal minister for Planning and Development Ahsan Iqbal was to brief the house on the Lahore killings.

=== Tampering evidence ===
On 19 June 2014, it was reported that several police officials went to a hospital where the wounded were being treated and altered the medico-legal certificates of injured police officials to show "fake bullet injuries" in order to justify their claim that PAT workers also shot at the police. Qadri accused the provincial government of tampering with the evidence in the hospital records and denied that his party workers had any arms at all. He also asked the police to produce the confiscated weapons before the media in order to prove their claim.

=== Qadri rejects judicial commission ===
The PAT chief Qadri said that the reason for the police action was to "threaten him and his party" before his arrival in Pakistan on 23 June 2014. He openly rejected the judicial commission and said that the judicial commission could not independently conduct an impartial investigation as long as the PML-N is in government. He expressed concerns that the police may use bribery and scare tactics to coerce false eyewitness accounts in their favour. Later, while addressing a press conference on 21 June 2014 via video-link from Canada, Qadri urged for an investigation team comprising representatives of the ISI, MI and IB, and a judicial commission of three supreme court judges to probe the incident.

=== Rana Sanaullah justifies police action ===
In justifying the police operation, the Punjab law minister Rana Sanaullah Khan told the press that "for a person who consistently defies the constitution and the democratic system, Tahir-ul-Qadri had been trying to bulldoze the Pakistani democracy by spreading anarchy". He blamed the religious leader of inciting hatred by asking innocent civilians to take oaths on the Quran to amass against the government. Tahir-ul-Qadri later vehemently denied such claims and called this justification for the operation as being preposterous.

Rana Sanaullah also justified the operation by claiming that the police were able to identify several armed men and weapons at the Minhaj-ul-Quran offices, a claim refuted by several PAT officials. After the operation ended, no police official was immediately held responsible for mishandling and criminal negligence.

=== Ministers removed from posts ===
In a press conference at the PML-N Central Secretariat in Lahore on 21 June 2014, Punjab chief minister Shahbaz Sharif said that he had decided to remove the Punjab Minister for Law and Parliamentary Affairs Rana Sanaullah Khan (who has been restored by Punjab Government on 29 May 2015) and Principal Secretary to the Chief Minister Dr Toqueer Shah from their posts to ensure fair and transparent investigation into the incident.

== Reaction of the opposition parties ==
Following the incident, major parties in opposition including the Pakistan Tehreek-e-Insaf (PTI) and Pakistan Muslim League (Q; PML-Q) boycotted the Punjab Assembly in protest.

The Human Rights Watch strongly condemned the 'lethal force' by the Police and demanded full investigation. "The Pakistani authorities need to explain why police officers found it necessary to fire live ammunition directly into a crowd of protesters throwing rocks," said Brad Adams, Asia director at Human Rights Watch. "There are a lot of dead and wounded people in Lahore today, and no clear reason why."

The Human Rights Commission of Pakistan (HRCP) has strongly condemned the police action at the Tahirul Qadri Secretariat.

- Pakistan Peoples Party condemned the attack. The opposition leader Syed Khursheed Shah said that the events were a "conspiracy against democracy allegedly hatched by Shahbaz Sharif". He condemned the use of force against Tahir-ul-Qadri's supporters.
- Pakistan Tehreek-e-Insaf also condemned the attack and the party's central president Javed Hashmi asked the government to stop the killings of innocent people immediately. PTI's Punjab president Ejaz Chaudhry demanded an apology from prime minister Nawaz Sharif and the chief minister Shahbaz Sharif while stating that the "government was responsible for [the] incident" and that "there was no justification for such an incident".
- Muttahida Qaumi Movement condemned the police action and announced a day of mourning for the victims. Party leader Farooq Sattar called the police operation "undemocratic and barbaric". MQM's deputy convener Khalid Maqbool Siddiqi stated that "the protest of the PAT workers was peaceful".

An all parties conference (APC) of political and religious parties except PMLN, PPP, and Awami National Party (ANP) called by PAT head Dr Qadri on 29 June 2014, condemned the killings and demanded an investigation by Supreme Court's three-member bench. The APC reiterated the demand for Chief Minister's resignation and arrest of the Punjab's to top police officers. The PMLN's central and provincial governments responded to the demands that the investigations are already underway. The federal information minister, Pervez Rasheed, maintained that the parties participating in the APC are trying to "keep their politics alive" as they have no representation in the parliament.

== See also ==
- Sahiwal killings
- 2010 Abbottabad police killings
- List of cases of law enforcement brutality in Pakistan
