= Pakistan Awami Tehreek =

Coordinates: 31.482925°N 74.3088682°E

Pakistan Awami Tehreek پاکستان عوامی تحريک Pakistan People's Movement
- Abbreviation: PAT
- Leader: Muhammad Tahir-ul-Qadri
- President: Qazi Zahid Hussain
- First Secretary: Arif Mahmood Chaudhary
- Vice-President: Raja Zahid Mahmood
- Secretary General: Khurram Nawaz Gandapur
- Founder: Muhammad Tahir-ul-Qadri
- Founded: 25 May 1989; 37 years ago
- Headquarters: Lahore, Punjab, Pakistan
- Ideology: Moderate Islamism; Islamic Democratic Socialism; Centrism
- Political position: Centrism; Fiscal: Centre-left; Social: Centre-right
- Colors: Red, White, Green

Election symbol
- Motorcycle

Party flag

Website
- www.pat.com.pk

The Pakistan Awami Tehreek commonly known as PAT (Urdu: پاکستان عوامی تحريک) (Pakistan People's Movement) is a political party in Pakistan, founded by Muhammad Tahir-ul-Qadri, took part in general elections in 1990 and 2002.

== Manifesto ==
Pakistan Awami Tehreek presented a detailed 186-page manifesto by the name of 'putting people first', which outlined seven priorities:

1. Education
2. Economy
3. Poverty
4. Health
5. Justice
6. Peace
7. Technology

Moreover, practical course of action was spelled out to revitalize 32 departments of the country.

== Political history ==
PAT chief Dr Muhammad Tahir-ul-Qadri announced the establishment of PAT on 25 May 1989 in a public meeting at Mochi Gate, Lahore.

From 1989 to 1993, Qadri worked as an opposition leader to highlight the government's mistakes, and to propose changes in political, educational, and economical fields. In 1991, PAT and Tehrik-e-Nifas-e-Fiqh-e-Jafria (Moosavi Faction) signed a 'Communique of Unity' to promote social and religious harmony. In another move, PAT, for the first time in the political history of Pakistan, introduced an idea of "working relationship" between the three national political forces, PAT, TNFJ, and Tehreek-e-Istaqlal.

In 1992, Qadri put forward an extensive working plan for interest-free banking in Pakistan, covering both national and international banking; it was met with widespread recognition and approval, and had supporters even among industrial and banking professionals.

=== Elections 1990 ===
PAT fielded candidates throughout the country in the general elections held one year after its establishment. The party failed to win any seats, but received enough votes to demonstrate support and to spur promotion across the country.

=== Elections 1993 ===
The PAT leadership tried to unite religious and political leaders prior to the 1993 elections, to create an alternative vision that could be offered to the nation, but failed to make headway. In view of this sharp political divide, the General Council of PAT concluded that the present electoral system would render progress towards their desired vision for the Pakistan impossible. Consequently, it boycotted the political process and turned to promoting awareness and support among working-class Pakistanis.

PAT launched an extensive campaign at the national level, under which hundreds of educational institutions were set up.

=== Pakistan Awami Ittehad ===
The PML-N government, in its second stint from 1997 to 1999, started victimization of its political opponents. Politically motivated cases were registered against them. The government pushed through legislation to make Prime Minister Nawaz Sharif all-powerful and unaccountable. The watershed in this regard was passage of Shariat Bill on 8 August 1998. 17 political parties got together on the platform of Pakistan Awami Ittehad under the leadership of PAT chief Dr Muhammad Tahir-ul-Qadri to ward off political victimization. Martyr of democracy, Shaheed Mohtarama Benazir Bhutto's Pakistan People's Party joined the political alliance as a leading party. The political forces initially converged on the agenda of 'Go Nawaz Go' but later on they issued 14-point Islamic Social Order on 18 March 1998 for establishment of Islamic welfare state. However, this political alliance could not last long and was disbanded in 1999.

=== Elections 2002 ===
PAT took part in the second general elections in 2002. Only PAT chief Dr Muhammad Tahir-ul-Qadri was able to get elected to the National Assembly from NA-127 in Lahore. The PAT distributed party tickets among its workers belonging to poor and middle classes on the basis of competence and integrity but they could not win elections due to their inability to fulfill 'demands' of Pakistani politics.

=== Resignation from National Assembly ===
On 5 October 2004, PAT chief Dr Muhammad Tahir-ul-Qadri resigned from his National Assembly seat in protest against Pervez Musharraf's wearing of two caps namely the Chief of Army Staff and the President of Pakistan, which was the first resignation in Pakistan's parliamentary history. The 85-page resignation statement issued by Dr Tahir-ul-Qadri was presented in the National Assembly as a national document, which exposed the conspiracies and secret power play. Following his resignation, Dr Tahir-ul-Qadri gave his workers and chapters of his party the target of mass awareness campaign and settled abroad to resume his research work.

On 29 November 2004, Qadri announced his resignation as a Member of the National Assembly. Explaining his resignation he cited the President's broken promises, political corruption and blackmailing, the undemocratic system, institutional inabilities, failures of accountability, the sabotage of National Assembly, global issues including Pakistan-US relations, international terrorism and US global domination, Israeli aggression, the Iraq war, Islamabad-Delhi relations including the Kashmir dispute and Pakistan-Afghanistan relations. His 41-page resignation statement is available online to read.

=== Elections 2008 ===
The General Council of Pakistan Awami Tehreek described general elections 2008 as lacking in fairness and transparency and suffering from pre-poll rigging. It thus decided to boycott the polls.

In a January 2011 address to a meeting of MQI's Majlis-e-Shura in Lahore, Qadri stated that the current political system of Pakistan protects a 3% ruling elite, while the 97%, who are mainly poor people, have effectively become slaves of this corrupt political system.

On 6 October 2011, the Supreme Court of Pakistan ordered action on Karachi violence after the Chief Justice of Pakistan Iftikhar Muhammad Chaudhry took a suo motu notice in response to the appeal of Dr Tahir ul Qadri.

=== Long March 2013 ===
Dr Muhammad Tahir-ul-Qadri led a historic long march from Lahore to Islamabad on 13 January to highlight the importance and need of electoral reforms ahead of general elections 2013. The peaceful sit-in, which was staged in front of Parliament House, came to an end on a written agreement between the PAT and the government of the day with the latter committing itself to introduce reforms in electoral system and holding elections in accordance with legal and constitutional demands.

=== Elections 2013 ===
Despite inking a written agreement with a commitment to introduce reforms in electoral system and hold general elections in line with legal and constitutional requirements, the government reneged on its agreement. Elections 2013 were presided over by an Election Commission, which was composed unconstitutionally. Hence the PAT General Council decided to boycott general elections 2013.

All political parties irrespective of whether they won or lost elections said with one voice that Dr Tahir-ul-Qadri was spot on when he dilated on the outcome of elections well before they were even held. PTI chairman Imran Khan repeated this sentence of Dr Tahir-ul-Qadri in his first address at the floor of Parliament.

=== Lahore Clash ===
On 17 June 2014, a violent clash ensued between the Punjab Police and PAT activists resulting in the deaths of several unarmed protesters by police gunfire. The standoff lasted for almost 11 hours when the police′s anti-encroachment squad launched an operation to remove the barriers from the street in front of the offices of Minhaj-ul-Quran and the PAT founder Qadri′s residence in Model Town, Lahore.

=== Unrest March 2014 ===
PAT chief Dr Muhammad Tahir-ul-Qadri led historic long march from Lahore to Islamabad on 14 August 2014 to seek justice for the martyrs of Model Town tragedy and send the government home which came into being in violation of Articles 62, 63 and 218 of the Constitution. The sit-in continued for 70 days in front of Parliament House. On the intervention of Pakistan Army Chief General Raheel Sharif, FIR of Model Town tragedy was registered against nine key figures of the present government including the Prime Minister and the Chief Minister. The revolution march sit-in came to an end on 21 October 2014.

== See also ==
- Category:Pakistan Awami Tehreek politicians
- Inqilab March
