= Kamboja =

Kamboja may refer to:

- Kambojas, a southeastern Iranian people mentioned in the Indo-Aryan sources
  - Kamboja Kingdom, mentioned in the ancient Indian epic Mahabharata
    - Sudakshina, a king of the Kamboja Kingdom in the epic
    - Prapaksha Kamboja, a prince of the Kamboja Kingdom in the epic
  - Parama Kamboja Kingdom, another kingdom mentioned in the epics
  - Dvārakā–Kamboja route, a route in ancient India
- Upamanyu Kamboja or Upamanyu, a sage of Hinduism
  - Aupamanyava Kamboja, his son
- Kamboja Pala dynasty, a medieval dynasty in Bengal
- Kamboj, a community of South Asia
- Kamboj (Chhimba clan), a clan of the Chhimba caste in India
- Prostylotermes kamboja, an extinct termite genus of India

== See also ==
- Kamboi, ancient port town of Gujarat, India
- Kampuchea (disambiguation)
- Kanbawza (disambiguation)
- Cambyses (disambiguation)
- Kambu (disambiguation)
- Sage Kambhoja, a sage in the ancient Indian epic Ramayana
- Kambuja-raja-lakshmi, a queen of the Chenla kingdom in present-day Cambodia
- Kambhoji, a raga in Indian classical music
- Kambhoji (film), a 2017 Indian film
- Cambodia
  - Names of Cambodia
- Khmer Empire
- Kumbhoj, a town in Kolhapur district, Maharashtra, India
- Cambyses I, (Old Persian: Kambūjia) father of Cyrus the Great
- Cambyses II of Persia, (Old Persian: Kambūjia) son of Cyrus the Great
- Cambojiidae, an order of ctenophore (marine animals)
- Plumeria, also known as the kamboja flower in Indonesia
