= Kambiz =

Kambiz can refer to

- Kambiz (given name)
- Kambiz, Iran, a village in Razavi Khorasan Province
- Cambyses (disambiguation)
