= Ganbu =

Ganbu may refer to:

- Gàn bù (Chinese: 干部, literally "cadre, official, officer, manager"), a category of persons in managing positions according to the ranking of the Civil Service of the People's Republic of China
- Ganbu (Korean: 간부, "cadre, officer, executive members")
  - A category of personnel in military of South Korea in ranks of hasa and above, see "Byeong"
  - A category of senior corporate management, see Corporate title#Japan and South Korea
- Songzan Ganbu, or Songtsen Gampo, the 33rd Tibetan king and founder of the Tibetan Empire

== See also ==
- Genbu (disambiguation)
- Kambu (disambiguation)
