= Angelina Jolie =

American actress (born 1975)

Angelina Jolie DCMG
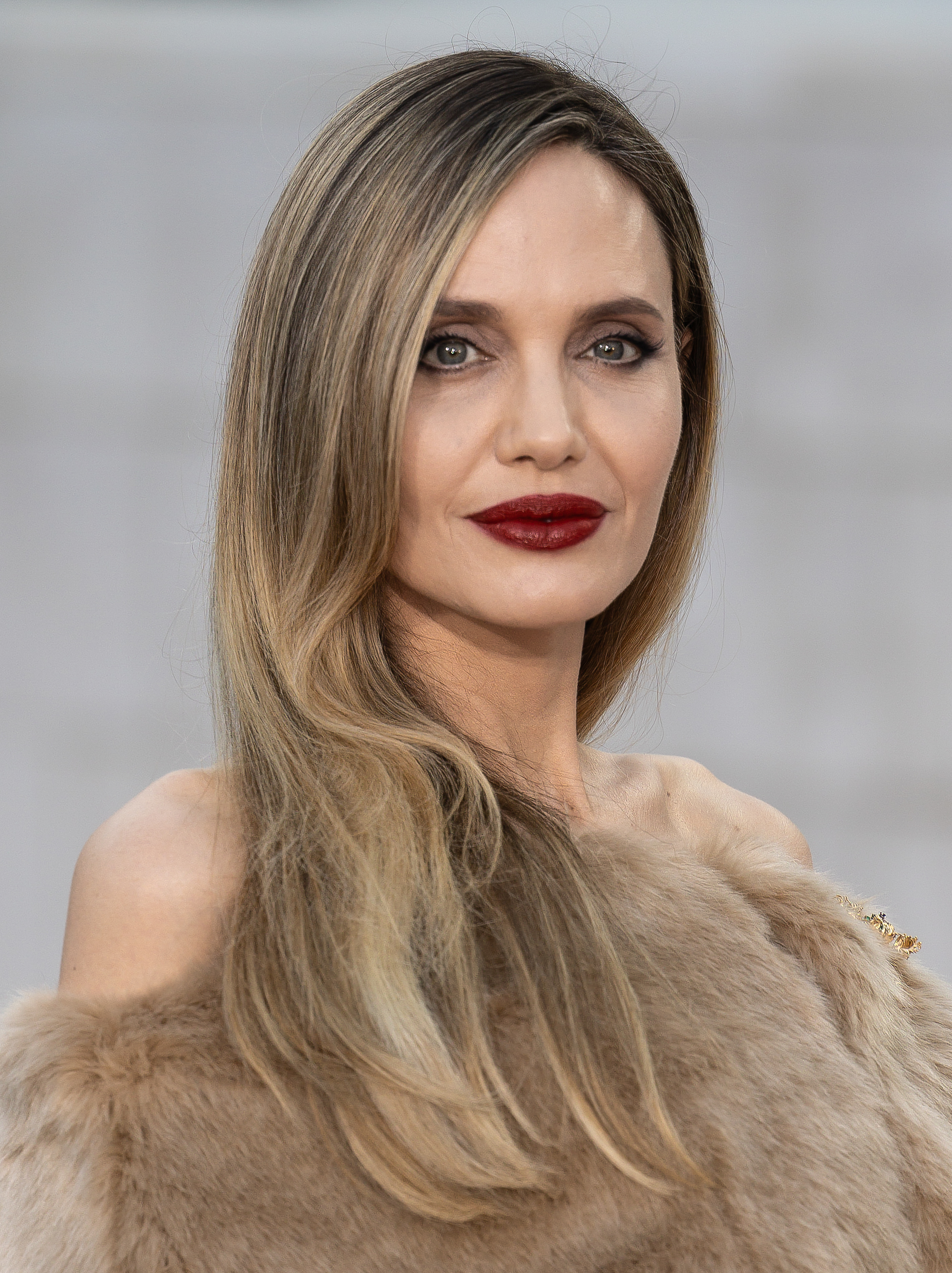
- Jolie in 2024
- Born: Angelina Jolie Voight; June 4, 1975 (age 51); Los Angeles, California, U.S.
- Other name: Angelina Jolie Pitt (Note: Sometimes hyphenated as Jolie-Pitt.)
- Citizenship: U.S.; Cambodia (Note: Jolie was granted citizenship by Cambodia in 2005 in honor of her humanitarian work in the country.)
- Occupations: Actress; filmmaker; humanitarian
- Years active: 1982–present
- Works: Full list
- Spouses: Jonny Lee Miller (m. 1996; div. 2000); Billy Bob Thornton (m. 2000; div. 2003); Brad Pitt (m. 2014; div. 2019)
- Children: 6
- Parents: Jon Voight; Marcheline Bertrand
- Relatives: James Haven (brother); Barry Voight (uncle); Chip Taylor (uncle)
- Awards: Full list

Special Envoy to the United Nations High Commissioner for Refugees
- In office April 17, 2012 – December 17, 2022
- High Commissioner: António Guterres (2012–2015); Filippo Grandi (2016–2022)
- Preceded by: Office established

Angelina Jolie (Note: Pronunciation: /dʒoʊˈliː/, joh-LEE) (born Angelina Jolie Voight, (Note: Pronunciation: /vɔɪt/, VOYT) June 4, 1975) is an American actress, filmmaker, and humanitarian. She is the recipient of numerous accolades, including an Academy Award, a Tony Award and three Golden Globe Awards. Films in which she has appeared have grossed over $6.9 billion worldwide. She has been named Hollywood's highest-paid actress multiple times.

Jolie made her screen debut as a child alongside her father, Jon Voight, in Lookin' to Get Out (1982). Her film career began in earnest a decade later with the low-budget production Cyborg 2 (1993), followed by her first leading role in Hackers (1995). After starring in the television films George Wallace (1997) and Gia (1998), Jolie won the Academy Award for Best Supporting Actress for the 1999 drama Girl, Interrupted. Her portrayal of the titular heroine in Lara Croft: Tomb Raider (2001) established her as a leading lady. Jolie's commercial success continued with roles in the action films Mr. & Mrs. Smith (2005), Wanted (2008), and Salt (2010), as well as in the fantasy films Maleficent (2014) and Maleficent: Mistress of Evil (2019) and the Marvel Cinematic Universe superhero film Eternals (2021).

Jolie gained critical praise for her dramatic performances in A Mighty Heart (2007), Changeling (2008), which earned her a nomination for the Academy Award for Best Actress, and Maria (2024). She also had voice roles in the animated films Shark Tale (2004) and the Kung Fu Panda franchise (2008–2016). As a filmmaker, Jolie directed and wrote the war dramas In the Land of Blood and Honey (2011), Unbroken (2014), First They Killed My Father (2017) and Without Blood (2024). She also produced the musical The Outsiders (2024), which won the Tony Award for Best Musical.

Jolie is known for her humanitarian efforts. The causes she promotes include conservation, education, and women's rights. She has been noted for her advocacy on behalf of refugees as a special envoy for the United Nations high commissioner for refugees. She has undertaken field missions to refugee camps and war zones worldwide. In addition to receiving a Jean Hersholt Humanitarian Award among other honors, Jolie was made an honorary Dame Commander of the Order of St Michael and St George (DCMG). As a public figure, Jolie has been cited as one of the most powerful and influential people in the American entertainment industry. She has been cited as the world's most beautiful woman by various publications. Her personal life, including her relationships and health, has been the subject of widespread attention. Jolie is divorced from actors Jonny Lee Miller, Billy Bob Thornton, and Brad Pitt. She has six children with Pitt.

== Early life and background ==
Angelina Jolie Voight was born on June 4, 1975, at Cedars-Sinai Hospital in Los Angeles, California, to actors Jon Voight and Marcheline Bertrand. She is the sister of actor James Haven, and the niece of singer Chip Taylor and geologist and volcanologist Barry Voight. Her godparents are actors Jacqueline Bisset and Maximilian Schell. On her father's side, Jolie is of British and Slovak descent, while on her mother's side, she is of Dutch and Canadian ancestry. She is a distant relative of former Dutch finance minister and prime minister Wim Kok. Jolie has claimed to have distant Indigenous (Iroquois) ancestry through her Canadian mother. However, her father says Jolie is "not seriously Iroquois", saying it is something he and Bertrand made up to make Bertrand seem more "exotic".

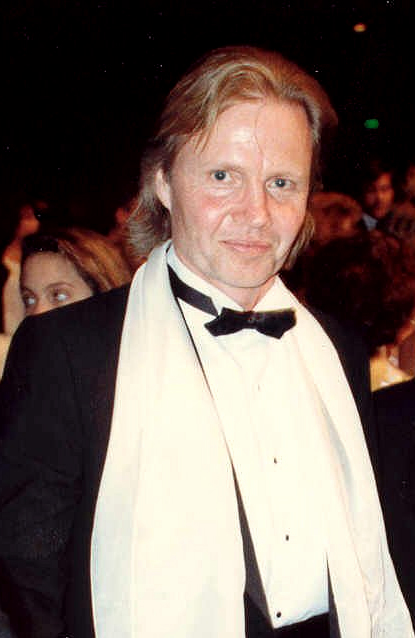
Jolie's father, actor Jon Voight, attending the 60th Academy Awards in 1988

Following her parents' separation in 1976, she and her brother lived with their mother, who had abandoned her acting ambitions to focus on raising her children. Jolie's mother raised her as a Catholic but did not require her to go to church. As a child, she often watched films with her mother and it was this, rather than her father's successful career, that inspired her interest in acting, though she had a bit part in Voight's Lookin' to Get Out (1982) at age seven. When Jolie was six years old, Bertrand and her live-in partner, filmmaker Bill Day, moved the family to Palisades, New York; they returned to Los Angeles five years later. Jolie then decided she wanted to act and enrolled at the Lee Strasberg Theatre Institute, where she trained for two years and appeared in several stage productions.

Jolie first attended Beverly Hills High School, where she felt isolated among the children of some of the area's affluent families because her mother had a more modest income. She was teased by other students, who targeted her for being extremely thin and for wearing glasses and braces. Her early attempts at modeling, at her mother's insistence, proved unsuccessful. She transferred to Moreno High School, an alternative school, where she became a "punk outsider", wearing all-black clothing, going out moshing, and engaging in knife play with her live-in boyfriend. She dropped out of her acting classes and aspired to become a funeral director, taking at-home courses on embalming. At age 16, after the relationship had ended, Jolie graduated from high school and rented her own apartment before returning to theater studies, though in 2004 she referred to this period with the observation, "I am still at heart—and always will be—just a punk kid with tattoos."

As a teenager, Jolie found it difficult to emotionally connect with other people, and as a result she self-harmed, later commenting, "For some reason, the ritual of having cut myself and feeling the pain, maybe feeling alive, feeling some kind of release, it was somehow therapeutic to me." She also struggled with insomnia and an eating disorder and began using drugs; by age 20, she had used "just about every drug possible," particularly heroin. Jolie had episodes of depression and planned to commit suicide twice—at age 19 and again at 22, when she attempted to hire a hitman to kill her. When she was 24, she experienced a nervous breakdown and was admitted for 72 hours to UCLA Medical Center's psychiatric ward. Two years later, after adopting her first child, Jolie found stability, later stating, "I knew once I committed to Maddox, I would never be self-destructive again."

Jolie has had a lifelong dysfunctional relationship with her father, which began when Voight left the family when she was less than a year old. She has said that from then on their time together was sporadic and usually carried out in front of the press. They reconciled when they appeared together in Lara Croft: Tomb Raider (2001), but their relationship again deteriorated. Jolie petitioned the court to legally remove her surname, Voight, in favor of her middle name, which she had long used as a stage name; the name change was granted on September 12, 2002. Voight then went public with their estrangement during an appearance on Access Hollywood, in which he claimed Jolie had "serious mental problems." At that point, her mother and brother also broke off contact with him. Jolie and Voight did not speak for six-and-a-half years, eventually rebuilding their relationship in the wake of Bertrand's death from ovarian cancer on January 27, 2007, and they both went public with their reconciliation three years later.

== Career ==
=== Early work (1991–1997) ===
Jolie committed to acting professionally at age sixteen, but initially found it difficult to pass auditions, often being told that her demeanor was "too dark." She appeared in five of her brother's student films, made while he attended the USC School of Cinema-Television, as well as in several music videos, such as those for Lenny Kravitz's "Stand by My Woman" (1991), Antonello Venditti's "Alta marea" (1991), The Lemonheads's "It's About Time" (1993), and Meat Loaf's "Rock and Roll Dreams Come Through" (1993). In 1993, she also appeared on the cover of the Widespread Panic album Everyday. Jolie then learned from her father by noticing his method of observing people to become like them. Their relationship was less strained during this time, with Jolie realizing that they were both "drama queens".

Jolie began her professional film career in 1993, when she played her first leading role in the direct-to-video science-fiction sequel Cyborg 2, as a near-human robot designed for corporate espionage and assassination. She was so disappointed with the film that she did not audition again for a year. Following a supporting role in the independent film Without Evidence (1995), she starred in her first major studio film, Hackers (1995). The New York Times critic Janet Maslin wrote that Jolie's character "stands out ... because she scowls even more sourly than [her co-stars] and is that rare female hacker who sits intently at her keyboard in a see-through top." Hackers failed to make a profit at the box office, but developed a cult following after its video release. The role in Hackers is considered Jolie's breakthrough.

After starring in the modern-day Romeo and Juliet adaptation Love Is All There Is (1996), Jolie appeared in the road movie Mojave Moon (1996). In Foxfire (1996) she played Legs, a drifter who unites four teenage girls against a teacher who has sexually harassed them. Jack Mathews of the Los Angeles Times wrote of her performance, "It took a lot of hogwash to develop this character, but Jolie, Jon Voight's knockout daughter, has the presence to overcome the stereotype. Though the story is narrated by Maddy, Legs is the subject and the catalyst."

In 1997, Jolie starred with David Duchovny in the thriller Playing God, set in the Los Angeles underworld. The film was not well received by critics; Chicago Sun-Times critic Roger Ebert wrote that Jolie "finds a certain warmth in a kind of role that is usually hard and aggressive; she seems too nice to be [a mobster's] girlfriend, and maybe she is." Her next work, as a frontierswoman in the CBS miniseries True Women (1997), was even less successful; writing for The Philadelphia Inquirer, Robert Strauss dismissed her as "horrid, a fourth-rate Scarlett O'Hara" who relies on "gnashed teeth and overly pouted lips." Jolie also starred in the music video for the Rolling Stones song "Anybody Seen My Baby?" as a stripper who leaves mid-performance to wander New York City.

=== Rise to prominence (1998–2000) ===
Jolie's career prospects improved after she won a Golden Globe Award for her performance in TNT's George Wallace (1997), a film about segregationist Alabama Governor and presidential candidate George Wallace, played by Gary Sinise. Jolie portrayed Wallace's second wife, Cornelia Wallace, a performance Lee Winfrey of The Philadelphia Inquirer considered a highlight of the film. George Wallace was well received by critics, and Jolie received a nomination for a Primetime Emmy Award for Outstanding Supporting Actress in a Miniseries or a Movie for her performance.

Jolie portrayed supermodel Gia Carangi in HBO's Gia (1998). The television film chronicles the destruction of Carangi's life and career as a result of her addiction to heroin, and her decline and death from AIDS in the mid-1980s. Vanessa Vance of Reel.com retrospectively noted, "Jolie gained wide recognition for her role as the titular Gia, and it's easy to see why. Jolie is fierce in her portrayal—filling the part with nerve, charm, and desperation—and her role in this film is quite possibly the most beautiful train wreck ever filmed." For the second consecutive year, Jolie won a Golden Globe Award and received an Emmy Award nomination. She also won her first Screen Actors Guild Award.

In accordance with Lee Strasberg's method acting, Jolie preferred to stay in character in between scenes during many of her early films. While shooting Gia, she told her husband, Jonny Lee Miller, that she would not be able to phone him: "I'd tell him: 'I'm alone; I'm dying; I'm gay; I'm not going to see you for weeks.'" After Gia wrapped, she briefly gave up acting, because she felt that she had "nothing else to give." She separated from Miller and moved to New York, where she took night classes at New York University to study directing and screenwriting. Encouraged by her Golden Globe Award win for George Wallace and the positive critical reception of Gia, Jolie resumed her career.

Following the previously filmed gangster film Hell's Kitchen (1998), Jolie returned to the screen in Playing by Heart (1998), part of an ensemble cast that included Sean Connery, Gillian Anderson, and Ryan Phillippe. The film received predominantly positive reviews, and Jolie was praised in particular; San Francisco Chronicle critic Peter Stack wrote, "Jolie, working through an overwritten part, is a sensation as the desperate club crawler learning truths about what she's willing to gamble." She won the Breakthrough Performance Award from the National Board of Review.

In 1999, Jolie starred in the comedy-drama Pushing Tin, alongside John Cusack, Billy Bob Thornton, and Cate Blanchett. The film met with mixed reception from critics, and Jolie's character—Thornton's seductive wife—was particularly criticized; writing for The Washington Post, Desson Howe dismissed her as "a completely ludicrous writer's creation of a free-spirited woman who weeps over hibiscus plants that die, wears lots of turquoise rings and gets real lonely when Russell spends entire nights away from home." Jolie then co-starred with Denzel Washington in The Bone Collector (1999), playing a police officer who reluctantly helps Washington's quadriplegic detective track down a serial killer. The film grossed $151.5 million worldwide, but was critically unsuccessful. Terry Lawson of the Detroit Free Press concluded, "Jolie, while always delicious to look at, is simply and woefully miscast."

Jolie is emerging as one of the great wild spirits of current movies, a loose cannon who somehow has deadly aim.

— Chicago Sun-Times critic Roger Ebert on Jolie's performance in Girl, Interrupted (1999)

Jolie next took the supporting role of Lisa, a sociopathic patient in a psychiatric hospital, in Girl, Interrupted (1999), an adaptation of Susanna Kaysen's 1993 memoir. For Variety, Emanuel Levy deemed her "excellent as the flamboyant, irresponsible girl who turns out to be far more instrumental than the doctors in Susanna's rehabilitation." Jolie won the Golden Globe Award for Best Supporting Actress – Motion Picture, the Screen Actors Guild Award for Outstanding Performance by a Female Actor in a Supporting Role and the Academy Award for Best Supporting Actress for her performance in the film.

In 2000, Jolie appeared in her first summer blockbuster, Gone in 60 Seconds, which became her highest-grossing film to that point, earning $237.2 million internationally. She had a minor role as the mechanic ex-girlfriend of a car thief played by Nicolas Cage; The Washington Post writer Stephen Hunter criticized that "all she does in this movie is stand around, cooling down, modeling those fleshy, pulsating muscle-tubes that nest so provocatively around her teeth." Jolie later explained that the film had been a welcome relief after her emotionally demanding role in Girl, Interrupted.

=== Worldwide recognition (2001–2004) ===
While initially recognized for critical acting achievements, Jolie solidified her status as an international superstar through the box office success of Lara Croft: Tomb Raider (2001). An adaptation of the popular Tomb Raider video games, the film required her to learn an English accent and undergo extensive martial arts training to play the archaeologist-adventurer Lara Croft. Although the film generated mostly negative reviews, Jolie was generally praised for her physical performance; Newsday's John Anderson commented, "Jolie makes the title character a virtual icon of female competence and coolth." The film was an international hit, earning $274.7 million worldwide, and launched her global reputation as a female action star.

Jolie next starred opposite Antonio Banderas as his mail-order bride in Original Sin (2001), the first of a string of films that were poorly received by critics and audiences alike. The New York Times critic Elvis Mitchell questioned Jolie's decision to follow her Oscar-winning performance with "soft-core nonsense." The romantic comedy Life or Something Like It (2002), though equally unsuccessful, marked an unusual choice for Jolie. Salon magazine's Allen Barra considered her ambitious newscaster character a rare attempt at playing a conventional women's role, noting that her performance "doesn't get off the ground until a scene where she goes punk and leads a group of striking bus workers in singing 'Satisfaction'". Despite her lack of box office success, Jolie remained in demand as an actress; in 2002, she established herself among Hollywood's highest-paid actresses, earning $10–15 million per film for the next five years.

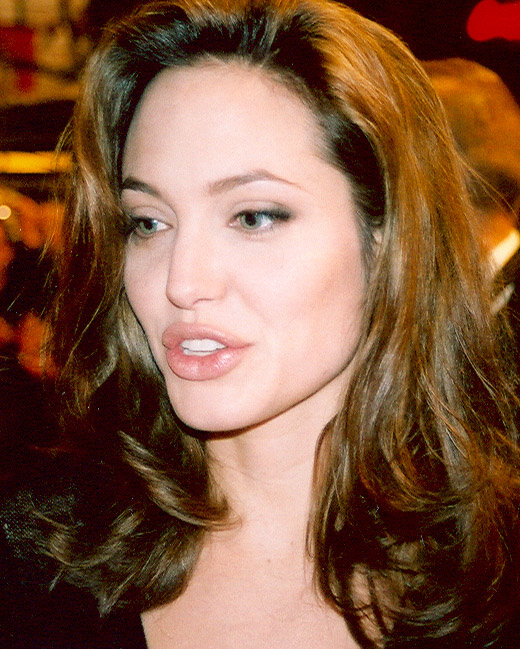
Jolie at the German premiere of Alexander in 2004

Jolie reprised her role as Lara Croft in Lara Croft: Tomb Raider – The Cradle of Life (2003), which was not as lucrative as the original, earning $156.5 million at the international box office. She also starred in the music video for Korn's "Did My Time", which was used to promote the sequel. Her next film was Beyond Borders (2003), in which she portrayed a socialite who joins an aid worker played by Clive Owen. Though unsuccessful with audiences, the film stands as the first of several passion projects Jolie has made to bring attention to humanitarian causes. Beyond Borders was a critical failure; Kenneth Turan of the Los Angeles Times acknowledged Jolie's ability to "bring electricity and believability to roles," but wrote that "the limbo of a hybrid character, a badly written cardboard person in a fly-infested, blood-and-guts world, completely defeats her."

In 2004, Jolie appeared in four films. She first starred in the thriller Taking Lives as an FBI profiler summoned to help Montreal law enforcement hunt down a serial killer. The film received mixed reviews; The Hollywood Reporter critic Kirk Honeycutt concluded, "Jolie plays a role that definitely feels like something she has already done, but she does add an unmistakable dash of excitement and glamour." Jolie made a brief appearance as a fighter pilot in Sky Captain and the World of Tomorrow, a science fiction adventure shot entirely with actors in front of a bluescreen, and voiced her first family film, the DreamWorks animation Shark Tale. Her supporting role as Queen Olympias in Oliver Stone's Alexander, about Alexander the Great, was met with mixed reception, particularly concerning her Slavic accent. Commercially, the film failed in North America, which Stone attributed to disapproval of the depiction of Alexander's bisexuality, but it succeeded internationally, grossing $167.3 million.

=== Established actress (2005–2010) ===
In 2005, Jolie returned to major box office success with the action-comedy Mr. & Mrs. Smith, in which she starred opposite Brad Pitt as a bored married couple who find out that they are both secret assassins. The film received mixed reviews, but was generally lauded for the chemistry between the two leads; Star Tribune critic Colin Covert noted, "While the story feels haphazard, the movie gets by on gregarious charm, galloping energy and the stars' thermonuclear screen chemistry." With box office takings of $478.2 million worldwide, Mr. & Mrs. Smith was the seventh-highest grossing picture of the year and remained Jolie's highest-grossing live-action film for the next decade.

Following a supporting role as the neglected wife of a CIA officer in Robert De Niro's The Good Shepherd (2006), Jolie starred as Mariane Pearl in the documentary-style drama A Mighty Heart (2007). Based on Pearl's 2003 memoir, the film chronicles the kidnapping and murder of her husband, The Wall Street Journal reporter Daniel Pearl, in Pakistan. Although the multiracial Pearl had personally chosen Jolie for the role, the casting drew racial criticism and accusations of blackface. The resulting performance was widely praised; Ray Bennett of The Hollywood Reporter described it as "well-measured and moving," played "with respect and a firm grasp on a difficult accent." She received nominations for the Golden Globe Award and the Screen Actors Guild Award. Jolie also played Grendel's mother in the epic Beowulf (2007), created through motion capture. The film was critically and commercially well-received, earning $196.4 million worldwide.

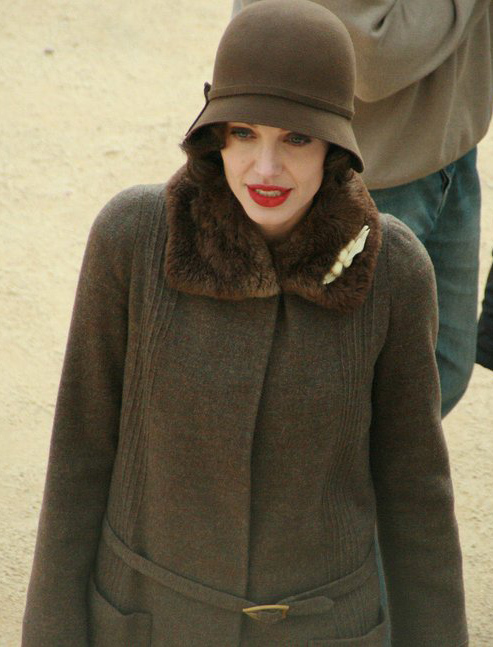
Jolie as Christine Collins on the set of Changeling in 2007

In 2008, Jolie was the highest-paid actress, earning $15–$20 million per film. While other actresses had taken salary cuts during the time, Jolie's perceived box office appeal allowed her to command as much as $20 million plus a percentage. She starred alongside James McAvoy and Morgan Freeman in the action film Wanted (2008), which proved an international success, earning $341.4 million worldwide. The film received predominantly favorable reviews; writing for The New York Times, Manohla Dargis noted that Jolie was "perfectly cast as a super-scary, seemingly amoral assassin," adding that "she cuts the kind of disciplinarian figure who can bring boys of all ages to their knees or at least into their theater seats."

Jolie next took the lead role in Clint Eastwood's drama Changeling (2008). Chicago Tribune critic Michael Phillips noted, "Jolie really shines in the calm before the storm, the scenes when one patronizing male authority figure after another belittles her at their peril." She received nominations for a Golden Globe Award, a Screen Actors Guild Award, the BAFTA Award for Best Actress in a Leading Role, and the Academy Award for Best Actress. Jolie also voiced Tigress in the DreamWorks Kung Fu Panda film series.

After her mother's death in 2007, Jolie appeared in fewer films, later explaining that her motivation to be an actress had stemmed from her mother's acting ambitions. Her first film in two years was the 2010 thriller Salt, in which she starred as a CIA agent who goes on the run after she is accused of being a KGB sleeper agent. Originally written as a male character with Tom Cruise attached to star, agent Salt underwent a gender change after a Columbia Pictures executive suggested Jolie for the role. With revenues of $293.5 million, Salt became an international success. The film received generally positive reviews, with Jolie's performance in particular earning praise. Empire critic William Thomas remarked, "When it comes to selling incredible, crazy, death-defying antics, Jolie has few peers in the action business."

Jolie starred opposite Johnny Depp in the thriller The Tourist (2010). The film was a critical failure. Roger Ebert defended Jolie's performance, stating that she "does her darndest" and "plays her femme fatale with flat-out, drop-dead sexuality." Despite commercially underperforming in the US, the film succeeded at the international box office, cementing Jolie's appeal to international audiences. She received a Golden Globe Award for Best Actress in a Motion Picture – Comedy or Musical nomination for her performance, which prompted speculation that it had been given merely to ensure her high-profile presence at the awards ceremony.

=== Expansion to directing (2011–2017) ===
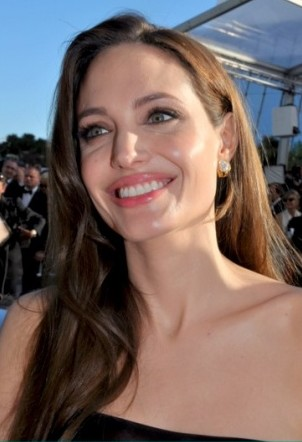
Jolie at the 2011 Cannes Film Festival

After directing the documentary A Place in Time (2007), which was distributed through the National Education Association, Jolie made her feature directorial debut with In the Land of Blood and Honey (2011), a love story between a Serb soldier and a Bosniak prisoner, set during the 1992–95 Bosnian War. She conceived the film to rekindle attention for the survivors, after twice visiting Bosnia and Herzegovina in her role as a UNHCR Goodwill Ambassador. To ensure authenticity, she cast only actors from the former Yugoslavia—including stars Goran Kostić and Zana Marjanović—and incorporated their wartime experiences into her screenplay. Upon release, the film received mixed reviews; Todd McCarthy of The Hollywood Reporter wrote, "Jolie deserves significant credit for creating such a powerfully oppressive atmosphere and staging the ghastly events so credibly, even if it is these very strengths that will make people not want to watch what's onscreen." The film was nominated for a Golden Globe Award for Best Foreign Language Film, and Jolie was named an honorary citizen of Sarajevo for raising awareness of the war.

After a three-and-a-half-year absence from the screen, Jolie starred in Maleficent (2014), a live-action re-imagining of Disney's 1959 animation Sleeping Beauty. Critical reception was mixed, but Jolie's performance in the titular role was singled out for praise; The Hollywood Reporter critic Sherri Linden found her to be the "heart and soul" of the film, adding that she "doesn't chew the estimable scenery in Maleficent—she infuses it, wielding a magnetic and effortless power." In its opening weekend, Maleficent earned nearly $70 million at the North American box office and over $100 million in other markets, marking Jolie's appeal to audiences of all demographics in both action and fantasy films, genres usually dominated by male actors. The film went on to gross $757.8 million worldwide, becoming the fourth-highest-grossing film of the year and Jolie's highest-grossing film ever.

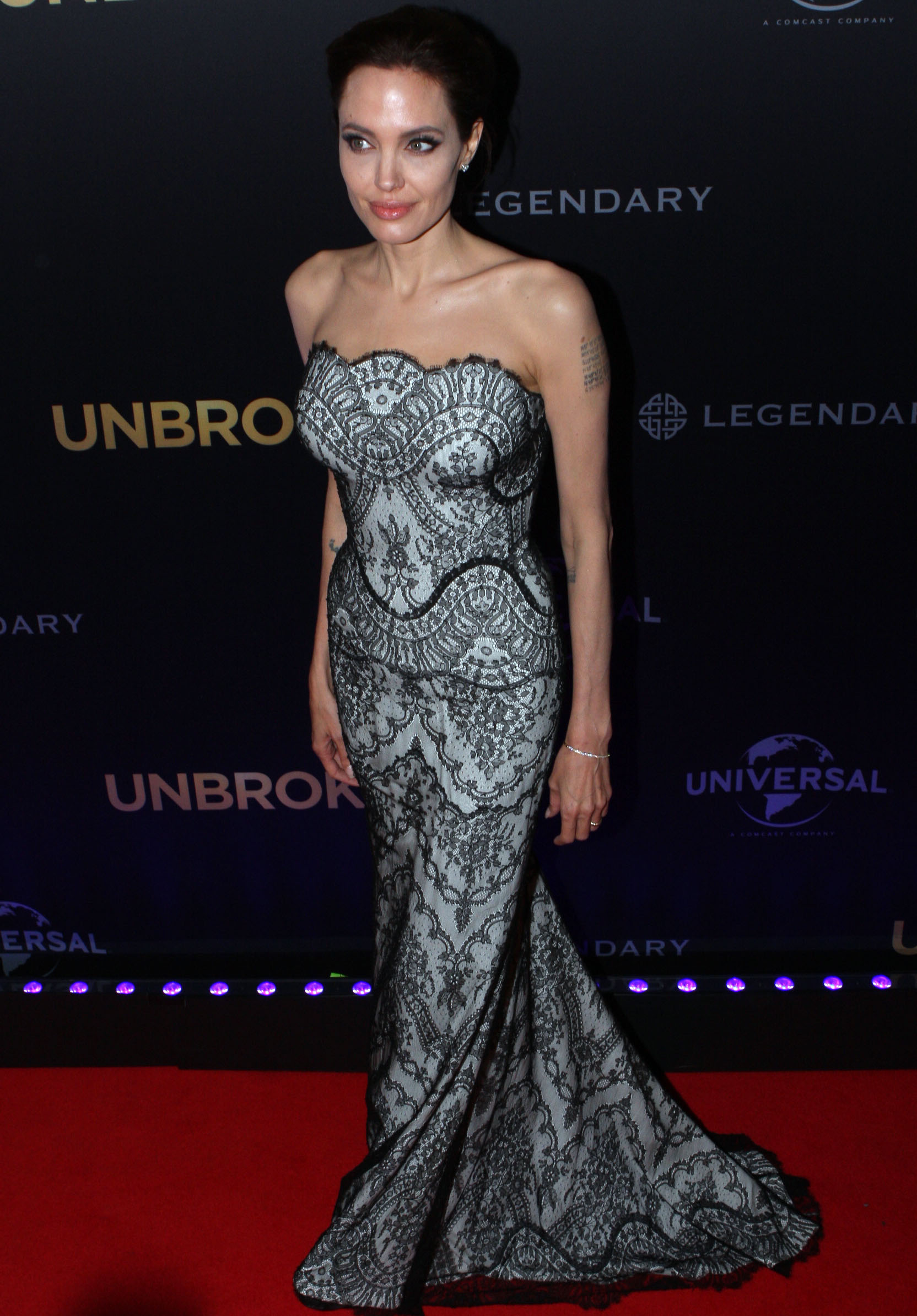
Jolie at the Unbroken world premiere in 2014

Jolie next completed her second directorial venture, Unbroken (2014), a film about Louis Zamperini (1917–2014), a former Olympic track star and World War II soldier who survived a plane crash and spent two years in a Japanese prisoner-of-war camp. She also served as producer under her Jolie Pas banner. Based on Laura Hillenbrand's book Unbroken: A World War II Story of Survival, Resilience, and Redemption, the film was scripted by the Coen brothers and starred Jack O'Connell. After a positive early reception, Unbroken was considered a likely Best Picture and Best Director contender, but it ultimately received mixed reviews and little award recognition, though it was named one of the best films of the year by the National Board of Review and the American Film Institute. Variety magazine's Justin Chang noted the film's "impeccable craftsmanship and sober restraint", but deemed it "an extraordinary story told in dutiful, unexceptional terms." Financially, Unbroken was successful at the box office worldwide.

Jolie's next directorial effort was the marital drama By the Sea (2015), in which she starred opposite her husband, Brad Pitt, marking their first collaboration since 2005's Mr. & Mrs. Smith. Based on her screenplay, the film was a deeply personal project for Jolie, who drew inspiration from her own mother's life. Critics, however, dismissed it as a "vanity project", as part of an overall poor reception. Writing for The Washington Post, Stephanie Merry noted its dearth of genuine emotion, stating, "By the Sea is dazzlingly gorgeous, as are its stars. But peeling back layer upon layer of exquisite ennui reveals nothing but emptiness, sprinkled with stilted sentiments." Despite starring two of Hollywood's leading actors, the film received only a limited release.

As Jolie preferred to dedicate herself to her humanitarian work, her cinematic output remained infrequent. First They Killed My Father (2017), a drama set during Cambodia's Khmer Rouge era, again enabled her to combine both interests. In addition to directing the film, she co-wrote the screenplay with her longtime friend Loung Ung, whose memoirs about the regime's child labor camps served as its source material. Intended primarily for a Cambodian audience, the film was produced directly for Netflix, which allowed for the use of an exclusively Khmer cast and script. Labeling Jolie as a "skilled and sensitive filmmaker", Rafer Guzmán of Newsday commended her for "convincingly depict[ing] the illogical hell of the Khmer Rouge era". It received nominations for the Golden Globe Award for Best Foreign Language Film and BAFTA Award for Best Film Not in the English Language.

=== Limited work and varying critical reception (2019–present) ===
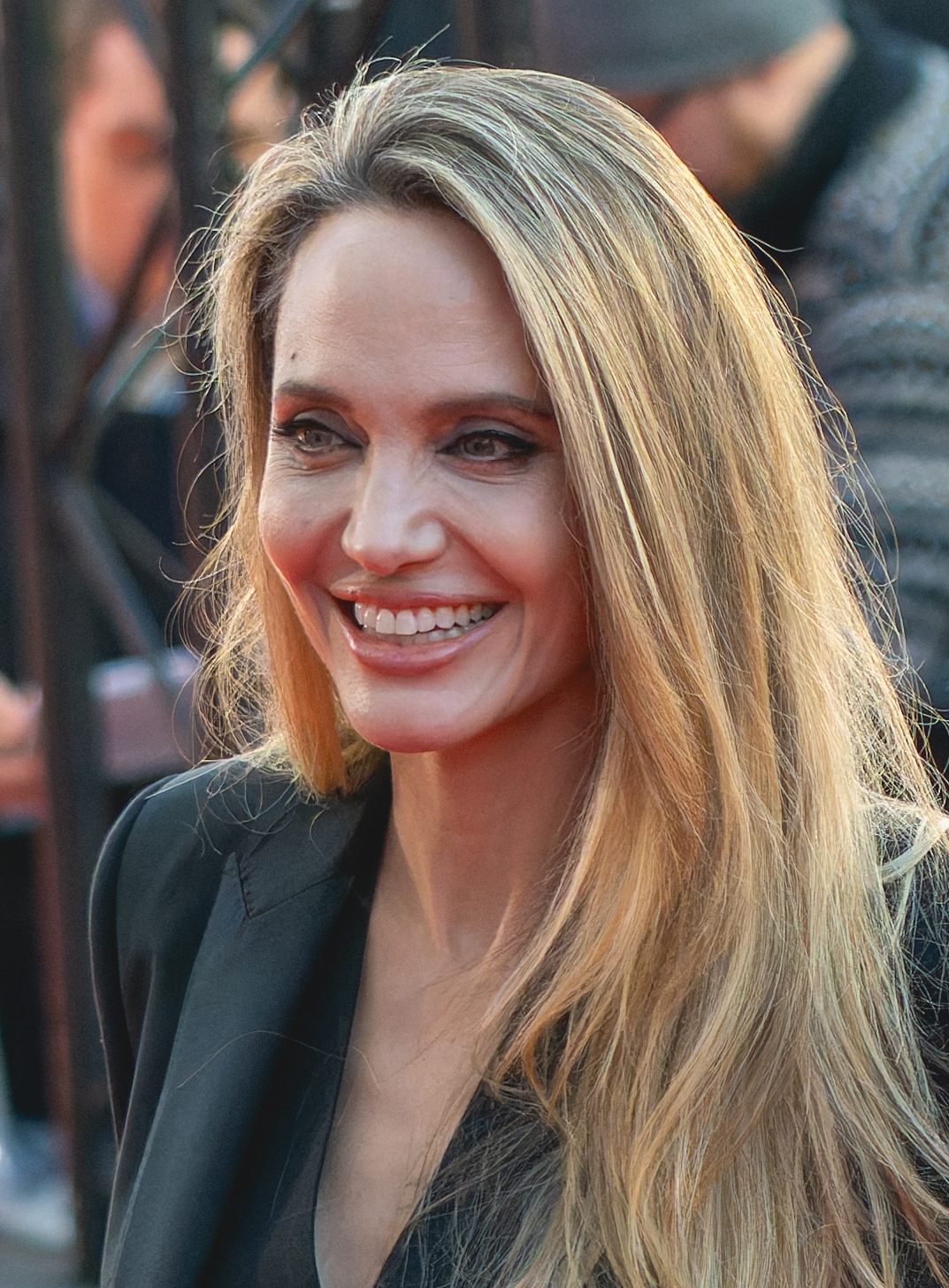
Jolie in 2024

Jolie reprised the role of Maleficent in the Disney fantasy sequel Maleficent: Mistress of Evil (2019), which received mixed reviews from critics but performed moderately well commercially, with a global gross of $490 million. The following year, she appeared alongside David Oyelowo as grieving parents to the title characters of Alice in Wonderland and Peter Pan in the fantasy film Come Away. Jolie starred as a smokejumper in Taylor Sheridan's action thriller Those Who Wish Me Dead. The film was released in May 2021, garnering moderate reviews. The Independent's Clarisse Loughrey wrote Jolie's "bare-knuckled performance ... easily outclasses the film that contains it". Jolie next played Thena, a warrior with post-traumatic stress disorder, in the Marvel Cinematic Universe superhero film Eternals. Released in November 2021, the film generated divergent responses from audiences and critics. Reviewing the film for The Washington Post, Ann Hornaday highlighted the "touching naivete" in Jolie's portrayal.

Jolie was a producer on the musical The Outsiders after it transferred to Broadway in 2024, and won the Tony Award for Best Musical. She wrote, produced and directed the 2024 war drama Without Blood, based on the novel by Alessandro Baricco, starring Salma Hayek and Demián Bichir. Jolie also starred in Pablo Larraín's biographical film about the final days of opera singer Maria Callas, titled Maria, which premiered at the 81st Venice International Film Festival. Terming it a "career-best performance", Tomris Laffly of RogerEbert.com opined, "In a queenly performance of poise and mystique, Angelina Jolie plays Callas with an ethereal presence, grasping the intense grief of the once-in-a-generation singer who's been losing her voice." She received another Golden Globe nomination for Best Actress for her performance.

== Public image ==
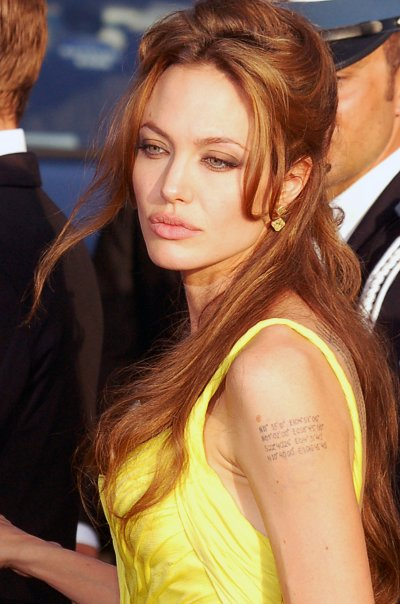
Jolie at the 2007 Cannes Film Festival

As the daughter of actor Jon Voight, Jolie appeared in the media from an early age. Early in her own career, she gained a reputation as a "wild child", which contributed to her success in the late 1990s and early 2000s. Celebrity profiles routinely covered her fascination with blood and knives, experiences with drugs, and her sex life, particularly her bisexuality and interest in sadomasochism. In 2000, when asked about her outspokenness, she stated: "I say things that other people might go through. That's what artists should do—throw things out there and not be perfect and not have answers for anything and see if people understand." Another contributing factor to her controversial image were tabloid rumors of incest that emerged when Jolie, upon winning her Oscar for Girl, Interrupted, kissed her brother on the lips and said, "I'm so in love with my brother right now." She dismissed the speculation by explaining that, as children of divorce, she and James relied on one another for emotional support, and added, "It was disappointing that something so beautiful and pure could be turned into a circus."

Jolie's reputation began to change positively after she, at age 26, became a Goodwill Ambassador for the United Nations High Commissioner for Refugees, later commenting, "In my early 20s I was fighting with myself. Now I take that punk in me to Washington, and I fight for something important." Owing to her extensive activism, her Q Score—a marketing industry measure of celebrities' likability—nearly doubled to 25 between 2000 and 2006. Her recognizability grew accordingly; by 2006, she was familiar to 81% of Americans, compared to 31% in 2000. She became noted for her ability to positively influence her public image through the media, without employing a publicist or an agent. Her Q Score remained above average even when, in 2005, she was accused of ending Brad Pitt's marriage to Jennifer Aniston, at which point her public persona became an unlikely combination of alleged homewrecker, mother, sex symbol, and humanitarian. Jolie was found to be the most admired woman in the world in global surveys conducted by YouGov in 2015 and 2016.

Jolie's general influence and wealth are extensively documented. In a 2006 global industry survey by ACNielsen in 42 international markets, Jolie, together with Pitt, was found to be the favorite celebrity endorser for brands and products worldwide. Jolie was the face of St. John and Shiseido from 2006 to 2008, and a decade later became a spokesmodel for Guerlain. Her 2011 endorsement deal with Louis Vuitton, reportedly worth $10 million, was a record for a single advertising campaign. Jolie was among the Time 100, a list of the most influential people in the world as published by Time, in 2006 and 2008. She was named the world's most powerful celebrity in Forbes's Celebrity 100 issue in 2009, and, though ranked lower overall, was listed as the most powerful actress from 2006 to 2008 and 2011 to 2013. Forbes additionally cited her as Hollywood's highest-paid actress in 2009, 2011, and 2013, with estimated annual earnings of $27 million, $30 million, and $33 million respectively.

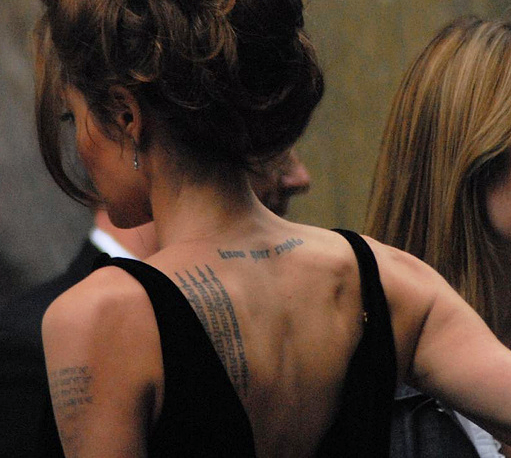
Jolie at the premiere of A Mighty Heart in 2007; several of her tattoos are visible

Jolie's public image is strongly tied to her noted beauty and sex appeal. Many media outlets, including Vogue, People, and Vanity Fair, have cited her as the world's most beautiful woman, while others such as Esquire, FHM, and Empire have named her the sexiest woman alive; both titles have often been based on public polls in which Jolie places far ahead of other celebrity women. Her most recognizable physical features are her many tattoos, eyes, and in particular her full lips, which The New York Times considered as defining a feature as Kirk Douglas' chin or Bette Davis' eyes. Among her estimated 20 tattoos are the Latin proverb quod me nutrit me destruit ("what nourishes me destroys me"), the quote "A prayer for the wild at heart, kept in cages" (from Stairs to the Roof by Tennessee Williams), four Buddhist Sanskrit prayers of protection, a 12-inch tiger, and geographical coordinates of where she first met her adopted children. Over time, she has covered or lasered several of her tattoos, including "Billy Bob", the name of her second husband.

Professionally, Jolie's status as a sex symbol has been considered both an asset and a hindrance. Some of her most commercially successful films, including Lara Croft: Tomb Raider (2001) and Beowulf (2007), overtly relied at least in part on her sex appeal, with Empire stating that her "pneumatic figure", "feline eyes", and "bee-stung lips" have greatly contributed to her appeal to audiences. Conversely, Salon writer Allen Barra agreed with critics who suggested that Jolie's "dark and intense sexuality" has limited her in the types of roles she can be cast in, thus rendering her unconvincing in many conventional women's roles, while Clint Eastwood, who directed her Oscar-nominated performance in Changeling (2008), opined that having "the most beautiful face on the planet" sometimes harmed her dramatic credibility with audiences.

== Cultural impact ==
Wax figure of Jolie at Madame Tussauds Bangkok

Jolie's appearance has been credited with influencing popular culture at large. In 2002, AfterEllen founder Sarah Warn observed that many women of all sexual orientations had publicly expressed their attraction to Jolie, which she considered a new development in American culture, adding that "there are many beautiful women in Hollywood, and few generate the same kind of overwhelming interest across genders and sexual orientations that she does". Jolie's physical attributes became highly sought-after among western women seeking cosmetic surgery; by 2007, she was considered "the gold standard of beauty", with her full lips remaining the most imitated celebrity feature well into the 2010s. After a 2011 repeat survey by Allure found that Jolie most represented the American beauty ideal, compared to model Christie Brinkley in 1991, writer Elizabeth Angell credited society with having "branched out beyond the Barbie-doll ideal and embraced something quite different". In 2013, Jeffrey Kluger of Time agreed that Jolie has for many years symbolized the feminine ideal, and opined that her frank discussion of her double mastectomy redefined beauty.

Jolie is considered a style icon and trendsetter for celebrity fashion. She began making red carpet appearances at age ten. In the 1990s, she established an enduring partnership with Versace. In her early film career, she became known for wearing gothic styles and leather, "coquette" looks; her style was seen as dark, vampish, dramatic, and alluring. Her sequined Randolph Duke gown at the 1999 Golden Globe Awards was regarded as her fashion debut. Jolie wore a white satin dress by Marc Bouwer to the 76th Academy Awards, which drew critical praise and comparisons to the fashion of several classic film stars. As she transitioned to directorial and humanitarian work, her style grew more sophisticated, minimalist, and glamorous, with looks associated with Old Hollywood. In the 2010s, Jolie wore satin gowns, diamond jewelry, and Grecian silhouettes. She attended the 84th Academy Awards in a black Versace gown, which has been deemed one of the most significant gowns in fashion history and pop culture, with Jolie's posing becoming the subject of Internet memes. In the 2020s, Jolie adopted more sustainable fashion.

== Humanitarian work ==
=== UNHCR ambassadorship ===
We cannot close ourselves off to information and ignore the fact that millions of people are out there suffering. I honestly want to help. I don't believe I feel differently from other people. I think we all want justice and equality, a chance for a life with meaning. All of us would like to believe that if we were in a bad situation someone would help us.

— Jolie on her motives for joining UNHCR in 2001

Jolie first witnessed the effects of a humanitarian crisis while filming Lara Croft: Tomb Raider (2001) in war-torn Cambodia, an experience she later credited with having brought her a greater understanding of the world. Upon her return home, Jolie contacted the United Nations High Commissioner for Refugees (UNHCR) for information on international trouble spots. To learn more about the conditions in these areas, she began visiting refugee camps around the world. In February 2001, she went on her first field visit, an 18-day mission to Sierra Leone and Tanzania; she later expressed her shock at what she had witnessed.

In the following months, Jolie returned to Cambodia for two weeks and met with Afghan refugees in Pakistan, where she donated $1 million in response to an international UNHCR emergency appeal, the largest donation UNHCR had ever received from a private individual. She covered all costs related to her missions and shared the same rudimentary working and living conditions as UNHCR field staff on all of her visits. Jolie was named a UNHCR Goodwill Ambassador at UNHCR headquarters in Geneva on August 27, 2001.

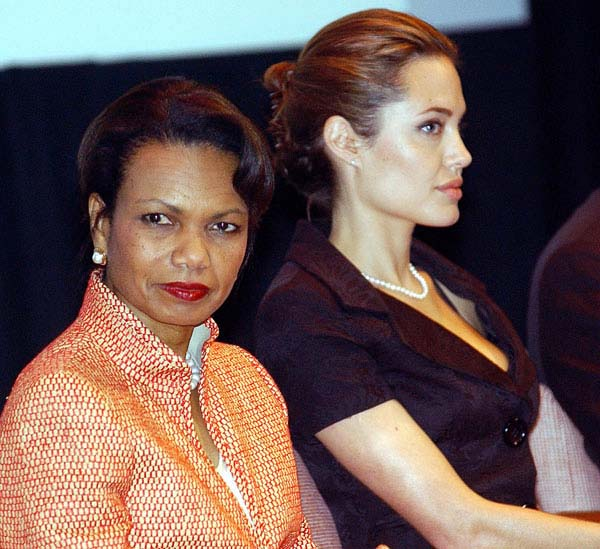
Jolie and Secretary of State Condoleezza Rice at a UNHCR celebration of World Refugee Day in June 2005

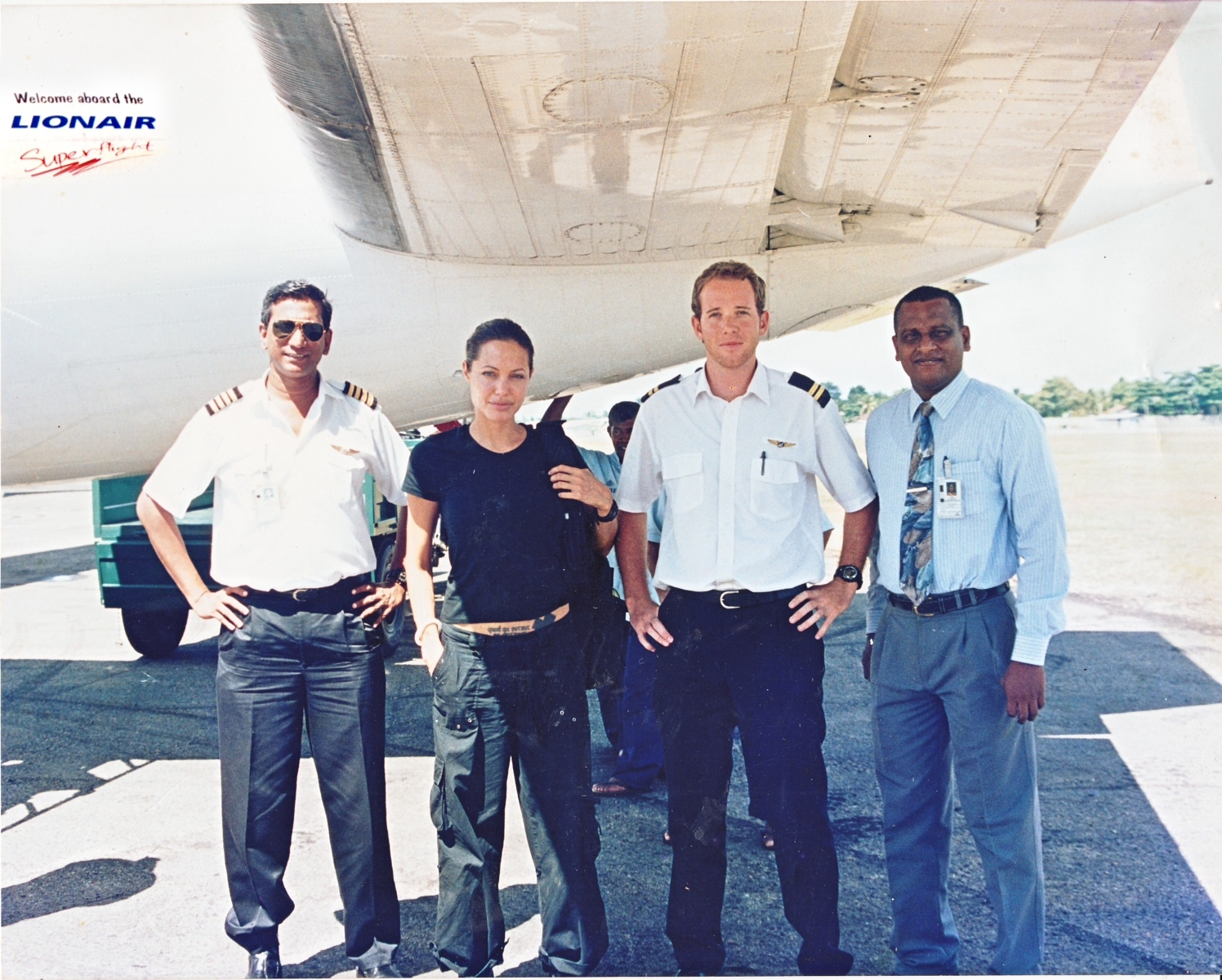
Jolie is seen during her visit to war-ravaged Jaffna and other parts of Northern Province, Sri Lanka as the Goodwill Ambassador for UNHCR in 2003.

Over the next decade, she went on more than 40 field missions, meeting with refugees and internally displaced persons in over 30 countries. In 2002, when asked what she hoped to accomplish, she stated, "Awareness of the plight of these people. I think they should be commended for what they have survived, not looked down upon." To that end, her 2001–02 field visits were chronicled in her book Notes from My Travels, which was published in October 2003 in conjunction with the release of her humanitarian drama Beyond Borders.

Jolie aimed to visit what she termed "forgotten emergencies", crises that media attention had shifted away from. She became noted for traveling to war zones, such as Sudan's Darfur region during the Darfur conflict, the Syrian-Iraqi border during the Second Gulf War, where she met privately with U.S. troops and other multi-national forces, and the Afghan capital Kabul during the war in Afghanistan, where three aid workers were murdered in the midst of her first visit. To aid her travels, she started to take flying lessons in 2004 with the aim of ferrying aid workers and food supplies around the world. Jolie acquired a pilot license in 2004; as of May 2014, she owns a Cirrus SR22 aircraft and a Cessna 208 Caravan aircraft.

On April 17, 2012, after more than a decade of service as a UNHCR Goodwill Ambassador, Jolie was promoted to the rank of Special Envoy to High Commissioner António Guterres, the first to take on such a position within the organization. In her expanded role, she was given authority to represent Guterres and UNHCR at the diplomatic level, with a focus on major refugee crises. In the months following her promotion, she made her first visit as Special Envoy—her third over all—to Ecuador, where she met with Colombian refugees, and she accompanied Guterres on a week-long tour of Jordan, Lebanon, Turkey, and Iraq, to assess the situation of refugees from neighboring Syria. Since then, Jolie has been on over a dozen field missions around the world to meet with refugees and undertake advocacy on their behalf.

Jolie resigned from the ambassadorship in December 2022. In her announcement, she pledged to continue to advocate for refugees.

=== Conservation and community development ===
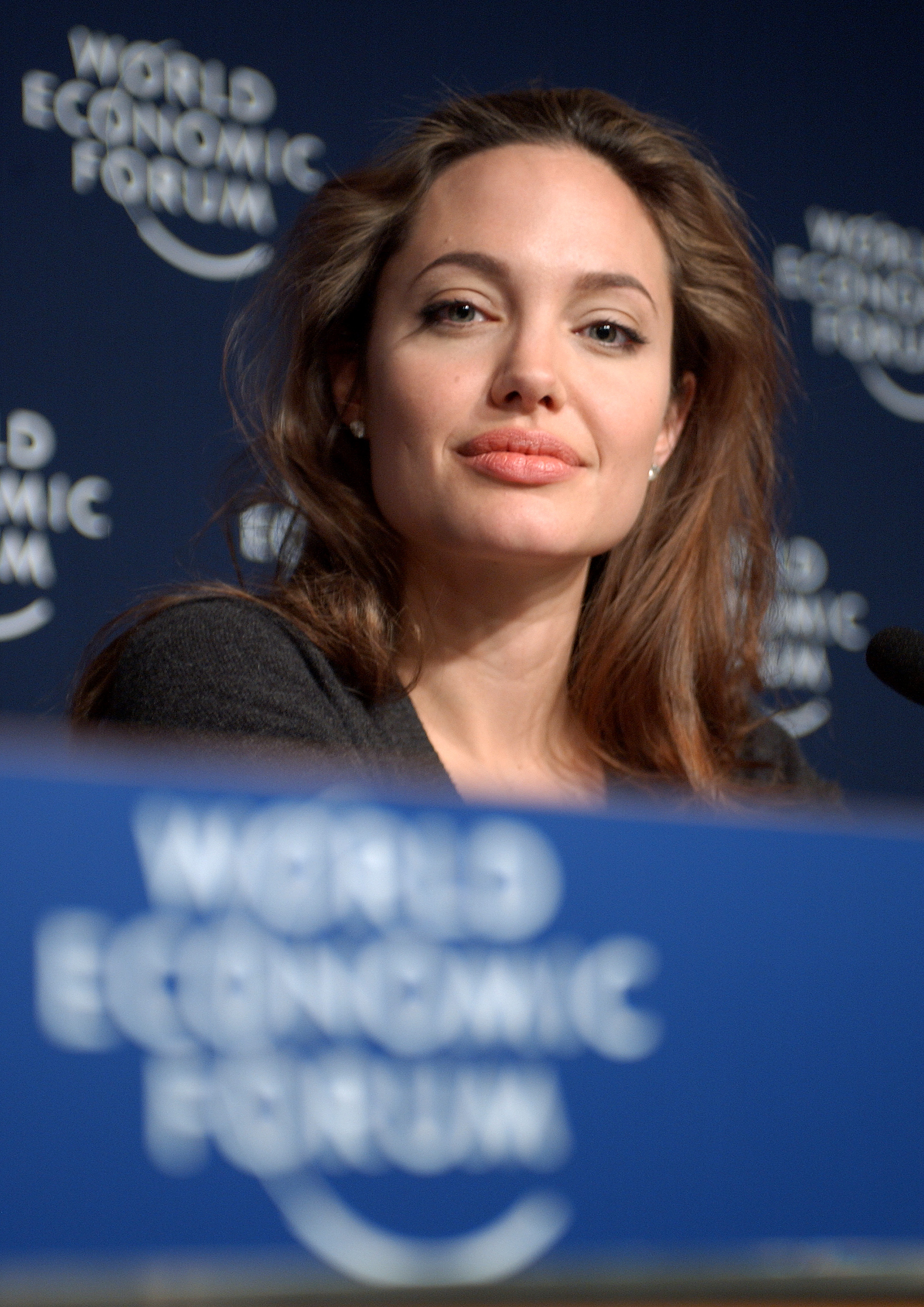
Jolie at the World Economic Forum's annual meeting in January 2005

In an effort to connect her Cambodian-born adopted son with his heritage, Jolie purchased a house in his country of birth in 2003. The traditional home sat on 39 hectares in the northwestern province Battambang, adjacent to Samlout national park in the Cardamom Mountains, which had become infiltrated with poachers who threatened endangered species. She purchased the park's 60,000 hectares and turned the area into a wildlife reserve named for her son, the Maddox Jolie Project.

In November 2006, Jolie expanded the scope of the project—renamed the Maddox Jolie-Pitt Foundation (MJP)—to create Asia's first Millennium Village, in accordance with UN development goals. She was inspired by a meeting with the founder of Millennium Promise, noted economist Jeffrey Sachs, at the World Economic Forum in Davos, where she was an invited speaker in 2005 and 2006. Together they filmed a 2005 MTV special, The Diary of Angelina Jolie & Dr. Jeffrey Sachs in Africa, which followed them on a trip to a Millennium Village in western Kenya. By mid-2007, some 6,000 villagers and 72 employees—some of them former poachers employed as rangers—lived and worked at MJP, in ten villages previously isolated from one another. The compound includes schools, roads, and a soy milk factory, all funded by Jolie. Her home functions as the MJP field headquarters.

After filming Beyond Borders (2003) in Namibia, Jolie became patron of the Harnas Wildlife Foundation, a wildlife orphanage and medical center in the Kalahari Desert. She first visited the Harnas farm during production of the film, which features vultures rescued by the foundation. In December 2010, Jolie and her partner, Brad Pitt, established the Shiloh Jolie-Pitt Foundation to support conservation work by the Naankuse Wildlife Sanctuary, a nature reserve also located in the Kalahari. In name of their Namibian-born daughter, they have funded large-animal conservation projects as well as a free health clinic, housing, and a school for the San Bushmen community at Naankuse. Jolie and Pitt support other causes through the Jolie-Pitt Foundation, established in September 2006.

=== Child immigration and education ===
Jolie has pushed for legislation to aid child immigrants and other vulnerable children in both the U.S. and developing nations, including the "Unaccompanied Alien Child Protection Act of 2005." She lobbied for humanitarian interests in the U.S. capital from 2003 onwards, explaining, "As much as I would love to never have to visit Washington, that's the way to move the ball." Since October 2008, she has co-chaired Kids in Need of Defense (KIND), a network of leading U.S. law firms that provide free legal aid to unaccompanied minors in immigration proceedings across the U.S. Founded in a collaboration between Jolie and the Microsoft Corporation, by 2013, KIND had become the principal provider of pro bono lawyers for immigrant children. Jolie had previously, from 2005 to 2007, funded the launch of a similar initiative, the U.S. Committee for Refugees and Immigrants' National Center for Refugee and Immigrant Children.

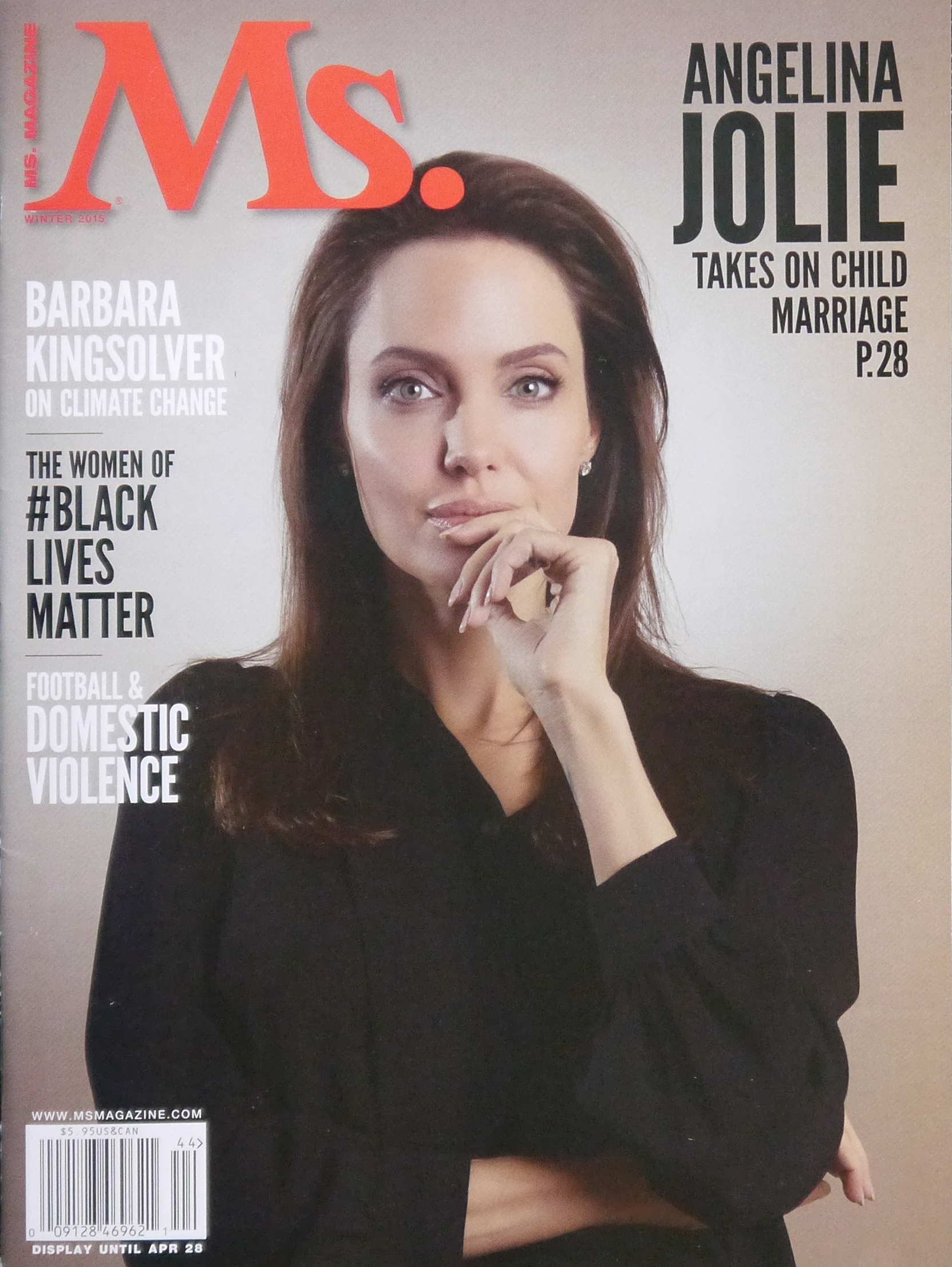
Jolie on the cover of Ms. magazine in 2015, in which she discusses child marriage

Jolie has also advocated for children's education. Since its founding at the Clinton Global Initiative's annual meeting in September 2007, she has co-chaired the Education Partnership for Children of Conflict, which provides policy and funding to education programs for children in conflict-affected regions. In its first year, the partnership supported education projects for Iraqi refugee children, youth affected by the Darfur conflict, and girls in rural Afghanistan, among other affected groups. The partnership has worked closely with the Council on Foreign Relations' Center for Universal Education—founded by the partnership's co-chair, noted economist Gene Sperling—to establish education policies, which resulted in recommendations made to UN agencies, G8 development agencies, and the World Bank. Since April 2013, all proceeds from Jolie's high-end jewelry collection, Style of Jolie, have benefited the partnership's work. Jolie additionally launched the Malala Fund, a grant system established by Pakistani education activist Malala Yousafzai, at the 2013 Women in the World Summit; she personally contributed over $200,000 to the cause.

Jolie has funded a school and boarding facility for girls at Kakuma refugee camp in northwestern Kenya, which opened in 2005, and two primary schools for girls in the returnee settlements Tangi and Qalai Gudar in eastern Afghanistan, which opened in March 2010 and November 2012 respectively. In addition to the facilities at the Millennium Village she established in Cambodia, Jolie had built at least ten other schools in the country by 2005. In February 2006, she opened the Maddox Chivan Children's Center, a medical and educational facility for children affected by HIV, in the Cambodian capital Phnom Penh. In Sebeta, Ethiopia, the birthplace of her eldest daughter, she funds a sister facility, the Zahara Children's Center, which treats and educates children who have HIV or tuberculosis. Both centers are run by the Global Health Committee.

Jolie is the executive producer of the BBC program My World which aims to teach teenagers how to think critically about what they read and how to tell high-quality journalism from bad. She and Amnesty International released a children's rights book titled Know Your Rights and Claim Them on September 2, 2021. She co-authored the book with British human rights lawyer Geraldine Van Bueren.

=== Human rights and women's rights ===
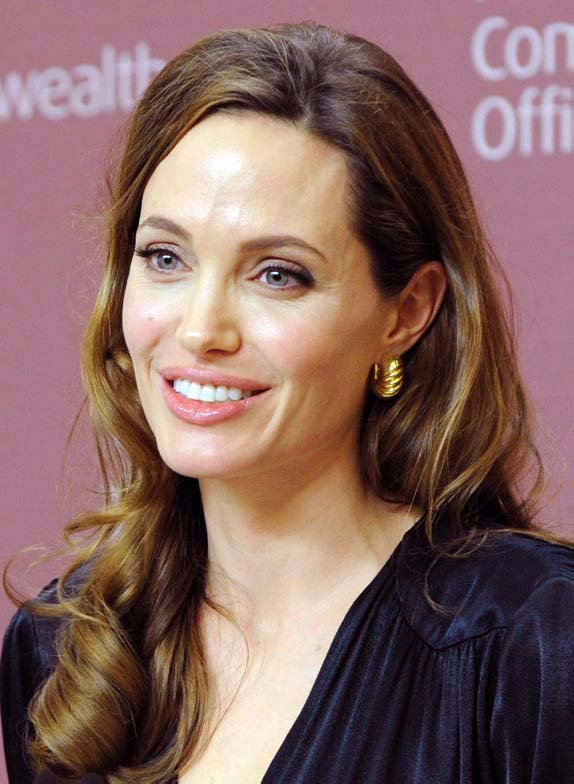
Jolie at the launch of the Preventing Sexual Violence Initiative in 2012

After Jolie joined the Council on Foreign Relations (CFR) in June 2007, she hosted a symposium on international law and justice at CFR headquarters and funded several CFR special reports, including "Intervention to Stop Genocide and Mass Atrocities." In January 2011, she established the Jolie Legal Fellowship, a network of lawyers and attorneys who are sponsored to advocate the development of human rights in their countries. Its member attorneys, called Jolie Legal Fellows, have facilitated child protection efforts in Haiti in the wake of the 2010 earthquake and promoted the development of an inclusive democratic process in Libya following the 2011 revolution.

Jolie has fronted a campaign against sexual violence in military conflict zones by the UK government, which made the issue a priority of its 2013 G8 presidency. In May 2012, she launched the Preventing Sexual Violence Initiative (PSVI) with Foreign Secretary William Hague, who was inspired to campaign on the issue by her Bosnian war drama In the Land of Blood and Honey (2011). PSVI was established to complement wider UK government work by raising awareness and promoting international co-operation. Jolie spoke on the subject at the G8 foreign ministers meeting, where the attending nations adopted a historic declaration, and before the UN security council, which responded by adopting its broadest resolution on the issue to date. In June 2014, she co-chaired the four-day Global Summit to End Sexual Violence in Conflict, the largest-ever meeting on the subject, which resulted in a protocol endorsed by 151 nations.

Through her work on the PSVI, Jolie met foreign policy experts Chloe Dalton and Arminka Helic, who served as special advisers to Hague. Their collaboration resulted in the 2015 founding of Jolie Pitt Dalton Helic, a partnership dedicated to women's rights and international justice, among other causes. In May 2016, Jolie was appointed a visiting professor at the London School of Economics to contribute to a postgraduate degree program at the university's Centre on Women, Peace and Security, which she had launched with Hague the previous year. In February 2022, Jolie with her daughter Zahara visited Washington, D.C. for the Senate introduction of the Violence Against Women Reauthorization Act, a bill designed to prevent and respond to domestic violence, sexual assault, dating violence, and stalking. She worked closely with the bill's sponsors and advocates. She's also an advocate for Kayden's Law, a law focuses on trauma-informed court processes, legal standards and judicial training that minimizes the risk of harm to children. Jolie is an advocate for the passage of the Justice for All Reauthorization Act of 2022, a law created to improve crime victims' right to evidence and agency reports, forensic science, end the rape kit backlog, and address racial disparities in wrongful convictions in America's criminal legal system.

In September 2020, Jolie made a donation to two young boys who were running a lemonade stand in London to raise money for the people of Yemen, as the country was on the brink of humanitarian crisis caused by the Saudi-led coalition and Houthi rebels.

In March 2022, a month into the Russian invasion of Ukraine, Jolie visited Ukrainian children at the Vatican Children's Hospital Bambino Gesù. According to the clinic, Jolie commented, "I am praying for an end to the war. This is the only way to end the suffering and the flight from the conflict zone. It's terrifying to see children paying the price in lost lives, compromised health and trauma." She visited Lviv in May to meet with more displaced and hospitalized children. Jolie returned to Ukraine in November 2025, visiting schools and medical centers in Kherson and Mykolaiv.

In 2023, Jolie voiced strong criticism of Israel for its military actions in Gaza during the Gaza war. In a statement posted on Instagram, Jolie condemned what she described as "the deliberate bombing of a trapped population" in the densely populated Palestinian enclave. She accused global leaders of "complicity in these crimes" for their silence and demanded a humanitarian ceasefire. On 2 January 2026, Jolie visited the Rafah Border Crossing in Egypt to evaluate the delivery of humanitarian aid into Gaza and to meet Palestinians who were transferred for medical treatment.

== Recognition and honors ==
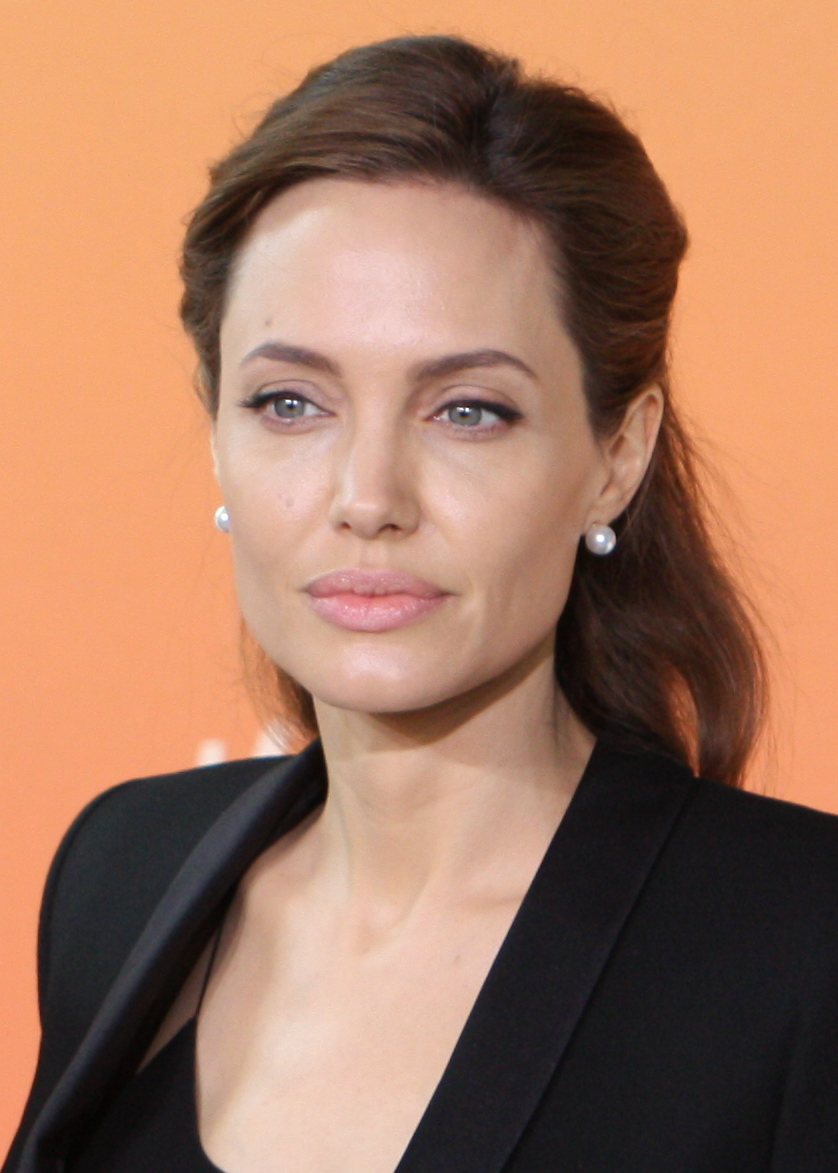
Jolie at the Global Summit to End Sexual Violence in Conflict in 2014

Jolie has received wide recognition for her humanitarian work. In August 2002, she received the inaugural Humanitarian Award from the Church World Service's Immigration and Refugee Program, and in October 2003, she was the first recipient of the Citizen of the World Award by the United Nations Correspondents Association. She was awarded the Global Humanitarian Award by the UNA-USA in October 2005, and she received the Freedom Award from the International Rescue Committee in November 2007. In October 2011, UN High Commissioner for Refugees António Guterres presented Jolie with a gold pin reserved for the most long-serving staff, in recognition of her decade as a UNHCR Goodwill Ambassador.

In November 2013, Jolie received the Jean Hersholt Humanitarian Award, an honorary Academy Award, from the Board of Governors of the Academy of Motion Picture Arts and Sciences. In June 2014, she was appointed an Honorary Dame Commander of the Order of St Michael and St George (DCMG) for her services to the UK's foreign policy and campaigning to end sexual violence in war zones. Queen Elizabeth II presented Jolie with the insignia of her honorary damehood during a private ceremony the following October.

== Personal life ==
=== Relationships and marriages ===
Jolie had a serious boyfriend for two years from the age of 14. Her mother allowed them to live together in her home, of which Jolie later said,

I was either going to be reckless on the streets with my boyfriend or he was going to be with me in my bedroom with my mom in the next room. She made the choice, and because of it, I continued to go to school every morning and explored my first relationship in a safe way.

She has compared the relationship to a marriage in its emotional intensity, and said that the breakup compelled her to dedicate herself to her acting career at age 16.

During filming of Hackers (1995), Jolie had a romance with actor Jonny Lee Miller, her first lover since the relationship in her early teens. They were not in touch for months after production ended, but eventually reconnected and married soon after in March 1996. She attended her wedding in black rubber pants and a white T-shirt, upon which she had written the groom's name in her blood. The relationship ended the following year, with Jolie saying her busy work schedule kept them apart too often. Jolie remained on good terms with Miller, whom she called "a solid man and a solid friend". Their divorce, initiated by Jolie in February 1999, was finalized shortly before she remarried the next year.

Prior to her marriage to Miller, Jolie began a relationship with model and actress Jenny Shimizu on the set of Foxfire (1996). In 1997, she said, "I would probably have married Jenny if I hadn't married my husband. I fell in love with her the first second I saw her." According to Shimizu, their relationship lasted several years and continued even while Jolie was romantically involved with other people. In a 1997 interview with the lesbian magazine Girlfriends, she was asked how she felt about being a sex symbol to both men and women; she responded "It's great because I love men and women." In 2003, when asked if she was bisexual, Jolie answered, "Of course. If I fell in love with a woman tomorrow, would I feel that it's okay to want to kiss and touch her? If I fell in love with her? Absolutely! Yes!"

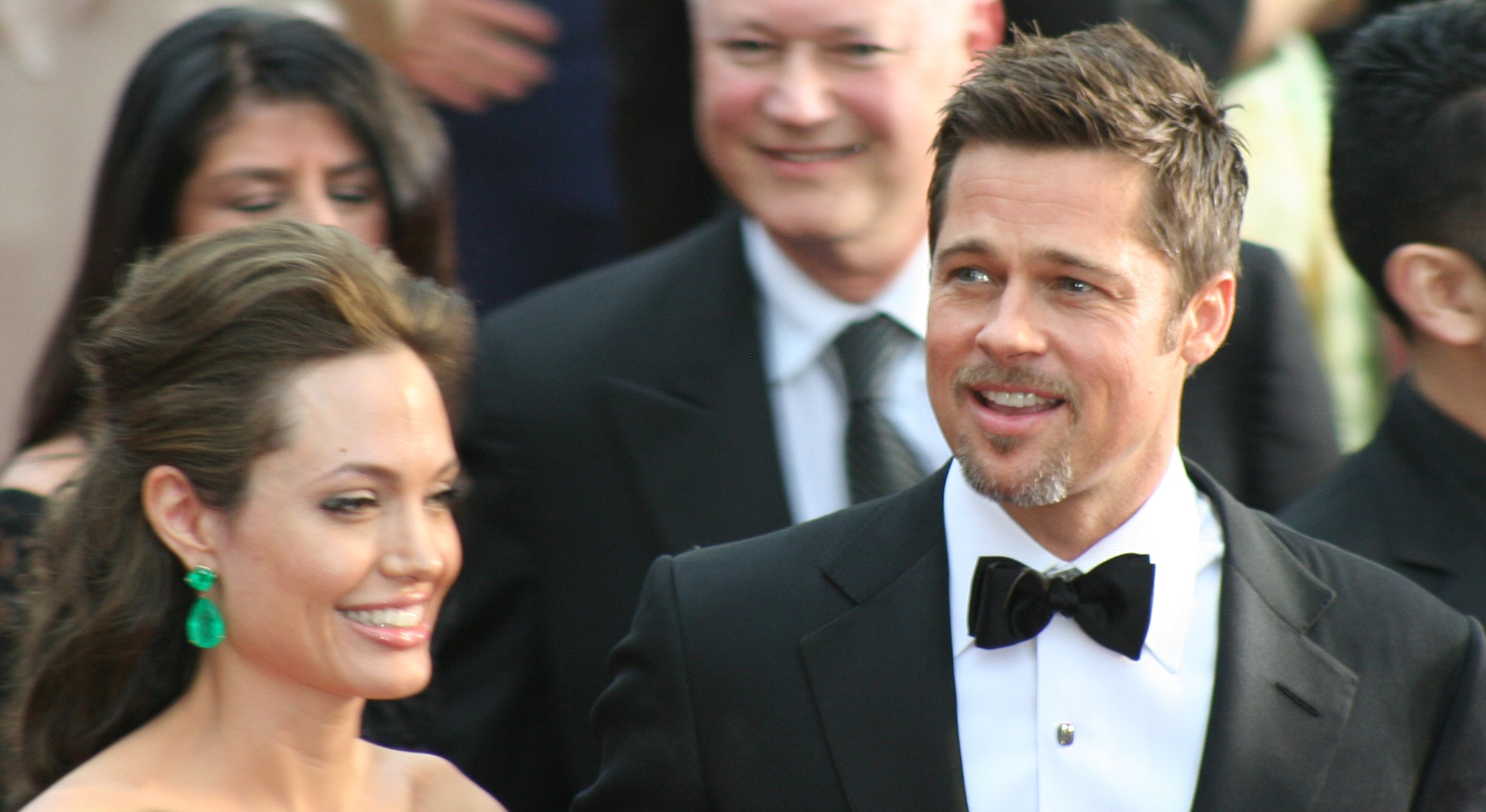
Jolie with her then-partner Brad Pitt at the 81st Academy Awards in 2009, where they each received an Academy Award nomination

After a two-month courtship, Jolie married actor Billy Bob Thornton on May 5, 2000, in Las Vegas. They had met on the set of Pushing Tin (1999) but did not pursue a relationship at that time, as Thornton was engaged to actress Laura Dern, while Jolie was reportedly dating actor Timothy Hutton, her co-star in Playing God (1997). As a result of their frequent public declarations of passion and gestures of love—most famously wearing one another's blood in vials around their necks—their marriage became a favorite topic of the entertainment media. Jolie and Thornton announced the adoption of a child from Cambodia in March 2002 but abruptly separated three months later. Thornton filed for divorce, saying their lifestyles were too different. Their divorce was finalized on May 27, 2003. When asked about the sudden dissolution of their marriage, Jolie stated, "It took me by surprise, too, because overnight, we totally changed. I think one day we had just nothing in common. And it's scary but ... I think it can happen when you get involved and you don't know yourself yet."

Jolie was involved in a prominent scandal when she was accused of causing the divorce of actors Brad Pitt and Jennifer Aniston in October 2005 (who had been living apart since January 2005). She said she fell in love with Pitt during the filming of Mr. & Mrs. Smith (2005), but dismissed allegations of an affair, saying, "To be intimate with a married man, when my own father cheated on my mother, is not something I could forgive. I could not look at myself in the morning if I did that. I wouldn't be attracted to a man who would cheat on his wife." Neither Jolie nor Pitt would publicly comment on the nature of their relationship until January 2006, when she confirmed they were expecting their first child together.

During their 12-year relationship, the couple were dubbed "Brangelina"—a portmanteau coined by the media—and were the subject of worldwide media coverage. They became known as one of Hollywood's most glamorous couples. Their family grew to include six children, three of whom were adopted, before they announced their engagement in April 2012. Jolie and Pitt were legally married on August 14, 2014, and had their wedding in a private ceremony at the Château Miraval, France on August 23, 2014. She subsequently took the name "Angelina Jolie Pitt". After two years of marriage, the couple separated on September 15, 2016. On September 19, Jolie filed for divorce citing irreconcilable differences. They were declared legally single on April 12, 2019. After Pitt sued Jolie for selling her share of a winery they owned to a third party, she filed a countersuit, in which she alleged that he physically and verbally abused her and their children on a plane in 2016.

=== Children ===
Jolie has six children: three were adopted internationally, while three are biological.

On March 10, 2002, Jolie adopted her first child, seven-month-old Maddox Chivan, from an orphanage in Battambang, Cambodia. He was born on August 5, 2001, in a local village. After twice visiting Cambodia, while filming Lara Croft: Tomb Raider (2001) and on a UNHCR field mission, Jolie returned in November 2001 with her then-husband, Billy Bob Thornton, where they met and subsequently applied to adopt Maddox. The adoption process was halted the following month when the U.S. government banned adoptions from Cambodia amid allegations of child trafficking. Although Jolie's adoption facilitator was later convicted of visa fraud and money laundering, her adoption of Maddox was deemed lawful. Once the process was finalized, she took custody of Maddox in Namibia, where she was filming Beyond Borders (2003). Jolie and Thornton announced the adoption together, but she adopted Maddox alone, becoming a single parent following her separation from Thornton three months later.

Jolie adopted her second child, six-month-old Zahara Marley, from an orphanage in Addis Ababa, Ethiopia, on July 6, 2005. Zahara was born on January 8, 2005, in Awasa. Jolie initially believed Zahara to be an AIDS orphan, based on official testimony from her grandmother, but Zahara's birth mother later came forward in the media. She explained that she had abandoned her family when Zahara became sick, and said she thought Zahara was "very fortunate" to have been adopted by Jolie. Jolie was accompanied by her then-partner, Brad Pitt, when she traveled to Ethiopia to take custody of Zahara. She later indicated that they had together made the decision to adopt from Ethiopia, having first visited the country earlier that year. After Pitt announced his intention to adopt her children, she filed a petition to legally change their surname from Jolie to Jolie-Pitt, which was granted on January 19, 2006. Pitt adopted Maddox and Zahara soon after.

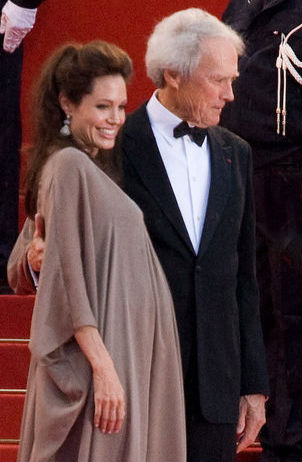
A pregnant Jolie attending the premiere of Changeling with director Clint Eastwood at the 2008 Cannes Film Festival

In an attempt to avoid the unprecedented media frenzy surrounding their relationship, Jolie and Pitt traveled to Namibia for the birth of their first biological child. On May 27, 2006, she gave birth to Shiloh Nouvel, in Swakopmund. Shiloh's middle name is homage to French architect Jean Nouvel. During labor, Jolie had fits of hysteric laughter due to the administration of morphine. They sold the first pictures of Shiloh through the distributor Getty Images with the aim of benefiting charity, rather than allowing paparazzi to take the photographs. People and Hello! magazines purchased the North American and British rights to the images for $4.1 and $3.5 million, respectively, a record in celebrity photojournalism at that time, with all proceeds donated to UNICEF.

On March 15, 2007, Jolie adopted her fourth child, three-year-old Pax Thien, from an orphanage in Ho Chi Minh City, Vietnam. Pax had been born on November 29, 2003, in HCMC, and had been abandoned soon after birth. After visiting the orphanage with Pitt in November 2006, Jolie applied for adoption as a single parent, because Vietnam's adoption regulations did not allow unmarried couples to co-adopt. After their return to the United States, she petitioned the court to change Pax Thien's surname from Jolie to Jolie-Pitt, which was approved on May 31. Pitt subsequently adopted Pax on February 21, 2008.

At the 2008 Cannes Film Festival, Jolie confirmed that she was expecting twins. During the two weeks she spent in a seaside hospital in Nice, France, reporters and photographers camped on the promenade outside it. She gave birth in July 2008 to Knox Léon Jolie-Pitt and Vivienne Marcheline Jolie-Pitt. They were born in Nice, France. The first pictures of the twins were jointly sold to People and Hello! for a reported $14 million—the most expensive celebrity photographs ever taken. All proceeds were donated to the Jolie-Pitt Foundation.

=== Cambodian nationality ===
In 2004, Cambodian prime minister Hun Sen offered Jolie Cambodian nationality due to her humanitarian work in the country. Cambodia holds special significance for Jolie as the birthplace of her adopted son, Maddox Chivan. In 2005, the citizenship process was completed when King Norodom Sihamoni granted Jolie Cambodian citizenship through a royal decree.

=== Cancer prevention treatment ===
On February 16, 2013, at age 37, Jolie underwent a preventive double mastectomy after learning she had an 87% risk of developing breast cancer due to a defective BRCA1 gene. Her maternal family history warranted genetic testing for BRCA mutations: her mother had breast cancer and died of ovarian cancer, while her grandmother died of ovarian cancer. Her aunt, who had the same BRCA1 defect, died of breast cancer three months after Jolie's operation. Following the mastectomy, which lowered her chances of developing breast cancer to under five percent, Jolie had reconstructive surgery involving implants and allografts (transplantations from a donor). Two years later, in March 2015, after annual test results indicated possible signs of early ovarian cancer, she underwent a preventive salpingo-oophorectomy (removal of an ovary and its fallopian tube), as she had a fifty percent risk of developing ovarian cancer due to the same genetic anomaly. Despite hormone replacement therapy, the surgery brought on premature menopause.

I choose not to keep my story private because there are many women who do not know that they might be living under the shadow of cancer. It is my hope that they, too, will be able to get gene tested, and that if they have a high risk they, too, will know that they have strong options.

— Jolie on her reasons for speaking out about her mastectomy

After completing each operation, Jolie discussed her mastectomy and oophorectomy in op-eds published by The New York Times, with the aim of helping other women make informed health choices. She detailed her diagnosis, surgeries, and personal experiences, and described her decision to undergo preventive surgery as a proactive measure for the sake of her six children. Jolie further wrote: "On a personal note, I do not feel any less of a woman. I feel empowered that I made a strong choice that in no way diminishes my femininity."

Jolie's announcement of her mastectomy attracted widespread publicity and discussion on BRCA mutations and genetic testing. Her decision was met with praise from various public figures, while health campaigners welcomed her raising awareness of the options available to at-risk women. Dubbed "The Angelina Effect" by a Time cover story, Jolie's influence led to a "global and long-lasting" increase in BRCA gene testing: the number of referrals tripled in Australia and doubled in the United Kingdom, parts of Canada, and India, as well as significantly increased in other European countries and the United States. Researchers in Canada and the United Kingdom found that despite the large increase, the percentage of mutation carriers remained the same, meaning Jolie's message had reached those most at risk. In her first op-ed, Jolie had advocated for wider accessibility of BRCA gene testing and acknowledged the high costs, which were greatly reduced after a 2013 U.S. Supreme Court ruling invalidated BRCA gene patents held by Myriad Genetics.

== Film credits and accolades ==
Jolie has appeared in over thirty film productions since 1982. According to the review aggregator site Rotten Tomatoes and infotainment website Screen Rant, her most critically acclaimed and commercially successful films are Playing by Heart (1998), Gone in 60 Seconds (2000), Lara Croft: Tomb Raider (2001), Lara Croft: Tomb Raider – The Cradle of Life (2003), Sky Captain and the World of Tomorrow (2004), Alexander (2004), Mr. & Mrs. Smith (2005), Beowulf (2007), A Mighty Heart (2007), Changeling (2008), Kung Fu Panda (2008), Wanted (2008), Salt (2010), The Tourist (2010), Maleficent (2014), and Maleficent: Mistress of Evil (2019). Her television projects comprise the miniseries True Women (1997), and the films George Wallace (1997) and Gia (1998).

Jolie has directed a number of films, such as In the Land of Blood and Honey (2011), Unbroken (2014), By the Sea (2015), First They Killed My Father (2017), and Without Blood (2024).

Jolie has received several awards including an Academy Award, three Golden Globe Awards, two Screen Actors Guild Awards and a Tony Award as well as nominations for two British Academy Film Awards and two Primetime Emmy Awards. The Academy of Motion Picture Arts and Sciences honored her with the Jean Hersholt Humanitarian Award in 2013.

== Written works ==
Books

- Jolie, Angelina (2003). Notes from My Travels: Visits with Refugees in Africa, Cambodia, Pakistan and Ecuador. Simon and Schuster. ISBN 9781416592013.
- Amnesty International; Jolie, Angelina; Van Bueren, Geraldine (2021). Know Your Rights and Claim Them: A Guide for Youth. Zest Books. ISBN 9781728449654.

Articles

- Jolie, Angelina (May 14, 2013). "My medical choice". The New York Times.
- Jolie, Angelina (March 2–9, 2020). "The price of inaction in Syria". Time. Vol. 195, no. 7–8 (International ed.). pp. 17–18. Archived from the original on February 13, 2023. (Note: Online version is titled "Angelina Jolie: the cost of inaction in Syria is too high".)

== See also ==
- Aptostichus angelinajolieae – Species of spider named after Jolie
- List of oldest and youngest Academy Award winners and nominees
- White Marc Bouwer dress of Angelina Jolie – White dress worn by Angelina Jolie
