= Vafai =

Vafai or Vafaei is the surname of:

- Hossein Vafaei (born 1994), Iranian professional snooker player
- Kambiz Vafai, 20th-21st century mechanical engineer, professor and inventor
