= Kambiz (given name) =

Kambiz is a masculine given name of Persian origin. Notable people with the name include:

== Given name ==
- Kambiz Atabay (1939–2025), Iranian football administrator
- Kambiz Derambakhsh (1942–2021), Iranian designer, illustrator, and graphic artist
- Kambiz Dirbaz (born 1975), Iranian actor
- Kambiz GhaneaBassiri, Iranian-American academic
- Kambiz Hosseini (born 1975), Iranian political satirist, actor, television host, and radio host
- Kambiz Norouzi, Iranian lawyer and university professor
- Kambiz Roshanravan (born 1949), Iranian performing musician, composer, conductor, and music teacher
- Kambiz Vafai, American mechanical engineer, inventor, academic, and author
- Kambiz Yeganegi (born 1948), Iranian business executives
