= State of Cambodia =

State of Cambodia (រដ្ឋកម្ពុជា (Khmer), Rôdth Kâmpŭchéa (UNGEGN)) may refer to:

- Cambodia, as a state
- State of Cambodia (1989–1993) (SOC), the name adopted by the pro-Hanoi People's Republic of Kampuchea (PRK) during its transitional times until the restoration of the monarchy
- Semi-official name of Cambodia between the 18 March 1970 coup and the proclamation of the Khmer Republic on October 9, the same year

== See also ==
- Republic of Kampuchea (disambiguation)
- Kampuchea (disambiguation)
