= Notes from My Travels =

2003 book by Angelina Jolie

- First edition
- Author: Angelina Jolie
- Language: English
- Genre: Memoir
- Publisher: Pocket Books
- Publication date: October 2003
- Publication place: United States
- Media type: Print (trade paperback)
- Pages: 213
- ISBN: 0-7434-7023-0
- OCLC: 53237005
- Dewey Decimal: 362.87 22
- LC Class: HV640 .J65 2003

Notes from My Travels: Visits with Refugees in Africa, Cambodia, Pakistan and Ecuador is a collection of journal excerpts kept by actress Angelina Jolie written from February 2001 through June 2002 detailing her experiences travelling to troubled Third World regions in her role as a Goodwill Ambassador for the United Nations High Commissioner for Refugees (UNHCR).

The book was published in 2003, concurrent with the release of Beyond Borders, a film in which she plays a character who eventually works for UNHCR. It was also during the timeframe of writing these journals that Jolie adopted her Cambodian born son, Maddox.

Notes from My Travels details Jolie's visits to Sierra Leone, Tanzania, Pakistan, Cambodia, and Ecuador.

Jolie donated her proceeds from the book to the UNHCR.

In 2006, Jolie put her handwritten notebooks up for auction with the proceeds benefiting refugees. Bidding started at $150, and the journals were sold for $5,460.

== Release ==
The book was officially released October 28, 2003.

In July 2020, Notes from My Travels was translated into Vietnamese by Hoang Anh Kapi.

== Reception ==
=== Critical response ===
Upon its release Notes from My Travels, was well received with newspapers like The Arab American News saying the book, "...offers insight into refugee life."

In 2016, the book was included in a list by UWIRE of empowering books for Women's History Month. The journalist behind the list Sarah Nichols called the book, "deeply intelligent and thoughtful."

Hoang Anh Kapi who adapted the book for Vietnamese in 2020 called the book, "...a must-read book to understand more about the world we are living in."

Jane Goodall, Ph.D., CBE Founder of the Jane Goodall Institute and UN Messenger of Peace said, "Angelina is living proof of the power we all have—every one of us—to make a difference. I was deeply moved by her descriptions of individual refugees struggling to live with dignity and hope, and found her personal commitment to be an inspiration. Angelina's journals document her awakening as a humanitarian activist and I hope they will move readers to act. I look forward to my continued work with Angelina on behalf of the United Nations."

On December 25, 2018, Syeda Adeela Zainab from the Voice of Journalists said "The book is worth reading for everybody especially for those who want to volunteer their selves for the well being of humanity."

=== Public opinion ===
When interviewed by the Daily Mirror in October 2003, Angelina's father Jon Voight said the book is, "...very well written and moving to read."
