= Kanbawza =

Kanbawza (kambhoja) may refer to:

- Kanbawza, a classical Pali name of Taunggyi, Shan States (in modern-day Myanmar)
- Kanbawzathadi Palace, a palace of King Bayinnaung in Bago, Bago Division
- Kanbawza F.C., a football club based out of Taunggyi, Shan State
- Kanbawza Group of Companies
- Kanbawza Bank, a private bank in Myanmar

== See also ==
- Kamboja (disambiguation)
