= Beyond Borders (film) =

- Theatrical poster for Beyond Borders
- Directed by: Martin Campbell
- Written by: Caspian Tredwell-Owen
- Produced by: Dan Halsted; Lloyd Phillips
- Starring: Angelina Jolie; Clive Owen; Teri Polo; Linus Roache; Noah Emmerich; Yorick van Wageningen
- Cinematography: Phil Méheux
- Edited by: Nicholas Beauman
- Music by: James Horner
- Production companies: Mandalay Pictures; Camelot Pictures
- Distributed by: Paramount Pictures (North America and select international territories); Summit Entertainment (International)
- Release date: October 24, 2003 (U.S.)
- Running time: 127 minutes
- Country: United States
- Language: English
- Budget: $35 million
- Box office: $11.7 million

Beyond Borders is a 2003 American romantic drama film about aid workers, directed by Martin Campbell and starring Angelina Jolie, Clive Owen, Teri Polo and Kate Ashfield. The original music score was composed by James Horner.

Reflecting Jolie's real-life interest in promoting humanitarian relief, the film was critically and financially unsuccessful.

Concurrently with the release of the film, Jolie published Notes from My Travels, a collection of journal entries from her real-life experiences as a Goodwill Ambassador for the United Nations High Commissioner for Refugees (UNHCR) — similar to her character in the film.

== Plot ==
While attending a fund-raising gala, Sarah Jordan, a naïve, married American socialite living in England, witnesses a fiery plea delivered by an intruder – a renegade humanitarian, Dr. Nick Callahan. His plea made on behalf of impoverished children under his care turns Sarah's life upside down. Attracted to Nick and his cause, she impulsively abandons her job at an art gallery and sheltered life in England to do what she can to aid his efforts at the refugee camps. She travels to Ethiopia bringing with her a caravan of essential medical supplies to the impossibly remote camp, where she finds Nick and his closest colleague, Dr. Elliott Hauser.

As Sarah's new calling takes her to other volatile areas, where few people have traveled and even fewer have survived, she discovers that the harsh realities she encounters, and her persistent romantic attraction to the charismatic, unpredictable doctor, ignite in her a burning passion for saving lives, while risking her own in the process. She works for humanitarian and human rights organizations for ten years after first traveling to Ethiopia. At Dr Hauser's urging, she helps with another key shipment blocked by warring factions and corruption, and again finds Nick, now in the border region of Cambodia and Vietnam. Here, she discovers the same nexus of war and refugee suffering but even more tightly bound than in Ethiopia. Khmer Rouge forces terrorize the camp, and Dr. Hauser is killed in a successful effort to free the camp from their grip. Upon her return to London, she gives birth to Nick's daughter and eventually is appointed the regional representative for the United Kingdom for the U.N.H.C.R.

At the same time, Nick now finds himself inevitably caught up in the humanitarian crisis in Chechnya, and goes missing. Sarah realizes she must find him a third time and tell him he is a father, and that she can never forget him. As they desperately escape his captors, she defiantly refuses to abandon him and dies due to a landmine, which Nick survives. The film ends with Nick arriving at Sarah (and Henry's) home in England to meet his young daughter for the first time.

== Cast ==
- Angelina Jolie as Sarah Jordan Beauford
- Clive Owen as Dr. Nick Callahan
- Teri Polo as Charlotte Jordan
- Kate Ashfield as Kat
- Linus Roache as Henry Beauford
- Noah Emmerich as Elliott Hauser
- Yorick van Wageningen as Jan Steiger
- Timothy West as Lawrence Bauford
- Kate Trotter as Mrs. Bauford
- Jonathan Higgins as Philip
- John Gausden as Jimmy Bauford
- Isabelle Horler as Anna Beauford
- Iain Lee as Master of Ceremonies
- Keelan Anthony as Jojo
- John Bourgeois as Rolly
- Kalyane Tea as Steiger's Girlfriend
- Julian Casey as Police Officer
- Norman Mikeal Berketa as Police Officer
- Aidan Pickering as TV Reporter
- Nambitha Mpumlwana as Tula
- Fikile Nyandeni as Gemilla
- Tony Robinow as Art Dealer
- Andrew French as Meles
- Jamie Bartlett as Joss
- Tumisho Masha as Hamadi
- Faye Peters as Monica
- John Matshikiza as Dawit Ningpopo
- Zaa Nkweta as Titus
- Sahajak Boonthanakit as Port Official
- Dennis Tan as Port Official
- Doan Jaroen-Ngarm Mckenzie as Tao
- Burt Kwouk as Colonel Gao
- Teerawat Mulvilai as Ma Sok
- Bertrand A. Henri as Speaker
- Jasmin Geljo as Truck Driver
- Francis X. McCarthy as Strauss
- Manuel Tadros as Chechen Mobster
- Elizabeth Whitmere as Beatrice

== Production ==
Oliver Stone was initially attached as director and producer. Catherine Zeta-Jones, Julia Roberts, and Meg Ryan were considered for the role of Sarah Jordan Beauford, while Kevin Costner and Ralph Fiennes were considered for Dr. Nick Callahan.

The film was shot on location in Thailand, Namibia, and Canada.

== Reception ==
Beyond Borders received unfavorable reviews from critics, as the movie currently holds a 14% "rotten" rating on Rotten Tomatoes based on 102 reviews. Critical consensus on the film has it that "Beyond Borders is good-intentioned, but the use of human suffering as a backdrop for a romance comes across as sanctimonious and exploitative." Metacritic, which uses a weighted average, assigned the film a score of 32 out of 100, based on 31 critics, indicating "generally unfavorable" reviews. Audiences polled by CinemaScore gave the film an average grade of "B+" on an A+ to F scale.

It was nominated for the Political Film Society Award for Peace, losing to Sandstorm. Angelina Jolie received a Golden Raspberry Award for Worst Actress nomination for her performances in this and Lara Croft Tomb Raider: The Cradle of Life, but lost to Jennifer Lopez for Gigli.
