= Geraldine Van Bueren =

British international human rights lawyer

Geraldine Van Bueren is a British international human rights lawyer. She is Professor Emerita of International Human Rights Law at Queen Mary University of London and a barrister.

She is also a visiting Fellow at Kellogg College, Oxford, and a member of Doughty Street Chambers, a barristers' chambers dedicated to human rights advocacy. She holds a Bachelor of Laws (LLB) degree from the University of Wales and a Master of Laws (LLM) from the University of London.

She is one of the original drafters of the United Nations Convention on the Rights of the Child, the most widely ratified human rights treaty. Her book, The International Law on the Rights of the Child has been widely cited by courts around the world. The Council of Europe published her book, Child Rights in Europe — Convergence and Divergence in Judicial Protection, which has also been published in French.

She is an advisor to the René Cassin Foundation, a Jewish human rights organisation. She is working with UNESCO on a project about how law can be used to combat poverty. In October 2020 Amnesty International stated that Van Bueren and Angelina Jolie are preparing a book for children titled Know Your Rights.

== Awards ==
In 2003 she was awarded the Child Rights Lawyer Award. The award, jointly organised by the Law Society, UNICEF and The Lawyer magazine, recognises lawyers who have done outstanding work in the field of children's rights. A profile in The Lawyer describes an incident in which Van Bueren got out of her car in a dangerous area of town to prevent a lynch mob beating a man, which the magazine suggested "encapsulates her fervent commitment to the sanctity of human rights."

== Publications ==
- The International Law on the Rights of the Child (ISBN 0-7923-2687-3)
- Child Rights in Europe — Convergence and Divergence in Judicial Protection (ISBN 92-871-6269-7)
