= Prapaksha Kamboja =

The fourth prince of the Kambojas referenced in the Mahābhārata is the younger brother of the prince Sudakshina Kamboja. In the epic, this prince is simply addressed as Kamboja, but according to Pandit Bhagavadatta Sharma, the real name of the prince was Parpakash Kamboja (Bharata ka Itihaas, p 161).

Prince Kamboja had also participated with distinction in the Kurukshetra War and had fought duels on Kaurava's behalf. After Sudakshina fell on the fourteenth day of the war, the young prince took over the supreme command of the Kamboja division.

== See also ==
- Chandravarma Kamboja
- Kamatha Kamboja
- Sudakshina Kamboja
