= White Marc Bouwer dress of Angelina Jolie =

White dress worn by Angelina Jolie

- Designer: Marc Bouwer
- Year: 2004
- Type: White satin dress
- Material: Silk

American actress Angelina Jolie wore a white satin dress with a plunging neckline designed by Marc Bouwer on February 29, 2004, to the 76th Academy Awards at the Kodak Theatre, where she presented the award for Best Art Direction. The dress garnered praise from fashion magazines and media publications, and has been placed on numerous lists for best Oscars or red carpet fashion.

== Background and design ==
The gown was first presented on the runway during Marc Bouwer's Fall 2004 runway show at New York Fashion Week in New York on February 8, 2004. Actress Angelina Jolie later selected the design with her stylist Jen Rade to wear while presenting at the 76th Academy Awards later that month. The piece is made of silk and features a low-cut neckline with a draped waist, flowing maxi skirt, an open back and fabric draped around the wrists. Jolie paired the look with a diamond ring on her right hand and layers of silver necklaces, including a waterfall piece by H. Stern dubbed as the "Athena Necklace" valued at over $1 million, and a "half-up half-down" hairstyle. She wore a neutral makeup look, emphasizing her eyes with black eyeliner. Jolie wore the dress on February 29, 2004, when presenting the award for Best Art Direction at the 76th Academy Awards hosted at the Kodak Theatre.

== Reception ==
Critical reception to the dress focused on the material and color, describing both as difficult to wear stylishly. Fashion commentators have also cited the gown as part of a broader early-2000s shift toward more minimalist red-carpet dressing. The dress's minimalism and classic aesthetic has consistently been referred to as a defining moment for Jolie's style. It has been described in subsequent years by fashion and celebrity publications as a memorable and stylish selection that was reminiscent of classical Hollywood style.

Since its debut, the dress has been placed on several lists of best Oscars or red carpet fashion. Cosmopolitan magazine picked the dress in 2011 as one of the best Oscar dresses of all time, saying, "Angie's one of very few people who can rock this material and this color — both being mercilessly unforgiving. But the dress drapes on her curves and shows off her assets in all the right ways." Fashion journalist André Leon Talley put it on his list of the 25 best Oscars dresses, published 2012. In 2019, Harper's Bazaar named it one of the 100 best red-carpet dresses. That same year, the dress was one of 25 famous red carpet dresses used in a photo shoot celebrating the 25th anniversary of InStyle magazine. In 2023, Christian Allaire of Vogue selected it as one of the 55 best Oscars dresses; Vogue contributor Christina Liao was quoted calling the dress Jolie's "best look of all time". Vogue further described the dress as "proof that the best looks are the ones that make a subtle and timeless statement". Vogue Australia listed the dress in their list for the "100 best Oscar dresses of all time". L'Officiel described the look as one of Jolie's best, praising it for echoing classic Hollywood glamor and its "sultry air".

In 2024, Sydney Sweeney wore the dress for the Vanity Fair Oscar party following the 96th Academy Awards, over 20 years after Jolie wore it.

== See also ==
- Black Versace dress of Angelina Jolie, which she wore to the 2012 Oscars
- List of individual dresses
