= Marc Bouwer =

South African fashion designer

- Bouwer following his Fall 2008 fashion show in New York City
- Born: July 5, 1959 (age 67); Johannesburg, South Africa
- Other name: Marc Bouwer
- Occupation: fashion designer

Marc Bouwer (born July 5, 1959) is a South African-born fashion designer and costume designer based in New York City. He is known for his eveningwear and for designing for entertainers including Whitney Houston, Shania Twain and Toni Braxton. He is a member of the Council of Fashion Designers of America.

== Early life ==
Bouwer was born in Johannesburg, South Africa. He developed an interest in fashion at a young age and began making dresses as a teenager. He later attended the Art, Ballet and Music School and studied fashion design under Archie Leggat. In 1978, while studying fashion, he won the South African Vogue Young Designers Award.

== Career ==
Bouwer moved to New York City in 1980 to pursue a career in fashion. He worked as a draper for Halston before designing sweaters for Clovis Ruffin.. After working for Halston and Clovis Ruffin, Bouwer began developing eveningwear under his own name. By 1983, Women's Wear Daily reported that his namesake line had grown into a $2 million business within two years, with clients including Victoria Principal, Lesley Ann Warren and Dinah Shore. His designs were sold through major American retailers, including Saks Fifth Avenue, and his work was noted for its fluid draping and use of fabrics including cashmere and matte jersey. In 1984, Bouwer was commissioned to design clothing for Morgan Fairchild for the television series Paper Dolls. Among his early clients was Raquel Welch, whose preference for more form-fitting clothing influenced Bouwer's development toward the body-conscious designs that became associated with his work.By the late 1980s, his work had become associated with body-conscious silhouettes and stretch fabrics; a 1987 Los Angeles Times profile described his approach as "nouvelle couture" and reported that his line was carried by Neiman Marcus and Giorgio. In 1988, The New York Times singled out a black sequined Bouwer dress as "the evening's sensation" at a New York Academy of Art benefit.

In 1990, Bouwer launched Marc Bouwer Couture with business partner Paul Margolin. During the 1990s, Bouwer became increasingly associated with dressing performers and other public figures, developing long-term working relationships with clients including Whitney Houston, Toni Braxton and Patti Labelle.

Contemporary fashion coverage documented Bouwer's runway collections in New York during the mid-1990s. Reviewing the Fall 1995 collections, The Times fashion writer Sharon Schlegel described Bouwer's show as a "sexy, elegant collection" and noted its body-conscious eveningwear. The following year, the South Florida Sun Sentinel included Bouwer in its coverage of the Fall 1996 New York collections, noting the collection's tailored suits, velvet bodysuits and gowns. Bouwer's relationships with celebrity clients also extended to his runway presentations. In 1997, Toni Braxton walked in his New York fashion show wearing a black evening gown. In 1998, Pamela Anderson attended Bouwer's Fall 1998 fashion show in New York after choosing him to help change her image; her appearance drew intense press attention, with the New York Daily News describing a "paparazzi riot" and Paper reporting an unusually aggressive crowd of photographers when she arrived. The collection featured Nigerian model Oluchi Onweagba, with Femina reporting that Bouwer was the first New York designer to feature the Face of Africa winner on the runway.

In 1998, Bouwer designed the ice-blue velvet dress worn by Michelle Kwan for her free-skating program at the 1998 Winter Olympics in Nagano. Kwan later said that she wanted the dress to be simple and to reflect the spirituality and purity of her program, which was set to Lyra Angelica.

In 2000, Bouwer designed the costume worn by Heidi Klum to her first Halloween party, the beginning of what became her annual Halloween event. He also designed Klum's Lady Godiva costume for the following year's party.

In 2001, a black dress by Bouwer was worn by Julianne Moore as Clarice Starling in Hannibal. Women's Wear Daily reported that Moore herself suggested Bouwer for the film.

Bouwer presented his Fall 2004 collection at Bryant Park during New York Fashion Week. Reviewing the collection, Robert Janjigian of the Palm Beach Daily News described its focus on cocktail and evening wear, noting its body-conscious silhouettes and use of lace, velvet and chiffon.

In 2004, Angelina Jolie wore a white satin gown by Bouwer to the 76th Academy Awards. The gown was later included by Vogue among André Leon Talley's selections of notable Oscar dresses.

In 2005, Bouwer expanded into the mass market with M by Marc Bouwer, a lower-priced line for QVC. During his first appearance on the network that March, a collection of approximately 20,000 items sold out in 37 minutes.

In 2006, Bouwer launched Marc Bouwer GlamIt!, a lower-priced diffusion line of eveningwear. By 2008, The Wall Street Journal reported that the two-year-old line was approaching $15 million in wholesale sales, with growing demand from international retailers.

In 2008, amid the economic downturn, Bouwer began experimenting with virtual fashion shows as a less costly alternative to conventional runway presentations. The Wall Street Journal reported that he tested the format in February and presented another collection by webcast during New York Fashion Week that September. The format also substantially reduced presentation costs, with the webcast costing approximately $60,000 to $75,000 to produce, compared with at least $200,000 for a conventional runway show. His use of the format was later documented in American Runway: 75 Years of Fashion and the Front Row, which credited Bouwer with hosting the first virtual fashion show in 2009. For his Fall 2010 virtual presentation, Bouwer featured Candice Swanepoel in a fashion film shot against a green screen. In February 2011, Bouwer presented his Fall 2011 collection as a virtual 3D fashion show featuring model Selita Ebanks.

In 2012, Beyoncé wore a Marc Bouwer gown for her performance of "I Was Here" at the United Nations General Assembly in support of World Humanitarian Day.

Beginning in 2014, Bouwer developed an ongoing custom-design relationship with actress Laverne Cox. For Cox's first Primetime Emmy Awards appearance that year, he created a custom white gown by draping the design directly on her during fittings. Cox continued to wear Bouwer's designs, with her stylist Christina Pacelli describing their work together in 2016 as a one-on-one custom process in which Bouwer draped designs directly on Cox.

In 2014, Bouwer launched Marc Bouwer Unlimited, a lower-priced casual collection, on ShopHQ, which was subsequently renamed EVINE Live. In 2017, Women's Wear Daily described Marc Bouwer Unlimited as the company's more affordable and casual collection and reported that it was continuing to grow.

In 2019, after years of designing wedding gowns for individual clients, Bouwer launched his first full bridal collection. The ten-piece collection was offered by appointment and was positioned at a lower price point than his signature customized gowns.

Beginning in 2025, Bouwer developed an ongoing design relationship with model and content creator Haley Kalil, who has worn both existing Bouwer designs and custom gowns created for her red-carpet appearances. In 2025, Bouwer created a custom gown for Kalil for the premiere of Wicked: For Good, documented by Paper in a behind-the-scenes feature. Their relationship continued into 2026, with Kalil wearing Bouwer for red-carpet appearances including the Golden Globe Awards.

=== Whitney Houston ===
Bouwer developed a long-running design relationship with Whitney Houston, creating stage and performance clothing for the singer. By 1997, People reported that Houston owned approximately 500 of his designs. Bouwer also designed the gown Houston wore for her 1992 wedding to Bobby Brown. The Victoria and Albert Museum has noted that Bouwer's stage designs for Houston were constructed to accommodate the physical demands of performance, including freedom of movement and avoiding pressure around the singer's diaphragm and vocal cords. The collaboration also included the black embellished gown Houston wore to the 36th Annual Grammy Awards in 1994, where she received three awards, including Record of the Year for "I Will Always Love You". Originally designed for a Houston concert in South Africa, the gown was later included in the Victoria and Albert Museum's DIVA exhibition. The museum has described Bouwer's relationship with Houston as a long-term collaboration.

=== Toni Braxton ===
Bouwer developed an ongoing design relationship with Toni Braxton during the 1990s after Braxton became a client by purchasing one of his designs at Saks Fifth Avenue. Their collaboration gained particular attention during the 1997 awards season. Bouwer designed the revealing dress Braxton wore to the American Music Awards and the white gown she wore the following month to the 39th Annual Grammy Awards. USA Today profiled Bouwer in connection with the two looks, while The Sun prominently featured Braxton in its Grammy coverage under the phrase "Toni Braxton wore it."

Braxton also walked in Bouwer's 1997 New York fashion show. Their collaboration later extended to music-video styling. For Braxton's 2000 video for "Spanish Guitar", Bouwer designed a fuchsia swimsuit and a scarlet gown and also served as stylist on the Los Angeles set.

=== Shania Twain ===
Bouwer developed a long-term creative collaboration with Shania Twain beginning in the late 1990s. After working with her on the video for "From This Moment On", he became Twain's image director and continued designing and styling her for subsequent music videos.

For the video for "That Don't Impress Me Much", Bouwer conceived Twain's hooded leopard-print look, while for "Man! I Feel Like a Woman!" he created the gender-reversing costume based on the visual concept of Robert Palmer's "Addicted to Love" video. The collaboration extended beyond music videos to Twain's stage and public appearances. Bouwer dressed her for events including VH1 Divas Live and the 1999 Grammy Awards, where she wore a white gown by Bouwer while accepting two awards.

Bouwer later designed costumes for Twain's Still the One residency at Caesars Palace, which opened in 2012. He continued working with Twain on her Let's Go! Las Vegas residency, which opened in 2019, designing eight costumes for the production. In 2022, Bouwer reunited with Twain for the music video for "Waking Up Dreaming", which Women's Wear Daily described as their eighth video collaboration over 25 years.

=== Archival dressing ===
In 2022, Kelsea Ballerini wore the Marc Bouwer gown originally worn by Shania Twain to the 1999 Grammy Awards when Ballerini attended the ACM Honors, where Twain was being honored.

In 2023, Kerry Washington wore a red velvet Marc Bouwer gown originally made for Whitney Houston in 1996 to the American Black Film Festival Honors. Her stylist, Law Roach, sourced the gown from Bouwer's archive; Houston had previously worn it to a BET Walk of Fame gala.

In 2024, Sydney Sweeney wore the same white satin Marc Bouwer gown that Angelina Jolie had worn to the 76th Academy Awards in 2004. Working with stylist Molly Dickson, Sweeney wore the archival gown to the Vanity Fair Oscar Party, twenty years after Jolie's original appearance.

== Animal-free fashion ==
In 2002, Bouwer presented a faux-fur collection during New York Fashion Week with the support of PETA. ELLE South Africa reported that the Fall 2002 collection used faux fur in place of animal fur, including on collars and full-length coats.

In 2007, Bouwer again presented a PETA-sponsored collection, which the organization described as animal-free.

Bouwer has received honors for his animal-free fashion work, including the PETA Humanitarian Award and the Humane Society's Compassion in Fashion Award.

== Television appearances ==
Title	Role	Notes	Year
Not Just A Girl : Shania Twain	Himself	Documentary	2022
Blue Bloods	Himself	Season 1, episode 19	2011
Project Runway	Guest Judge	Season 6, episode 4	2009
Ebony Fashion Fair: 50 Years of Style	Himself	TV movie	2008
I Am an Animal: The Story of Ingrid Newkirk and PETA	Himself	Documentary	2007
Miss Universe 2007	Judge	TV special	2007
CMT: The Greatest- 20 Sexiest Videos of 2006	Himself	TV special	2006
The Apprentice U.S.	Team Designer	Season 5, episode 13	2006
CMT: Greatest Moments: Shania Twain	Himself	TV special	2006
Paris Hilton: Not So Simple	Himself	TV documentary	2005
America's Next Top Model	Designer, Go-See Challenge	Cycle 3, episode 7	2004
Miss Universe 2001	Judge	TV special	2001
The Rush Hour with Annika Pergament	Fashion commentator	Recurring red-carpet coverage	2024–present
