= Black Versace dress of Angelina Jolie =

Black dress worn by Angelina Jolie

- Designer: Versace
- Year: 2012
- Type: Strapless black dress
- Material: Velvet

American actress Angelina Jolie wore a black dress on February 26, 2012, to the 84th Academy Awards at the Hollywood and Highland Center, where she presented the Academy Award for Best Adapted Screenplay. Jolie's gown was styled by Jen Rade and created by Versace, a frequent dresser of Jolie on the red carpet. The strapless velvet piece gained praise from media publications, and is considered one of the most memorable dresses in fashion history. The look also spurred several internet memes surrounding Jolie's posing, and became a significant moment in pop culture.

== Background and design ==
In the 2000s black dresses were a frequent choice of Jolie who has also a long relationship with Versace. In 2005, Jolie wore a plunging Versace black leather gown for the Mr. & Mrs. Smith premiere. The gown featured a sheer black neckline trim and lining that billowed from a thigh-high slit, as well as long vertical seams down the front and an open back with two crisscrossed straps. That dress became widely considered one of Jolie’s best choices.

Jolie attended the 2012 Academy Awards alongside then-fiancée Brad Pitt, who was nominated for the Best Actor accolade following his performance in Moneyball (2011). Jolie was regarded to be a trendsetter on the red carpet, and was attributed to awards season trends of light and "icy" colours after her white Versace gown at the 2012 Golden Globes. She was interpreted to have dressed more conservatively since her directorial debut in the film In the Land of Blood and Honey (2011); after choosing more serious hues during previous award shows in 2012, The Hollywood Reporter speculated Jolie choosing something bolder or colorful for the Oscars. Jolie originally had a "more complicated" dress in mind, but preferred the black gown as she felt more comfortable and more like herself. The dress was custom-made by Versace, a frequent collaborator of Jolie's, and was styled by Jen Rade. Jolie reportedly made the decision by labelling pieces of paper with the choices and picking them out of a hat with her family.

The dress is a strapless black deep velvet gown, with sculptural neckline ruffles, a bustle, two diamond clips, a wraparound belt around an asymmetrical bodice, and a dramatic thigh-high slit. Jolie paired the look with simple accessories, including a voluminous wave hairstyle, red lipstick, Neil Lane jewelry, a clutch by Jaime Mascaro, and peep-toe platform heels by Salvatore Ferragamo. Pitt wore a complementary black tuxedo by Tom Ford. Jolie and Pitt were one of the last arrivals on the red carpet preceding the ceremony, with Jolie being photographed posing with a hand on her hip and an "exaggerated leg pop". During the Oscars, Jolie presented the Academy Award for Best Adapted Screenplay while wearing the gown. She posed similarly onstage, prompting winners Alexander Payne, Jim Rash and Nat Faxon, writers of The Descendants (2011), to mimic her pose while accepting the statuette.

== Reception and legacy ==
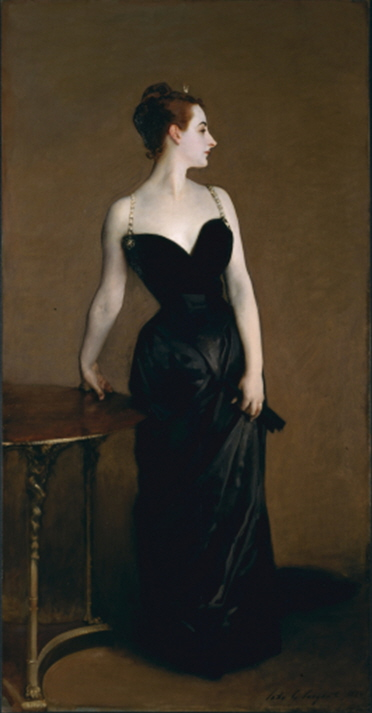
Numerous critics compared the dress to John Singer Sargent's Portrait of Madame X

After the ceremony, Jolie's dress gained traction across fashion blogs. The gown has been referred to as iconic by magazines Vogue and Marie Claire. Vogue wrote that Jolie "made fashion history that evening" and noted that a decade later, black gowns with leg slits were still in fashion. After Jolie's appearance at the awards, Susan Cernek from Glamour wrote that the dress influenced subsequent fall trends for black skirts and ballgowns. Jolie was also credited with popularizing high slits in 2012 celebrity fashion. Town & Country classified the piece among Jolie's most iconic looks, while The Telegraph listed it as one of the "Versace dresses that changed fashion history". Elle speculated that Versace would subsequently design Jolie's wedding gown; the designer did create the dress upon her marriage to Pitt in 2014, which The Guardian commented resembled Jolie's 2012 dress in its simplicity and style. Magazines Marie Claire, Harper's Bazaar and Glamour included the ensemble on its list of best looks of that year's Academy Awards, and USA Today and Entertainment Weekly listed the gown as one of the five style moments of 2012.

Photographs of Jolie's pose later became an internet sensation, spurring jokes and viral memes that featured photoshopped images of her leg. The pictures inspired an eponymous parody Twitter account, @AngiesRightLeg, to acquire 500,000 followers. Jolie responded that she "didn't really pay attention" to media coverage surrounding herself. In 2019, Glamour's Charlie Teather cited Jolie's look with making leg poses, dubbed the "Angelina leg", fashionable on the red carpet. Grace Back of Marie Claire wrote that both the virality and the gown, "to this day, remain ingrained in the minds of pop culture fans everywhere".

PopSugar wrote that the actress's ensemble was "anything but basic" and communicated "Hollywood royalty with elegance and ease", while The Daily Beast deemed the gown "a bit of a snooze". Writing for the Los Angeles Times, Michael Darling remarked that Jolie had "stolen the show" at the awards. Vogue editor André Leon Talley commented that the dress was "super-sexy with a huge slash, totally eighties Versace style". Maura Judkis of The Washington Post noted that the design of the dress stuck to Jolie's "slightly" Gothy roots. Writing for The New Yorker, Judith Thurman stated that the gown "resembled tulip-petals" and "show(ed) off her legs to die for", deeming Jolie the best-dressed at the ceremony. The Guardian remarked that Jolie resembled an archetypal film star, with a confident "sophisticated and bedroomy" piece and the absence of major accessories. The New Yorker, The Guardian, and Forbes compared the look to John Singer Sargent's Portrait of Madame X. Elizabeth Snead for The Hollywood Reporter wrote that the actress "sizzled like a young starlet" and "worked that slit like a red-carpet pro for the photographers".

== See also ==
- White Marc Bouwer dress of Angelina Jolie
- List of individual dresses
