= Zaa Nkweta =

Cameroonian-Canadian journalist

- Born: 1969
- Occupations: Television presenter, Journalist

Zaa Nkweta is a Cameroonian-Canadian journalist, actor and television presenter born in the United Kingdom and raised in Canada. Nkweta received his undergraduate degree in English from McGill University, a postgraduate journalism diploma from Rhodes University and a master's degree in data and investigative journalism from the University of King's College. He is also a graduate of Ashbury College in Rockliffe Park, Ottawa, and attended the National Theatre School of Canada, training under Pierre Lefevre and Dame Peggy Ashcroft. He has acted in numerous feature films and television shows. His big budget credits include Ali and Beyond Borders.

== Between the Lines ==
Nkweta hosted the first South African literary television program Between the Lines in 1999. He has conducted communications workshops with the South African Department of Trade and Industry, BHP Billiton and Interbrand Services. Stories that Nkweta has presented that have won awards include "Crude", which won an SAB Environmental Award of Merit in 2001, and "Animals and the Law", which won an International Genesis Media Award in 2005.

== Carte Blanche ==
Nkweta was an anchorman and field reporter for South Africa's highly acclaimed investigative TV program Carte Blanche. Nkweta also anchored the pan-African version of the show, broadcast to 44 African countries as well as the United States. Highlights at Carte Blanche include stories covering the World Summit on Sustainable Development in Johannesburg in 2002, medical fraud in Johannesburg, oil sabotage in Nigeria, oil corruption in Equatorial Guinea, and The Taiping Four Gorillas of Cameroon. Nkweta has interviewed the president of Equatorial Guinea, the chairman of De Beers Mines; Nicky Oppenheimer, and the Secretary General of the African Union (2001–2002) Amara Essy. He has an interest in the arts, having interviewed several notable actors such as Helen Mirren, Charlize Theron, Will Smith and singer Shania Twain.

== Canada ==
Nkweta was a producer and anchorman for The Real News in Toronto, Ontario, from 2006 to 2009. Stories on South African politics, the political crises in Zimbabwe, Kenya, Gaza, Pakistan and Iraq are some of the highlights of his body of work. Nkweta lectured in journalism at Wilfrid Laurier University's Brantford Campus during the academic year 2011–12. He was the Line Producer of the first season of the Emmy-Award-winning real time interactive web thriller Guidestones.
