= Srindra Varmana =

Srindra Varmana according to the Skanda Purana was a king of the Kamboja kingdom. He is said to have installed the image of Varahadeva in his capital and made a gold throne for it.

== See also ==
- Chandravarma Kamboja
- Kamatha Kamboja
- Sudakshina Kamboja
