= Kambu (disambiguation) =

Kambu may refer to:

- Kambu Swayambhuva, the ancient Indian sage
- The Tamil name of pearl millet
- Kambu, an ethnic group in Nigeria, see e.g. List of languages in Nigeria
- Kambu, a place in Kibwezi Constituency, Kenya

== Places in Iran ==
- Kambu, Hormozgan

== See also ==
- Kamboja (disambiguation)
