= Kayden's Law =

2022 U.S. federal law on child custody and abuse cases

Kayden's Law, formally known as the Keeping Children Safe from Family Violence Act, is a United States federal law enacted in March 2022 as part of the Violence Against Women Act (VAWA) reauthorization. The legislation is named in memory of seven-year-old Kayden Mancuso of Bucks County, Pennsylvania, who was fatally beaten by her father during unsupervised custody time, granted by a court over her mother's objections despite evidence of his violent history.

== Legislative provisions ==
Kayden's Law, incorporated into VAWA and signed by President Joe Biden on March 16, 2022, establishes reforms in child custody proceedings involving allegations of abuse or violence:

1. Federal incentives for states: States that pass laws restricting court-ordered reunification treatments, strengthening child safety in custody cases, and improving evidentiary and procedural standards become eligible for additional STOP Grant funding.
2. Restrictions on reunification therapy: Courts are barred from ordering reunification programs that lack peer-reviewed evidence of safety and effectiveness, especially those requiring separation from a safe parent without mutual agreement.
3. Qualifications for expert witnesses: Expert testimony must be provided by professionals with documented experience and training in domestic violence or child abuse.
4. Mandatory training for judges and court staff: Continuing education must address topics including coercive control, child trauma, implicit bias, and the long-term effects of abuse.
5. Enhanced consideration of abuse in custody rulings: Courts must give significant weight to documented abuse when making custody determinations.

== Implementation by state ==
Because family law is governed primarily at the state level, Kayden's Law does not automatically change state statutes. Instead, it conditions certain federal grant eligibility on adopting laws consistent with its provisions.

- California: Adopted Piqui's Law (2023), which mirrors many of Kayden's Law's provisions, including mandatory judicial training and restrictions on reunification programs.
- Colorado: Enacted legislation requiring courts to prioritize child safety in custody disputes, mandate domestic violence training for judges, and regulate the use of reunification therapy.
- Maryland: Passed reforms in 2024 aligning expert witness standards and abuse evaluation requirements with Kayden's Law.
- Tennessee: Implemented statutory restrictions on court-ordered reunification programs lacking scientific support.
- Utah: Updated custody statutes in 2024 to require additional judicial training and stricter criteria for ordering reunification therapy.

Several other states have introduced bills modeled on Kayden's Law, but not all have enacted them into law as of 2025.

== Significance ==
Kayden's Law represents a shift in federal policy toward prioritizing child safety over parental reunification in abuse-related custody disputes. It is among the first federal statutes to link family court practices to eligibility for domestic violence grant funding.

== See also ==
- Violence Against Women Act
- Child custody laws in the United States
- Domestic violence in the United States
- Reunification therapy
