= Kampuchea (disambiguation) =

Kampuchea is Cambodia, a country located in Mainland Southeast Asia.

Kampuchea may also refer to:

== Places ==
- Kingdom of Kampuchea (1945), a puppet state of the Japanese Empire during World War II
- Democratic Kampuchea, an extremist state that existed from 1975 to 1979
- People's Republic of Kampuchea, a communist state that existed from 1979 to 1989

== Organisations ==
- Kampuchea Revolutionary Army, the armed forces of Democratic Kampuchea
- People's Revolutionary Youth Union of Kampuchea, a youth organisation that existed in Cambodia

=== Political parties ===
- Communist Party of Kampuchea, a communist party that existed in Cambodia from 1951 to 1981
- Party of Democratic Kampuchea, a political party that existed in Cambodia from 1981 to 1993

== See also ==
- Kampuchea Krom (lit. 'Lower Cambodia'), a region consisting the Mekong Delta and Southeast region of Vietnam
- Cambodian (disambiguation)
- Kamboja (disambiguation)
- Kombucha, a fermented beverage
