= Kambiz Vafai =

Engineer, inventor, academic and author

- Occupations: Mechanical engineer, inventor, academic and author

Academic background
- Education: BS., Mechanical Engineering; MS., Mechanical Engineering; PhD., Mechanical Engineering
- Alma mater: University of Minnesota, Minneapolis; University of California, Berkeley

Kambiz Vafai is a mechanical engineer, inventor, academic and author. He has taken on the roles of Distinguished Professor of Mechanical Engineering and the Director of Bourns College of Engineering Online Master-of-Science in Engineering Program at the University of California, Riverside.

Vafai is most known for his pioneering work in phenomenological description, modeling and analysis for single and multiphase transport through porous media. He is a highly ranked scholar on Research.com and ScholarGPS and has been named in Elsevier/Stanford's list of World's Top 2% Scientists multiple times. His publications include journal articles and books such as Porous Media: Applications in Biological Systems and Biotechnology and the Handbook of Porous Media. Additionally, he is the recipient of the 75th Anniversary Medal of American Society of Mechanical Engineers (ASME) Heat Transfer Division in 2013, the 2006 ASME Memorial Award, and the 2011 International Society of Porous Media (InterPore) Honorary Lifetime Membership Award.

Vafai is a Fellow of the American Society of Mechanical Engineers (ASME), the American Association for Advancement of Science (AAAS), the World Innovation Foundation, and Associate Fellow of American Institute of Aeronautics and Astronautics (AIAA). He has taken on the roles of Editor-in-Chief of the Journal of Porous Media and Special Topics and Reviews in Porous Media, Editor of International Journal of Heat and Mass Transfer and has held positions on the Editorial Advisory Board of the International Journal of Heat and Mass Transfer, International Communications in Heat and Mass Transfer, Numerical Heat Transfer Journal, International Journal of Numerical Methods for Heat and Fluid Flow, Experimental Heat Transfer Journal, and editorial board of the International Journal of Heat and Fluid Flow.

== Education ==
Vafai graduated with a Bachelor of Science in Mechanical Engineering from the University of Minnesota, Minneapolis in 1972, and went on to earn a Master of Science in 1977 and a PhD in 1980 from the University of California, Berkeley. Following this, he became a Postdoctoral Fellow in Mechanical Engineering at Harvard University from 1980 to 1981.

== Career ==
Vafai began his academic career as an assistant professor at The Ohio State University in 1981, later becoming associate professor in 1986 and Professor in 1991. In 2000, he joined the University of California, Riverside as a Presidential Chair Professor, and was appointed Distinguished Professor in the Department of Mechanical Engineering in 2014.

Vafai took on the position of Director of Bourns College of Engineering Online Master-of-Science in Engineering Program at the University of California, Riverside in 2015.

Vafai provided consulting services to various companies and laboratories and engaged in research collaborations with several countries. He also served as a Principal or Co-principal Investigator and led research projects funded by organizations such as the National Science Foundation (NSF) Aircraft Brake Systems Corporation (ABSC), BFGoodrich, Bell Labs and the Department of Energy (DOE).

== Research ==
Vafai has contributed to the field of mechanical engineering by studying heat and mass transfer and fluid mechanics, particularly focusing on porous media transport, natural convection, condensation, multiphase transport, aircraft brake housing heat transfer, electronic cooling and biomedical applications.

== Works ==
Vafai has published works on the use of porous media and heat transfer, along with many book chapters and symposium volumes across different subjects. He edited the first, second and third editions of the Handbook of Porous Media, which compiled research on heat and mass transfer in porous media, covering topics like applied models, forced convection, and advancements in fundamental and applied research. In related research, his book, Porous Media: Applications in Biological Systems and Biotechnology, explored the applications of biomedical fields, showcasing collaborations among scientists and engineers to address challenges and potential advancements in biological systems.

=== Porous media ===
Vafai's research on porous media focused on fluid flow, heat transfer and mass transfer. He pioneered the analysis of fundamental aspects in the study of fluid flow and heat transfer through a saturated porous medium. He also lent to the understanding of non-equilibrium heat and mass transfer in porous media and the thermal interactions between solid and fluid phases. His works included a comprehensive review and simulation of multiphase transport through porous media, where key principles regarding local thermal equilibrium, dimensionality effects, and phase change effects were established.

In a paper that introduced the Vafai number in Physics of Fluids, the Darcy–Bénard convection in a porous medium was examined incorporating phase-lag effects to derive an extended model to gain insights into the transition from local thermal non-equilibrium to equilibrium.

=== Biomedical applications ===
Vafai has been engaged in biomedical applications, including the simulation of macromolecule transport through arteries, the study of biofilms, and the utilization of magnetic resonance imaging for early brain stroke detection. He contributed to developing biosensors for biological detection and modeling tissues and organs and introduced a four-layer model for LDL transport in arterial walls, discussing its effectiveness in checking atherosclerosis initiation under different conditions. Additionally, he holds patents for research in initiating control over flow, heat, and mass transfer inside thin film fluidic cells to mitigate flow and thermal disturbances on sensor surfaces. He devised a Rapid Microfluidic Thermal Cycler for Nucleic Acid amplification using a microfluidic heat exchanger and porous medium, alongside a method and system for noninvasive treatment of neurodegenerative disorders through magnetothermal stimulation of neuron cells in the brain.

Vafai led the establishment of a thorough simulation of biofilms incorporating the involved physical issues, investigating biofilm resistance to biocide treatment, considering physical attributes and providing correlations to predict microbial survival. He examined how biofilm formation alters porosity and permeability in porous matrices using multispecies biofilm models and a modified Kozeny-Carman framework, focusing on Pseudomonas aeruginosa, and developed a multidimensional, multispecies, heterogeneous biofilm model using balance equations, exploring the effects of changing biofilm surface geometries and porous media conditions. In a paper with Sara Abdelsalam that received an honorable mention for the Bellman Prize-Elsevier (2020–2021), he pointed out the influence of Womersley number and occlusion on flow characteristics in small blood arteries, providing insights into the Segré–Silberberg effect.

=== Flat-shaped heat pipes and microchannels ===
Vafai studied heat pipes and microchannels to assess their heat transfer capabilities. His research group has found that flat-shaped heat pipes outperform cylindrical ones, especially in adapting to various geometries, ideal for asymmetrical heating/cooling in electronics and spacecraft where cylindrical pipes struggle with limited heat sources and sink use. He analyzed multichannel heat pipes for the first time and established that flat-shaped heat pipes substantially improve heat dissipation, offer higher heat transfer capabilities, and provide multiple condensate return paths, thus overcoming prospect of a dry out condition crucial for managing high heat transfer applications. Furthermore, he demonstrated that flat-shaped heat pipes create surfaces with minimal temperature variations, eliminating hot spots and ensuring uniform component temperatures, making them valuable for maintaining consistent operating conditions for electronic components. He also came up for the first time with the concept and detailed evaluation of disk-shaped heat pipes which have an even higher heat removal capability.

In a joint study with Lu Zhu, Vafai proposed for the first time, the design and implementation of double and multi-layer microchannels, aiming to alleviate two primary drawbacks of these devices which are high-temperature gradients and the amount of required pumping power.

=== Buoyancy induced flows ===
Vafai has conducted research on the interrelationship between Nusselt number oscillations, temperature distribution, fluid flow patterns, and vortex dynamics. He has identified various cell structures within moderate and narrow gap annuli, including the existence of an odd number of cells for the first time, and distinct flow structures and heat transfer characteristics, including spiral vortex secondary flow and transverse vortices, which provide quantitative descriptions of three-dimensional convection patterns and unicellular flow development in buoyancy-induced convection. Looking into buoyancy-driven convection in an open-ended cavity, he underscored the importance of irregular vortex behavior and the limitations of two-dimensional assumptions in transient flow and temperature fields.

Vafai provided a detailed and thorough review of free surface flows with and without the presence of a porous medium through modeling, experimentation, and finite difference and finite element simulations. He collaborated with S.C. Chen to research various aspects of free surface transport phenomena in porous media, including the effects of surface tension, comparative analysis of numerical methods, experimental investigation of transport within hollow glass ampules, and momentum and energy transport. They proposed novel analytical and numerical methods, giving insights for applications such as glass processing and optical fiber production.

=== Electronic cooling ===
Vafai and his students and his research scholars have conducted research on the 3D integrated circuit, introducing optimized thermal performance through integrated double-layer microchannels (DLMC) and multi-layer microchannels (MLMC). He assessed key attributes of a 3D integrated chip structure, including critical features such as substrate size, heat sink, device layer, through silicon vias (TSVs), thermal interface material (TIM), and the arrangement of core processors and TSVs. In addition, he conducted in-depth study of the variation of thermal conductivity, total heat dissipation, and power distribution within the device layers and core processors and showed the effects of varying features of the 3D Integrated Circuit (IC) structure on thermal hotspots, along with an optimization route for hotspot reduction.

Vafai has been granted US patents related to the innovative 3D chip cooling, the configuration of a thin film microchannel to result in less coolant flow, and enhanced thin film cooling through flexible complex seals in response to temperature or thermal load increases and electronic cooling. Furthermore, his inventions encompass devices with multi-compartment fluidic cells, flexible seals, and complex seals with closed cavities, aimed at controlling fluid flow rates, enhancing insulation properties, and regulating thermal conditions.

== Awards and honors ==
- 1999 - Classic Paper Award, ASME Heat Transfer Division
- 2006 – Heat Transfer Memorial Award, ASME
- 2011 – Honorary Lifetime Membership Award, International Society of Porous Media (InterPore)
- 2013 – 75th Anniversary Medal, ASME Heat Transfer Division

== Bibliography ==
=== Selected books ===
- Porous Media: Applications in Biological Systems and Biotechnology (2010) ISBN 978-1-4200-6541-1
- Handbook of Porous Media, third edition (2015) ISBN 978-1-4398-8554-3
- Heat Transfer Enhancement with Nanofluids (2015) ISBN 978-1-4822-5400-6
- Convective Heat Transfer in Porous Media (2019) ISBN 978-0-367-03080-3
- The Role of Nanofluids in Renewable Energy Engineering (2023) ISBN 978-3-0365-9382-1

=== Selected articles ===
- Vafai, K., & Tien, C. L. (1981). Boundary and inertia effects on flow and heat transfer in porous media. International Journal of Heat and Mass Transfer, 24(2), 195–203.
- Amiri, A., & Vafai, K. (1994). Analysis of dispersion effects and non-thermal equilibrium, non-Darcian, variable porosity incompressible flow through porous media. International journal of heat and mass transfer, 37(6), 939–954.
- Khanafer, K., Vafai, K., & Lightstone, M. (2003). Buoyancy-driven heat transfer enhancement in a two-dimensional enclosure utilizing nanofluids. International journal of heat and mass transfer, 46(19), 3639–3653.
- Khaled, A. R., & Vafai, K. (2003). The role of porous media in modeling flow and heat transfer in biological tissues. International Journal of Heat and Mass Transfer, 46(26), 4989–5003.
- Khanafer, K., & Vafai, K. (2017). A critical synthesis of thermophysical characteristics of nanofluids. In Nanotechnology and energy (pp. 279–332). Jenny Stanford Publishing.
- Fazeli, K., & Vafai, K. (2024). Analysis of optimized combined microchannel and heat pipes for electronics cooling. International Journal of Heat and Mass Transfer, 219, 1–15.
