= Kamatha =

Kamatha is a Kamboja king mentioned in the Mahābhārata as one of the principal Kshatriyas taking part in the battle.

== See also ==
- Srindra Varmana Kamboj
- Chandravarma
- Sudakshina
