= Kambiz Norouzi =

Iranian lawyer and professor

Kambiz Norouzi (کامبیز نوروزی in Persian) is a lawyer and university professor. He is also a legal advisor of the Association of Iranian Journalists, in which role he spoke out against the closure of newspapers in 2002, and lecturer at Center of Media Education in Iran.

== Arrest and imprisonment ==
Norouzi was arrested during the protests following the disputed June 2009 Iranian presidential election, and in November 2009 was sentenced to two years imprisonment and 74 lashes for conspiracy against national security, spreading anti-government propaganda and disrupting public order.

== 2025–2026 protests ==
In light of the 2025–2026 Iranian protests, Norouzi was among the signatories of a letter condemning the arrest of reformist and opposition figures such as Azar Mansouri, Ebrahim Asgharzadeh, Ali Shakouri-Rad, Abdollah Momeni, and Mehdi Mahmoudian, and also the issuance of long prison sentences for figures such as Narges Mohammadi. It also called for a transitional council to govern Iran in place of the Islamic government.
