= Cambyses =

Cambyses may refer to:

- Cambyses I, King of Anshan 600 to 559 BCE
- Cambyses II, King of Persia 530 to 522 BCE
- Cambyses, ancient name of the Iori river in the South Caucasus
- Cambyses Romance, a c. 7th century prose narrative
- Cambyses, a tragedy (published 1569) by Thomas Preston
- Cambyses, King of Persia, a 1671 play
- Qambeez (Cambyses), a tragedy in Arabic by Ahmed Shawqi
- Kambyses, protagonist in Felix Salten's novel The Hound of Florence

== See also ==
- Kamboja (disambiguation)
- Cambysene, a historic region
