= Genbu =

Genbu may refer to:

- Black Tortoise, a Chinese constellation symbol
- Genbu (YuYu Hakusho), a fictional character in the series YuYu Hakusho
- Genbu (Fushigi Yūgi), a fictional character in the series Fushigi Yūgi
- Genbu, a fictional monster in the MMORPG Final Fantasy XI.
- Genbu Kururugi, a fictional character in the series Code Geass
- Genbu, the guardian of the North Gate of The Imperial Palace in the series Accel World
