= Marilyn Lightstone (engineer) =

Canadian mechanical engineer

Marilyn Lightstone is a Canadian mechanical engineer specializing in the computational fluid dynamics of thermofluids, including the simulation of droplets and particles in turbulent flows, the use of thermofluids in solar energy, and thermal energy storage. She is a professor of mechanical engineering at McMaster University, and the former chair of the McMaster Department of Mechanical Engineering.

== Education and career ==
Lightstone went into engineering following a childhood interest in solar energy. She received a bachelor's degree from Queen's University at Kingston in 1985. She continued her studies at the University of Waterloo, where she received a master's degree in 1987 and completed her Ph.D. in 1992. Her work at Waterloo was supervised by George Raithby and Terry Hollands.

She worked for three years at Atomic Energy of Canada Limited, in nuclear thermal hydraulics, before returning to academia as a faculty member at the University of Waterloo in 1995, with the support of an NSERC Women's Faculty Award. In 1999 she moved to McMaster University. There, she served two terms as department chair, from 2013 to 2023, becoming the first female engineering department chair at the university.

== Recognition ==
Lightstone was elected as a Fellow of the Canadian Society for Mechanical Engineering in 2017, and as a Fellow of the Canadian Academy of Engineering in 2024.
