= Sudakshina =

Mahabharata character

Information
- Family: Prapaksha (brother)

Sudakshina (Sanskrit: सुदक्षिण, romanized: Sudakṣiṇa) is a king of the Kambojas featured in the Hindu epic Mahabharata.

== Legend ==
On the 14th day of the Kurukshetra War, Arjuna, with his charioteer Krishna, attempts to reach Jayadratha. Drona and Duryodhana arrange warriors in Arjuna's path, trying to impede his progress until sunset. Sudakshina rallies a fleeing Kaurava akshauhini, challenging Arjuna. He throws a spear at Arjuna; the spear connects and Arjuna swoons in his seat, dripping blood. The Kaurava army begins to cheer, thinking that Arjuna is dead. However, Arjuna quickly recovers and angrily invokes the Indrastra, which multiplies into many arrows and decimates the Kaurava forces. Sudakshina falls to one of these arrows.

== See also ==
- Srindra Varmana
- Chandravarma
- Kamatha
