= Cambodian =

Cambodian usually refers to:

- Something of, from, or related to the country of Cambodia
  - Cambodian people (or Khmer people)
  - Cambodian language (or Khmer language)
  - For citizens and nationals of Cambodia, see Demographics of Cambodia
  - For languages spoken in Cambodia, see Languages of Cambodia

Cambodian may also refer to:

== Other ==
- Cambodian architecture
- Cambodian cinema
- Cambodian culture
- Cambodian cuisine
- Cambodian French
- Cambodian literature
- Cambodian music
- Cambodian name
- Cambodian nationalism
- Cambodian descendants worldwide:
  - Cambodian Americans
  - Cambodian Australians
  - Cambodian Canadians
  - Cambodians in France

== See also ==
- List of Cambodians
- Kampuchea (disambiguation)
