= John Orloff =

American screenwriter, television creator, and producer

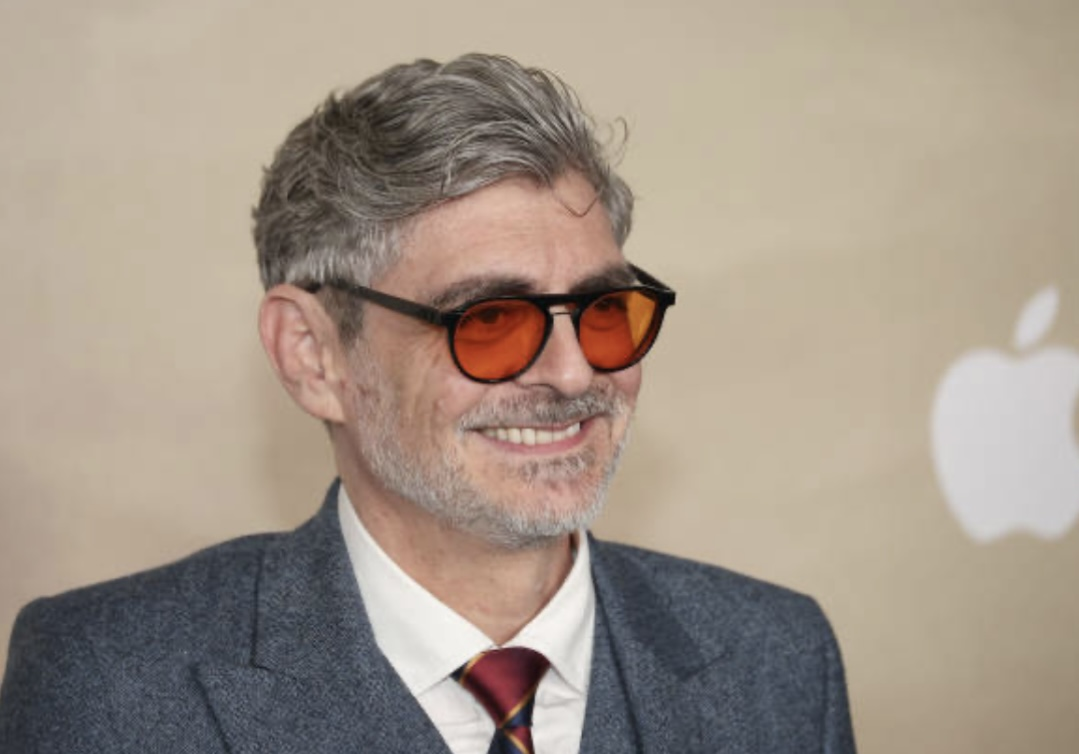
- Born: Los Angeles, California, U.S.
- Education: University of California, Los Angeles
- Occupation: Screenwriter
- Writing career
- Notable works: Band of Brothers; Masters of the Air; A Mighty Heart

John Orloff is an American screenwriter, television creator, and producer.

== Early life ==
Orloff was born in Los Angeles, California, where he was raised in a "Hollywood" family. His father, also named John Orloff, was a TV commercial director. His grandmother was B-movie actress Peggy Knudsen, and his great-grandparents were the real-life married couple of the Fibber McGee and Molly program, Jim and Marian Jordan, stars of radio and television.

Orloff studied screenwriting at the University of California, Los Angeles Film School, and on graduation went to work in the advertising business.

== Career ==
After ten years working on TV commercials in various positions, he met a TV movie development executive, now his wife, from the HBO television network. When she continually brought home what he felt were "awful" screenplays, he decided to write his own, a 16th-century English melodrama based on the Shakespeare authorship question, which ended up being sent to Tom Hanks and Steven Spielberg.

They were not interested in producing his project, but Hanks asked Orloff, a keen "World War II buff", to write for the 2001 HBO miniseries Band of Brothers. Orloff wrote episode 2, "Day of Days" and episode 9, "Why We Fight". His work earned him a Christopher Award, and an Emmy nomination for Outstanding Writing for a Miniseries, Movie or a Dramatic Special. It is the single highest grossing and best-selling TV DVD of all time, and one of the highest grossing DVDs of any kind.

Orloff adapted Mariane Pearl's memoir A Mighty Heart, for a film producer Brad Pitt. New York Times film reviewer Manohla Dargis declared the finished film "a surprising, insistently political work of commercial art". Orloff's script for the film earned him an Independent Spirit Award nomination for Best First Screenplay. In a 2011 interview with 60 Minutes' Bob Simon, the film's star, Angelina Jolie, mentioned that A Mighty Heart is her favorite film starring herself.

Changing genres, Orloff next adapted the children's fantasy book series Legend of the Guardians, based on the Guardians of Ga'Hoole series of books written by Kathryn Lasky. The animated 3-D film was directed by Zack Snyder, and was released in 2010.

Orloff's script based on the Shakespeare authorship question was made into a film, Anonymous, released in 2011, and starring Rhys Ifans and Vanessa Redgrave to a controversial reception.

Orloff created, wrote, and co-executive produced AppleTV+'s Masters of the Air, considered to be the third in Steven Spielberg and Tom Hanks' Band of Brothers trilogy. It premiered on January 26, 2024, and was the most watched AppleTV+ premiere in the streamer's history.

In August 2026, it was announce Orloff is co-creating, executive producing, and writing a Warhammer 40,000 "animated event" series executive produced by Henry Cavill and co-created an directed by Dave Wilson.

== Writing credits ==
Miniseries

Year	Title	Writer	Co-Executive Producer	Creator	Notes
2001	Band of Brothers	Yes	No	No	2 episodes
2024	Masters of the Air	Yes	Yes	Yes	9 episodes

Feature film

Year	Title	Notes
2007	A Mighty Heart	
2008	10,000 BC	Uncredited rewrite
2010	Legend of the Guardians: The Owls of Ga'Hoole	
2011	Anonymous	Also executive producer
2019	The Last Vermeer	Credited as "James McGee"
