= Adam Schiff =

American politician (born 1960)

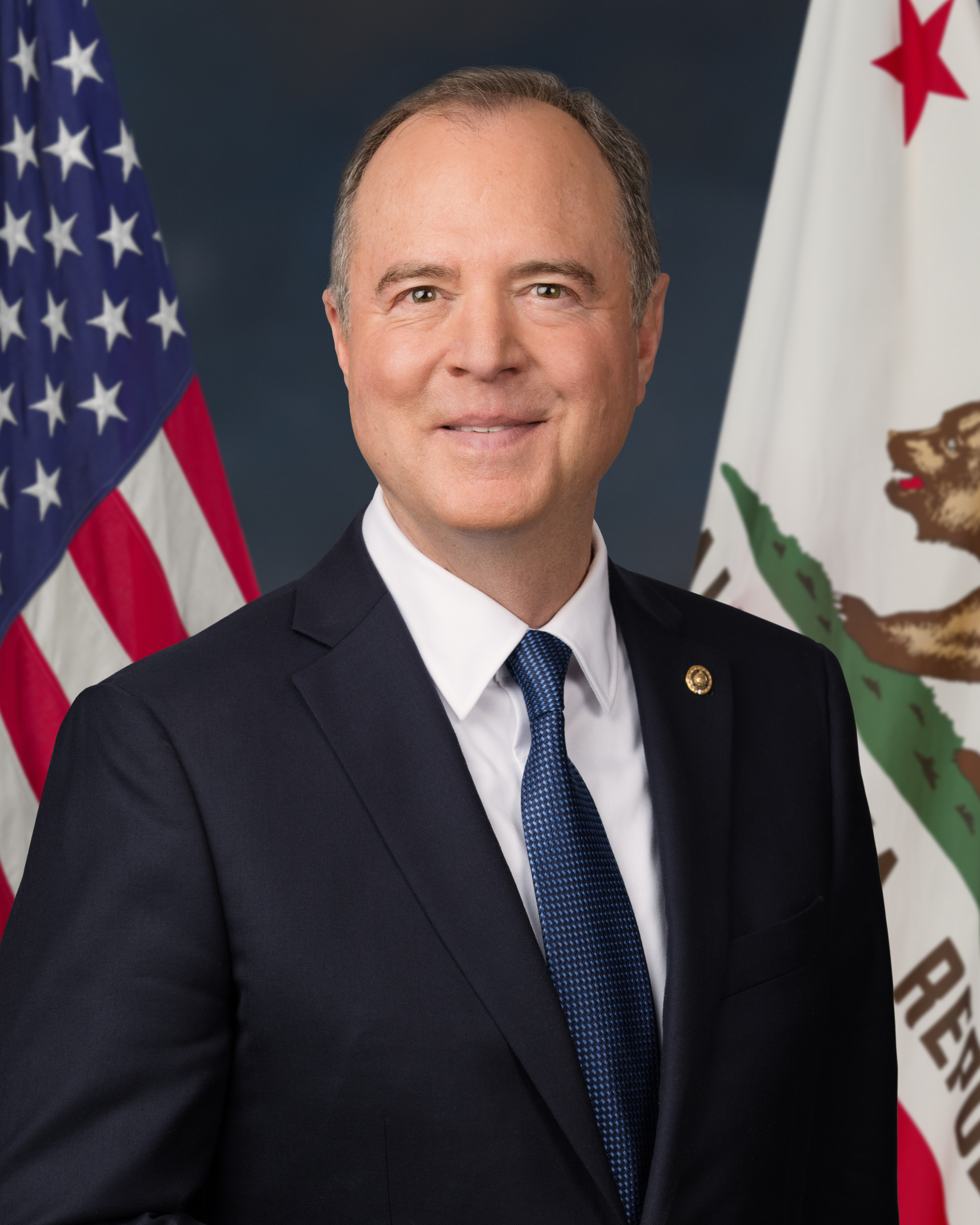
- Official portrait, 2024

United States Senator from California
- Incumbent
- Assumed office December 9, 2024 Serving with Alex Padilla
- Preceded by: Laphonza Butler

Chair of the House Intelligence Committee
- In office January 3, 2019 – January 3, 2023
- Preceded by: Devin Nunes
- Succeeded by: Mike Turner

Ranking Member of the House Intelligence Committee
- In office January 3, 2015 – January 3, 2019
- Preceded by: Dutch Ruppersberger
- Succeeded by: Devin Nunes

Member of the U.S. House of Representatives from California
- In office January 3, 2001 – December 8, 2024
- Preceded by: James E. Rogan
- Succeeded by: Laura Friedman
- Constituency: 27th district (2001–2003); 29th district (2003–2013); 28th district (2013–2023); 30th district (2023–2024)

Member of the California Senate from the 21st district
- In office December 2, 1996 – November 30, 2000
- Preceded by: Newton Russell
- Succeeded by: Jack Scott

Personal details
- Born: Adam Bennett Schiff; June 22, 1960 (age 66) Framingham, Massachusetts, U.S.
- Party: Democratic
- Spouse: Eve Sanderson (m. 1995)
- Children: 2
- Education: Stanford University (BA); Harvard University (JD)
- Website: Senate website Campaign website
- Schiff's voice Schiff paying tribute to one of his retiring staffers. Recorded September 29, 2021

Adam Bennett Schiff (/ˈʃɪf/ SHIFF; born June 22, 1960) is an American lawyer and politician serving as the junior United States senator from California, a seat he has held since 2024. A member of the Democratic Party, Schiff served in the United States House of Representatives from 2001 to 2024 and in the California State Senate from 1996 to 2000. Before being elected to public office, Schiff was a judicial law clerk, an assistant United States attorney from 1987 to 1993, and an unsuccessful candidate for California State Assembly in 1994.

In the House, Schiff sat on the Intelligence Committee beginning in 2008; he became the ranking member in 2015 and chaired it from 2019 until Republicans retook control of the House in 2023. He previously served on the House Foreign Affairs Committee. Schiff was the lead impeachment manager in the first impeachment trial of President Donald Trump. He had previously served as the joint lead impeachment manager in two other judicial impeachment trials. Schiff was elected to the Senate in 2024, succeeding Laphonza Butler. He defeated fellow Democratic U.S. representatives Katie Porter and Barbara Lee in the primary and Republican Steve Garvey in the general election.

== Early life and education ==
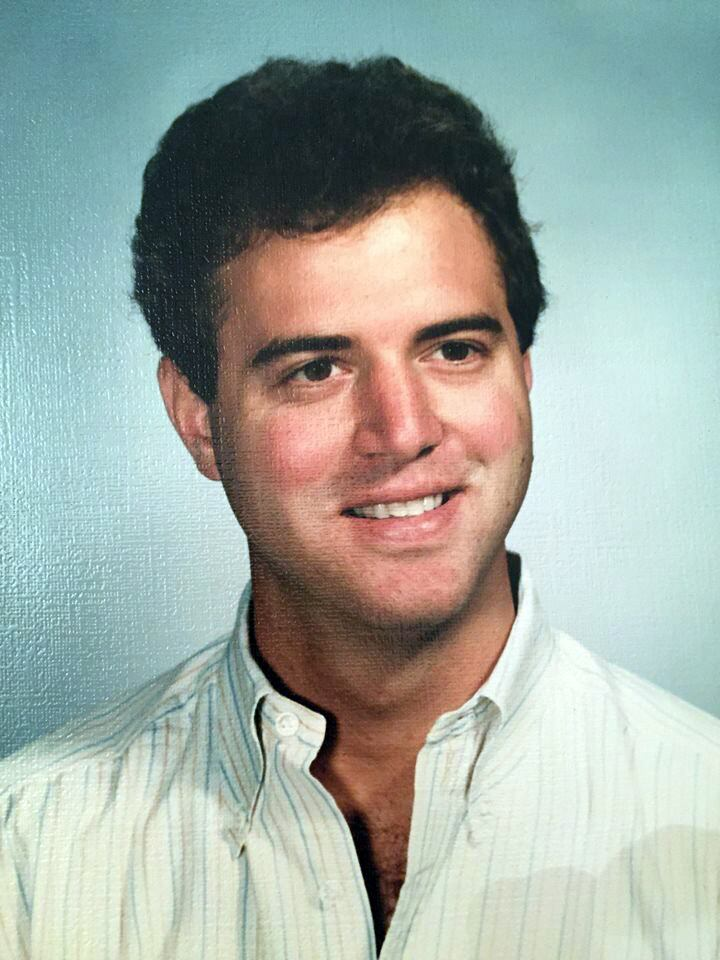
Schiff in the Harvard Law School yearbook, 1985

Schiff was born on June 22, 1960, in Framingham, Massachusetts, the son of Edward and Sherrill Ann (née Glovsky) Schiff. He is the great-grandson of Lithuanian Jews who left Eastern Europe. Schiff moved with his parents to Scottsdale, Arizona, in 1970 and Alamo, California, in 1972. In 1978, he graduated from Monte Vista High School in Danville, California, where he played soccer and was both the class salutatorian and the student his peers voted "most likely to succeed".

Schiff received a Bachelor of Arts degree in political science from Stanford University in 1982 and graduated with distinction. He obtained his Juris Doctor from Harvard Law School cum laude in 1985. Schiff was a member of the Harvard Law School Forum; his tasks included driving guest speakers (including William J. Brennan Jr.) from the airport to campus and back. He also worked as a student research assistant for Professor Laurence Tribe.

== Law career ==
After law school, Schiff spent a year as a judicial law clerk for Judge William Matthew Byrne Jr. of the United States District Court for the Central District of California. From 1987 to 1993, he was an assistant United States attorney in the Office of the United States Attorney for the Central District of California. In that position, Schiff came to public attention when he prosecuted the case against Richard Miller, a former FBI agent who spied for the Soviet Union. The first trial resulted in a hung jury; the second trial resulted in a conviction that was overturned on appeal. Miller was convicted in a third trial.

In May 1994, Schiff was a candidate for the 43rd district seat in the California State Assembly in a special election and lost to Republican nominee James E. Rogan. That November, he was the unsuccessful Democratic nominee for a full term, again losing to Rogan.

== California State Senate (1996–2000) ==
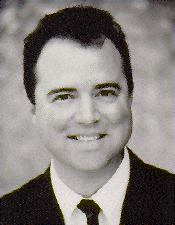
Schiff as a state senator in 1997

In 1996, Schiff was elected to represent the 21st district in the California State Senate, defeating Republican assemblywoman Paula Boland, who had moved into the district to run. When his term began, he was the Senate's youngest member, at 36. During his four-year term, Schiff chaired the Senate Judiciary Committee and Select Committee on Juvenile Justice, and the state legislature's Joint Committee on the Arts.

As a state senator, Schiff authored dozens of measures that were enacted into law. These included Senate Bill 1847, Chapter 1021. Passed in 1998, this legislation continued work on the stalled Blue Line light rail extension to Pasadena by renaming the Blue Line the Gold Line and creating the Foothill Gold Line Construction Authority, which separated the project from the Los Angeles County Metropolitan Transportation Authority. The construction authority finished the Pasadena line in 2003 and extended it to Azusa in 2016. A third leg was begun, which is intended to extend the line to Pomona by 2025. Schiff's work on the project earned him the nickname "Father of the Gold Line".

During his tenure, Schiff also authored "tough on crime" measures, which did not pass or were vetoed by governors, including a bill to allow minors 14 or older accused of serious crimes to be tried as adults and a bill that would have made it a felony to hire an undocumented immigrant. According to The Guardian, these proposals were in line with the "tough on crime" attitude of other politicians in the late 1990s.

== U.S. House of Representatives (2001–2024) ==
=== Elections ===
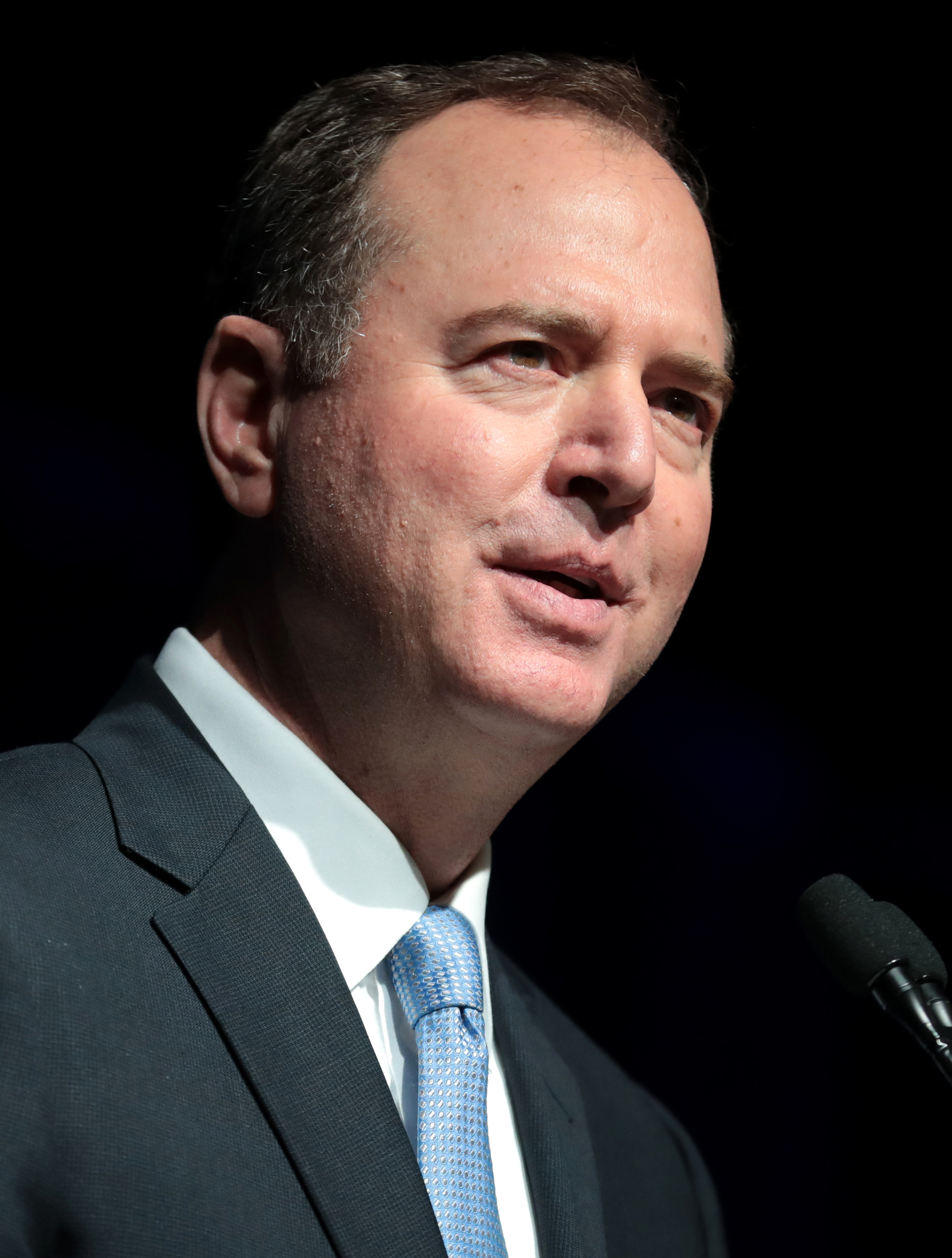
Schiff speaking to the California Democratic Party in June 2019

In 2000, Schiff challenged James E. Rogan, the incumbent, in what was then California's 27th congressional district. The district had once been a Republican stronghold but had been trending Democratic since the early 1990s. In what was the most expensive House race ever at the time, Schiff unseated Rogan, taking 53% of the vote to Rogan's 44%. He became only the second Democrat to represent this district since its creation in 1913.

After the 2000 census, the district was renumbered the 29th and made significantly more Democratic. As a result, Schiff never faced another contest nearly as close as his 2000 bid, and was reelected 11 times. His district became even more Democratic after the 2010 census, when it was renumbered the 28th and pushed into Los Angeles proper. Even before that, none of his Republican challengers had cleared 35% of the vote.

In 2010, Schiff defeated Tea Party–backed Republican John Colbert for a sixth term. In 2012, he defeated Republican Phil Jennerjahn. In 2014, he defeated independent candidate Steve Stokes. In 2016, he defeated Republican candidate Lenore Solis.

In 2018, Schiff initially competed in the primary with Democratic challenger Kim Gruenenfelder. After Gruenenfelder dropped out of the race, Schiff defeated Republican nominee Johnny Nalbandian.

In 2020, Schiff faced a crowded primary, which included Republican attorney Eric Early and Democratic drag queen Maebe A. Girl. He won the primary with a majority of the vote, with Girl and Early in a close race for second. On March 27, Early was finally determined to have advanced to the general election. Schiff easily won the general election.

After the 2020 census, Schiff's district was renumbered the 30th and made more Democratic. In January 2022, Schiff announced he would run for reelection in the new 30th district. He defeated Girl with 71% of the vote.

In lieu of running for a 13th term, Schiff ran to succeed Dianne Feinstein in the United States Senate in 2024, and won. In preparation for an appointment to finish the remainder of Feinstein's term, he resigned from the House on December 8, 2024.

=== Tenure ===
==== 2003 invasion of Iraq ====
Schiff voted in favor of the 2003 invasion of Iraq. In February 2015, discussing how or whether to tailor Bush-era plans from 2001 and 2002 to fight ISIS, he was asked whether he regretted that vote. He said: "Absolutely. Unfortunately, our intelligence was dead wrong on that, on Saddam at that time. The vote set in motion a cascading series of events which have [had] disastrous consequences."

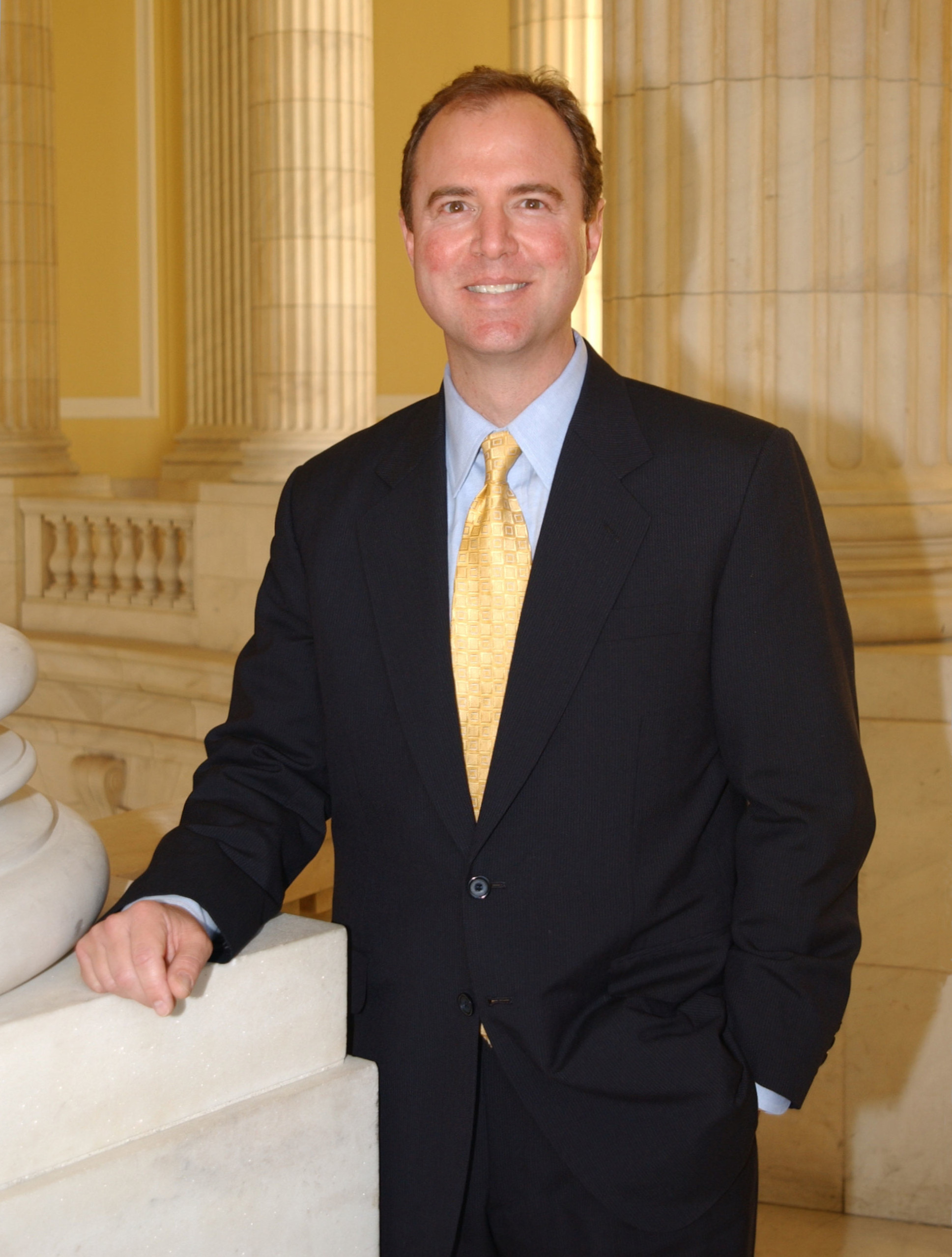
Schiff at the United States Capitol during the 115th Congress

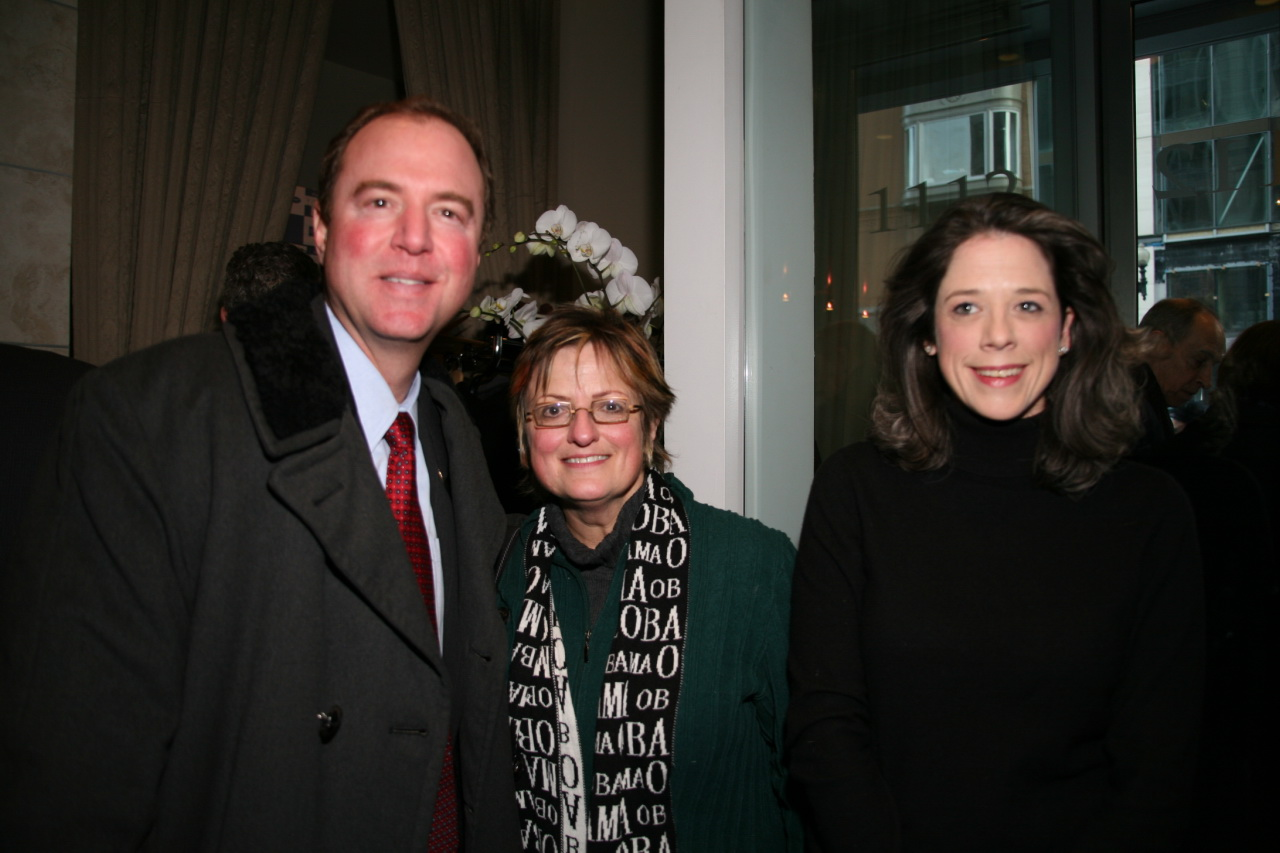
Schiff and Heather Podesta at a party hosted by the Podesta Group in Washington, D.C., honoring the inauguration of Barack Obama

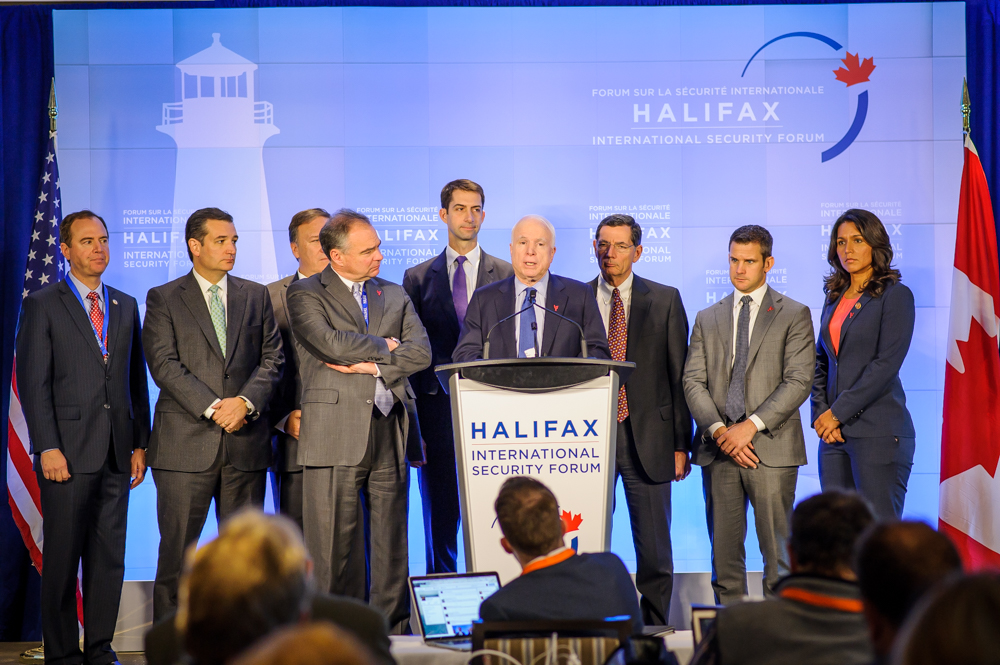
US congressional delegation at Halifax International Security Forum 2014

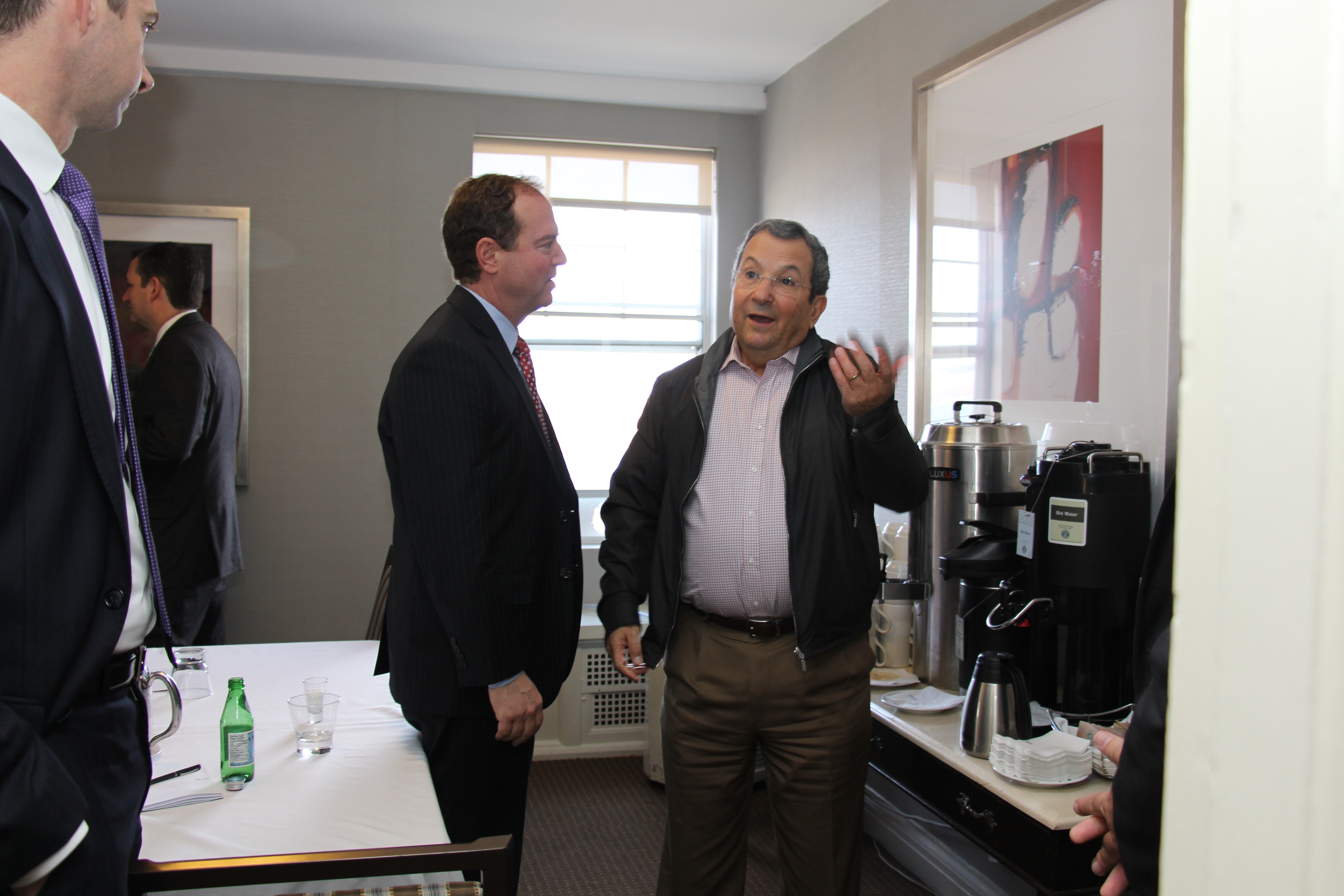
Schiff with former Israeli Prime Minister Ehud Barak in November 2014

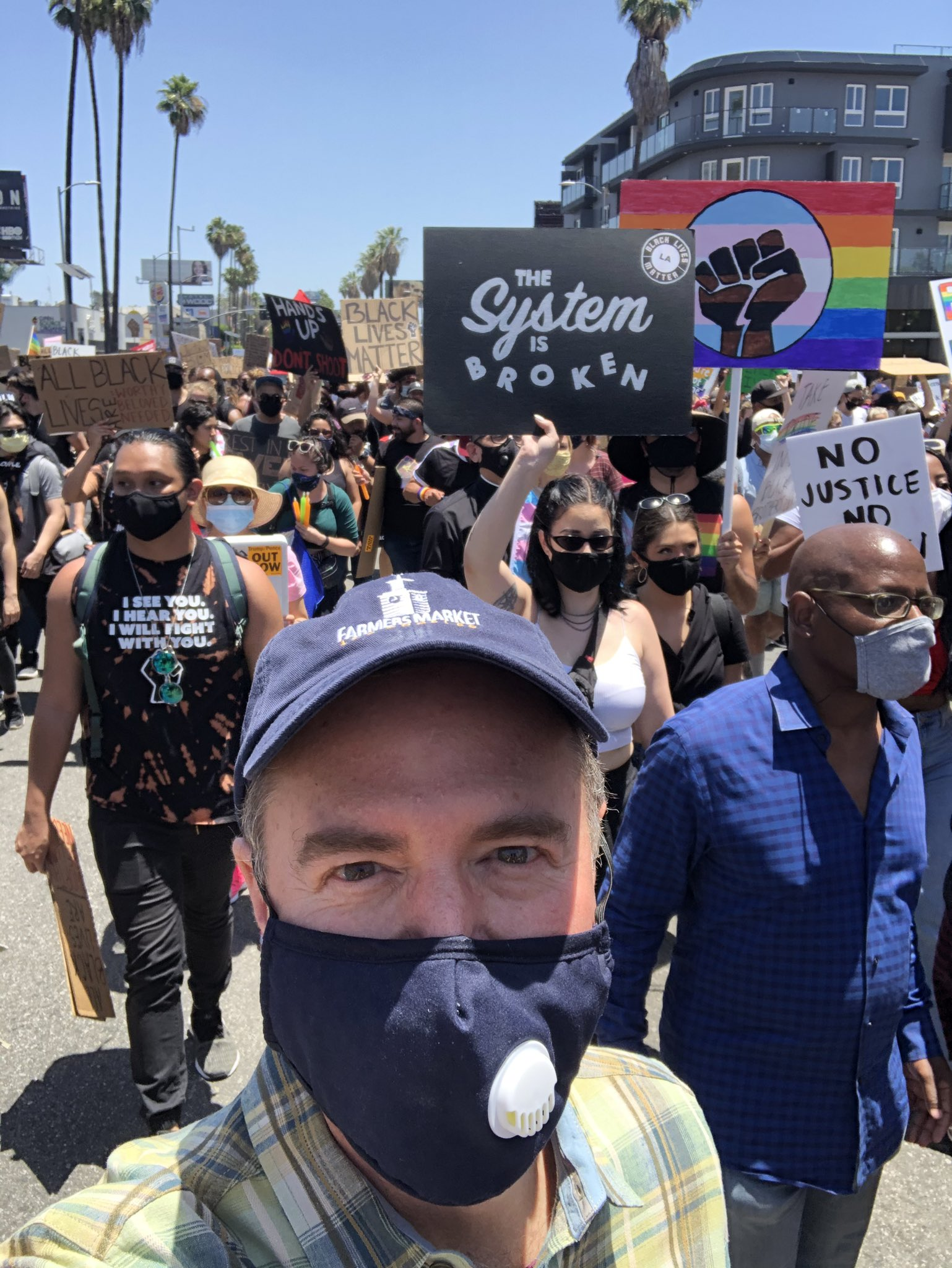
Schiff at George Floyd protest in Los Angeles

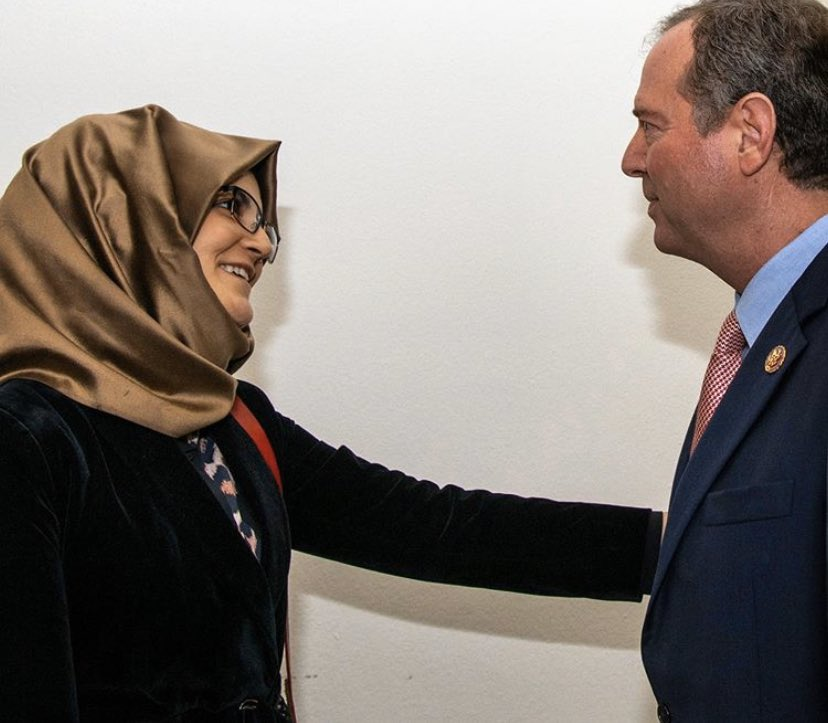
Schiff and Hatice Cengiz, the fiancée of the murdered journalist Jamal Khashoggi

==== Armenian genocide resolution ====
Schiff has been a leading voice in Armenian-American issues; he claims that over 70,000 Armenian-Americans reside in his district. He introduced U.S. House Resolution 106, recognizing the Armenian genocide, which the House Foreign Affairs Committee approved on October 11, 2007, but which began to lose support after Turkey's prime minister said that approval of the resolution would endanger U.S.–Turkey relations. On March 4, 2010, the House Foreign Affairs Committee again approved the resolution by a 23–22 margin. Immediately, the Turkish government recalled its U.S. ambassador. Schiff said in 2007, "When you think about what we have against us – the president, a foreign policy establishment that has condoned this campaign of denial, the Turkish lobby – against that you have the truth, which is a powerful thing but doesn't always win out". On October 29, 2019, the full House of Representatives passed the resolution by a vote of 405–11. Schiff has an "A+" rating and is endorsed by the Armenian National Committee of America.

==== Helicopter noise ====
Beginning with Representative Howard Berman before Berman was voted out, Schiff worked on the Helicopter Noise Relief Act, a measure to reduce unwanted helicopter noise across Los Angeles County by authorizing the Federal Aviation Administration (FAA) to study and regulate it. After reintroducing his legislation, Schiff worked with Senator Dianne Feinstein to push the FAA to act, and together they attached a provision in the 2014 omnibus appropriations package directing the U.S. secretary of transportation and the FAA to address helicopter noise in Los Angeles County. As a result, in 2015 the FAA created a countywide helicopter noise public complaint system, the first step toward regulation.

==== Intelligence and surveillance reform ====
Schiff has been a prominent supporter of surveillance reform, especially in the wake of Edward Snowden's leaks of classified intelligence. In 2007, in response to disclosure of the Terrorist Surveillance Program, Schiff and Representative Jeff Flake offered a successful amendment to clarify that the Foreign Intelligence Surveillance Act is the exclusive means for collecting foreign intelligence information within the U.S. Schiff criticized the National Security Agency's bulk collection of telephone metadata. In 2014, he introduced the Telephone Metadata Reform Act, which would prohibit the bulk collection of domestic phone records. Schiff also introduced several bills aimed at reforming the Foreign Intelligence Surveillance Court, including a bill to require outside counsel to be appointed to argue for privacy and civil liberties protections in certain cases before the Court.

==== Investigation of Benghazi attack ====
Nancy Pelosi appointed Schiff to the House Select Committee on Benghazi in 2014 as one of the five Democrats on the committee. He had participated in the House Permanent Select Committee on Intelligence investigation into the attacks on the Benghazi diplomatic compound, which found that the initial talking points the intelligence community provided were flawed but not intended to deceive, and that diplomatic facilities across the world lacked adequate security. The report's findings were unanimous and bipartisan. Before he was appointed to the Benghazi Select Committee, Schiff called the establishment of a select committee to investigate the 2012 attack a "colossal waste of time" and said Democratic leaders should not appoint any members: "I think it's just a tremendous red herring and a waste of taxpayer resources". Despite those reservations, he accepted an appointment to the Committee because if he felt he "could add value, [he] would serve".

==== Press freedom ====
In 2006, Schiff formed the bipartisan, bicameral Congressional Caucus for the Freedom of the Press, aimed at advancing press freedom around the world. The Caucus proposed the Daniel Pearl Freedom of the Press Act, originally introduced to Congress by Schiff, Representative Mike Pence, and Senator Christopher Dodd on October 1, 2009, in response to the murder of Daniel Pearl by terrorists in Pakistan. The legislation requires the United States Department of State to expand its scrutiny of news media intimidation and freedom of the press restrictions during its annual report on human rights in each country. The act passed the House by a vote of 403 to 12 and unanimously in the Senate, but the Senate removed a provision requiring the secretary of state (in coordination with the Department of State's Bureau of Democracy, Human Rights and Labor, and in consultation with the Undersecretary for Public Affairs and Public Diplomacy) to establish a grant program aiming to promote freedom of the press worldwide. On May 17, 2010, President Barack Obama, accompanied by the Pearl family, signed the act into law.

==== Saudi Arabian–led intervention in Yemen ====
In 2015, Schiff supported the Saudi Arabian–led intervention in Yemen, saying: "The military action by Saudi Arabia and its partners was necessitated by the illegal action of the Houthi rebels and their Iranian backers. ... But ultimately, a negotiated end to this crisis is the only way to restore order in Yemen and shrink the space for terrorism".

In April 2019, Schiff voted for a bipartisan resolution under the War Powers Act to end U.S. involvement in the war. It passed the Senate, but after passing the House it was vetoed.

==== War authorization reform and authorization against ISIS ====
After Obama's speech at the National Defense University examining the U.S. war powers during the war on terror, Schiff introduced bipartisan legislation to repeal the 2001 Authorization for Use of Military Force Against Terrorists because he felt that "the current AUMF is outdated and straining at the edges to justify the use of force outside the war theater". The bill, introduced with Representative Tom Rooney, was intended to sunset. Schiff has also been a forceful proponent of debating and voting on a new war authorization against the Islamic State of Iraq and the Levant.

Schiff has been a supporter of national defense spending, voting for every increase in the defense budget during his career.

==== Comments on Trump–Russia collusion investigation ====
In a March 22, 2017, interview with Chuck Todd, Schiff said there was "more than circumstantial evidence now" that Donald Trump's 2016 presidential campaign colluded with Russia. Todd asked whether he had seen direct evidence of collusion and Schiff responded that there was "evidence that is not circumstantial and is very much worthy of investigation".

On April 2, 2017, Schiff, the ranking member on the House Select Intelligence Committee, which is tasked with conducting inquiries related to Russian interference in the 2016 United States elections, appeared on CNN's State of the Union. In a wide-ranging interview, Schiff and host Jake Tapper discussed Michael Flynn's request for immunity, Schiff's and Devin Nunes's separate inspections of White House documents, Trump's allegations of wiretapping in Trump Tower, and Nunes's apparent close association with the Trump White House. Tapper asked Schiff whether there was evidence that Trump colluded with Russia. Schiff replied: "I don't think we can say anything definitively at this point. We are still at the very early stage of the investigation. The only thing I can say is that it would be irresponsible for us not to get to the bottom of this". Tapper asked, "Do you think that Chairman Nunes was part of an attempt to provide some sort of cover for the president's claim about Obama wiretapping him at Trump Tower, which, obviously, this does not prove, but to cover for that, or an attempt to distract, as you're suggesting?" Schiff replied, "It certainly is an attempt to distract and to hide the origin of the materials, to hide the White House hand. The question is, of course, why? And I think the answer to the question is this effort to point the Congress in other directions, basically say, don't look at me, don't look at Russia, there is nothing to see here". A few days later, Nunes recused himself as leader of the investigative panel while the House Committee on Ethics investigated whether he had disclosed classified information.

On July 23, 2017, on Meet the Press, Schiff said: "at the end of the day we need to make sure that our president is operating not in his personal best interests and not because he's worried about what the Russians might have but because what he is doing is in America's best interest. The fact that we have questions about this is in itself harmful". The next morning on Twitter, Trump called Schiff "Sleazy Adam Schiff, the totally biased Congressman looking into 'Russia'" and called the Russian collusion investigation "the Dem loss excuse". Schiff responded on Twitter that the president's "comments and actions are beneath the dignity of the office".

In December 2018, Schiff suggested that Trump associate Roger Stone might have lied to Congress, and said the transcript of his testimony should be forwarded to the Special Counsel. In November 2019, Stone was convicted of lying to Congress.

When he became chair of the House Intelligence Committee in 2019, Schiff embarked on a personal mission to investigate Trump's connections to Russia, separate from the Special Counsel investigation. He came under fire when he demurred when asked if he would accept it if the Special Counsel's investigation concluded that Trump had not colluded with Russia, saying that he had great confidence in Mueller but that "there may be, for example, evidence of collusion or conspiracy that is clear and convincing, but not proof beyond a reasonable doubt", as is needed for a criminal conviction.

On March 28, 2019, the nine Republican members of the House Intelligence Committee officially called for Schiff to resign due to his allegations that Trump's campaign colluded with Russians in the 2016 election. Schiff responded by accusing the Republican members of tolerating "immoral" and "corrupt" conduct by Trump campaign members and administration appointees.

===== Censure =====
On June 21, 2023, the House of Representatives censured Schiff in a party-line vote on H.Res. 521, which investigated his role as Chairman of the Intelligence Committee in promoting the "conspiracy theory" that Trump colluded with Russia in the 2016 United States presidential election. The resolution alleged that Schiff misled the American public with "falsehoods, misrepresentations and abuses of sensitive information" about the election and as part of the first impeachment of Donald Trump. Schiff has denied the allegations, calling them "defamatory".

==== North Korea ====
Schiff called North Korea "one of the most brutal and despotic regimes in the world". After the death of American student Otto Warmbier, who was imprisoned during a visit to North Korea, Schiff said, "The barbaric treatment of Otto Warmbier by the North Korean regime amounts to the murder of a U.S. citizen".

In April 2018, when asked whether he thought Trump deserved at least partial credit for North Korea's involvement in talks with the U.S., Schiff replied: "I think it's more than fair to say that the combination of the president's unpredictability and indeed his bellicosity had something to do with the North Koreans deciding to come to the negotiating table".

==== Israel and antisemitism ====
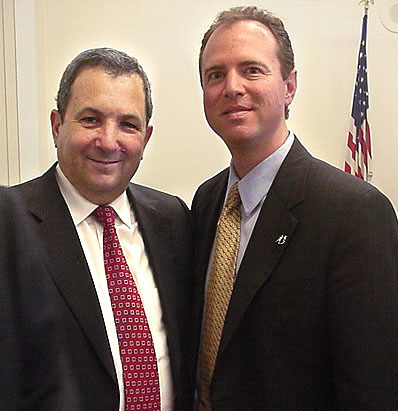
Schiff with former Israeli Prime Minister Ehud Barak in 2002

Schiff is a supporter of Israel. In December 2016, he urged Obama to veto UN Security Council Resolution 2334, which condemned Israeli settlement building in the occupied Palestinian territories as a violation of international law.

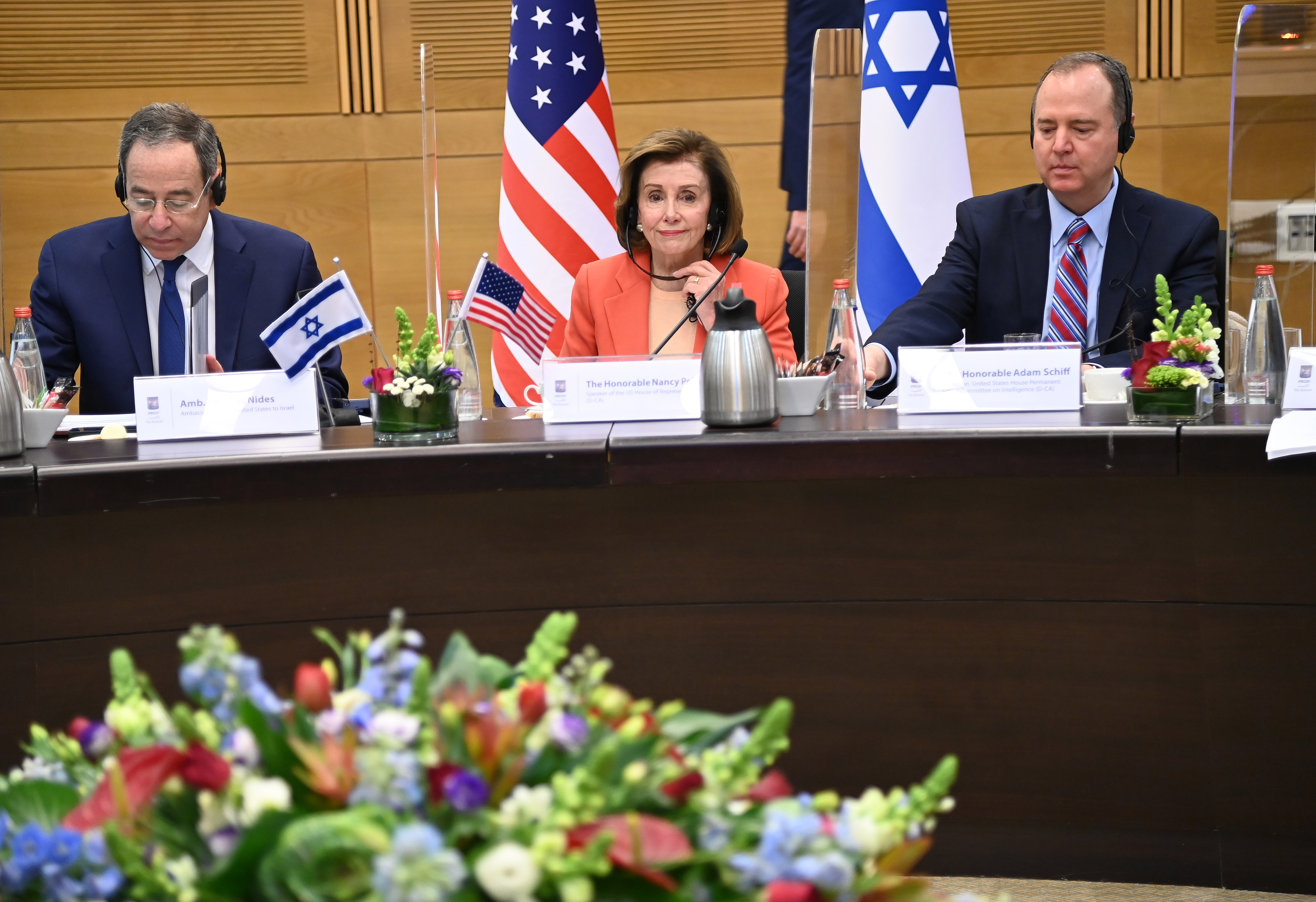
Schiff and Nancy Pelosi in the Knesset, Jerusalem, February 2022

In February 2019, Representative Ilhan Omar tweeted, "It's all about the Benjamins baby" in reference to American politicians' support for Israel and invoked the pro-Israel lobby American Israel Public Affairs Committee (AIPAC). The tweet received widespread bipartisan condemnation, including from Schiff, for implying that lobby money was fueling American politicians' support of Israel. Schiff said it was "never acceptable to give voice to, or repeat, anti-Semitic smears".

In October 2023, Schiff condemned Hamas's actions during the Gaza war and expressed his support for Israel and its right to self-defense. He rejected calls for a ceasefire but said he supported "humanitarian pauses" to deliver aid to Palestinians in the Gaza Strip.

The AIPAC-affiliated Super PAC, United Democracy Project, gave $5 million to the pro-Schiff Super PAC Standing Strong during Schiff's 2024 Senate primary campaign, as confirmed by its spokesman, Patrick Dorton. Democratic Majority for Israel's political arm, DMFI PAC, also endorsed Schiff during this campaign.

==== Murder of Jamal Khashoggi ====
After news reports that the CIA concluded that Saudi crown prince Mohammed bin Salman had ordered the assassination of Saudi journalist Jamal Khashoggi, Trump said there was insufficient CIA evidence to link bin Salman to the murder. As the top Democrat on the House Intelligence Committee, Schiff was briefed by the CIA on the agency assessment, and said afterward that Trump was being dishonest about the CIA findings.

==== Impeachments ====
In 2009, Schiff was appointed and served as an impeachment manager (prosecutor) in the impeachment trial of Judge Samuel B. Kent. He was the lead manager alongside Bob Goodlatte. The next year, Schiff was appointed and served as an impeachment manager in the impeachment trial of Judge Thomas Porteous. He was again the lead manager alongside Goodlatte.

As chair of the Intelligence Committee, Schiff was one of the lead investigators in the impeachment inquiry against Trump stemming from the Trump–Ukraine scandal. Trump was impeached along party lines by 228 votes to 193 in the House on December 18, 2019, making him the third president to be impeached.

On January 15, 2020, House speaker Nancy Pelosi named Schiff a lead impeachment manager. In this role, he led a team of seven House members responsible for presenting the impeachment case against Trump during his Senate trial.

==== Armenia–Azerbaijan War ====
Schiff accused Turkey of inciting the conflict between Armenia and Azerbaijan over the disputed region of Nagorno-Karabakh. He said the 2020 Nagorno-Karabakh war "must cause us [to] reexamine our relationship with both Turkey and Azerbaijan. If an ally of the United States is recruiting fighters from Syria to encourage further bloodshed and murder of civilians, what kind of ally are they in NATO or otherwise?". Schiff co-signed a letter to Secretary of State Mike Pompeo stating: "We write to express our deep concern with Azerbaijan's renewed aggression against Artsakh (Nagorno Karabakh) and the rising possibility of a wider conflict with Armenia. We ask that the Administration use all available diplomatic tools to reduce tensions, end the fighting, and restrain Azerbaijan from further offensive actions." Schiff called for U.S. recognition of the Republic of Artsakh, which was an autonomous oblast within the Azerbaijan Soviet Socialist Republic but has been under control of ethnic Armenian forces backed by Armenia since the end of a separatist war in 1994. He reiterated that call in April 2023.

==== Investigation into the January 6 attack on the Capitol ====
On July 1, 2021, Pelosi appointed nine members (seven Democrats and two Republicans) to the Select Committee to Investigate the January 6 Attack on the United States Capitol, which included Schiff.

On June 21, 2022, Schiff led Day 4 of the committee's public hearings, which included testimony from three Republican officials to whom Trump reached out after the election: Georgia secretary of state Brad Raffensperger, his deputy Gabe Sterling, and Arizona House of Representatives speaker Rusty Bowers. The second half of the hearing focused on Trump supporters' harassment of and threats to Georgia poll worker Wandrea' ArShaye Moss and her family, which led her to quit her job and go into hiding.

Schiff was interviewed after the hearing by reporters and called the testimony "enormously powerful". He added, "The lie lives on, and with it so does the danger."

==== Ban on stock trading ====
Schiff supports a ban on stock trading by members of Congress.

=== Committee assignments ===
For the 118th Congress:

- Committee on the Judiciary
  - Subcommittee on Courts, Intellectual Property, and the Internet

=== Caucus memberships ===
- Co-chair of the Congressional International Anti-Piracy Caucus
- Co-founded the Democratic Study Group on National Security
- Co-founded the Congressional Caucus for Freedom of the Press
- Black Maternal Health Caucus
- New Democrat Coalition
- House Baltic Caucus
- Congressional Arts Caucus
- Afterschool Caucuses
- Congressional Asian Pacific American Caucus
- Congressional Caucus for the Equal Rights Amendment
- Congressional Taiwan Caucus
- Congressional Ukraine Caucus
- United States–China Working Group

== Campaign for appointment to be California's attorney general ==
In early December 2020, President-elect Joe Biden announced he would nominate Attorney General of California Xavier Becerra for Secretary of Health and Human Services. Axios reported in February 2021 that Schiff was lobbying Governor Gavin Newsom and his allies to appoint him as Attorney General, with a reported endorsement from Speaker Nancy Pelosi.

In response to Schiff's lobbying for the attorney general's post, 36 criminal and social justice groups, notably the Black Lives Matter Los Angeles and Long Beach chapters, wrote an open letter to Newsom expressing "strong opposition", citing his past support for "tough on crime" measures, though they also specified that their letter was not an endorsement of any other candidate. On March 24, 2021, Newsom announced he would appoint California state assemblyman Rob Bonta, who took office on April 23.

== U.S. Senate (2024–present) ==
=== Elections ===
==== 2024 ====
Senate campaign logo

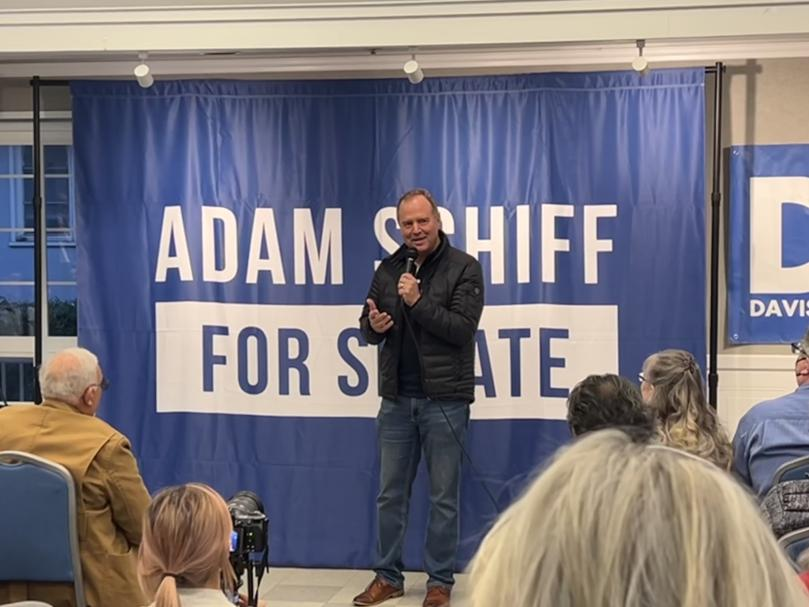
Adam Schiff at his first Senate campaign event in Davis, February 2023

On January 26, 2023, Schiff declared his candidacy for the United States Senate in the 2024 election. On February 2, his candidacy received a significant boost with an endorsement from former house speaker Nancy Pelosi. This endorsement came after the incumbent, Dianne Feinstein, announced she would not seek reelection.

In the ensuing primary, Schiff faced Representatives Katie Porter and Barbara Lee. During the primary, he spent $10 million elevating his Republican opponent Steve Garvey in order to squeeze Porter and Lee out of second place, as Californian primary process advances the two most preferred candidates, regardless of party, to the general election.

On March 5, 2024, Schiff advanced to the general election, where he faced Garvey, a former professional baseball player. Schiff was widely expected to win the race.

On July 17, in an exclusive interview with the Los Angeles Times, Schiff publicly called for President Joe Biden to end his bid for reelection, becoming one of the most prominent Democrats in Congress to do so.

On November 5, Schiff won both the election to complete Feinstein's remaining term and the election for the Senate term beginning on January 3, 2025.

=== Tenure ===
Schiff was sworn in on December 9, 2024, as a junior U.S. senator in the 118th United States Congress.

==== Food and agriculture ====
A member of the Senate Agriculture Committee, Schiff led a July 2025 letter signed by 32 Democratic senators urging committee leadership to exclude any provisions in the upcoming farm bill that would overturn the California farm animal welfare law Proposition 12, which restricts the sale of products from animals raised in intensive battery cages, gestation crates, and veal crates.

In December 2025, Schiff authored legislation to direct the USDA to develop a national strategy for protein diversification and authorize $500 million to support the development of alternative proteins including plant-based and cultivated meat.

==== Foreign policy ====
Schiff supported the 2025 Israeli strikes on Iran, claiming that Israel could "not afford" to let Iran develop a nuclear weapon.

==== Committee assignments ====
- Committee on Agriculture, Nutrition, and Forestry
- Committee on Environment and Public Works
- Committee on Small Business and Entrepreneurship
- Committee on the Judiciary

== Personal life ==
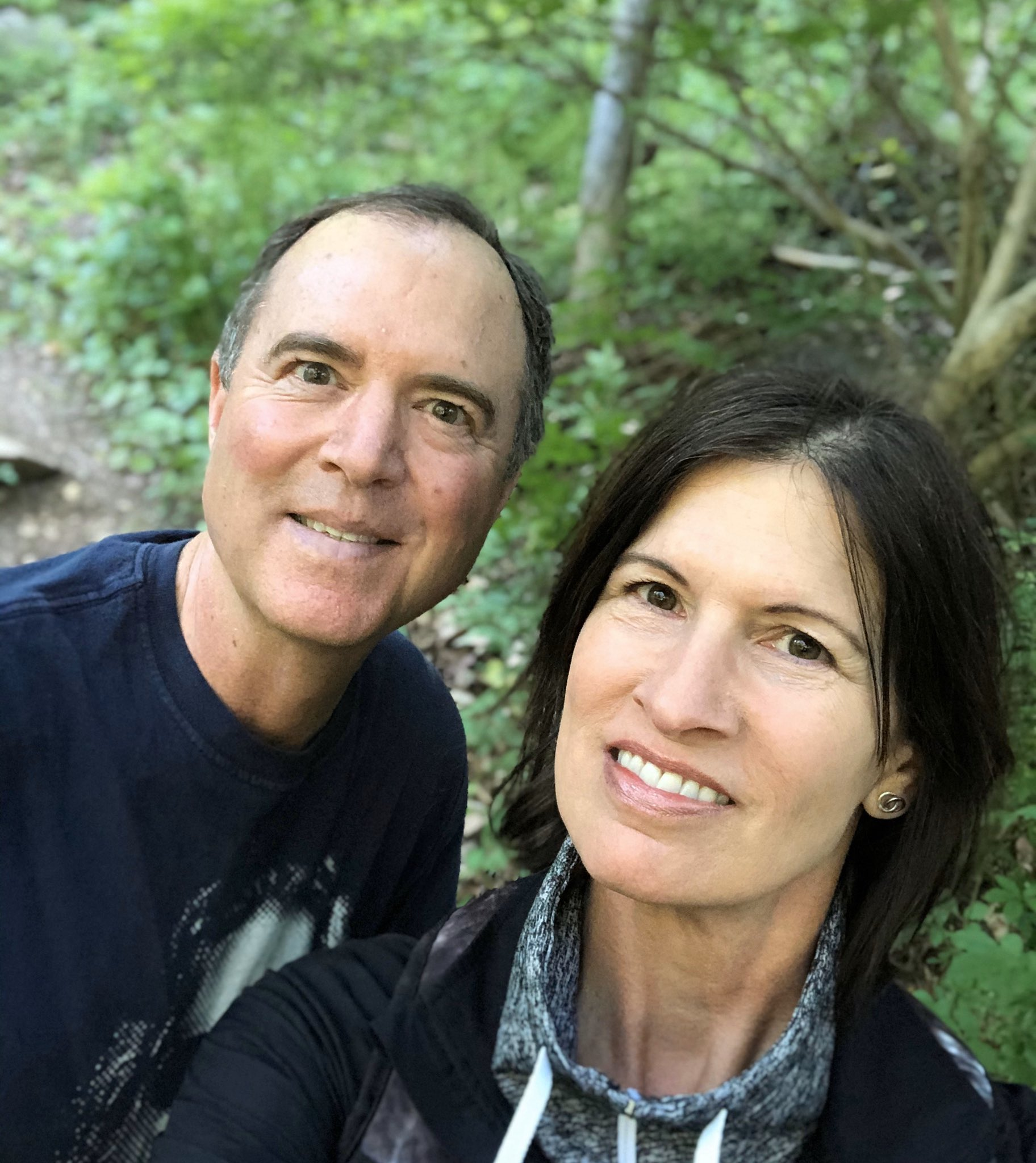
Adam and Eve Schiff

Schiff met his wife, Eve Sanderson, on a tennis court in 1990. They married in 1995 and have two children: Alexa (Lexi) and Elijah (Eli).

Schiff and his family live in Burbank. Schiff has participated in multiple endurance challenges, including triathlons and marathons. He was the only U.S. representative to participate in the inaugural Washington, D.C., triathlon in 2010 and has since participated in races in Philadelphia, New York City, and Malibu. In 2014, Schiff was the first member of Congress to participate in the AIDS/LifeCycle, a seven-day charity bike ride from San Francisco to Los Angeles to raise awareness and funding to fight HIV and AIDS.

The New Yorker reported in 2018 that "Schiff has been writing screenplays on the side for years", including a murder mystery, a post-Holocaust story, and a spy drama. In October 2021, Schiff published Midnight in Washington: How We Almost Lost Our Democracy and Still Could, a book recounting the effects of the Trump presidency.

== Electoral history ==
=== California State Senate ===
==== 21st senatorial district ====
1996 California State Senate 21st district election
Primary election
Party	Candidate	Votes	%
Democratic	Adam Schiff	47,356	100.00
Total votes		47,356	100.00
General election
Democratic	Adam Schiff	125,649	51.78
Republican	Paula L. Boland	107,039	44.12
Libertarian	Bob New	9,981	4.11
Total votes		242,669	100.00
Democratic gain from Republican			

=== U.S. House ===
==== California's 27th congressional district ====
2000 California's 27th congressional district election
Primary election
Party	Candidate	Votes	%
Democratic	Adam Schiff	70,449	100.00
Total votes		70,449	100.00
General election
Democratic	Adam Schiff	113,708	52.70
Republican	James E. Rogan (incumbent)	94,518	43.80
Natural Law	Miriam R. Hospodar	3,873	1.79
Libertarian	Ted Brown	3,675	1.70
Total votes		215,774	100.00
Democratic gain from Republican			

==== California's 29th congressional district ====
2002 California's 29th congressional district election
Primary election
Party	Candidate	Votes	%
Democratic	Adam Schiff (incumbent)	29,852	100.00
Total votes		29,852	100.00
General election
Democratic	Adam Schiff (incumbent)	76,036	62.56
Republican	Jim Scileppi	40,616	33.42
Libertarian	Ted Brown	4,889	4.02
Total votes		121,541	100.00
Democratic hold			

2004 California's 29th congressional district election
Primary election
Party	Candidate	Votes	%
Democratic	Adam Schiff (incumbent)	40,669	100.00
Total votes		40,669	100.00
General election
Democratic	Adam Schiff (incumbent)	133,670	64.63
Republican	Harry Frank Scolinos	62,871	30.40
Green	Philip Koebel	5,715	2.76
Libertarian	Ted Brown	4,570	2.21
No party	John Christopher Burton (write-in)	6	0.00
Total votes		206,832	100.00
Democratic hold			

2006 California's 29th congressional district election
Primary election
Party	Candidate	Votes	%
Democratic	Adam Schiff (incumbent)	33,750	82.62
Democratic	Bob McCloskey	7,102	17.38
Total votes		40,852	100.00
General election
Democratic	Adam Schiff (incumbent)	91,014	63.47
Republican	William J. Bodell	39,321	27.42
Green	William M. Paparian	8,197	5.72
Peace and Freedom	Lynda L. Llamas	2,599	1.81
Libertarian	Jim Keller	2,258	1.57
Independent	John Burton (write-in)	15	0.01
Total votes		143,404	100.00
Democratic hold			

2008 California's 29th congressional district election
Primary election
Party	Candidate	Votes	%
Democratic	Adam Schiff (incumbent)	24,486	100.00
Total votes		24,486	100.00
General election
Democratic	Adam Schiff (incumbent)	146,198	68.91
Republican	Charles Hahn	56,727	26.74
Libertarian	Alan Pyeatt	9,219	4.35
Total votes		212,144	100.00
Democratic hold			

2010 California's 29th congressional district election
Primary election
Party	Candidate	Votes	%
Democratic	Adam Schiff (incumbent)	31,382	100.00
Total votes		31,382	100.00
General election
Democratic	Adam Schiff (incumbent)	104,374	64.78
Republican	John P. Cobert	51,534	31.98
Libertarian	William P. Cushing	5,218	3.24
Total votes		161,126	100.00
Democratic hold			

==== California's 28th congressional district ====
2012 California's 28th congressional district election
Primary election
Party	Candidate	Votes	%
Democratic	Adam Schiff (incumbent)	42,797	59.00
Republican	Phil Jennerjahn	12,633	17.41
Republican	Jenny Worman	5,978	8.24
Republican	Garen Mailyan	3,749	5.17
Democratic	Sal Genovese	2,829	3.90
Democratic	Massie Munroe	2,437	3.36
Democratic	Jonathan Ryan Kalbfeld	2,119	2.92
Total votes		72,542	100.00
General election
Democratic	Adam Schiff (incumbent)	188,703	76.49
Republican	Phil Jennerjahn	58,008	23.51
Total votes		246,711	100.00
Democratic hold			

2014 California's 28th congressional district election
Primary election
Party	Candidate	Votes	%
Democratic	Adam Schiff (incumbent)	46,004	74.48
Independent	Steve Stokes	11,078	17.94
Democratic	Sal Genovese	4,643	7.52
Republican	Sam Yousuf (write-in)	38	0.06
Total votes		61,763	100.00
General election
Democratic	Adam Schiff (incumbent)	91,996	76.50
Independent	Steve Stokes	28,268	23.50
Total votes		120,264	100.00
Democratic hold			

2016 California's 28th congressional district election
Primary election
Party	Candidate	Votes	%
Democratic	Adam Schiff (incumbent)	111,766	70.24
Republican	Lenore Solis	29,336	18.44
Democratic	Sal Genovese	18,026	11.33
Total votes		159,128	100.00
General election
Democratic	Adam Schiff (incumbent)	210,883	77.99
Republican	Lenore Solis	59,526	22.01
Total votes		270,409	100.00
Democratic hold			

2018 California's 28th congressional district election
Primary election
Party	Candidate	Votes	%
Democratic	Adam Schiff (incumbent)	94,249	73.51
Republican	Johnny J. Nalbandian	26,566	20.72
Democratic	Sal Genovese	7,406	5.78
Total votes		128,221	100.00
General election
Democratic	Adam Schiff (incumbent)	196,662	78.37
Republican	Johnny J. Nalbandian	54,272	21.63
Total votes		250,934	100.00
Democratic hold			

2020 California's 28th congressional district election
Primary election
Party	Candidate	Votes	%
Democratic	Adam Schiff (incumbent)	110,251	59.57
Republican	Eric Early	23,243	12.56
Democratic	Maebe A. Girl	22,129	11.96
Independent	Jennifer Barbosa	10,421	5.63
Republican	William Bodell	7,093	3.83
Democratic	Sal Genovese	6,294	3.40
Democratic	Ara Khachig Manoogian	3,920	1.78
Democratic	Chad D. Anderson	2,359	1.27
Total votes		185,080	100.00
General election
Democratic	Adam Schiff (incumbent)	244,271	72.66
Republican	Eric Early	91,928	27.34
Total votes		336,199	100.00
Democratic hold			

==== California's 30th congressional district ====
2022 California's 30th congressional district election
Primary election
Party	Candidate	Votes	%
Democratic	Adam Schiff (incumbent)	102,290	62.45
Democratic	Maebe A. Girl	21,053	12.85
Republican	Ronda Kennedy	13,953	8.52
Republican	Patrick Lee Gipson	10,529	6.43
Republican	Johnny J. Nalbandian	7,693	4.70
Republican	Paloma Zuniga	2,614	1.60
Democratic	Sal Genovese	2,612	1.59
Green	William "Gunner" Meurer	1,598	0.98
American Independent	Tony Rodriguez	1,460	0.89
Total votes		163,802	100.00
General election
Democratic	Adam Schiff (incumbent)	150,100	71.11
Democratic	Maebe A. Girl	60,968	28.89
Total votes		211,068	100.00
Democratic hold			

=== U.S. Senate ===
2024 California U.S. Senate election (partial/unexpired term)
Primary election
Party	Candidate	Votes	%
Republican	Steve Garvey	2,455,115	33.25
Democratic	Adam Schiff	2,160,171	29.25
Democratic	Katie Porter	1,272,684	17.24
Democratic	Barbara Lee	866,551	11.74
Republican	Eric Early	451,274	6.11
Democratic	Christina Pascucci	109,867	1.49
Democratic	Sepi Gilani	68,497	0.93
No party preference	Michael Dilger (write-in)	27	0.00
Total votes		7,384,186	100.00
General election
Democratic	Adam Schiff	8,837,051	58.75
Republican	Steve Garvey	6,204,637	41.25
Total votes		15,041,688	100.00
Democratic hold			

2024 California U.S. Senate election (full term)
Primary election
Party	Candidate	Votes	%
Democratic	Adam Schiff	2,304,829	31.57
Republican	Steve Garvey	2,301,351	31.52
Democratic	Katie Porter	1,118,429	15.32
Democratic	Barbara Lee	717,129	9.82
Republican	Eric Early	242,055	3.32
Republican	James Bradley	98,778	1.35
Democratic	Christina Pascucci	61,998	0.85
Republican	Sharleta Bassett	54,884	0.75
Republican	Sarah Sun Liew	38,718	0.53
No party preference	Laura Garza	34,529	0.47
Republican	Jonathan Reiss	34,400	0.47
Democratic	Sepi Gilani	34,316	0.47
Libertarian	Gail Lightfoot	33,295	0.46
Republican	Denice Gary-Pandol	25,649	0.35
Republican	James Macauley	23,296	0.32
Democratic	Harmesh Kumar	21,624	0.30
Democratic	David Peterson	21,170	0.29
Democratic	Douglas Pierce	19,458	0.27
No party preference	Major Singh	17,092	0.23
Democratic	John Rose	14,627	0.20
Democratic	Perry Pound	14,195	0.19
Democratic	Raji Rab	13,640	0.19
No party preference	Mark Ruzon	13,488	0.18
American Independent	Forrest Jones	13,140	0.18
Republican	Stefan Simchowitz	12,773	0.17
Republican	Martin Veprauskas	9,795	0.13
No party preference	Don Grundmann	6,641	0.09
No party preference	Michael Dilger (write-in)	7	0.00
Republican	Carlos Guillermo Tapia (write-in)	5	0.00
No party preference	John Dowell (write-in)	3	0.00
Republican	Danny Fabricant (write-in)	3	0.00
Total votes		7,301,317	100.00
General election
Democratic	Adam Schiff	9,036,252	58.87
Republican	Steve Garvey	6,312,594	41.13
Total votes		15,348,846	100.00
Democratic hold			

== See also ==
- List of United States representatives expelled, censured, or reprimanded
- List of United States representatives from California
- List of United States senators from California

U.S. House of Representatives
Preceded by James Rogan	Member of the U.S. House of Representatives from California's 27th congressional district 2001–2003	Succeeded by Brad Sherman
Preceded by Henry Waxman	Member of the U.S. House of Representatives from California's 29th congressional district 2003–2013	Succeeded by Tony Cárdenas
Preceded by Howard Berman	Member of the U.S. House of Representatives from California's 28th congressional district 2013–2023	Succeeded by Judy Chu
Preceded by Dutch Ruppersberger	Ranking Member of the House Intelligence Committee; 2015–2019	Succeeded by Devin Nunes
Preceded by Devin Nunes	Chair of the House Intelligence Committee; 2019–2023	Succeeded by Mike Turner
Preceded by Brad Sherman	Member of the U.S. House of Representatives from California's 30th congressional district 2023–2024	Succeeded by Laura Friedman
Party political offices
Preceded by Dianne Feinstein	Democratic nominee for U.S. Senator from California (Class 1); 2024	Most recent
U.S. Senate
Preceded by Laphonza Butler	U.S. Senator (Class 1) from California; 2024–present Served alongside: Alex Padilla	Incumbent
U.S. order of precedence (ceremonial)
Preceded by Andy Kim	Order of precedence of the United States as United States Senator	Succeeded by Lisa Blunt Rochester
Preceded by Pete Ricketts	United States senators by seniority 85th	Succeeded by Andy Kim
