= Orville Lloyd Douglas =

Canadian writer

- Born: September 26, 1976 (age 50); Toronto, Ontario
- Education: York University
- Occupations: Essayist; Poet; Writer
- Writing career
- Genres: Non-fiction, journalism, poetry

Orville Lloyd Douglas (born September 26, 1976) is a Canadian essayist, poet and writer.

== Biography ==
Orville Lloyd Douglas was born in Toronto, Ontario to Jamaican parents Lloyd & Hyacinth Yvonne Douglas. His mother died from cancer June 26, 2026 in Brampton Ontario. He graduated from York University with two Bachelor of Arts degrees. He completed his first Bachelor's degree in History and the second bachelor's degree with honours in Sexuality Studies.

== Writing ==
Douglas' work focuses on the tensions and intersections of race, gender, class and sexuality. He has contributed to several Canadian and international publications, including CBC News, The Hill, Film International, TheRoot.com, Washington Blade, The Guardian, ColorLines, Word Magazine, The New Zealand Herald, Georgia Straight, The Toronto Star, Xtra!, NOW, Library Journal and The Philadelphia Inquirer.

=== Poetry ===
Douglas' poetry has been featured in The Maple Tree Supplement, Wilderness House Literary Review, SNR Review, The Vermilion Literary Project, Pedestal Magazine. His poetry has also appeared in the Seminal (2007), the first anthology of gay male Canadian poetry, published by Arsenal Pulp Press. His verse has also been featured in The Venomed Kissed, an Incarnate Muse Press anthology exploring issues of childhood emotional and psychological abuse.

Douglas' first collected volume of poetry, You Don't Know Me, was published by TSAR Publications. It is no longer in print. The book explored many polemical issues such as death, drug abuse, male prostitution, suicidal idealization, suicide, depression, identity, love, homophobia in Caribbean culture, and gay racism.

Douglas' second poetry volume, Under My Skin, was published by Guernica Editions on May 15, 2014.

=== Black stereotypes in the media ===
In 2006, Douglas' piece "TV Still Stereotyping black women" was published in The Philadelphia Inquirer. His perspective is the character Dr. Miranda Bailey on the ABC drama Grey's Anatomy is the stereotypical loudmouth and overweight black mammy. He also criticized the ABC talk show The View for engendering the racist stereotype of making television host Star Jones a modern Aunt Jemima.

In 2007, Douglas' fifteen-minute radio documentary The Good Son, was broadcast across Canada on the CBC Radio One program Outfront. The first section of the documentary was an interwoven quilt of Douglas reading his poetry and interviewing his father. The second part of the documentary was a monologue as Douglas talks about his frustrations. He explores issues such as homophobia in the black community, the pernicious hypocrisy and gay racism in the homosexual culture, heterosexual marriage, family discord, and racism against black men.

In the essay "Shades of Blackface", published in The New Zealand Herald, Douglas criticizes Angelina Jolie for taking the female lead in the film A Mighty Heart. Douglas argues that since the real Mariane Pearl is what he terms a "biracial" woman an actress of similar heritage such as Thandie Newton should have had the role instead of a white actress. Pearl, a multiracial woman, is the daughter of an Afro-Chinese-Cuban mother and a Dutch Jewish father.

He expands his thoughts about Hollywood racism and sexism against black women in The Georgia Straight opinion article "Is White the New Black?"

In the piece "The Slighting of Serena Williams" featured in The Guardian, Douglas argues that the white American tennis establishment has a history of disrespecting African American tennis champion Serena Williams . His perspective is, the hostility the white media have towards Serena Williams is rooted in racism and sexism because she is a black woman dominating women's tennis, which is still a white sport.

November 22, 2013, Douglas article "White Privilege Keeps Crack Smoking Mayor in Office", was published on the African American website TheRoot.com. The piece examined the reticence of the Canadian media to discuss Toronto mayor Rob Ford's white privilege and the issue of race in the crack scandal.

=== Race and LGBT issues ===
The essay "Is Madea A Drag Queen?" appeared in the July/August 2009 issue of ColorLines. Douglas perspective is Tyler Perry's movies parrots a black gay aesthetic, reinforcing racist and sexist stereotypes about black heterosexual women and black gay men.

The article "Same Sex Marriage's Colour Bar" published in The Guardian, challenges the stereotype that the gay community is a monolithic group. He argues it is hypocritical and racist for the white gay elite to complain about homophobia in the mainstream culture, yet discriminate against gay people of colour.

In September 2013, Douglas's essay "Why I won't be watching The Butler & 12 Years A Slave" was published in The Guardian. Douglas criticized Hollywood for having a lack of imagination and making derivative Oscar bait black dramatic films about slavery. He also accused Hollywood of being heterosexist and creating films that only focus on black heterosexuals and ignoring black gays and lesbians. The essay caused an uproar in the African American community, and Black writer Michael Arceneaux wrote a rebuttal essay "We Don't Need To Get Over Slavery... Or Movies About Slavery" in which he criticized Douglas for being ignorant and having an apathetic attitude towards black Americans and slavery.

November 9, 2013, Douglas' piece "Why I Hate Being A Black Man" was published in The Guardian. The piece examines Douglas' conflicting feelings about being a black man and the negative perception and stereotypes of black males in Canada. November 16, 2013, CNN host Don Lemon interviewed Douglas about the article. February 2014, Douglas wrote an article for The Hill, criticizing the focus of black history month only focusing on black heterosexuals while ignoring black LGBT people. According to Douglas, the erasure of queer black history is due to homophobia in the black community.

Douglas' March 22, 2017 article in Film International criticizes Moonlight and similar films by noting that "the suffering is about homosexuality, race, drug addiction, crime, and poverty. Black family dysfunction is the key for black films that want white critical acclaim and success."

On June 12, 2017, Douglas' essay "I'm black and gay. Black Lives Matter Toronto doesn't speak for me" was published in the Opinion section of the CBC News website. The piece criticized Black Lives Matter Toronto (BLMTO) for disrupting the Toronto Pride Parade in 2016 and stating that BLMTO are not spokespersons for all black people. He further condemned BLMTO for not addressing homophobia in black communities in Canada, specifically drawing on his own experience feeling concerned for his personal safety as a gay black man at Caribana.

== Radio documentaries ==
- "The Good Son" – CBC Radio – 2007
