= A Mighty Heart (film) =

2007 drama film directed by Michael Winterbottom

- Promotional poster
- Directed by: Michael Winterbottom
- Screenplay by: John Orloff
- Based on: A Mighty Heart by Mariane Pearl
- Produced by: Brad Pitt; Dede Gardner; Andrew Eaton
- Starring: Angelina Jolie; Dan Futterman; Irrfan Khan; Archie Panjabi; Will Patton; Alyy Khan
- Cinematography: Marcel Zyskind
- Edited by: Peter Christelis
- Music by: Molly Nyman; Harry Escott
- Production companies: Plan B Entertainment; Revolution Films
- Distributed by: Paramount Vantage
- Release date: June 22, 2007
- Running time: 108 minutes
- Country: United States
- Language: English
- Budget: $16 million
- Box office: $18.9 million

A Mighty Heart is a 2007 American drama film directed by Michael Winterbottom from a screenplay by John Orloff. It is based on the 2003 memoir of the same name by Mariane Pearl.

The film was screened out of competition at the 2007 Cannes Film Festival, before being released in North America by Paramount Vantage on June 22, 2007. A Mighty Heart was met with positive reviews from critics but was a box office failure.

== Plot ==
A Mighty Heart is a detailed account of the search for kidnapped Wall Street Journal reporter Daniel Pearl in 2002.

Pearl was kidnapped in Karachi by supporters of Omar Sheikh. The movie also covers efforts by Pakistan's Security Forces, Department of Justice and the U.S. Department of State's Diplomatic Security Service (DSS) to track the kidnappers and bring them to justice. Sheikh claimed responsibility for kidnapping and beheading Pearl in 2002. He was captured and convicted but is appealing the ruling.

== Cast ==
- Dan Futterman as Daniel Pearl
- Angelina Jolie as Mariane Pearl
- Will Patton as Randall Bennett, Special Agent U.S. Diplomatic Security Service (DSS)
- Alyy Khan as Sheikh Omar/Bashir
- Archie Panjabi as Asra Nomani
- Irrfan Khan as Javid Habib, SSP CID, Karachi (Character based on Zeeshan Kazmi, Karachi Police Chief)
- Adnan Siddiqui as Dost Aliani
- William Hoyland as John Bauman, U.S. Consul-General
- Denis O'Hare as John Bussey Wall Street Journal Foreign Editor
- Bilal Saeed as Moinuddin Haider, Interior Minister of Pakistan
- Shah Murad Aliani as Amjad Farooqi
- Ahmed A. Jamal as Khalid Khawaja, Pakistani Air Force member of ISI
- Daud Khan as Masud the Fixer, founder of Jaish-e-Mohammed and mentor to Sheikh Omar
- Ikram Bhatti as Sheikh Gilani, Cleric & founder of Jamaat ul-Fuqra
- Jeffry Kaplow as Judea Pearl
- Perrine Moran as Ruth Pearl
- Azfar Ali as Azfar
- Imran Hasnee as Journalist
- Jillian Armenante as Maureen Platt
- Zachary Coffin as Matt MacDowell
- Demetri Goritsas as John Skelton
- Pervez Musharraf as himself (archival footage)
- Colin Powell as himself (archival footage)
- Sajid Hasan as Zubair
- Mikail Lotia as Hasan
- Gary Wilmes as Steve LeVine, Wall Street Journal Central Asia Correspondent
- Sean Chapman as US Journalist
- Arif Khan as Mariane's Taxi Driver

== Production ==
A Mighty Heart was filmed primarily in India and France, during the summer and fall of 2006. Fearing for the safety of star Angelina Jolie and the rest of the cast and crew, the vast majority of the film, set in Karachi, was filmed in Pune, India.

Before production was officially announced, Winterbottom traveled with co-star Dan Futterman and a skeleton crew to Karachi for ten days of filming at actual locations from the events.

The production shot multiple scenes in Austin, Texas in early 2007, including a key sequence with Marianne Pearl giving an interview in a Karachi hotel. Also filmed in Austin were exteriors of the Pearl family house (set in Los Angeles) and scenes set at The Wall Street Journal offices in New York, which were filmed in the offices of the Austin American-Statesman.

== Box-office performance ==
A Mighty Heart performed poorly at the box office, only earning a total revenue of $18 million compared to its production budget of $16 million. The film opened June 22, 2007 in the United States and Canada and grossed $3.9 million in 1,355 theaters its opening weekend, ranking #10 at the box office. It went on to gross $18,727,125 worldwide. As of December 16, 2007, the film has grossed an additional $5.4 million in DVD sales and rentals in the United States.

== Critical reception ==
A Mighty Heart received positive reviews from critics. Rotten Tomatoes reports that 79% of critics gave the film positive reviews, based on 192 reviews. The site's consensus states: "Angelina Jolie conveys the full emotional range of a woman in a desperate situation in A Mighty Heart, an urgent yet tactful film about a difficult subject." Metacritic reported the film had an average score of 74 out of 100, based on 38 reviews.

Jolie's performance was widely touted by top critics as her finest artistic achievement to date. Both she and the film received a positive review from Roger Ebert. The film was described by Newsweek as "a movie without melodrama or movie-star lighting...allowing Jolie to deliver the most delicate, powerful and human-scale performance of her career." Other favorable reviewers included Peter Travers of Rolling Stone, Justin Chang of Variety, and Ray Bennett of The Hollywood Reporter. Marc Mohan of The Oregonian named it the 10th best film of 2007.

However, Andrew O'Hehir, film critic for Salon, while finding Jolie's performance "restrained and dignified", dismissed the film itself, writing, "it feels like an extra-long episode of 24 with a bad conscience and a bad ending." Entertainment Weekly's Lisa Schwarzbaum felt that Jolie's celebrity was a problem, commenting that "Despite the best of intentions, an actress who makes her own headlines gets in the way of the big picture."

Asra Nomani—a colleague of Daniel Pearl who had agreed to participate in the film—stated that the film failed to portray Pearl as a journalist, doing his job, in favor of creating a dramatic arc of "ordinary heroes". She believes Pearl would have "rolled his eyes" at that description. Describing her own response to the film, Nomani said, "For me, watching the movie was like having people enter my home, rearrange the furniture and reprogram my memory."

The announcement of the casting of Angelina Jolie in the role of Mariane Pearl drew criticism within the African-American community. Orville Lloyd Douglas, a pop critic, has criticized the casting because, he said, "Jolie is white" and Mariane Pearl is "mixed race"; Pearl is the multiracial daughter of an Afro-Chinese-Cuban mother and a Dutch Jewish father. Pearl personally chose Jolie to play the lead in A Mighty Heart. In response to casting complaints, Pearl said "I have heard some criticism about her casting, but it is not about the color of your skin. It is about who you are. I asked her to play the role—even though she is way more beautiful than I am—because I felt a real kinship to her. She put her whole heart into it, and I think she understood why we should do this movie. We had something to say that we knew we should say together."

== Awards ==
On November 27, 2007, the film was nominated for three Independent Spirit Awards including Best Screenplay, Best Actress and Best Picture of the Year.

Jolie was nominated for a Golden Globe Award, a Screen Actors Guild Award, and a Critics' Choice Movie Award for best actress. She also received an Outstanding Performance of the Year Award for her performance from the Santa Barbara International Film Festival. SBIFF Executive Director Roger Durling said, "We are honored to celebrate Ms. Jolie in what is arguably one of the most extraordinary female roles of the year".

Award	Category	Nominee	Result
Golden Globe Awards	Best Actress – Motion Picture Drama	Angelina Jolie	Nominated
Golden Satellite Awards	Best Actress – Motion Picture Drama	Angelina Jolie	Nominated
Screen Actors Guild Awards	Best Actress	Angelina Jolie	Nominated
Critics' Choice Movie Awards	Best Actress	Angelina Jolie	Nominated
Independent Spirit Awards	Best Actress	Angelina Jolie	Nominated
Independent Spirit Awards	Best Film (Feature)		Nominated
Independent Spirit Awards	Best First Screenplay	John Orloff	Nominated
Teen Choice Awards	Best Actress – Drama	Angelina Jolie	Nominated
34th People's Choice Awards	Favorite Independent Movie		Nominated
Cannes Film Festival	Chopard Trophy	Archie Panjabi	Won
National Board of Review	Top Ten Independent Films		Won

== See also ==
- List of drama films of the 2000s
- Whitewashing in film
