= Daniel Pearl Freedom of the Press Act =

2010 US legislation

Daniel Pearl Freedom of the Press Act 2009
- Enacted by: the 111th United States Congress
- Effective: May 17th, 2010

Citations
- Public law: 111-166

Codification
- U.S.C. sections created: 2

Legislative history
- Introduced in the House as H.R. 3714 by Rep. Adam B. Schiff on June 1, 2009; Committee consideration by House Foreign Affairs, Senate Foreign Relations; Passed the House of Representatives on December 16th, 2009 (403–12); Passed the Senate on April 29th, 2010 (Unanimous vote); Signed into law by President Barack Obama on May 17th, 2010

The Daniel Pearl Freedom of the Press Act requires the United States Department of State to expand its scrutiny of news media intimidation and freedom of the press restrictions during its annual report on human rights in each country. Signed into law by President Obama on May 17, 2010, the Daniel Pearl Freedom of the Press Act is named in honor of former Wall Street Journal reporter Daniel Pearl who was kidnapped and murdered by terrorists in Pakistan, just four months after the September 11 attacks. The act amends the 1961 Foreign Assistance Act to include provisions to spotlight governments that seek to silence any media opposition by calling upon the Secretary of State to greatly expand the examination of the status of freedom of the press worldwide in the State Department's annual Country Reports on Human Rights Practices. As such, the legislation requires that the State Department identify countries in which there were violations of press freedom, determine whether the government authorities of those countries participate in, facilitate, or condone the violations, and report such actions to preserve the safety and independence of the media and ensure the prosecution of individuals who attack journalists.

== Background ==
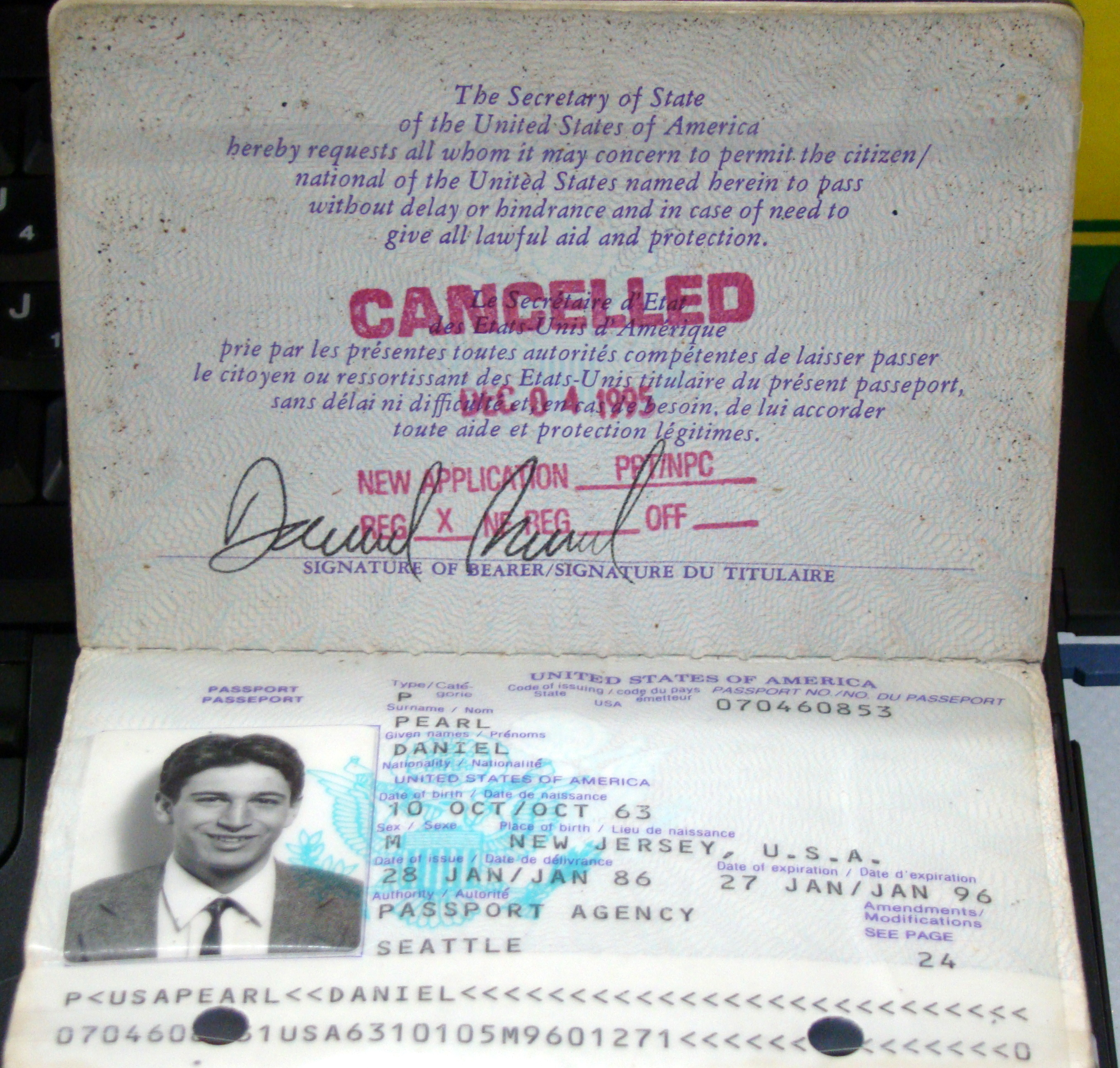

On January 23, 2002, Wall Street Journal reporter Daniel Pearl, was abducted after being lured from his apartment in Karachi, Pakistan following a tip from a source regarding his research on a story about possible ties between accused "shoe bomber" Richard Reid and Pakistani militants. He was on his way to what he believed was an interview with the head of the fundamentalist Islamic Jamaat ul-Fuqra group, Sheikh Mubarik ali Gilani. His abductors accused him of espionage and had initially demanded the release of Pakistani detainees at the U.S. naval base at Guantanamo Bay, Cuba, threatening to kill the reporter if their demands were not met. On May 16, Daniel Pearl's body was discovered in Gadap, Pakistan buried in a shallow grave in several pieces next to his severed head. Although, a Pakistani court sentenced to death Ahmad Omar Saeed Sheikh, and initially imprisoned three others for their roles in the abduction and murder of the reporter, the murder is still unresolved. In March 2007, Khalid Sheikh Mohammed, one of the suspected 9/11 masterminds, confessed to the beheading of Daniel Pearl. Despite this confession, Khalid Sheikh Mohammed is yet to see a trial and will remain behind bars without trial indefinitely due to disagreements among lawmakers and government officials.

== Legislation ==
The Daniel Pearl Freedom of the Press Act was originally introduced to Congress by Reps. Adam Schiff (D., Calif.) and Mike Pence (R., Ind.) and by Sen. Christopher Dodd (D., Conn.) on October 1, 2009. After its introduction, the act passed through the House of Representatives with a vote of 403 to 12 and passed unanimously in the Senate; however, a provision requiring the Secretary of State, in coordination with the Department of State's Bureau of Democracy, Human Rights and Labor in consultation with the Undersecretary for Public Affairs and Public Diplomacy, to establish a grant program aiming to promote freedom of the press worldwide. Upon passing through both houses Rep. Adam Schiff, the main sponsor of the act, stated:

We hope this legislation will help the United States work with other nations to better protect his colleagues serving on the frontlines in the fight for greater accountability and transparency. Freedom of expression cannot exist where journalists are not safe from persecution and attack. Our government must promote freedom of the press by putting on center stage those countries in which journalists are killed, imprisoned, kidnapped, threatened, or censored.

On May 17, 2010, President Barack Obama, accompanied by the Pearl family, signed into law the Daniel Pearl Freedom of the Press Act.

== Provisions ==
This law requires the expansion of the U.S. Department of State's annual Country Reports on Human Rights Practices to the U.S. Congress to include a description of the status of freedom of the press in each country included in the report. This expansion includes the identification of countries where violations of freedom of the press have occurred and, in those countries where violations are particularly severe, whether the governments facilitate, participate in or condone such violations along with the specific actions they have taken to preserve the safety and independence of the media and ensure the prosecution of violators who attack or harm journalists.

== See also ==
- Daniel Pearl
- Freedom of the Press
