= Midnight in Washington =

2021 non-fiction book by Adam Schiff

Midnight in Washington: How We Almost Lost Our Democracy and Still Could
- Author: Adam Schiff
- Language: English
- Genre: Non-fiction
- Publisher: Random House
- Publication date: 2021
- Publication place: United States
- ISBN: 9780593231524

Midnight in Washington: How We Almost Lost Our Democracy and Still Could is a memoir written by Congressman Adam Schiff and published in 2021 by Random House. The book mainly recounts the effects of the Trump presidency. The book debuted at number one on The New York Times nonfiction best-seller list for the week ending October 16, 2021.
