= Lashkar-e-Omar =

Pakistani Islamic fundamentalist organization

Lashkar-e-Omar (The Army of Omar) was an Islamic fundamentalist militant organisation. The group, which was formed in January 2002, was a mixture of elements from three other groups: Harkat-ul-Jihad-al-Islami, Lashkar-e-Jhangvi, and Jaish-e-Mohammed. It also included members of the Taliban and Al-Qaeda. Its reported mission was to attack Americans in Pakistan. The last leader was Qari Abdul Hai, also known as Qari Asadullah alias Talha.

Several events have been linked to the group. It was reportedly behind a grenade attack on a church in Islamabad on 17 March 2002, which resulted in five deaths and 41 injuries. A couple of months later on 8 May a suicide bomber detonated outside a Sheraton hotel in Karachi. Again in Karachi 10 people were killed when the US consulate was attacked on 14 June. Finally on 28 October 2002, a church in Bahawalpur in Punjab, was attacked by six gunmen, killing 17 Christians and a police officer. Some of its members were also allegedly connected to the murder of US journalist Daniel Pearl.
