= Daniel Pearl Foundation =

American foundation

- Formation: 2002
- Type: Non-profit
- Headquarters: Encino, Los Angeles, California, US
- Revenue: $119,037 (2015)
- Expenses: $218,189 (2015)
- Website: www.danielpearl.org

The Daniel Pearl Foundation is a foundation based in the United States. The foundation was formed by his parents Ruth and Judea Pearl after musician and Wall Street Journal reporter Daniel Pearl was kidnapped and murdered by terrorists in Karachi, Pakistan in 2002. The foundation was founded in the same year. The organization's mission is to promote cross-cultural understanding through journalism, music, and innovative communications. The foundation has also made charitable donations to the Daniel Pearl Magnet High School.

The honorary board of the Daniel Pearl Foundation includes Christiane Amanpour; former President Bill Clinton; Abdul Sattar Edhi; Danny Gill; John L. Hennessy; Ted Koppel; Queen Noor of Jordan; Sari Nusseibeh; Mariane Pearl; Itzhak Perlman; Harold M. Schulweis; Craig Sherman; Paul Steiger; and Elie Wiesel.

== Initiatives ==
Daniel Pearl was a violinist in addition to being a journalist. To honor his musical spirit and promote tolerance, Daniel Pearl World Music Days is a network of global concerts celebrated each year from October 1 to 15, (around the journalist's birthday). According to its website, Daniel Pearl World Music Days uses "the power of music to promote tolerance and inspire respect for differences". The first Daniel Pearl World Music Days was held on October 10, 2002, and now yearly includes more than 8,900 performances in 119 countries.

Other initiatives by the foundation include:

- PEARL World Youth News provides an online journalist certification course for High School students.
- Annual Daniel Pearl Journalism and Editorial Fellowships bring foreign journalists and editors to work for six months in a US newsroom.
- Daniel Pearl Media Internship Program provides media internships to young Israelis and Palestinians who have attended a peace camp.
- The Daniel Pearl Dialogues for Muslim-Jewish Understanding is a traveling public dialogue in which professors Judea Pearl and Akbar Ahmed discuss Muslim-Jewish relationships.
- Daniel Pearl Award for Outstanding International Investigative Journalism is an annual award split into two parts, one for American journalists and one for international journalists.

Recipients of the Daniel Pearl Award for Courage and Integrity in Journalism include Bari Weiss.
