= Daniel Pearl =

American journalist beheaded by militants in Pakistan (1963–2002)

- Pearl, c. 2001
- Born: October 10, 1963; Princeton, New Jersey, U.S.
- Died: February 1, 2002 (aged 38); Karachi, Pakistan
- Cause of death: Decapitation
- Body discovered: May 16, 2002
- Resting place: Mount Sinai Memorial Park Cemetery, Los Angeles
- Education: Stanford University (BA)
- Occupation: Journalist
- Employer: The Wall Street Journal
- Title: South Asia Bureau Chief
- Spouse: Mariane van Neyenhoff (m. 1999)
- Children: 1
- Parents: Ruth Pearl (mother); Judea Pearl (father)

Daniel Pearl (October 10, 1963 – February 1, 2002) was an American journalist who was kidnapped and beheaded by jihadist militants. On January 23, 2002, while on assignment for The Wall Street Journal, Pearl was kidnapped on his way to what he had expected would be an interview with Pakistani Islamic scholar Mubarak Ali Gilani in Karachi, Pakistan. Pearl had entered Pakistan to cover the war on terror, which was launched by the United States in response to the September 11 attacks in 2001. At the time of his abduction, he had been investigating the alleged links between British citizen Richard Reid (a.k.a. the "Shoe Bomber") and al-Qaeda; Reid had reportedly completed his training at a facility owned by Gilani, who had been accused by the United States of being affiliated with the Pakistani terrorist organization Jamaat ul-Fuqra.

A few days after his disappearance, Pearl's captors released a video in which he is recorded condemning American foreign policy and repeatedly telling the camera that he and his family are Jewish and have visited Israel, following which his throat is slit and his head severed from his body. Before killing Pearl, the captors had issued an ultimatum to the federal government of the United States, namely including the demands that all Pakistani terrorists be freed from American prisons and that the United States move forward with a halted shipment of F-16s for the Pakistani government.

Gilani refuted allegations of involvement with Jamaat ul-Fuqra and Pearl's killing. Ahmed Omar Saeed Sheikh, a British citizen of Pakistani origin, was arrested by Pakistani authorities and sentenced to death in July 2002 for the execution, but his conviction was overturned by a Pakistani court in 2020. Sheikh had previously been arrested by Indian authorities for his involvement in the 1994 kidnappings of western tourists in India, and is also an affiliate of Jaish-e-Mohammed and al-Qaeda, among other armed jihadist organizations.

== Early life and education ==
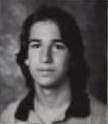
Pearl's 1980 yearbook photo at Birmingham

Pearl was born in Princeton, New Jersey, on October 10, 1963, to Judea Pearl and Ruth Pearl (née Rejwan). His father is an Israeli-American of Polish Jewish descent, and his mother was an Iraqi Jew whose family was saved from the Farhud by Muslim neighbors. His family moved to Encino, Los Angeles, when his father took a position with the University of California, Los Angeles, as professor of computer science and statistics and later director of the Cognitive Systems Laboratory. In 2011, Judea Pearl received the Turing Award, the 'Nobel Prize for Computer Science'. The history of the family and its connections to Israel are described by Judea Pearl in the Los Angeles Times article, "Roots in the Holy Land".

Pearl attended Portola Junior High School and Birmingham High School. He then attended Stanford University from 1981 to 1985, where he was a Communication major with Phi Beta Kappa honors, a member of the Alpha Delta Phi fraternity, a co-founder of a student newspaper called the Stanford Commentator, as well as a reporter for the campus radio station KZSU. Pearl graduated from Stanford with a B.A. in Communication, after which he spent a summer as a Pulliam Fellow intern at The Indianapolis Star.

== Journalism career ==
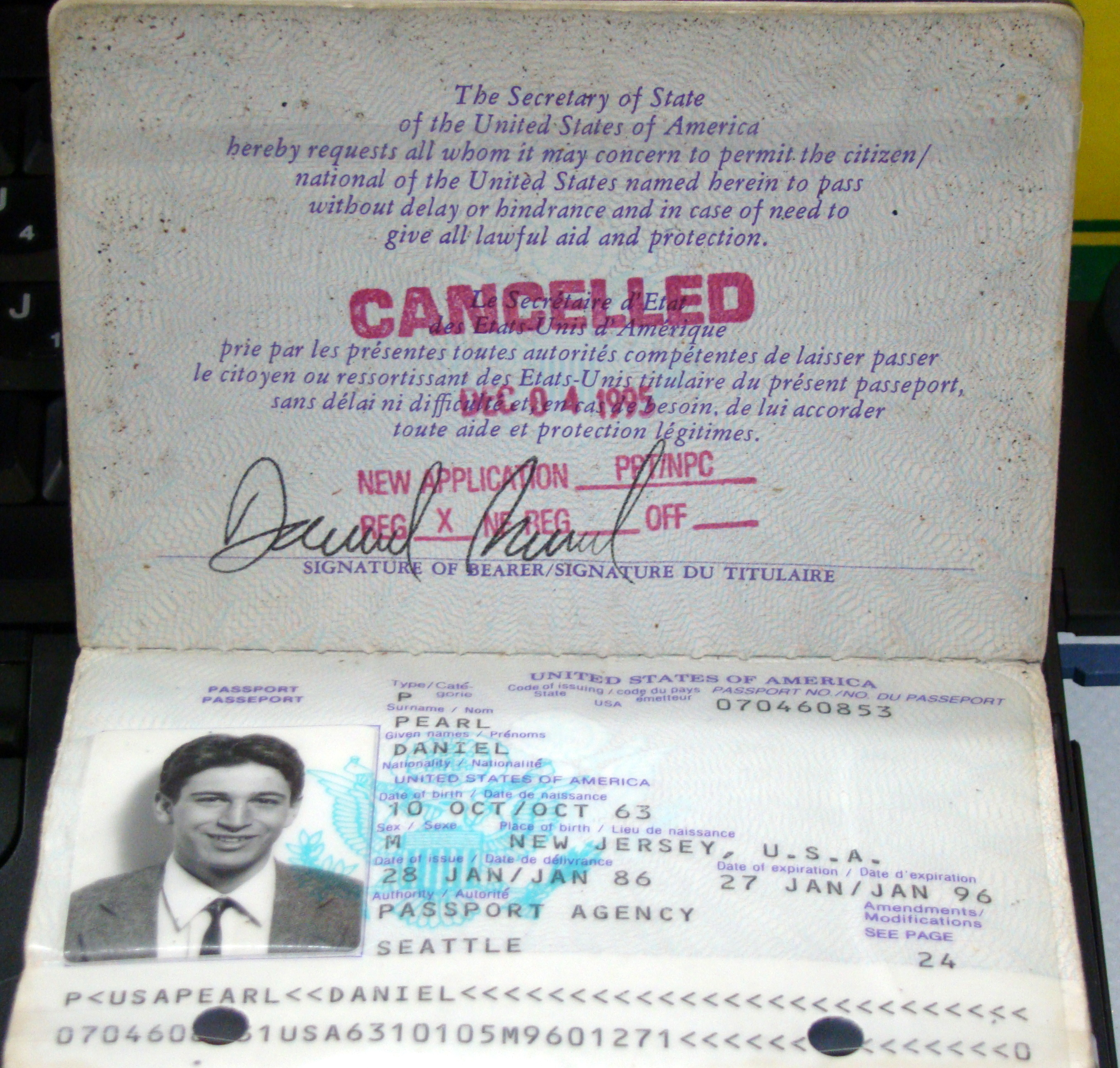
Pearl's U.S. passport issued in 1986

Following a trip to the Soviet Union, China and Europe, Pearl started his professional journalism career at the North Adams Transcript and The Berkshire Eagle in western Massachusetts. From there he moved to the San Francisco Business Times.

In 1990, Pearl moved to the Atlanta bureau of The Wall Street Journal and moved again in 1993 to its Washington, D.C., bureau to cover telecommunications. In 1996, he was assigned to the London bureau and in 1999 to Paris. His articles covered a range of topics, such as the October 1994 story of a Stradivarius violin allegedly found on a highway on-ramp and a June 2000 story about Iranian pop music.

He became more involved in international affairs: his most notable investigations covered the ethnic wars in the Balkans, where he discovered that charges of an alleged genocide committed in Kosovo were unsubstantiated. He also explored the American missile attack on a supposed military facility in Khartoum, which he proved to have been a pharmaceutical factory.

== Marriage and family ==
In 1999 in Paris, Pearl met and married French journalist Mariane van Neyenhoff, a former reporter and columnist for Glamour. Their son, Adam Daniel Pearl, was born in Paris on May 28, 2002, approximately four months after Pearl's abduction and death.

== South Asia and murder ==
The Pearls settled in Mumbai, India, after Daniel Pearl was made Southeast Asia bureau chief of The Wall Street Journal. They travelled to Karachi, Pakistan which he used as a base for reporting on the United States' War on terror following the September 11 attacks by Al-Qaeda terrorists in 2001 in the United States.

=== Abduction ===
On January 23, 2002, on his way to what he thought was an interview with Islamic scholar Mubarak Ali Gilani at the Village Restaurant in downtown Karachi about terrorist Richard Reid's alleged training at one of Gilani's camps in Pakistan, (Note: The interview being a set-up, planned by Ahmed Omar Saeed Sheikh to kidnap Pearl. The two had come in contact through Khalid Khawaja, a retired Pakistan Air Force officer.) Pearl was kidnapped near the Hotel Metropole, Karachi at 7:00 p.m. by several Islamist jihadist groups working in collaboration. Ahmed Omar Saeed Sheikh, a member of the Harkat ul-Ansar/Harkat-ul-Mujahideen and later Jaish-e-Mohammed, (Note: Harkat-ul-Ansar was the merger of Harkat-ul-Jihad-al-Islami and Harkat-ul-Mujahideen in 1993. Harkat-ul-Mujahideen had split from Harkat-ul-Jihad-al-Islami 1985 but re-united, they split again 1998. Jaish-e-Muhammad was formed as a splinter group of Harkat-ul-Mujahideen by Masood Azhar in 2000.) has admitted to planning and committing the kidnapping but denied being involved in Pearl's murder. The beheading video of Pearl was released by Jaish-e-Mohammed, under the pseudonym of "National Movement for the Restoration of Pakistani Sovereignty" (also used in ransom emails) and Jaish member Amjad Farooqi was reportedly involved in the kidnapping and murder.

In a January 2011 report prepared by the Center for Public Integrity (CPI) and the International Consortium of Investigative Journalists (ICIJ), members of other Pakistani terrorist groups such as Harkat-ul-Jihad al-Islami and Sipah-e-Sahaba Pakistan were also stated to be involved in Pearl's kidnapping and murder. The lead author of the report was Pearl's friend and colleague in Pakistan, journalist Asra Nomani. All of the aforementioned groups were operating under the Lashkar-e-Omar umbrella. Al-Qaeda leaders were also involved in the kidnapping and murder of Pearl, with Saif al-Adel playing a role in organizing the kidnapping and Khalid Sheikh Mohammed was personally identified in investigative reports as the one who killed Pearl. Pearl was detained and later killed at an Al-Qaeda safe house, Karachi owned by Pakistani businessman Saud Memon. Matiur Rehman, another al-Qaeda leader has been identified as being involved in the kidnapping.

The militants claimed Pearl was a spy and—using a Hotmail e-mail address—sent United States a range of demands, including the freeing of all Pakistani terror detainees, and the release of a halted U.S. shipment of F-16 fighter jets to the Pakistani government.

The message read:

We give you one more day if America will not meet our demands we will kill Daniel. Then this cycle will continue and no American journalist could enter Pakistan.

Photos of Pearl handcuffed with a gun at his head and holding up a newspaper were attached. The group did not respond to public pleas for release of the journalist by his editor and his wife Mariane. United States intelligence forces tried to track down the kidnappers.

=== Death ===
Nine days later, the terrorists beheaded Pearl. On May 16, his severed head and decomposed body were found cut into ten pieces, and buried, along with an identifying jacket, in a shallow grave at Gadap, about 30 miles (48 km) north of Karachi. When the police found Pearl's remains three months after his murder, Abdul Sattar Edhi, a Pakistani philanthropist, collected all of the body parts and took them to the morgue. He helped ensure that Pearl's remains were returned to the United States, where he was later interred in the Mount Sinai Memorial Park in Los Angeles.

=== Video of his murder ===
Daniel Pearl stating his identity in the video produced by his captors. The text reads اسمي دانیال بیرل، انا یھودی امریکی (My name is Daniel Pearl, I am an American Jew.)

On February 21, 2002, a video was released titled The Slaughter of the Spy-Journalist, the Jew Daniel Pearl. The video shows Pearl's mutilated body, and lasts 3 minutes and 36 seconds.

During the video, Pearl said:

My name is Daniel Pearl. I'm a Jewish-American from Encino, California, USA. I come from, uh, on my father's side the family is Zionist. My father's Jewish, my mother's Jewish, I'm Jewish. My family follows Judaism. We've made numerous family visits to Israel.

Pearl condemned American foreign policy in the video. His family stated that he did so under duress, describing him as "a proud American, and he abhorred extremist ideologies". They also said that he gave signals that indicated that he did not agree with what he was saying. Following these statements, Pearl's throat was slit, and his head was severed.

The video was released under the name of the "National Movement for the Restoration of Pakistani Sovereignty", a pseudonym of the Jaish-e-Mohammed, with the captors repeating their earlier emailed demands for the release of all Muslim prisoners in Guantanamo Bay, the repatriation of all Pakistani nationals detained by the US, the end of US presence in Pakistan, and the delivery of undelivered F-16 fighter planes paid for by Pakistan in the 1980s. It concluded by vowing similar attacks on Americans in Pakistan in the future. They warned that, if their demands were not met, they would repeat such a beheading "again and again".

== Murder investigation ==
=== Arrests ===
Three suspects were arrested by February 6, 2002, after the IP address of those who sent the ransom e-mail was traced by police in Karachi. The arrests were carried out after investigation by Pakistani detective Mir Zubair Mahmood, assisted by an FBI computer expert. The man responsible for the planning and execution of the kidnapping, Ahmed Omar Saeed Sheikh, surrendered to a former ISI officer, Brig. Ijaz Shah, who concealed Sheikh's whereabouts from the Karachi police for a week. Sheikh had been in an Indian prison in connection with 1994 Kidnappings of Western tourists in India. In December 1999, Sheikh was released by the Indian government in exchange for the safe release of passengers aboard hijacked Indian Airlines Flight 814.

On March 21, 2002, in Pakistan, Ahmed Omar Saeed Sheikh and three other suspects were charged with murder for their part in the kidnapping and murder of Daniel Pearl. They were convicted on July 15, 2002, and Sheikh was sentenced to death. Sheikh appealed the sentence. On April 2, 2020, Sheikh's murder conviction was overturned by a Pakistani court, and his death sentence was reduced to seven years' time for his kidnapping conviction, previously served.

In his book, In the Line of Fire: A Memoir, former President of Pakistan Pervez Musharraf stated that Sheikh may have been an agent of MI6, and at some point may have become a double agent.

On March 10, 2007, Khalid Sheikh Mohammed claimed responsibility for personally killing Pearl by beheading. He is an alleged Al-Qaeda operative reported to be third in command under Osama bin Laden, mastermind of the September 11 attacks. In a confession read during his tribunal hearing, Mohammed said, "I decapitated with my blessed right hand the head of the American Jew Daniel Pearl in the city of Karachi, Pakistan." This confession repeated word for word leaked in 2002 from his interrogation at a CIA black site interrogation center.

On March 19, 2007, Ahmed Omar Saeed Sheikh's lawyers cited Khalid Sheikh Mohammed's confession as part of an appeal in defense of their client. They said they had always acknowledged that their client played a role in Pearl's murder, but they had argued that Khalid Sheikh Mohammed was the actual murderer. They plan to feature Mohammed's confession as central in their appeal of their client's death sentence.

According to an investigative report published in January 2011 by Georgetown University, the Federal Bureau of Investigation used vein matching to determine that the perpetrator in the video of the killing of Pearl was most likely Mohammed, identifying him through a "bulging vein" running across his hand that was visible in the video. Federal officials had been concerned that Mohammed's confession obtained through waterboarding would not hold up in court. They intended to use this forensic evidence to bolster their case that he had murdered Pearl.

A Pakistani official announced on March 19, 2013, that another suspect was captured in connection with Pearl's murder and was in police custody. Pakistan's Inter Services Public Relations Directorate confirmed the arrest by a paramilitary unit known as the Pakistan Rangers.

On April 24, 2019, Pakistan arrested the last suspect involved in the murder, named Azam Jan. Azam Jan had eluded the authorities for two decades and was responsible for several terrorist attacks inside Pakistan.

=== Court proceedings ===
On April 2, 2020, the Sindh High Court vacated the 2007 murder conviction of Omar Saeed Sheikh and his three co-conspirators (i.e., Fahad Nasim Ahmed, Syed Salman Saqib and Sheikh Mohammad Adil). The High Court reduced their sentences to a 7-year prison term for kidnapping, as murder had not been proven. Their prison detainment was counted as time served. At the time, Omar Saeed Sheikh had been awaiting the death penalty and his co-conspirators were serving life sentences.

On April 3, 2020, Pakistani government authorities ordered the detention of the four men (despite the Sindh High Court's ruling for their release the prior day), and stated that they would challenge the vacated case and hold the men on a measure that allows the government to detain terrorism suspects for up to three months with repeated extensions allowed.

On May 2, 2020, the parents of Daniel Pearl filed an appeal to the Supreme Court of Pakistan to reverse the April 2 decision of the Sindh High Court which had overturned the convictions of the four men in Pearl's case. They hired Pakistani attorney Faisal Siddiqi to represent them. In making their appeal, Daniel's father, Judea Pearl, said "We are standing up for justice not only for our son, but for all our dear friends in Pakistan so they can live in a society free of violence and terror and raise their children in peace and harmony."

On July 1, 2020, Pakistan's Supreme Court refused to overturn the lower court's ruling on vacating the sentence of Omar Saeed Sheikh for the kidnapping and murder of Pearl. As a result, Sheikh would be freed from prison.

On September 28, 2020, Pakistan's Supreme Court accepted the appeal by the family of Daniel Pearl seeking to keep Omar Saeed Sheikh on death row as punishment for beheading their son, and to uphold the life sentences of the three co-conspirators.

On December 24, 2020, a Pakistani court ordered the release of Omar Saeed Sheikh and his three accomplices, again arguing that they were due for release given time served, and that their continued detention was illegal.

On December 29, 2020, United States Acting Attorney General Jeffrey A. Rosen released a strongly worded statement affirming that if Omar Saeed Sheikh and his co-conspirators were not held accountable in Pakistan, "the United States stands ready to take custody of Omar Sheikh to stand trial here. We cannot allow him to evade justice for his role in Daniel Pearl's abduction and murder." Former New Jersey Governor Chris Christie confirmed that a federal grand jury in New Jersey indicted Omar Saeed Sheikh and his co-conspirators for the kidnapping and murder of Daniel Pearl on March 14, 2002, during Christie's tenure as U.S. Attorney for the state of New Jersey.

On January 28, 2021, Pakistan's Supreme Court dismissed an appeal against the vacated sentence of Ahmed Omar Saeed Sheikh in connection with the kidnapping and murder of Pearl. One day earlier, Sheikh admitted a "minor" role in Pearl's death after previously denying any involvement. The court also ordered that the three Pakistanis co-conspirators, who were sentenced to life in prison for their part in Pearl's kidnapping and murder by beheading, should be freed. In a statement, Pearl's family called the decision "illegal and unfair" and said they would appeal. At her daily briefing, White House Press Secretary, Jen Psaki expressed outrage at the verdict and asked Pakistan to review all of its legal options, including possible extradition to the United States. The US Secretary of State, Antony Blinken issued a statement declaring that the "US is committed to securing justice for Daniel Pearl's family and holding terrorists accountable."

Two days later, the Pakistani government decided to formally join the Sindh High Court's review petition against the Supreme Court judgment on the acquittal of all accused persons involved in the abduction and murder of Daniel Pearl. The Pakistani government filed a move application for the constitution of a larger bench to hear the review petition.

On February 2, 2021, Pakistan's Supreme Court ordered Omar Saeed Sheikh (the alleged mastermind of Pearl's abduction and beheading) to be taken off death row after 18 years and moved to a so-called government safe house. Omar Saeed Sheikh is under guard and not allowed to leave said facility. However, Sheikh is permitted visits from his wife and children.

On March 8, 2021, authorities in Karachi sent Omar Saeed Sheikh (whose sentence was reduced to time served of 7 years for murdering Pearl) to a rest house within the premises of Kot Lakhpat Jail. He is expected to remain there while the rest of the appeal process plays out in the Supreme Court of Pakistan.

== Reported death of conspirator in Pearl's murder ==
On May 7–8, 2025, during the India–Pakistan military strikes, it was reported that Abdul Rauf Azhar, a Jaish-e-Mohammed commander and co-conspirator of Pearl's murder, was killed in an Indian missile strike in Bahawalpur, Pakistan. The strikes occurred in retaliation for the Pahalgam terrorist attack, which occurred on April 22, 2025.

== Legacy ==
A collection of Pearl's writings (At Home in the World) was published posthumously in 2002. The Wall Street Journal noted that these demonstrated his "extraordinary skill as a writer" and his "eye for quirky stories—many of which appeared in The Wall Street Journal's "middle column".

The Daniel Pearl Foundation was formed by Pearl's parents Ruth and Judea Pearl; other family and friends have joined to continue Pearl's mission. They intend to carry out the work in the spirit, style, and principles that shaped Pearl's work and character. Daniel Pearl World Music Days has been held worldwide since 2002, and has promoted over 1,500 concerts in over 60 countries.

Pearl's widow, Mariane Pearl, wrote the memoir A Mighty Heart, which tells the full story of Pearl's life. The book was adapted into a film starring Dan Futterman as Daniel Pearl, Angelina Jolie as Mariane Pearl, Irfan Khan, Adnan Siddiqui, Archie Panjabi, and Will Patton.

On September 1, 2003, a book titled Who Killed Daniel Pearl? was published, written by Bernard-Henri Lévy. The book, which Lévy characterized as an "investigative novel", was highly controversial because of its speculative conclusions about the killing, for its broad characterizations of Pakistan, and for the author's decision to engage in a fictionalization of Pearl's thoughts during the final moments of his life. Lévy was widely criticized for the book.

There were plans for a film adaptation of the book, to be directed by Tod Williams and star Josh Lucas, focusing on the last few days of Daniel Pearl's life. These plans did not come to fruition, however, HBO Films produced a 79-minute documentary titled The Journalist and the Jihadi: The Murder of Daniel Pearl. It premiered on HBO on October 10, 2006. The documentary chronicles Pearl's life and death, and features extensive interviews with his immediate family. It is narrated by Christiane Amanpour, and was nominated for two Emmy Awards.

Pearl's parents edited and published a collection of responses sent to them from around the globe, entitled I Am Jewish: Personal Reflections Inspired by the Last Words of Daniel Pearl. At one point in the video, Daniel Pearl said: "My father is Jewish, my mother is Jewish, I am Jewish", after which Pearl added a seemingly obscure detail, that a street in the Israeli city of Bnei Brak is named after his great-grandfather, who was one of the founders of the town. The family has written that this last detail authenticates Daniel's own voice and demonstrates his willingness to claim his identity. Judea Pearl has written that at first this statement surprised him, but he later understood it to be a reference to the town-building tradition of his family, in contrast with the destructive aims of his captors. Judea Pearl then enlarged upon the idea by inviting responses from artists, government leaders, authors, journalists, scientists, scholars, rabbis, and others. All wrote personal responses to what they thought upon hearing that these were Pearl's last words. Some responses were one sentence while others were several pages in length.

The book is organized by five themes: Identity; Heritage; Covenant, Chosenness, and Faith; Humanity and Ethnicity; Tikkun Olam (Repairing the World) and Justice. Contributors include Theodore Bikel, Alan Dershowitz, Kirk Douglas, Ruth Bader Ginsburg, Larry King, Amos Oz, Shimon Peres, Daniel Schorr, Elie Wiesel, Peter Yarrow, and A.B. Yehoshua.

In western Massachusetts, where Pearl had been a young journalist, his friend and former bandmate, Todd Mack, established a new nonprofit organization called Fodfest (later renamed Music in Common), to continue Pearl's legacy of "bridge building", Mack said.

== Posthumous recognition ==
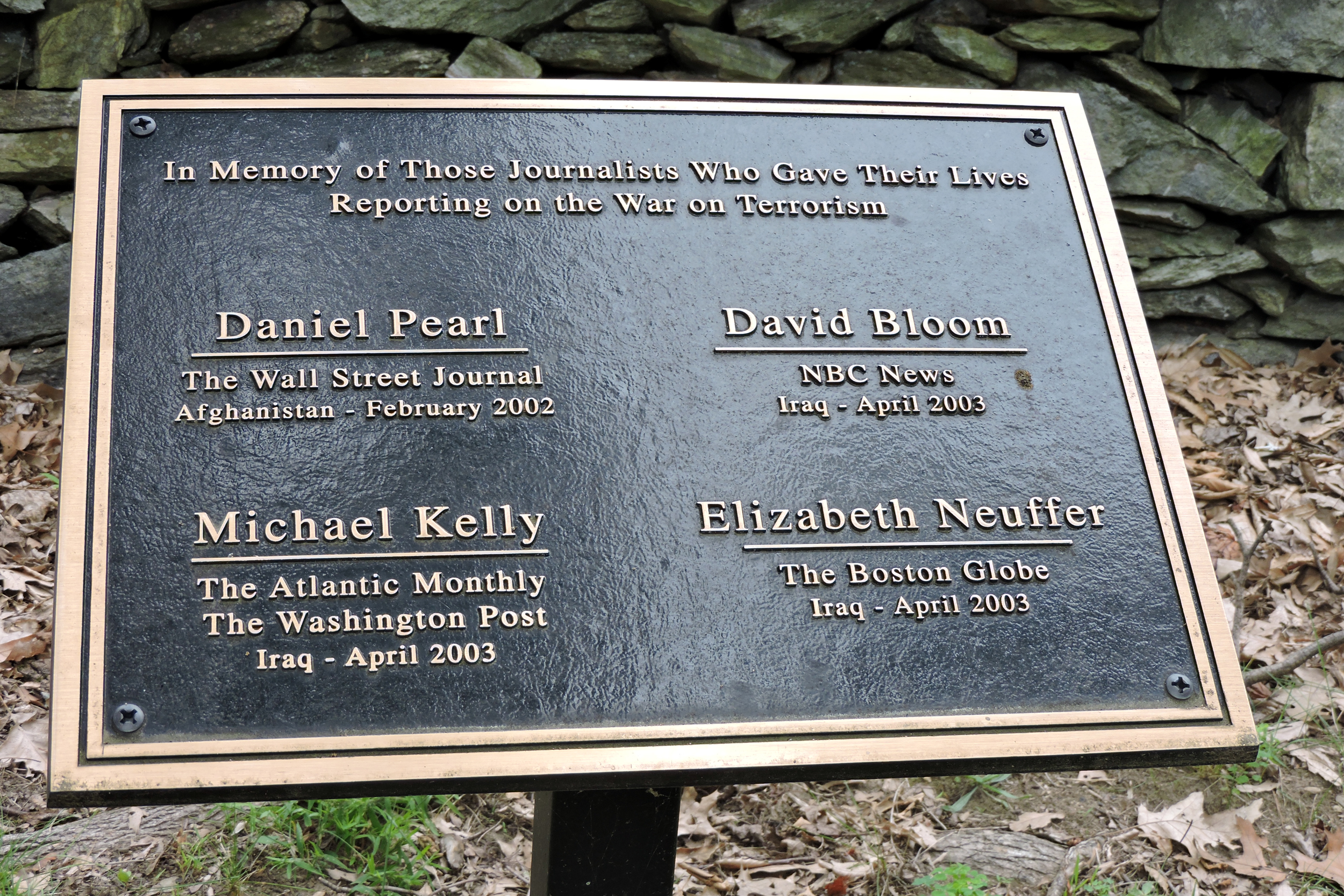
Plaque at National War Correspondents Memorial, Gathland State Park

In 2002, Pearl posthumously received the Elijah Parish Lovejoy Award from Colby College and in 2007, the Lyndon Baines Johnson Moral Courage Award from the Houston Holocaust Museum.

On April 16, 2007, Pearl was added to the Holocaust Memorial on Miami Beach as the first non-Holocaust victim. His father gave his consent for the induction in order to remind generations to come that "The forces of barbarity and evil are still active in our world. The Holocaust didn't finish in 1945." Journalist Bradley Burston criticized the addition of a post-Holocaust victim to the memorial, saying "it diminishes the uniqueness of the Holocaust".

In 2010, the International Press Institute named Pearl one of its World Press Freedom Heroes.

On December 10, 2007, President George W. Bush and Laura Bush invited Ruth and Judea Pearl, parents of Daniel Pearl, to the White House Hanukkah reception. They lighted the Pearl family menorah that once belonged to Daniel's great-grandparents, Chaim and Rosa Pearl, who brought it with them when they moved from Poland to Mandatory Palestine in 1924. There they helped establish the town of Bnei Brak.

Former mayor of New York City Ed Koch requested that his own tombstone be inscribed with Pearl's words: "My father is Jewish, my mother is Jewish, I am Jewish."

=== Films ===
The Journalist and the Jihadi: The Murder of Daniel Pearl (2006) a television documentary by Indian directors Ahmed Alauddin Jamal and Ramesh Sharma which aired on HBO compares the contrasting lives of Sheikh and Daniel Pearl. In 2007, the film A Mighty Heart was released, based on Mariane Pearl's memoir of the same name. Omerta, an Indian biographical film based on the life of Sheikh, was released in 2017 and received positive reviews.

=== Music ===
American minimalist composer Steve Reich wrote his 2006 work Daniel Variations, jointly commissioned by the Daniel Pearl Foundation and the Barbican Centre, which interweaves Pearl's own words with verses from the Book of Daniel.

=== Institutions and awards in Pearl's name ===
Shortly after Pearl's death, his parents founded the Daniel Pearl Foundation. The foundation's mission is to promote cross-cultural understanding through journalism, music, and dialogue. The honorary board of the Daniel Pearl Foundation includes Christiane Amanpour, former US President Bill Clinton, Abdul Sattar Edhi, John L. Hennessy, Ted Koppel, Queen Noor of Jordan, Sari Nusseibeh, Mariane Pearl, Itzhak Perlman, and Elie Wiesel.

The Daniel Pearl Memorial Lecture at UCLA was established by the foundation in 2002. Christopher Hitchens delivered a lecture on March 3, 2010. Other lecturers have included Anderson Cooper, David Brooks, Ted Koppel, Larry King, Jeff Greenfield, Daniel Schorr, and Thomas Friedman. Soka University of America's student news magazine, titled the Pearl, is named in honor of Daniel Pearl. The 2021 Daniel Pearl Memorial Lecture was given on February 2, 2021, by CNN's lead Washington correspondent Jake Tapper.

On May 19, 2010, U.S. President Barack Obama signed the Daniel Pearl Freedom of the Press Act, which protects U.S. journalists around the world. The act is also designed to use tools from the Secretary of State to ensure that freedom of press is upheld in other countries.

In 2010, Moment established The Daniel Pearl Investigative Journalism Initiative to provide grants and mentors for independent journalists to conduct in-depth reporting on anti-Semitism and other prejudices. The edited stories are published in Moment. The project has already produced two stories that have been nominated for the prestigious Livingston Award—the equivalent of the Pulitzer for journalists under 35.

Institutions named after Pearl

- The Sammy Ofer School of Communications at IDC Herzliya introduced the Daniel Pearl International Journalism Institute, a new partnership between IDC Herzliya and the Daniel Pearl Foundation. The multimedia newsroom at the School of Communications was named in honor of Daniel Pearl.
- The Charles E. Smith Jewish Day School in Rockville, MD has named their gymnasium after Pearl, with a large block sign reading Daniel Pearl Memorial Gymnasium. The school annually celebrates a Daniel Pearl Day.

Awards

- In 2005, The Wall Street Journal, in conjunction with the École de Journalisme de Sciences Po, gave the first Daniel Pearl Prize to Louis-Étienne Vigneault-Dubois from Canada, at a ceremony held on June 10 in Paris.
- In western Massachusetts, with help from the newspapers there for which Pearl worked early in his career (the North Adams Transcript and the Berkshire Eagle), friends of Pearl established the Daniel Pearl Berkshire Scholarship, awarded annually beginning in 2003.
- Since 2003, Stanford's Department of Communication has awarded a paid summer internship with The Wall Street Journal, known as the "Daniel Pearl Journalism Internship".
- In 2008 the International Consortium of Investigative Journalists' bi-annual ICIJ awards were renamed the Daniel Pearl Awards for Outstanding International Investigative Reporting.
- The Samuel Eells Literary and Educational Foundation annually awards the Brother Daniel Pearl Stanford 85' Award for Literary Excellence to one undergraduate member of the Alpha Delta Phi Society or Fraternity who has displayed exceptional skill and enthusiasm in fiction, non-fiction, poetry, music and lyrics, photography, or film.

Schools named after Pearl

- In May 2007, the Communications Technology Magnet School at Birmingham High School in Los Angeles was renamed the Daniel Pearl Magnet High School. In July 2009, it became a stand-alone high school in the Los Angeles Unified School District.
- In East Brunswick Township, Temple B'nai Shalom renamed their Hebrew School 'The Daniel Pearl Education Center' after Pearl. Additionally, the Synagogue has created a "Daniel Pearl Education Scholarship".

== See also ==
- 2006 Fox journalists kidnapping
- History of the Jews in Los Angeles
- Islamic terrorism
- List of kidnappings (2000–2009)
- List of solved missing person cases (2000s)
- List of unsolved murders (2000–present)

=== People involved in similar kidnappings/murders ===
- Eugene Armstrong
- Nick Berg
- Kenneth Bigley
- Amjad Hussain Farooqi
- James Foley
- Jack Hensley
- Margaret Hassan
- Paul Marshall Johnson Jr.
- Seif Adnan Kanaan
- Shosei Koda
- Yevgeny Rodionov
- Piotr Stańczak
- Kim Sun-il
- Austin Tice

== Sources ==
- Burger, Timothy J (February 22, 2002). "Kidnappers Cut Pearl's Throat Videotape Shows Newsman's Brutal Slaying". Daily News (New York). Daily News, L.P. p. 3. – 'Fahad Naseem, one of the three militants accused of kidnapping Pearl, told a judge in Karachi yesterday that Pearl was kidnapped because he was "a Jew and is working against Islam."'
- Masood, Salman; Talat Hussain (May 29, 2004). "Suspect in Reporter's Death Is Wanted in Attacks on Musharraf". The New York Times. p. Section A; Column 3; Foreign Desk; Pg. 2. – 'The intelligence official, who spoke on condition of anonymity, said that information from American intelligence agencies helped Pakistani investigators track down the ring involved in the plot. Information from Khalid Shaikh Mohammed, Al Qaeda's former head of operations who was captured in March 2002, aided the investigation, he said. American officials say they believe that Mr. Mohammed was the person who actually killed Mr. Pearl.'
- Popham, Peter (February 23, 2002). "Video Reveals the Hideous Sacrifice of Captive Reporter; Pearl murder gruesome tape shows American speaking into camera as unknown killer slits his throat, then beheads him". The Independent. Newspaper Publishing PLC. p. 2.
