= A Mighty Heart =

Book by Mariane Pearl

- Cover of A Mighty Heart
- Author: Mariane Pearl
- Original title: A Mighty Heart: The Brave Life and Death of My Husband Daniel Pearl
- Language: English
- Published: 2003

A Mighty Heart: The Brave Life and Death of My Husband Daniel Pearl (also subtitled A Mighty Heart: The Inside Story of the Al Qaeda Kidnapping of Danny Pearl) (2003) is a memoir by Mariane Pearl, a freelance French journalist. She covers the 2002 kidnapping and murder by terrorists in Pakistan of her late husband Daniel Pearl, an American journalist with The Wall Street Journal.

== Reception ==
The book was reviewed by, among others, The Christian Science Monitor, the Chicago Sun-Times, The Spectator and The New York Review of Books.

== Adaptations ==
A Mighty Heart was adapted as a dramatic 2007 film of the same name, starring Angelina Jolie as Mariane Pearl, Dan Futterman as Daniel Pearl and Archie Panjabi as their friend and colleague Asra Nomani. The movie also covers efforts by the US Department of Justice, the U.S. Department of State's Diplomatic Security Service (DSS) and Pakistan's Inter-Services Intelligence to track the kidnappers and bring them to justice.
