= Mariane Pearl =

French journalist

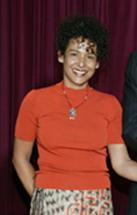
- Mariane Pearl in 2003
- Born: Mariane van Neyenhoff; 23 July 1967 (age 59); Clichy, Hauts-de-Seine, France
- Occupation: Journalist
- Employer: Glamour
- Spouse: Daniel Pearl (m. 1999; died 2002)
- Children: 1

Mariane van Neyenhoff Pearl (born 23 July 1967) is a French freelance journalist and a former reporter and columnist for Glamour magazine. She is the widow of Daniel Pearl, an American journalist who was the South Asia Bureau Chief for The Wall Street Journal, who was kidnapped and murdered by terrorists in Pakistan in early 2002, during the early months of the United States' war on terror. Pearl published a memoir, A Mighty Heart (2003), about her husband and his life. It was adapted as a film of the same name, released in 2007.

== Life and career ==
Mariane van Neyenhoff was born in Clichy, Hauts-de-Seine, France, to a Cuban mother of Afro-Cuban and Chinese Cuban descent and a Dutch Jewish father. Her paternal grandfather was a diamond merchant in the Netherlands. Mariane and her brother Satchi Van Neyenhoff were raised in Paris, where they both started their careers. Satchi Van Neyenhoff became a sound editor.

Van Neyenhoff started in journalism as a reporter for international Glamour magazine. In addition, she had a column with the magazine, known as the Global Diary Column. She explored aspects of globalization as seen through fashion and its business elements.

Van Neyenhoff met American journalist Daniel Pearl in 1999, while he was on assignment in Paris.

They married in August 1999 in Paris. After Pearl was promoted to South Asia Bureau Chief for The Wall Street Journal, they lived for a time in Mumbai, India. She also traveled with him to Karachi, Pakistan, to cover aspects of the United States' war on terrorism. In 2002, he was kidnapped after meeting a source for dinner. Pakistani militants announced the abduction. They murdered Daniel Pearl by beheading on 1 February 2002. Adam Daniel Pearl, the son of Daniel and Mariane, was born in Paris four months after his father had been murdered. Mariane Pearl is a practising Nichiren Buddhist and a member of Soka Gakkai International.

Mariane Pearl's memoir, A Mighty Heart, deals with the events surrounding her husband's kidnapping and murder by Pakistani militants in 2002. United States and Pakistani agencies made efforts to capture his killers and bring them to justice.

In July 2002, Ahmed Omar Saeed Sheikh, a British national of Pakistani origin, was sentenced in Pakistan to death by hanging for Pearl's abduction and murder. His sentence was commuted to life in jail. Three other men were convicted of their roles in the journalist's murder.

== Adaptation of memoir ==
Her book was adapted for the 2007 film of the same name. It was co-produced by Brad Pitt, Andrew Eaton and Dede Gardner and directed by Michael Winterbottom. The film stars Angelina Jolie and Dan Futterman as Mariane and Daniel Pearl.

== Daniel Pearl Foundation ==
Pearl is a member of the honorary board of the Daniel Pearl Foundation which was established by Daniel's parents Ruth and Judea Pearl. Honorary board members have included international correspondent Christiane Amanpour; former US President Bill Clinton; Pakistani philanthropist Abdul Sattar Edhi; former president of Stanford University John L. Hennessy; Nightline anchorman Ted Koppel; Queen Noor of Jordan; Palestinian professor and president of Al-Quds University Sari Nusseibeh; violinist Itzhak Perlman; author Elie Wiesel and others.

== Lawsuit ==
In July 2007, following the trials in Pakistan and revelations by Al-Qaeda terrorists held by the United States of participation in Daniel Pearl's abduction and murder, Mariane Pearl filed suit in the United States District Court for the Eastern District of New York against a dozen named terrorists and a bank that may have financed them; she was seeking damages for their alleged roles in the abduction, torture, and murder of her husband. Those named in the suit include Ahmed Omar Saeed Sheikh, already convicted of murder and sentenced to death; Khalid Sheikh Mohammed, being held by the US at Guantanamo Bay; and Habib Bank of Pakistan. On 24 October 2007, her attorneys dropped the lawsuit.

Lawyers for Mariane Pearl noted that Habib Bank Limited and the other defendants in the case had not responded to the lawsuit filed in July (although Habib Bank Limited had denied ever supporting terrorism). They did not explain their reason for dropping the action. A spokesman has stated that the withdrawal was for personal reasons on the part of Pearl and should have no bearing on the merits of the lawsuit.

== Recognition ==
She was recognized as one of the BBC's 100 women of 2013.

== Book ==
- A Mighty Heart. Mariane Pearl and Sarah Crichton. New York: Scribner, 2003. ISBN 0-7432-4442-7, ISBN 978-0-7432-4442-8.

== Filmography ==
- Tout le monde en parle (2003)
- The Robert MacNeil Report (2002)
- American Morning (2002)
- A Mighty Heart (2007)
