= Ruth Pearl =

Israeli-American software developer (1935–2021)

- רות פרל
- Born: Eveline Rejwan; November 11, 1935; Baghdad, Kingdom of Iraq
- Died: July 20, 2021 (aged 85); Los Angeles, California, U.S.
- Education: Technion; New Jersey Institute of Technology; Polytechnic Institute of Brooklyn
- Spouse: Judea Pearl (m. 1960)
- Children: 3 (including Daniel)

Ruth Pearl (Hebrew: רות פרל; born Eveline Rejwan; November 11, 1935 – July 20, 2021) was an Israeli-American software developer. She was the mother of Wall Street Journal journalist Daniel Pearl, who was murdered by Muslim extremists connected to Al-Qaeda in 2002.

== Early life and career ==
Pearl was born Eveline Rejwan on November 11, 1935, in Baghdad, Iraq. Her father, Joseph, was a tailor who ran an import business, and her mother, Victoria (Abada) Rejwan, was a homemaker. She had four siblings: two older brothers and two younger sisters. When Pearl was 5, she lived through the Farhud, an outbreak of anti-Jewish violence in Iraq following a failed nationalist coup. She and her family hid in their home for days, protected by their Arab neighbors who told rioters that no Jews lived there.

Her family then moved to a suburb of Baghdad but anti-Jewish attacks persisted and she herself witnessed the bodies of Iraqi Jews hanging from gallows in a square. Her father lost vision in one eye after an assault and he had to bribe a police officer to free his two sons after they were arrested on false charges.

In the late 1940s, Pearl worked with an underground Zionist movement that facilitated the emigration of Jews, then illegal, to British-controlled Mandatory Palestine. At this time, Pearl began using the Hebrew name Ruth. Around 1948, her two older brothers were smuggled into Palestine from Iraq. In 1949, Ruth's oldest brother was killed fighting for the Israeli army, which she did not learn about until years later as her father had withheld the information from his family. In 1951, Pearl arrived with her family in Israel as part of the mass exodus of Iraqi Jews.

== Education ==
Pearl entered the Israeli Navy in 1955. Recognizing her skill in mathematics, the Navy assigned her to teach trigonometry to officer candidates. She went on to study at the Technion – Israel Institute of Technology, where she earned a degree in electrical engineering as one of four women in a class of 120. While at Technion, she met Judea Pearl and, in 1960, they married and moved to the United States for graduate studies. She earned a master’s degree in electrical engineering from the Newark College of Engineering (now known as the New Jersey Institute of Technology).

== Later life ==
After the kidnapping and murder of her son Daniel in 2002, Pearl and her family started the nonprofit Daniel Pearl Foundation to continue Daniel’s legacy and values. The organization seeks to promote tolerance, combat hatred, and nurture cross-cultural understanding, particularly through journalism, music and dialogue, three of Daniel’s passions in life.

Pearl served in multiple executive roles with the Daniel Pearl Foundation, effectively managing it as CEO. She helped establish and guide numerous programs, including Daniel Pearl Journalism Fellowships, which bring mid-career journalists from Muslim-dominated countries to work at U.S.-based news organizations. She also oversaw Daniel Pearl World Music Days, an annual celebration of global concerts dedicated to using music as a bridge between cultures. Through these programs and others, she hoped to combat hatred and violence by connecting people through their common humanity.
