= Changeling (disambiguation) =

A changeling is a figure in West European folklore.

Changeling, The Changeling, or The Changelings may also refer to:

== Books ==
- The Changeling, a 1996 novel by Kristine Kathryn Rusch
- The Changelings (novel), 1955, by Jo Sinclair
- The Changeling (Ōe novel), 2000
- The Changeling (play), 1622, by Thomas Middleton and William Rowley
- The Changeling (LaValle novel), a 2017 novel by Victor LaValle
- The Changeling (Snyder novel), 1970
- The Changeling (Sean Williams novel), 2008
- The Changeling (Joy Williams novel), 1978
- Changeling (Mike Oldfield autobiography)
- Changeling (novel), 1980, by Roger Zelazny
- The Changelings: A Classical Japanese Court Tale or Torikaebaya Monogatari
- Animorphs or The Changelings, a young adult book series by K. A. Applegate
- The Changeling, an 1898 novel by Sir Walter Besant
- Troll och Människor, a two-part collection of writings (1915, 1921) by Selma Lagerlöf; translated as The Changeling by Susanna Stevens, 1992
- The Changeling, a 1942–1944 serialized science fiction novel by A. E. van Vogt
- The Changeling, a 1944 novel by Eden Phillpotts
- The Changeling, a 1958 novel by Robin Jenkins
- The Changeling, a 1961 novel by William Mayne
- The Changeling, a 1974 novel by Rosemary Sutcliff
- The Changeling, a 1989 novel by Phillippa Carr, the 15th book of her fiction series Daughters of England
- Changeling, a 1989 novel by Stephen Leigh in the Isaac Asimov's Robots and Aliens series
- The Changeling, a 1995 novel by Terri Windling
- The Changeling, a 1996 novel by Alison MacLeod
- Changeling, a 2006 novel by Delia Sherman
- Changeling, a novel by Steve Feasey, shortlisted for the 2009 Waterstones Children's Book Prize
- Changeling, a novel by Philippa Gregory
- The Changeling, a 1968 short story by Gene Wolfe

=== Comics ===
- Changeling (Marvel Comics character), a character in Marvel Comics
- Changeling (DC Comics), a DC Comics character later known as Beast Boy
- Changeling, a manga by Shio Satō

== Film and television ==
- Changeling (film), a 2008 American drama
  - Changeling (soundtrack), soundtrack album based on the film
- "The Changeling" (Play of the Month), a 1974 British production of the 1622 Middleton & Rowley play
- The Changeling (TV series), a 2023 Apple TV+ horror fantasy television series
- The Changeling (film), a 1980 Canadian horror film
- "The Changeling" (Star Trek: The Original Series), a 1967 television episode
- Changeling (Star Trek), a fictional race of shapeshifters
- Changelings, a reformed villain species from My Little Pony: Friendship Is Magic
- "The Changeling" (Stargate SG-1), a television episode
- "Changelings" (Once Upon a Time), a television episode
- "The Changeling", a season 7 episode of The Waltons
- Changelings, a proposed TV series based on the Tara Bray Smith novel Betwixt
- "The Changeling", an episode in series 3 of the BBC series Merlin

== Gaming ==
- Changeling: The Dreaming, a role-playing game published in the 1990s
- Changeling: The Lost, a role-playing game published in 2007
- Changeling (Dungeons & Dragons), a player character race

== Music ==
- Changeling (album), 2012, by Camille O'Sullivan
- The Changeling (album), 1982, by Toyah
- "Changeling" (song), a 2013 song by Alison Moyet
- "The Changeling" (song), a 1971 song by the Doors
- "Changeling", a song by DJ Shadow from Endtroducing.....
- "Changeling", a song by Madder Mortem from Desiderata
- "Changeling", a song by Simple Minds from Real to Real Cacophony

== Plays ==
- The Changelings (1923) by Lee Wilson Dodd

== See also ==
- Changling (disambiguation)
- Shapeshifting, mythical ability of a being or creature to transform its physical form or shape
