= 35th Saturn Awards =

US film and television award ceremony

- Date: June 25, 2009
- Site: Burbank, California, U.S.

Highlights
- Most awards: The Dark Knight (5)
- Most nominations: The Dark Knight (12)

The 35th Saturn Awards, honoring the best in science fiction, fantasy and horror film and television in 2008 were presented on June 25, 2009, in Burbank, California.

Below is a complete list of nominees and winners. Winners are highlighted in boldface.

== Winners and nominees ==
=== Film ===
Best Science Fiction Film	Best Fantasy Film
**Iron Man**; The Day the Earth Stood Still; Eagle Eye; The Incredible Hulk; Indiana Jones and the Kingdom of the Crystal Skull; Jumper	**The Curious Case of Benjamin Button**; The Chronicles of Narnia: Prince Caspian; Hancock; The Spiderwick Chronicles; Twilight; Wanted
Best Horror Film	Best Action or Adventure Film
**Hellboy II: The Golden Army**; The Happening; The Mummy: Tomb of the Dragon Emperor; Quarantine; Splinter; The Strangers	**The Dark Knight**; Changeling; Gran Torino; Quantum of Solace; Traitor; Valkyrie
Best Animated Film	Best International Film
**WALL-E**; Bolt; Horton Hears a Who!; Kung Fu Panda; Madagascar: Escape 2 Africa; Star Wars: The Clone Wars	**Let the Right One In**; The Bank Job; The Forbidden Kingdom; In Bruges; Slumdog Millionaire; Transsiberian
Best Actor	Best Actress
**Robert Downey Jr. – Iron Man as Tony Stark / Iron Man**; Christian Bale – The Dark Knight as Bruce Wayne / Batman; Tom Cruise – Valkyrie as Claus von Stauffenberg; Harrison Ford – Indiana Jones and the Kingdom of the Crystal Skull as Indiana Jones; Brad Pitt – The Curious Case of Benjamin Button as Benjamin Button; Will Smith – Hancock as John Hancock	**Angelina Jolie – Changeling as Christine Collins**; Cate Blanchett – The Curious Case of Benjamin Button as Daisy Fuller; Maggie Gyllenhaal – The Dark Knight as Rachel Dawes; Julianne Moore – Blindness as the Doctor's Wife; Emily Mortimer – Transsiberian as Jessie; Gwyneth Paltrow – Iron Man as Virginia "Pepper" Potts
Best Supporting Actor	Best Supporting Actress
**Heath Ledger – The Dark Knight as The Joker**; Jeff Bridges – Iron Man as Obadiah Stane; Aaron Eckhart – The Dark Knight as Harvey Dent / Two-Face; Woody Harrelson – Transsiberian as Roy; Shia LaBeouf – Indiana Jones and the Kingdom of the Crystal Skull as Mutt Jones; Bill Nighy – Valkyrie as Friedrich Olbricht	**Tilda Swinton – The Curious Case of Benjamin Button as Elizabeth Abbott**; Joan Allen – Death Race as Claire Hennessy; Judi Dench – Quantum of Solace as M; Olga Kurylenko – Quantum of Solace as Camille Montes; Charlize Theron – Hancock as Mary; Carice van Houten – Valkyrie as Nina von Stauffenberg
Best Performance by a Younger Actor	Best Director
**Jaden Smith – The Day the Earth Stood Still as Jacob Benson**; Freddie Highmore – The Spiderwick Chronicles as Jared Grace; Lina Leandersson – Let the Right One In as Eli; Dev Patel – Slumdog Millionaire as Jamal Malik; Catinca Untaru – The Fall as Alexandria; Brandon Walters – Australia as Nullah	**Jon Favreau – Iron Man**; Clint Eastwood – Changeling; David Fincher – The Curious Case of Benjamin Button; Christopher Nolan – The Dark Knight; Bryan Singer – Valkyrie; Steven Spielberg – Indiana Jones and the Kingdom of the Crystal Skull; Andrew Stanton – WALL-E
Best Writing	Best Music
**Christopher Nolan, Jonathan Nolan – The Dark Knight**; Mark Fergus and Hawk Ostby, Art Marcum and Matt Holloway – Iron Man; John Ajvide Lindqvist – Let the Right One In; David Koepp, John Kamps – Ghost Town; Eric Roth – The Curious Case of Benjamin Button; J. Michael Straczynski – Changeling	**Hans Zimmer, James Newton Howard – The Dark Knight**; Alexandre Desplat – The Curious Case of Benjamin Button; Ramin Djawadi – Iron Man; Clint Eastwood – Changeling; John Ottman – Valkyrie; John Powell – Jumper
Best Costume	Best Make-Up
**Mary Zophres – Indiana Jones and the Kingdom of the Crystal Skull**; Lindy Hemming – The Dark Knight; Deborah Hopper – Changeling; Joanna Johnston – Valkyrie; Catherine Martin – Australia; Isis Mussenden – The Chronicles of Narnia: Prince Caspian	**Greg Cannom – The Curious Case of Benjamin Button**; John Caglione Jr., Conor O'Sullivan – The Dark Knight; Mike Elizalde – Hellboy II: The Golden Army; Paul Hyett – Doomsday; Greg Nicotero, Paul Engelen – The Chronicles of Narnia: Prince Caspian; Gerald Quist – Tropic Thunder
Best Special Effects
**Nick Davis, Chris Corbould, Tim Webber, Paul J. Franklin – The Dark Knight**; Eric Barba, Steve Preeg, Burt Dalton, Craig Barron – The Curious Case of Benjamin Button; Pablo Helman, Daniel Sudick – Indiana Jones and the Kingdom of the Crystal Skull; John Nelson, Ben Snow, Daniel Sudick, Shane Mahan – Iron Man; Mike Wassel, Adrian De Wet, Andrew Chapman, Eamonn Butler – Hellboy II: The Golden Army; Dean Wright, Wendy Rogers – The Chronicles of Narnia: Prince Caspian

=== Television ===
==== Programs ====
Best Network Television Series	Best Syndicated/Cable Television Series
**Lost (ABC)**; Fringe (Fox); Heroes (NBC); Life on Mars (ABC); Supernatural (The CW); Terminator: The Sarah Connor Chronicles (Fox)	**Battlestar Galactica (Sci-Fi)**; The Closer (TNT); Dexter (Showtime); Leverage (TNT); Star Wars: The Clone Wars (Cartoon Network); True Blood (HBO)
Best Television Presentation
**The Librarian: Curse of the Judas Chalice (TNT)**; The Andromeda Strain (A&E); Breaking Bad (AMC); Jericho (CBS); The Last Templar (NBC); 24: Redemption (Fox)

==== Acting ====
Best Actor on Television	Best Actress on Television
**Edward James Olmos – Battlestar Galactica as William Adama (Sci-Fi)**; Bryan Cranston – Breaking Bad (AMC) as Walter White; Matthew Fox – Lost (ABC) as Jack Shephard; Michael C. Hall – Dexter (Showtime) as Dexter Morgan; Timothy Hutton – Leverage (TNT) as Nathan Ford; Noah Wyle – The Librarian: Curse of the Judas Chalice (TNT) as Flynn Carsen	**Mary McDonnell – Battlestar Galactica (Sci-Fi) as Laura Roslin**; Lena Headey – Terminator: The Sarah Connor Chronicles (Fox) as Sarah Connor; Jennifer Love Hewitt – Ghost Whisperer (CBS) as Melinda Gordon; Evangeline Lilly – Lost (ABC) as Kate Austen; Anna Paquin – True Blood (HBO) as Sookie Stackhouse; Kyra Sedgwick – The Closer (TNT) as Brenda Leigh Johnson; Anna Torv – Fringe (Fox) as Olivia Dunham
Best Supporting Actor on Television	Best Supporting Actress on Television
**Adrian Pasdar – Heroes (NBC) as Nathan Petrelli**; Henry Ian Cusick – Lost (ABC) as Desmond Hume; Thomas Dekker – Terminator: The Sarah Connor Chronicles as John Connor; Michael Emerson – Lost (ABC) as Ben Linus; Josh Holloway – Lost (ABC) as James "Sawyer" Ford; Milo Ventimiglia – Heroes (NBC) as Peter Petrelli	**Jennifer Carpenter – Dexter (Showtime) as Debra Morgan**; Summer Glau – Terminator: The Sarah Connor Chronicles (Fox) as Cameron; Yunjin Kim – Lost (ABC) as Sun-Hwa Kwon; Elizabeth Mitchell – Lost (ABC) as Juliet Burke; Hayden Panettiere – Heroes (NBC) as Claire Bennet; Katee Sackhoff – Battlestar Galactica (Sci-Fi) as Kara Thrace
Best Guest Performer on Television
**Jimmy Smits – Dexter (Showtime) as ADA Miguel Prado**; Kristen Bell – Heroes (NBC) as Elle Bishop; Alan Dale – Lost (ABC) as Charles Widmore; Kevin Durand – Lost (ABC) as Martin Keamy; Robert Forster – Heroes (NBC) as Arthur Petrelli; Sonya Walger – Lost (ABC) as Penny Widmore

=== DVD ===
Best DVD Release	Best Special Edition DVD Release
**Jack Brooks: Monster Slayer**; Cold Prey; The Deaths of Ian Stone; Resident Evil: Degeneration; Starship Troopers 3: Marauder; Stuck	**Stephen King's The Mist: Two-Disc Collector's Edition**; Brotherhood of the Wolf: Director's Cut; Dark City: The Director's Cut; The Dark Knight: Two-Disc Special Edition; L.A. Confidential: Two-Disc Special Edition; Zodiac: The Director's Cut
Best Classic Film Release	Best DVD Movie Collection
**Psycho - Universal Legacy Series**; Casablanca - Ultimate Collector's Edition; Heathers - 20th High School Reunion Edition; The Nightmare Before Christmas; The Picture of Dorian Gray; Sleeping Beauty	**The Godfather: The Coppola Restoration**; Abbott & Costello: The Complete Universal Series Collection; Dirty Harry: The Ultimate Collector's Edition; Ghost House Underground Eight Film Collection; Mystery Science Theater 3000 20th Anniversary Edition; Planet of the Apes 40th Anniversary Collection (Blu-ray)
Best DVD Television Release	Best Retro Television Series on DVD
**Moonlight: The Complete Series**; Doctor Who: The Complete Fourth Series; Heroes: Season 2; Lost: The Complete Fourth Season; Reaper: Season One; Torchwood: Season 2; The Tudors: The Complete Second Season	**The Invaders: The First & Second Seasons**; Columbo: Mystery Movie Collection 1990; Early Edition: Season One; The Incredible Hulk: The Complete Series; Mission: Impossible - The Fourth & Fifth Seasons; Spaced: The Complete Series

== Special awards ==
=== Visionary Award ===
- Jeffrey Katzenberg for advancing 3D film presentation.

=== Life Career Award ===
- Lance Henriksen

=== Lifetime Achievement Award ===
- Leonard Nimoy
