= Hereafter (soundtrack) =

Hereafter (Original Motion Picture Score)

Film score by Clint Eastwood
- Released: October 19, 2010
- Studio: Eastwood Scoring Stage, Warner Bros. Studios, Burbank, California
- Genre: Film score
- Length: 33:16
- Label: WaterTower Music
- Producer: Clint Eastwood

Clint Eastwood chronology
Changeling (2008)	Hereafter (2010)	J. Edgar (2011)

Hereafter (Original Motion Picture Score) is the film score to the 2010 film Hereafter directed, produced and scored by Clint Eastwood, starring Matt Damon and Cécile de France. The score was released under the WaterTower Music label on October 19, 2010.

== Background ==
Clint Eastwood composed the film score, after previously doing the same for his directorials since Mystic River (2003), with the exception of Letters from Iwo Jima (2006), Gran Torino (2008) and Invictus (2009). It was recorded at the Eastwood Scoring Stage at Warner Bros. Studios Burbank conducted by Ashley Irwin and Gennady Loktinov. Some of the score had elements incorporated from Sergei Rachmaninoff. WaterTower Music released the score album on October 19, 2010.

== Reception ==
Filmtracks considered the score to be "melodic". Kirk Honeycutt of The Hollywood Reporter called "Eastwood's lilting musical score is among his best". David Edelstein of NPR wrote "The solemn guitar-heavy score Eastwood wrote doesn't liven things up." Justin Chang of Variety wrote "Eastwood's score is a tad overinsistent if melodically spare, its few notes reiterated on various instruments (including piano, guitar and harmonica), and supplemented here by snippets of Rachmaninoff." A reviewer based at WNBC wrote "The score is hard to take, as the each drag of the violin's bow is like a whack over the head telling you, 'feell sad'. It's not that the music is bad, but in a film this quiet, still and low-key, it is so often the dominant sensory input. It's too much." Peter Rainer of The Christian Science Monitor wrote "Eastwood, who also wrote the simple score, inexplicably lays in (uncredited) wayward snatches from Rachmaninoff – specifically, the second piano concerto that did such yeoman work in Brief Encounter (1954)."

== Accolades ==
Hereafter's original score was shortlisted as one among the 77 contenders for the Academy Award for Best Original Score category at the 83rd Academy Awards but was not nominated. It was then nominated at the 37th Saturn Awards for Best Music losing to Hans Zimmer for Inception (2010).

== Track listing ==
No.	Title	Length
1.	"Beginning Credits"	0:43
2.	"Tsunami"	1:15
3.	"Embrace"	0:52
4.	"Jason Dies"	0:39
5.	"Marie Back Home"	0:53
6.	"Sad George"	0:15
7.	"Jason's Ashes"	1:06
8.	"Mom Leaves"	1:15
9.	"Talk of the Hereafter"	2:07
10.	"George Watches Her Go"	0:31
11.	"Two Beds"	0:58
12.	"Bonjour"	0:48
13.	"Marie's Research"	0:56
14.	"Without A Partner"	0:47
15.	"Multiple Attempts"	1:57
16.	"Hat Chase"	0:49
17.	"Used to Be Happy"	3:18
18.	"George Eats Alone"	0:21
19.	"George's Letter"	0:45
20.	"Book Signing"	1:00
21.	"Marcus Waits"	0:56
22.	"Marcus Goes Home"	1:18
23.	"A Letter To Marie"	1:14
24.	"Marie And George"	2:09
25.	"End Credits"	6:24
Total length:		33:16

== Personnel ==
Credits adapted from liner notes:

- Music composer and producer – Clint Eastwood
- Music arrangements – Gennady Loktionov
- Recording and mixing – Robert Fernandez
- Music editor – Chris McGeary
- Art direction – Sandeep Sriram
- Executive producer – Jason Linn
- Management – Paul Broucek

Orchestra and musicians

- Conductor – Gennady Loktionov, Ashley Irwin
- Orchestrator – Ashley Irwin
- Bass – Frances Liu Wu, Mike Valerio
- Cello – Armen Ksajikian, Dennis Karmazyn, Tim Landauer, Timothy Loo
- Piano – Gennady Loktionov
- Viola – Andrew Duckles, Karen Elaine, Robert Brophy, Suzanna Giordano
- Violin – Alyssa Park, Bruce Dukov, Charlie Bisharat, Jenny Leem, Katia Popov, Mario DeLeon, Phillip Levy, Sara Parkins, Sid Page, Tamara Hatwan, Tereza Stanislav, Yelena Yegoryan
