= Changeling (comics) =

Changeling, in comics, may refer to:

- Beast Boy, a superhero appearing in DC Comics who used the codename "Changeling" for a period during his membership in the Teen Titans
- Kevin Sidney, a supervillain using the alter ego of Changeling who later joined the X-Men

== See also ==
- Changeling (disambiguation)
