= Gordon Stewart Northcott =

Canadian serial killer (1906–1930)

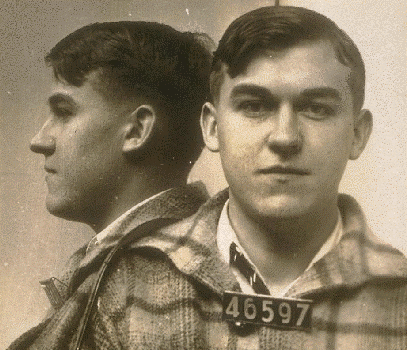
- Northcott in 1928
- Born: November 9, 1906; Bladworth, Saskatchewan, Canada
- Died: October 2, 1930 (aged 23); San Quentin State Prison, California, U.S.
- Known for: Wineville Chicken Coop murders
- Status: Executed by hanging
- Conviction: First degree murder (3 counts) (February 8, 1929)
- Penalty: Death (February 13, 1929)

Details
- Victims: 3–20
- Span of crimes: 1926–1928
- State: California
- Date apprehended: September 19, 1928

Gordon Stewart Northcott (November 9, 1906 – October 2, 1930) was a Canadian serial killer, child rapist, and child abductor who was convicted of the murders of three young boys in California, U.S., and confessed to the murders of nine in total. He was executed on October 2, 1930.

== Biography ==
Gordon Stewart Northcott was born in Bladworth, Saskatchewan to Cyrus G. Northcott and Sarah Louise Northcott. He was raised in British Columbia. He had an early fondness for animals, particularly ducks and rabbits. His father later described Northcott as "an abnormal boy, both physically and mentally". Northcott's mother insisted that her son wore dresses and played with dolls until his mid-teens. He moved to Los Angeles with his parents in 1924.

Northcott asked his father to purchase a plot of land in Wineville, California. On this land, he built a chicken ranch and a house with the help of his father—who was in the construction business—and his nephew, Sanford Clark. It was under this pretext that Northcott brought Sanford from Canada to the United States.

Police and press commonly referred to Northcott as "Ape Man" in reports, due to both his father and nephew taking note of his excessive body hair.

== Wineville Chicken Coop murders ==
While residing at his chicken ranch, Northcott abducted an undetermined number of boys and sexually abused them. Typically, after abusing a victim, he would drive the boy home and let him go. However, he murdered some of them at the ranch.

The police in Canada arrested Northcott and his mother on September 19, 1928. Due to errors in the extradition paperwork, they were not returned to Los Angeles until November 30. Northcott was implicated in the murder of Walter Collins, but because Northcott's mother had confessed to murdering Collins and had been sentenced for it, the state chose not to prosecute Northcott in that murder.

It was speculated that Northcott may have killed as many as 20 boys, but the state of California could not produce evidence to support that allegation. Ultimately, the state only brought an indictment against Northcott for the murders of an unidentified underage Mexican national, later to be identified as Alvin Gothea—known as the "Headless Mexican"—and the brothers Lewis and Nelson Winslow (aged 12 and 10, respectively). The brothers had been reported missing from Pomona on May 16, 1928.

In early 1929, Northcott's trial was held before Judge George R. Freeman in Riverside County, California. The jury heard that he kidnapped, molested, tortured, and murdered the Winslow brothers and Alvin Gothea in 1928. On February 8, Northcott was convicted of those murders. On February 13, Freeman sentenced him to death.

Northcott was imprisoned at San Quentin State Prison on February 12, 1929. In September 1929, he suffered from appendicitis but refused medical intervention. He again suffered from appendicitis in May 1930 but again refused treatment. On June 26, 1930, the Supreme Court of California refused his appeal.

His last meal consisted of ham, eggs, biscuits, hot cakes and syrup, mush, and coffee. He was hanged at the prison on October 2, 1930. The rope failed to break Northcott's neck, resulting in it taking 13 minutes for him to die from strangulation.

== In popular culture ==
In 2008, Clint Eastwood directed the film Changeling, in which Northcott was portrayed by Jason Butler Harner.

== See also ==
- List of serial killers in the United States
- List of botched executions
