= Jo Sinclair =

American novelist

Ruth Seid (July 1, 1913 – April 4, 1995) was an American novelist who wrote under the pen name Jo Sinclair. She earned awards and critical praise for her novels about race relations and the struggles of immigrant families in America.

== Life ==
The fifth child and third daughter of Jewish immigrants, Ruth Seid was born in Brooklyn, New York on July 1, 1913, the daughter of Nathan Seid and his wife, Ida (Kravetsky). In an effort to escape the blinding poverty in which they lived, the Seid family moved to Cleveland, Ohio in 1916, but her parents were unable to find the prosperity they sought. After attending local public elementary schools, she enrolled at John Hay High School, where she concentrated on studies in English and journalism.

After graduating at age 17 as the class valedictorian, Seid found employment as a clerk-typist and began attending night classes at Cleveland College. With the onset of the Great Depression, she became unemployed, and she and her family sought public assistance.

Seid worked in a factory, for the Works Progress Administration (WPA) and served as assistant publicity director for the Cleveland American Red Cross; and she was an editor, secretary, and saleswoman.

Seid spent five years working for the WPA, writing, editing and doing historical research on areas of interest in Ohio. She eventually became an editor on the Foreign Language Newspaper Digest. The WPA was one of the most important accomplishments of the Emergency Relief Appropriation Act of 1935—part of President Franklin Delano Roosevelt's "New Deal." This government office hired unemployed Americans to work on various government projects. Many of these projects were similar to ones sponsored by the Public Works Administration.

== Writing ==
While employed by the WPA, she spent her free time developing her own projects, writing short stories and articles. In 1937, Seid, using the pseudonym of Jo Sinclair, sold her first story to Esquire, which appeared in the January 1938 issue.

That year proved to be a turning point for the struggling writer as she also placed stories and articles with New Masses, Ken, and Coronet. A local benefactor arranged to provide her with an annual stipend so she might concentrate on producing a novel. While she completed a draft, Seid was unhappy with it, and the same fate befell her second attempt. Although she felt she had disappointed her benefactor, she did not abandon her writing. To support herself and her family, Seid accepted a position in publicity with the American Red Cross in 1941, where she remained until after World War II.

During this period, Seid continued to turn out stories and articles, placing several in prestigious periodicals. The Spring 1941 issue of Common Ground included "Red Necktie," which many considered to be one of her finer efforts. Her work also appeared in Harper's, The Crisis, the Jewish Spectator, and Crossroad. Several of her stories were included in anthologies.

In 1945, Seid's completed manuscript Wasteland won the Harper Prize for the best novel about American life. The book dealt with the problems facing second-generation Russian Jewish immigrants, including a disdain for tradition and a shame over family. With the $10,000 prize, Seid was able to provide for herself and her family. It also helped that her novel earned respectful reviews. She went on to write three more novels: Sing at My Wake (McGraw, 1951), The Changelings (McGraw, 1955) and Anna Teller (McKay, 1960).

Although Wasteland is the best known of Sinclair's novels, the later books seem more powerful and sensitive. Sinclair is much more successful when she presents female characters and when she attempts to show the integration of international, emotional, spiritual and religious features of the individual life. The Changelings presents the problems of a changing environment (the influx of blacks into a neighborhood of Eastern European immigrants) on the children of the community. The emotional trauma of change and the pain of hate are fully experienced by the young Judith Vincent.

Her novels Sing at My Wake and Anna Teller portray the pain of youth, the complexity of the parent-child relationship and the rarity of sexual fulfillment in a woman's life. Sing at My Wake was based almost entirely on the true story of Seid's close friend Margaret Lyons Diederich, Margaret's estranged husband, Thomas, and their son, Thomas Jr. (all three natives of Cleveland, Ohio). Catherine Ganly, the heroine in Sing at My Wake, presents the unhappiness of a woman's existence in 20th-century America. As a child her mercurial mother baffles her and as a young wife her husband's depression destroys her sexual satisfaction. Only in her affair with Paul Randolph, a sculptor, does Catherine realize herself as a woman. But this sexual awakening is a conflation of sex and death.

The fictional Anna Hurvitz Teller is, on the other hand, the prototypical strong immigrant woman who overcomes this unhappiness of the 20th-century American female by sheer determination. Perceived by outsiders, the Teller home is perfection; experienced by the participants, the home is a depressed one. In this novel, Sinclair associates Jewishness with pain and deformity and depression with sexual dissatisfaction.

Although Sinclair often is included in discussions of American-Jewish novelists, her interest in the painful psychology of the 20th-century human transcends the boundaries such a category suggests. Her characters must confront their own pasts as well as learn to accept the values and pasts of others. In Anna Teller, the Tellers' Jewishness is peripheral. Emil feels unidentified with Jewish peoplehood, but joining a temple does not assuage his pain; acceptance of his mother as a strong, but human and loving woman does. In Sing at My Wake, the only characters who are Jewish are Phil and Anne Barron, friends of the heroine.

Seid published four novels in her career. Many of her short stories have appeared in anthologies. She also produced the memoir The Seasons: Death and Transfiguration, (Feminist Press, 1993). Seid continued to produce short stories and articles, but her output slowed somewhat as she aged. She succumbed to cancer on April 4, 1995 at age 81 at her home in Jenkintown, Pennsylvania.

== Literature ==
- Howard Gotlieb Archival Research Center
- Jewish Women's Archive (JWA)
- Boston University's Library Catalog
