= Wineville Chicken Coop murders =

Series of abductions and murders of young boys

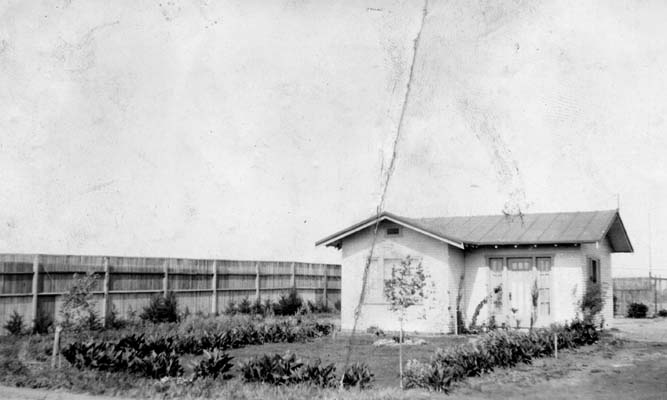
- Northcott's ranch

- Location in Riverside County and the U.S.-state of California
- Location: 6330 Wineville Ave Jurupa Valley, California 91752
- Date: 1926–1928
- Attack type: Child murder by bludgeoning, serial murder, child abduction
- Weapon: Axe
- Deaths: 3 confirmed, 10 confessed (Note: Confirmed victims: Headless Mexican (as referred to in court case; possibly Alvin Gothea); Lewis Winslow; Nelson Winslow; Sarah Louise Northcott confessed and was convicted of the murder of Walter Collins, but his death is not confirmed.)
- Injuries: 1 (Sanford Clark)
- Perpetrators: Gordon Stewart Northcott; Sarah Louise Northcott
- No. of participants: 3
- Verdict: Gordon: Guilty on all counts Sarah: Pleaded guilty
- Convictions: First-degree murder (3 counts for Gordon, 1 count for Sarah)
- Sentence: Gordon: Death; Sarah: Life imprisonment

Between 1926 and 1928, Canadian Gordon Stewart Northcott abducted and murdered three boys, and was implicated, but not convicted in the murder of a fourth boy, in Los Angeles and Riverside counties, California, United States. The remains of three of the boys were found at his farm in Wineville (now Mira Loma), with the fourth being found in La Puente. The case later became known as the Wineville Chicken Coop murders.

Northcott, a native of Canada, moved to the U.S. in 1924 with his parents. His mother Sarah Northcott and his young nephew Sanford Clark were also suspected in participating in the murders. Learning that the authorities were searching for him, Northcott fled to Canada along with his mother and was arrested while visiting his sister (Sanford Clark's mother) in Canada in November 1928. The case received national attention because one of the assumed victims was 9-year-old Walter Collins, whose disappearance in March 1928 had led to an impostor claiming Walter's identity for several days in a widely publicized case.

Ultimately, Gordon Northcott was found guilty of three murders (the Winslow Brothers and Alvin Gothea) in February 1929 and was executed at San Quentin State Prison in October 1930. Sarah Northcott was found guilty in the murder of Walter Collins.

== Murders ==
Gordon Stewart Northcott was born in Bladworth, Saskatchewan, and raised in British Columbia, Canada. He moved to Los Angeles, California, with his parents in 1924. Two years later, at age 19, Northcott asked his father to purchase a plot of land in the community of Wineville (now Mira Loma), located in Riverside County, where he built a chicken ranch and a house with the help of his father and his nephew, 14-year-old Sanford Clark. It was under this pretext that Northcott brought Clark from Bladworth to the U.S. Upon Clark's arrival at the Wineville ranch, Northcott began to physically and sexually abuse him.

In August 1928, concerned for Clark's welfare, his 19-year-old older sister Jessie visited him at the Wineville ranch. Clark told her that he feared for his life and that Northcott had murdered four boys (3 of whom were murdered at his ranch). Upon her return to Canada a week later, Jessie informed a U.S. consul of Northcott's crimes. The consul wrote a letter to the Los Angeles Police Department (LAPD) detailing Jessie's sworn complaint. Because there was initially some concern over an immigration issue, the LAPD contacted the United States Immigration Service to determine facts relating to the complaint.

On August 31, 1928, Immigration Service inspectors Judson F. Shaw and George W. Scallorn visited the ranch. Upon seeing the agents driving up the long road to his ranch, Northcott fled into the treeline at the edge of his property, telling Clark to stall them and threatening to shoot him from the treeline with a rifle if he did not comply. For the next two hours while Clark stalled, Northcott continued running. Finally, when Clark felt that the agents could protect him, he told them that Northcott had fled.

Northcott and his mother Sarah Louise Northcott fled to Canada but were arrested near Vernon, British Columbia, on September 19. Clark testified at Sarah Louise's sentencing that Northcott had kidnapped, molested, beaten, and killed three young boys at the ranch, with the help of Sarah Louise and Clark. Clark also testified about the murder of a fourth boy, a Mexican citizen (possibly Alvin Gothea). Gothea's murder did not occur at the Wineville Chicken Ranch, but rather near the town of La Puente. Northcott beheaded the victim and brought the head back to his ranch and ordered Clark to burn the boy's severed head in a fire pit and crush the skull. Northcott stated that he "left the headless body by the side of the road near [La] Puente because he had no other place to put it." Regarding the 3 boys that were murdered at the ranch, Clark stated that quicklime was used for disposal of the remains and that the bodies were buried on the ranch.

=== Body parts found ===
Authorities found three shallow graves at the ranch in the exact location given by Clark. These graves did not contain complete bodies but only parts. Clark and his sister Jessie testified that Northcott and his mother had exhumed the bodies on the evening of August 4, a few weeks before Clark was taken into protective custody. They had taken the bodies to a deserted area, where they were most likely burned in the night. Those three bodies were never recovered.

The evidence found in the graves at the ranch, consisted of "51 parts of human anatomy... those silent bits of evidence, of human bones and blood, have spoken and corroborated the testimony of living witnesses."

=== Aftermath ===
Wineville changed its name to Mira Loma in 1930, in large part because of the negative publicity surrounding the murders. The new cities of Eastvale and Jurupa Valley took different parts of the area of Mira Loma in 2010 and 2011, respectively. Wineville Avenue, Wineville Road, Wineville Park and other geographic references provide reminders of the community's former name. Clark returned to Saskatoon, where he died on June 20, 1991.

== Imprisonment and execution ==
Canadian police arrested Northcott and Sarah Louise on September 19, 1928. Because of errors in the extradition paperwork, they were not returned to Los Angeles until November 30. While the two were being held in British Columbia awaiting extradition, Sarah confessed to the murders, including the murder of nine-year-old Walter Collins. But before extradition, she retracted her confession, as did Northcott, who had confessed to killing more than five boys.

After they had been extradited, Sarah once again confessed and pleaded guilty to killing Collins. She was not tried, as upon her plea of guilty, she was sentenced to life imprisonment on December 31, sparing her a death sentence because she was a woman. During her sentencing hearing, she claimed that her son was innocent and offered numerous claims about his parentage, including that he was an illegitimate son of an English nobleman, that she was his grandmother, and that he was the result of incest between her husband Cyrus George Northcott and their daughter. She also stated that as a child, he was sexually abused by the entire family. After sentencing, Sarah attempted to commit suicide and begged the authorities to spare her son's life. After learning that her son would be hanged, Sarah begged the authorities to hang her as well. She served her sentence at Tehachapi State Prison and was paroled in 1940. She died in 1944.

Gordon Northcott was implicated in the murder of Collins, but because his mother had already confessed and been sentenced for it, the state did not prosecute Northcott for that murder. It was speculated that Northcott may have killed as many as 20 boys, but the state of California could not produce evidence to support that allegation. Ultimately, the state only brought an indictment against Northcott for the murders of an unidentified underage Mexican national (known as the "headless Mexican") and the brothers Lewis and Nelson Winslow (aged 12 and 10, respectively). The brothers had been reported missing from Pomona on May 16, 1928.

In early 1929, Northcott's trial was held before Judge George R. Freeman in Riverside County, California. The jury heard that Northcott had kidnapped, molested, tortured and murdered the Winslow brothers and the "headless Mexican." On February 8 the 27-day trial ended, and Northcott was convicted of the murders. On February 13 Freeman sentenced Northcott to death, and Northcott was hanged on October 2, 1930, at San Quentin State Prison. He was 23 years old.

== People involved ==
=== Sanford Clark ===
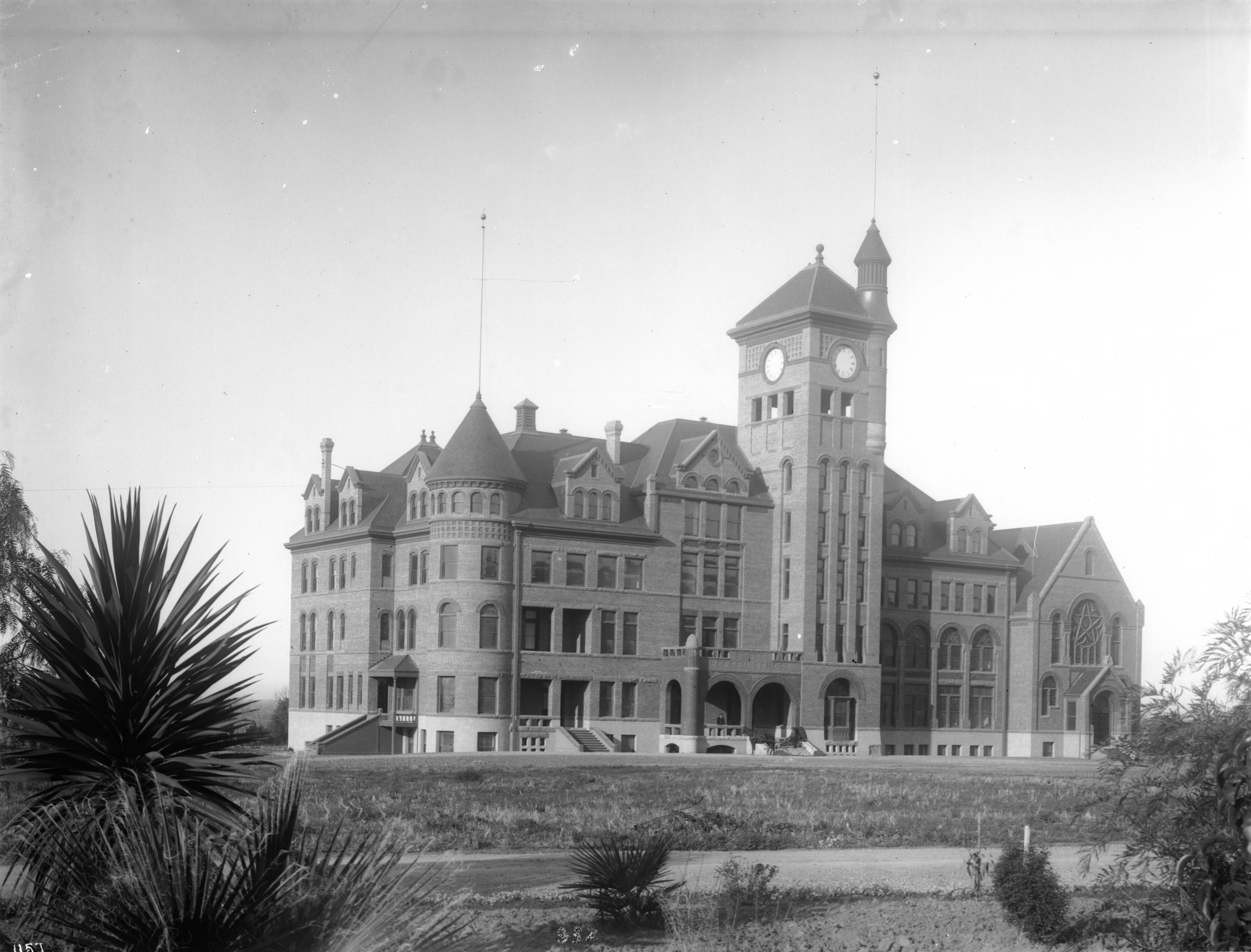
California State Reform School in Whittier, California, circa 1901

Clark was not tried for murder because assistant district attorney Loyal C. Kelley believed that he was innocent. Kelley said that Clark had been a victim of Northcott's death threats and sexual abuse and was not a willing participant in the crimes. Kelley instead recommended that Clark be sent to the Whittier State School (later renamed the Fred C. Nelles Youth Correctional Facility), where an experimental program for delinquent youths was under way. He assured Clark that the Whittier school was unique because of its compassionate mission of genuine rehabilitation. Clark was sentenced to five years at the school. His sentence was later commuted to 23 months, as he "had impressed the Trustees with his temperament, job skills and his personal desire to live a productive life during his nearly two years there."

Clark served in the Royal Canadian Army from 1939 to 1945 and worked in the Canadian Postal Service until age 61. He adopted two sons, Jerry and Robert Clark. Clark died in 1991 at age 78.

=== Walter Collins ===
Nine-year-old Walter Collins was abducted when he went to a movie theater on March 10, 1928, and never returned. He lived in Lincoln Heights, Los Angeles. Initially, his mother, Christine Collins, and the police believed that enemies of Walter Collins Sr. had abducted Walter. Walter Collins Sr. had been convicted of eight armed robberies and was an inmate at Folsom State Prison. Collins' disappearance received nationwide attention, and the LAPD pursued hundreds of leads without success. The police faced negative publicity and increasing public pressure to solve the case.

Five months after Collins' disappearance, a boy claiming to be Walter was found in DeKalb, Illinois. Letters and photographs were exchanged before Christine Collins paid for the boy to be transported to Los Angeles. A public reunion was organized by the police, who hoped to negate the bad publicity they had received for their failure to solve this case and others. The police also hoped that the uplifting story would deflect attention from a series of corruption scandals that had sullied the department's reputation. At the reunion, Christine stated that the boy was not her son. She was told by the officer in charge of the case, police captain J. J. Jones, to take the boy home to "try him out for a couple of weeks," to which she hesitantly agreed. Three weeks later, Christine returned to see Jones and persisted in her claim that the boy was not Walter. Although she had dental records proving her claim, Jones committed her to the psychiatric ward at Los Angeles County Hospital under "Code 12", a term used to jail or commit someone who was deemed difficult or inconvenient.

During Christine's incarceration, Jones questioned the boy, who admitted to being 12-year-old Arthur Hutchens Jr., a runaway originally from Iowa. A drifter at a roadside café in Illinois had told Hutchens of his resemblance to the missing Walter, so Hutchens devised a plan to impersonate Walter. His motive was to reach Hollywood so that he could meet his favorite actor, Tom Mix.

Christine was released 10 days after Hutchens admitted that he was not her son. She then filed a lawsuit against Jones and the LAPD. On September 13, 1930, she won the suit against Jones and was awarded $10,800 (equivalent to $193,000 in 2025), which Jones never paid. The last newspaper account of Christine dates from 1941, when she attempted to collect a $15,562 judgment against Jones, who had since retired.

Christine became hopeful that her son might still be alive after her first interview with Gordon Northcott. She asked Northcott if he had killed her son, and after listening to his repeated lies, confessions and recantations, she concluded that Northcott was insane. Because Northcott did not seem to know whether he had even met Walter, she clung to the hope that Walter was still alive. Northcott sent Christine a telegram shortly before his execution, saying he had lied when he denied that Walter was among his victims. He promised to tell the truth if she came in person to hear it. Just a few hours before the execution, Christine visited Northcott. But upon her arrival, he balked. When she confronted him, Northcott said "I don't want to see you. I don't know anything about it. I'm innocent."

A news account said, "The distraught woman was outraged by Northcott's conduct... but was also comforted by it. Northcott's ambiguous replies and his seeming refusal to remember such details as Walter's clothing and the color of his eyes gave her continued hope that her son still lived."

=== Lewis and Nelson Winslow ===
Lewis, 12, and Nelson, 10, were the sons of Nelson Winslow Sr. and his wife. The boys were abducted on May 16, 1928, from Pomona, California on their way home from a yacht club meeting. While Northcott was being held Riverside County Jail, Mr. Winslow led a lynch mob with the intent of hanging Northcott after the completion of his trial but before his sentencing. Police convinced the mob to disband.

=== Arthur J. Hutchens, Jr. ===
In 1933, Arthur J. Hutchens Jr. wrote about how and why he impersonated the missing boy, Walter Collins. Hutchens' biological mother had died in 1925 when he was nine years old, and he had been living with his stepmother, Violet Hutchens. Hutchens pretended to be Walter Collins to get as far away as possible from his stepmother. After living on the road for a month, he arrived in DeKalb, Illinois. When police brought him in, they began to ask him questions about Walter Collins. Initially he stated that he did not know about Walter but changed his story when he saw a chance of getting to California. He died in 1954.

=== Reverend Gustav Briegleb ===
Briegleb was a Presbyterian minister and an early radio evangelist. He was the pastor of St. Paul's Presbyterian Church on Jefferson Boulevard at Third Avenue in Los Angeles. He took up many important causes in Los Angeles in the 1920s and 1930s, most notably the poor handling of the Walter Collins kidnapping case in 1928. He fought to have Christine Collins released from a mental hospital after she was committed there in retaliation for disagreeing with the LAPD's version of events. He died in 1943 at age 61.

=== The boy who came forward ===
In 1935, five years after Northcott's execution, a boy and his parents came forward and spoke to authorities. Seven years earlier, (in 1928), the boy had gone missing, and the parents had reported his disappearance to the police. At the time of the boy's disappearance, authorities speculated that he might have been a murder victim at Wineville.

Sanford Clark, however, never told authorities that a boy had escaped from the chicken coop. The historical record and Clark's testimony indicate that only three boys were ever held in the chicken coop.

== In popular culture ==
- The 2008 Clint Eastwood directed film Changeling, starring John Malkovich and Angelina Jolie, is partly based on the Wineville Chicken Coop murders. The film centers around Christine Collins, her struggles against the LAPD, and her search to find Walter. In the film, Northcott is portrayed by Jason Butler Harner.
- "The Big Imposter"—episode #104 of the radio series Dragnet—was based upon these events. It aired on June 7, 1951. When the series was moved to television, the radio script was made into a teleplay which aired on December 4, 1952.
- One of the plotlines of American Horror Story: Hotel centers around the murders. In a flashback, the son of Ms. Evers, maid of the Hotel Cortez, is abducted by a man on Halloween. The surrounding events imply her son was one of Gordon Northcott's unidentified victims.
- "Body Farm", episode 12 of season 3 of the Investigation Discovery series Evil Kin, focuses on the Wineville Chicken Coop Murders, and examines early warning signs of Northcott's pedophilia, his abusive relationship with Sanford, Jessie's rescue of Sanford, and Sarah Louise's obsessive love for her son. It aired on October 6, 2015.
- The 2009 Criminal Minds episode "Haunted" features a character based on Gordon Stewart Northcott called the Hollow Creek Killer.

== See also ==
- List of murdered American children
- List of people who disappeared

== Bibliography ==
- Duffy, Clinton T. (1962). 88 Men and 2 Women. Doubleday.
- Flacco, Anthony; Clark, Jerry (November 2009). The Road Out of Hell: Sanford Clark and the True Story of the Wineville Murders. Union Square Press. ISBN 978-1-4027-6869-9.
- Jenkins, Philip (2004). Moral Panic: Changing Concepts of the Child Molester in Modern America. Yale University Press. p. 221. ISBN 0-300-10963-6.
- Jenkins, Philip (1994). Using Murder: The Social Construction of Serial Homicide. Aldine Transaction. p. 184. ISBN 0-202-30525-2.
- Leon, Chrysanthi Settlage (August 2011). Sex Fiends, Perverts, and Pedophiles: Understanding Sex Crime Policy in America. New York University Press. ISBN 978-0-8147-5326-2.
- Paul, James Jeffrey (September 2008). Nothing Is Strange with You: The Life and Crimes of Gordon Stewart Northcott. Xlibris. ISBN 978-1-4363-6627-4.
- Rasmussen, Cecilia (October 1998). L. A. Unconventional: The Men & Women Who Did L. A. Their Way. ISBN 978-1-883792-23-7.
