= Broadcast Film Critics Association Awards 2009 =

Broadcast Film Critics Association Awards 2009 may refer to:

- 14th Critics' Choice Awards, the fourteenth Critics' Choice Awards ceremony that took place in 2009
- 15th Critics' Choice Awards, the fifteenth Critics' Choice Awards ceremony that took place in 2010 and which honored the best in film for 2009
