= J. Edgar (score) =

Film score by Clint Eastwood
- Released: 2011
- Studio: Eastwood Scoring Stage, Burbank, California
- Genre: Film score
- Length: 29:55 / 37:06
- Label: Warner Bros.; WaterTower
- Producer: Clint Eastwood

Clint Eastwood chronology
Hereafter (2010)	J. Edgar (2011)

J. Edgar is the score soundtrack album to the 2011 film of the same name directed, produced and scored by Clint Eastwood, which is based on the career of FBI director J. Edgar Hoover. It stars Leonardo DiCaprio as the titular character alongside Armie Hammer, Naomi Watts, Josh Lucas, Judi Dench and Adam Driver, the latter in his film debut.

Eastwood composed and recorded the score at the Warner Bros. Eastwood Scoring Stage in Burbank, California, which accompanies mostly piano and low-end orchestra. The score received mixed reviews from critics who complimented the minimalistic and subtle voice, while noticing the repetitive appearance being felt unnecessary.

== Background ==
As with all of Eastwood's directorials since Mystic River (2003), with the exception of Letters from Iwo Jima (2006), Gran Torino (2008) and Invictus (2009), the score for J. Edgar is written by Eastwood himself. Eastwood noted that music and sound were important and had to be careful in the choices of music, especially for this film. Unlike Eastwood's previous scores which had a jazz-influence, he relied on a more orchestral score for composing J. Edgar. The score was recorded at the Eastwood Scoring Stage at the Warner Bros. Studios Burbank in late-September 2011 where Eastwood conducted the 60-piece orchestra from the Hollywood Studio Symphony. The score accompanies mostly piano and low-end orchestra, and Eastwood incorporates Johann Sebastian Bach's "Goldberg Variations" at regular intervals. He closely worked with the music editor Chris McGeary and sound editors Alan Robert Murray and Bob Asman on composing the score.

== Track listing ==
The original score for J. Edgar was released by Warner Bros. Pictures as a part of the For Your Consideration campaign aimed towards members of awards voting groups such as Academy of Motion Picture Arts and Sciences (AMPAS) and Hollywood Foreign Press Association (HFPA) for the 84th Academy Awards and 69th Golden Globe Awards respectively. The score was released only in physical CD formats.

No.	Title	Length
1.	"Opening Titles"	0:59
2.	"Bombed"	1:47
3.	"Helen Gandy / Young J. Edgar"	1:51
4.	"Personal Secretary"	1:12
5.	"Grab Your Guns"	2:20
6.	"Confidential File"	0:48
7.	"Leave the Transcripts"	0:52
8.	"Charles Lindbergh's Baby"	0:45
9.	"No Jurisdiction"	0:40
10.	"Just the Messenger"	1:38
11.	"Baby Note"	1:07
12.	"Found Dead in the Woods"	0:57
13.	"Blood on Our Hands"	0:20
14.	"Arrests"	1:35
15.	"Broken Taillight"	0:48
16.	"Clyde Don't Leave Me"	1:09
17.	"His Mother's Dress"	3:05
18.	"Thank You Helen"	2:55
19.	"J. Edgar Dies"	2:23
20.	"A Great American"	0:54
21.	"End Credits"	1:50
Total length:		29:55

The second promotional CD for the film score was released featuring more additional cues and alternates.

No.	Title	Length
1.	"1M01 v1 – Logos"	0:50
2.	"1M02 – Bombed"	1:46
3.	"1M03-4 – Helen Gandy / Mother Hoover"	1:47
4.	"1M05s – Source for Date"	1:40
5.	"1M06 – Personal Secretary"	1:09
6.	"2M01 – Grab Your Guns"	2:19
7.	"2M04 – Confidential File"	0:46
8.	"3M01 – Leave the Transcripts"	0:51
9.	"3M03 – Charles Lindbergh's Baby"	0:43
10.	"3M04 Alt – No Jurisdiction"	0:39
11.	"3M05 – Just the Messenger"	1:37
12.	"4M01 – Baby Note"	1:06
13.	"4M03 – Found Dead in the Woods"	0:56
14.	"4M04 – Blood on Our Hands"	0:49
15.	"4M05 – Dying Mother"	2:36
16.	"5M04 – Broken Taillight"	0:46
17.	"5M05 – Clyde Don't Leave Me"	1:08
18.	"6m03 – His Mother's Dress"	3:02
19.	"7M01 – Thank You Helen"	0:37
20.	"7M01a – Thank You Helen"	2:54
21.	"7M02 v1 – J. Edgar Dies"	2:22
22.	"7M02 v2 – J. Edgar Dies"	2:18
23.	"7M03 – A Great American"	0:53
24.	"7M04 – End Credits"	1:48
25.	"7M05 – End Credits Alt Ending"	1:44
Total length:		37:06

== Reception ==
The score received mixed response from critics, in particular, due to the repetitive appearance throughout the film's runtime, although praised for its minimalistic tone. Filmtracks found the score to be "disappointing" due to its monotonous approach, while Heather Phares of AllMusic considered the score to be "sparse" and "melodic".

Todd McCarthy of The Hollywood Reporter wrote "Once again, Eastwood has composed his own score, but this time out his spare and restrained piano backing feels insufficient to the task at hand, as the picture could have been helpfully propelled by a vigorous, full-bodied, old-school Hollywood score." Peter Rainer of The Christian Science Monitor called it a "spare, lachrymose piano score, with – inexplicably – snatches of Bach's "Goldberg Variations" woven in." Jake Coyle of Today called it a "loving, mediocre piano score". Bill Wine of CBS News wrote "Eastwood, who also composed the music, doesn't exactly sweep the bromance angle under the rug and back into the closet, but it is handled with levels of restraint and ambiguity that border on coyness." Tyler Fanrey of Mountain View Voice found the score to be "monotonous".

Brad Brevet of Comingsoon.net wrote "Eastwood also continues to serve as his own composer, layering the film in soft piano tones just as we have heard in virtually every film he has composed on his own, which is just one more aspect of J. Edgar that feels tired and lazy, not to mention unnecessary, as delicate notes begin to play almost out of nowhere in scenes where a score is entirely needless." David Thomson of The New Republic found it to be "sparse, stifled, yet sentimental". Chris Bumbray of JoBlo.com wrote "Eastwood’s piano score is also very low-key and minimalist, although it kicks in a bit more towards the end, and quite beautifully accompanies Hammer’s final scene as Tolson."

Despite its non-commercial release, the score was considered to be one of the 97 contenders for Academy Award for Best Original Score at the 84th Academy Awards, but failed to be shortlisted on the final nominations.

== Personnel ==
- Composer, conductor and orchestrator – Clint Eastwood
- Orchestra – Hollywood Studio Symphony
- Recording – Bob Fernandez
- Mixing – Tom Hardistry
- Music editor – Chris McGeary
