= Changling =

Changling may refer to:

== People ==
- Changling (Qing dynasty), (1758–1838) Qing dynasty official of Mongol descent
- He Changling (1785–1848), Chinese scholar and official of the Qing dynasty
- Wang Changling (698–755), major Tang dynasty poet
- Yang Changling (born 1965), Chinese wrestler
- Zhao Changling or Zulfiya Chinshanlo (born 1993), Kazakh weight lifter

== Places in China ==
- Changling County (长岭县), Jilin
- Changling, Yueyang (长岭街道), a subdistrict in Yunxi District, Yueyang, Hunan
- Changling Township, Henan (长陵乡), in Xi County

=== Towns ===
- Changling, Wangjiang County, Anhui; see Wangjiang County
- Changling, Chongqing, in Wanzhou District
- Changling, Hubei, in Guangshui
- Changling, Jilin, in Changling County
- Changling, Liaoning, in Zhuanghe
- Changling, Shandong, in Ju County

== Other uses ==
- Changling Rinpoche, a Tibetan Buddhist lineage
- Zhu Changling, a character in The Heaven Sword and Dragon Saber

== See also ==
- Changeling (disambiguation)
