= Changeling: The Autobiography of Mike Oldfield =

2007 autobiography by Mike Oldfield

Changeling
- Author: Mike Oldfield
- Cover artist: Rex Features (Jacket photo)
- Language: English
- Subject: Autobiography
- Genre: Non-fiction
- Publisher: Virgin
- Publication date: 10 May 2007
- Publication place: United Kingdom
- Media type: Hardcover, Paperback
- Pages: 272
- ISBN: 978-1-85227-381-1
- OCLC: 84151489

Changeling (ISBN 978-1852273811) is a 2007 autobiography by Mike Oldfield. It was published in May 2007 by Virgin Books. In May 2008 Changeling was re-released in a paperback edition.

Changeling was published by Virgin Books, the publishing arm of the conglomerate Virgin Group whose Virgin Records business was launched with the release of Oldfield's debut album, Tubular Bells.

== Content ==
The book mainly focuses on Oldfield's life and early career, from his humble beginnings with his family, through his tough musical teenage years and finding fame and fortune with Tubular Bells. Changeling also goes into Oldfield's years suffering panic attacks and his Exegesis experience, as well as detailing the writing and recording process of his albums, focusing on his earlier work.

== Profits ==
For the first two years all profits made by the book went to the mental health charity SANE.
