= Deborah Hopper =

American costume designer

Deborah Ann Hopper
- Awards: 12th Annual Hollywood Film Festival Award Hollywood Costume Designer of the Year for Changeling, Gran Torino

Deborah Ann Hopper is a costume designer who has collaborated with Clint Eastwood on 17 films over the last 20 years.

== Biography ==
Hopper started her career as a costume designer for opera and ballet productions. She has been working in film since 1983.

Hopper has worked closely with director Clint Eastwood for more than 20 years on films. According to Hopper she typically spends several months collecting vintage items and recreating period clothes from photographs. It is all part of her minimalist philosophy towards costuming. Hopper stated, "With the work that I do with Clint, his movies are basically everyday life, so the costumes that I deal with are everyday clothes. The costumes, in a way, have to be invisible. If they show then I think it’s kind of distracting. It should be more about the story."

== Filmography ==
=== Costume designer ===
Year	Film	Director	Notes
2024	Juror #2	Clint Eastwood	
2021	Cry Macho	Clint Eastwood	
2012	Trouble with the Curve	Robert Lorenz	Clint Eastwood as Gus Lobel; Produced by Clint Eastwood
2011	J. Edgar	Clint Eastwood	
2010	Hereafter	Clint Eastwood	
2009	Invictus	Clint Eastwood	
2008	Gran Torino	Clint Eastwood	Clint Eastwood as Walt Kowalski
2008	Changeling	Clint Eastwood	
2006	Letters from Iwo Jima	Clint Eastwood	
2006	Flags of Our Fathers	Clint Eastwood	
2004	Million Dollar Baby	Clint Eastwood	Clint Eastwood as Frankie Dunn
2003	Mystic River	Clint Eastwood	Original Music by Clint Eastwood
2002	Blood Work	Clint Eastwood	Clint Eastwood as Terry McCaleb
2000	Space Cowboys	Clint Eastwood	Clint Eastwood as Frank Corvin; Original Music by Clint Eastwood
1996	Dear God	Garry Marshall	
1990	Impulse	Sondra Locke	
1988	Shakedown on the Sunset Strip	Walter Grauman	(TV)

=== Costume and Wardrobe Department ===
Year	Film	Director	Job	Notes
2001	America's Sweethearts	Joe Roth	assistant costume designer	
1999	The Haunting	Jan de Bont	costume supervisor	
1999	True Crime	Clint Eastwood	costume supervisor	Clint Eastwood as Steve Everett
1997	Absolute Power	Clint Eastwood	costume supervisor	Clint Eastwood as Luther Whitney
1996	Mulholland Falls	Lee Tamahori	costume supervisor	
1995	Showgirls	Paul Verhoeven	costume supervisor	
1994	Exit to Eden	Garry Marshall	wardrobe supervisor	
1994	Intersection	Mark Rydell	costume supervisor: Los Angeles	
1992	Chaplin	Richard Attenborough	costume supervisor: women, Los Angeles	
1992	Death Becomes Her	Robert Zemeckis	costumer	
1992	Basic Instinct	Paul Verhoeven	costume supervisor: women, Los Angeles	
1991	Dead Again	Kenneth Branagh	costumer	
1991	Defending Your Life	Albert Brooks	set costumer	
1990	The Rookie	Clint Eastwood	costume supervisor: women	Clint Eastwood as Nick Pulovski
1989	Pink Cadillac	Buddy Van Horn	costume supervisor: women	Clint Eastwood as Tommy Nowak
1989	Troop Beverly Hills	Jeff Kanew	costumer	
1988	The Dead Pool	Buddy Van Horn	costume supervisor: women	Clint Eastwood as Insp. 'Dirty' Harry Callahan
1988	Bird	Clint Eastwood	costume supervisor	
1986	Heartbreak Ridge	Clint Eastwood	wardrobe: women; as Deborah Ann Hopper	Clint Eastwood as Sergeant Thomas Highway
1986	Ratboy	Sondra Locke	wardrobe: women; as Deborah Ann Hopper	
1985	Pale Rider	Clint Eastwood	wardrobe: women; as Deborah Ann Hopper	Clint Eastwood as Preacher
1985	Chiller	Wes Craven	costumer: women	
1985	Tightrope	Richard Tuggle	wardrobe: women; as Deborah Ann Hopper	Clint Eastwood as Capt. Wes Block
1984	Revenge of the Nerds	Jeff Kanew	costumer: women	
1983	All the Right Moves	Michael Chapman	costumer: women	

== Awards ==
Year	Result	Award	Category	Recipient(s)
2009	Nominated	British Academy of Film and Television Arts	BAFTA Award for Best Costume Design	Changeling
2008	Won	12th Annual Hollywood Film Festival Award	Hollywood Costume Designer of the Year	Changeling, Gran Torino
2008	Nominated	11th Costume Designers Guild Awards	Excellence in Period Film	Changeling
1988	Won	Emmy	Outstanding Achievement in Costuming for a Miniseries or a Special	Shakedown on the Sunset Strip
