= The Changelings (novel) =

1955 novel by Jo Sinclair

- Author: Jo Sinclair
- Cover artist: Richard M. Powers
- Language: English
- Genre: Bildungsroman, Jewish American literature,
- Publisher: McGraw Hill
- Publication date: 1955
- Publication place: United States
- Media type: Print (Paperback)
- Pages: 323 pp

The Changelings is a novel by Jo Sinclair (Ruth Seid) first published in 1955 by McGraw Hill. Features tomboy protagonist Judith "Vincent" Vincent, a 12-year-old who is the newly deposed leader of a gang of pre-teen and teenage children in her Jewish/Sicilian neighborhood in Cleveland, Ohio.

The novel follows the lives of several of the children and adults in the neighborhood in late summer through fall as African Americans begin to move into their neighborhood and their neighbors begin to move to "the heights." During this time, Vincent befriends Clara, a 12-year-old African American tomboy who lives a few blocks south of her neighborhood. She also deals with her sister's ostracization from the family for marrying a non-Jew.

== Families ==
=== The Vincents ===
They rent their "upstairs" to the Levines. They also share their telephone with them.

- Judith "Vincent" Vincent – Twelve years old, a tomboy, and the book's protagonist. She wears her brother, Nathan's, pants and has recently been deposed as the leader of her neighborhood gang of boys. She longs for a personal relationship with God.
- Mr. Abe Vincent – a painter, by trade. At one time, he owned his own contracting company, but had no business sense, charged too little for his jobs, and went out of business. He is happier working for other men. He follows the lead of his mother, who constantly disapproves of him and his choices.
- Grandmother Vincent – The matriarch of the Vincent Family. She was a proprietor of a shop, married a man to gain citizenship, then divorced him. She is wealthy and has decided she wants to die in Palestine. She ostracized Shirley when Shirley married a non-Jew.
- Mrs. Sonia Vincent
- Nate Vincent – Judith's older brother
- Shirley O'Brien – Vincent's older sister who married an Irish man. She is considered "dead" to Mr. Vincent and Grandmother Vincent.
- Emmanuel "Manny" O'Brien – Shirley's infant son. Vincent is very attached to Manny and sees him as a symbol of salvation for the family.
- Johnnie O'Brien – An Irish firefighter. Shirley's husband.

=== The Goldens ===
- Mrs. Sophie Golden – "a tall, big-boned woman in her fifties" (25). Her children resemble her.
- Mr. Herman Golden – works "in an exclusive downtown fur shop" (73)
- Jules Golden – bed-ridden 17-year-old with heart-disease who is very close to Vincent. He often writes Hemingway-esque poetry and wrote the poem "The Changelings" for Vincent on her twelfth birthday.
- Ida "Heidi" Golden – Jules' 22-year-old sister, "a stocky, muscular woman...with restlessly sullen eyes" (28). Her parents "hound" her to get married. She has a crush on Chip Levine. She also hears Santina and Alex talking in the gang clubhouse and thinks Santina is sleeping with a black man. She spreads this gossip.
- Becky Golden – Daughter of Mr. and Mrs. Golden. She is older than Jules. She is mentally handicapped and needs constant supervision and care.
- Alex Golden – Youngest Golden son. Is sleeping with Santina Valenti. She calls him "Blacky."
- Uncle Nathan – Sophie's brother, who is wealthy, lives in the Heights and gives Herman after-hours jobs.

=== The Zigmans ===
- Mr. Morris Zigman – Owns a poultry shop. Speaks better Polish than his customers.
- Mrs. Fanny Zigman – Wife of Morris – is the one who "really" runs the poultry shop (64).
- Dave Zigman – the youngest brother of three, a sensitive boy, and Vincent's on-again-off-again best friend. Works for his parents in the poultry shop and making deliveries in the neighborhood.
- Al Zigman – Dave's brother, described as a "gangster" and a "gambler". Has a girlfriend named Elaine.
- Nicky Zigman – The family/store dog.

=== The Millers ===
- Ruth Miller
- Herb Miller
- Mr. Miller
- Mrs. Miller
- Ben Miller
- Flo Miller
- Alice Miller

=== The Levines ===
- Chip Levine – A former boxer, sells newspapers. Is courting Ruth Miller. Brings her fruit in her store every Saturday.
- Moe Levine
- Mrs. Levine

=== The Valentis ===
- Mrs. Valenti – the "spunyitze"
- Santina Valenti – Mrs. Valenti's Granddaughter and Alex Golden's girlfriend.
- Ross Valenti

== Sources ==
- The Changelings on Google Books
