= Changeling (soundtrack) =

Changeling: Original Motion Picture Soundtrack

Film score by Clint Eastwood
- Released: November 4, 2008
- Genre: Film score
- Length: 41:30
- Label: Varèse Sarabande
- Producer: Robert Townson

Changeling is the score to the 2008 film produced and directed by Clint Eastwood. In common with all his films since Mystic River (2003), composed the music himself. The score is jazz- and bebop-influenced, and mainly low-key, featuring lilting guitars and strings. The addition of brass instruments has its roots in film noir and plays to the film's setting in a city controlled by corrupt police. The theme shifts from piano to a full orchestra, and as the story develops the strings become more imposing, with increasing numbers of sustains and rises. Voices reminiscent of those in a horror film score are introduced during the film's flashback scenes to the child murders. Eastwood's bassist son, Kyle, played on the soundtrack. The score was released on CD in North America on November 4, 2008 through record label Varèse Sarabande.

== Track listing ==
Changeling: Original Motion Picture Soundtrack
No.	Title	Length
1.	"Main Title"	1:57
2.	"Ride to School"	1:23
3.	"Mom's on Call/Late to Trolley"	1:39
4.	"Looking for Walter/Waiting for Police"	1:41
5.	"Where Do You Live/Who Are You"	2:33
6.	"I Want My Son Back"	1:52
7.	"Arrive at Ranch/Looking for Sanford"	2:13
8.	"People Can't Change"	1:41
9.	"We Killed Some Kids"	6:18
10.	"I Won't Sign It"	2:44
11.	"Sanford Digs"	2:52
12.	"Room 18"	0:55
13.	"What Is Happening/Trial Montage"	1:46
14.	"Davey Tells Story"	4:38
15.	"I Want to Go Home"	1:01
16.	"End Title"	6:17
Total length:		41:30
