= Disappearance of Walter Collins =

1928 disappearance of a nine-year-old boy in California

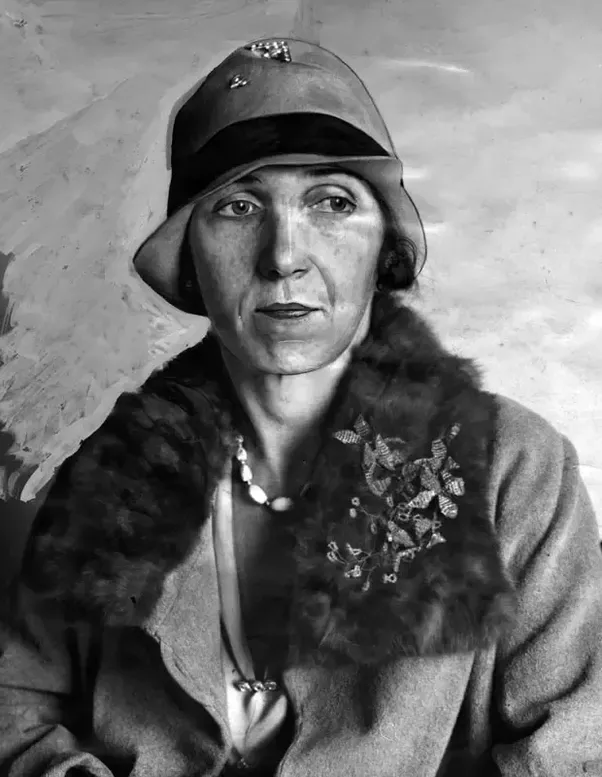
Christine Collins, the victim's mother, c. 1928

On March 10, 1928, Walter Collins, a 9-year-old American boy, went missing. He was last seen in Los Angeles, California by his mother, Christine Collins, earlier that day when he left to go to a movie theater.

Five months after Walter went missing, a different boy claiming to be (and later found out to have not been) Walter was found in DeKalb, Illinois. When Christine insisted that the boy was not her son and presented dental records to prove it, the Los Angeles Police Department accused her of being a bad mother and had her committed to a mental hospital until the boy confessed that he was not her son.

Investigators in California later concluded that Walter had been murdered by Gordon Stewart Northcott, as part of the Wineville Chicken Coop murders.

== Background ==
Walter Conrad Collins was born in September 1918. His parents were Christine Collins (née Dunne; December 14th, 1888 – December 8th, 1964), and Walter Joseph Collins (born Walter Joseph Anson), a convict who was serving a prison sentence at the time of his son's disappearance.

== Disappearance ==
Walter disappeared on March 10, 1928, after Christine gave him money to go to the movies. Walter's disappearance received nationwide attention, and the Los Angeles Police Department followed up on hundreds of leads without success. The police faced negative publicity and increasing public pressure to solve the case. Then, five months after Walter's disappearance, a boy claiming to be Walter was found in DeKalb, Illinois. Letters and photographs were exchanged before Christine paid for the boy to be brought to Los Angeles.

=== Impostor and abusive internment ===
At the reunion, Christine said that the boy was not Walter. Under pressure to resolve the case, the officer in charge, Captain J. J. Jones, convinced her to "try the boy out" by taking him home. She returned three weeks later, again saying that he was not her son. Although she had dental records and backing from friends to prove her case, Jones accused her of being a bad mother and bringing ridicule to the police. Jones had Christine committed to the psychiatric ward at Los Angeles County Hospital under a "Code 12" internment – a term used to jail or commit someone who was deemed difficult or an inconvenience.

Jones questioned the boy, who admitted to being 12-year-old Arthur Hutchens Jr., a runaway from Iowa. Hutchens was picked up by police in Illinois and, when asked if he was Walter Collins, he first said no, but then said yes. His motive for posing as Walter was to get to Hollywood so he could meet his favorite actor, Tom Mix. Christine was not released until ten days after Hutchens admitted that he was not her son and filed a lawsuit against the Los Angeles Police Department. She won a lawsuit against Jones and was awarded $10,800 (equivalent to $210,000 in 2025), which Jones refused to pay. The actions of the LAPD outraged the public, and were "particularly embarrassing" for chief James Davis.

=== Aftermath ===
In 1929, Gordon Stewart Northcott was found guilty of abducting, molesting, and killing three young boys in what became known as the Wineville Chicken Coop murders. Gordon's mother, Sarah Louise Northcott, confessed in late 1928 to her participation in the murders and to Walter Collins being one of her son's victims. Following her confession, she was sentenced without trial to life imprisonment for her role in Walter's death. The state chose not to prosecute Gordon for Walter's murder and instead brought him to trial for the murders of three other young boys for which there was also forensic evidence. On February 13, 1929, he was found guilty of all three murders and sentenced to death. Despite these convictions, Gordon denied killing Walter, and Sarah later attempted to rescind her confession and gave other scattered and inconsistent statements.

Christine continued to believe her son was still alive in spite of the guilty plea entered by Sarah to a judge, and corroborating testimony by Sanford Clark. She corresponded with Gordon and received permission to interview him shortly before his execution. He pledged to explain the true account of her son's fate, but he recanted at the last minute and professed his innocence of any involvement. Christine was further encouraged by the appearance of another boy whom Gordon had abducted and probably molested, and whom the police initially believed had been murdered. Christine continued to search for her son for the rest of her life. She attempted several times to collect the money owed her by Jones, including a 1941 court case, in which she attempted to collect a $15,562 judgment (equivalent to $340,000 in 2025) in the Superior Court.

Christine Collins died less than a week before her 76th birthday, on December 8, 1964.

== Portrayal in media ==
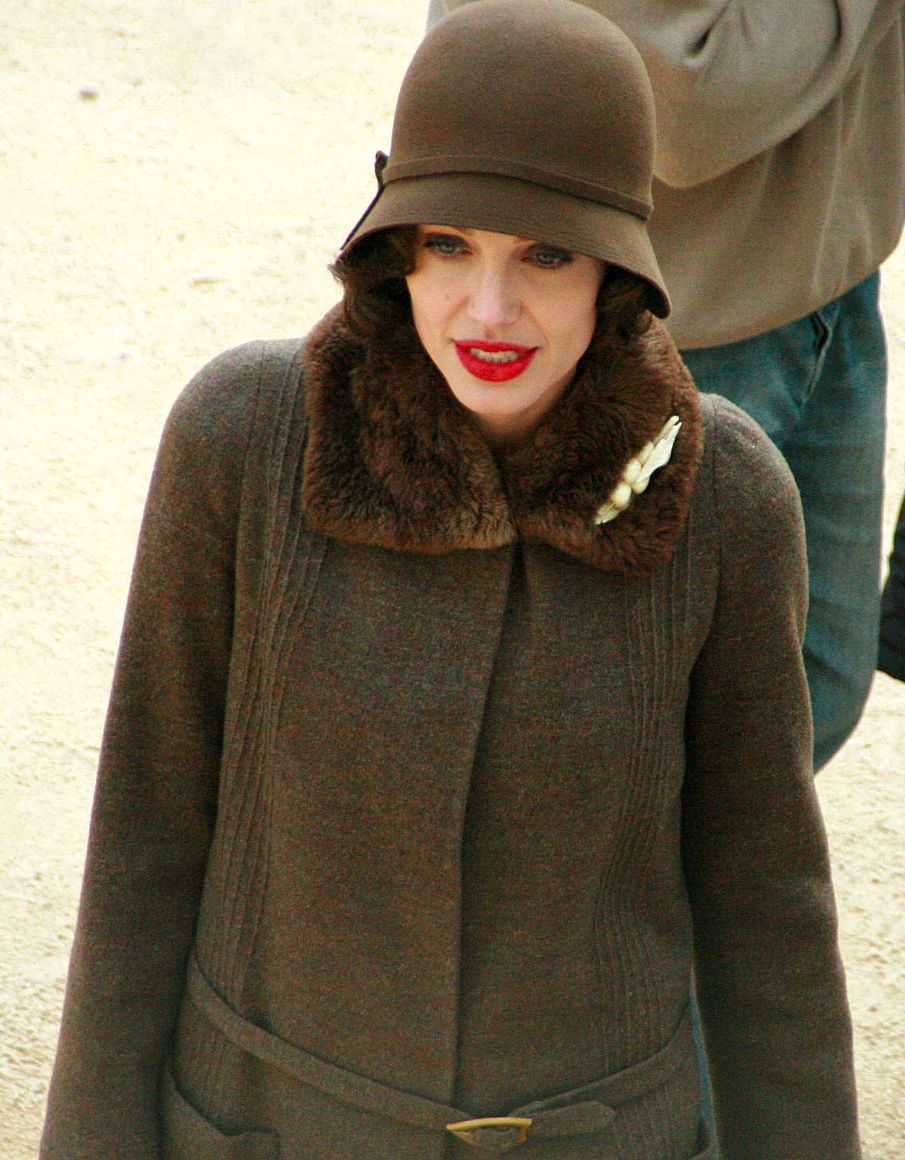
Angelina Jolie in character as Christine Collins, while filming on the set of Changeling in 2007

- The Big Imposter, the June 7, 1951, episode of the radio program Dragnet where a boy disappears in Los Angeles and is seemingly found about 9 months later in Dayton, Ohio, when a runaway is caught by police and claims to be the missing boy. The impostor is brought to Los Angeles and "reunited" with the missing boys' grandfather, but eventually the grandfather realizes the boy is not his grandson and the imposter admits the ruse under questioning by the police. Four months later the body of the actual missing boy is found buried at a farm on the outskirts of Riverside, California, the victim of murder.
- Changeling, a 2008 film directed by Clint Eastwood, depicts the events from the disappearance of Walter Collins in 1928 until the reappearance of one of Northcott's other victims in 1935. Christine Collins was portrayed by Angelina Jolie, who was nominated for the Academy Award for Best Actress.

== See also ==
- Wineville Chicken Coop murders § Walter Collins
- List of solved missing person cases (pre-1950)
- Personation
