= List of awards and nominations received by Angelina Jolie =

Awards list of Angelina Jolie

Angelina Jolie awards and nominations
- Jolie at the Global Summit to End Sexual Violence in Conflict, 2012
Awards and nominations
Award	Wins	Nominations
Academy Awards	2	3
Actor Awards	2	4
BAFTA Awards	0	2
Critics' Choice Awards	1	7
Emmy Awards	0	2
Golden Globes	3	9
Tony Awards	1	1

Totals (Note: Certain award groups do not simply award one winner. They acknowledge several different recipients, have runners-up, and have third place. Since this is a specific recognition and is different from losing an award, runner-up mentions are considered wins in this award tally. For simplification and to avoid errors, each award in this list has been presumed to have had a prior nomination.)
- Wins: 65
- Nominations: 157

American actress Angelina Jolie has won two Academy Awards, two Actor Awards, three Golden Globes, and a Tony Award, as well as nominations for two BAFTA Awards and two Primetime Emmy Awards.

Jolie won the Academy Award for Best Supporting Actress for playing a diagnosed sociopath in the psychological thriller Girl, Interrupted (1999). She was nominated for the Academy Award for Best Actress for her portrayal of Christine Collins in the mystery crime drama Changeling (2008). She was nominated for an Actor Award and a Golden Globe for her role of Mariane Pearl in A Mighty Heart (2007). For the action films Sky Captain and the World of Tomorrow (2004), Mr. & Mrs. Smith (2005), Wanted (2008), and The Tourist (2010), Jolie received awards based on popular votes, including an MTV Movie Award, two People's Choice Awards, and four Teen Choice Awards.

For her performances in television, Jolie won the Golden Globe Award for Best Supporting Actress – Series, Miniseries or Television Film and was nominated for the Primetime Emmy Award for Outstanding Supporting Actress in a Limited or Anthology Series or Movie for her portrayal of Cornelia Wallace in the TNT television film George Wallace (1997). She also won the Actor Award for Outstanding Performance by a Female Actor in a Television Movie or Limited Series and Golden Globe Award for Best Actress – Miniseries or Television Film, as well as earning a nomination for the Primetime Emmy Award for Outstanding Lead Actress in a Limited or Anthology Series or Movie for playing Gia Carangi in the HBO film Gia (1998).

Jolie won a Tony Award for Best Musical as a producer of the Broadway production The Outsiders (2024). For her humanitarian work, she received the United Nations Association of the United States of America's Global Humanitarian Action Award in 2005, the International Rescue Committee's Freedom Award in 2007, and the Jean Hersholt Humanitarian Award in 2013.

== Major associations ==
=== Academy Awards ===
Year	Category	Work	Result	Ref.
2000	Best Supporting Actress	Girl, Interrupted	Won	
2009	Best Actress	Changeling	Nominated	
Governors Awards
2014	Jean Hersholt Humanitarian Award	—N/a	Honored	

=== Actor Awards ===
Year	Category	Nominated work	Result	Ref.
1999	Outstanding Actress in a Miniseries or Television Movie	Gia	Won	
2000	Outstanding Actress in a Supporting Role	Girl, Interrupted	Won	
2008	Outstanding Actress in a Leading Role	A Mighty Heart	Nominated	
2009	Outstanding Actress in a Leading Role	Changeling	Nominated	

=== BAFTA Awards ===
Year	Category	Nominated work	Result	Ref.
British Academy Film Awards
2009	Best Actress in a Leading Role	Changeling	Nominated	
2018	Best Film Not in the English Language	First They Killed My Father	Nominated	

=== Critics' Choice Awards ===
Year	Category	Nominated work	Result	Ref.
Film
1999	Best Supporting Actress	Girl, Interrupted	Won	
2007	Best Actress	A Mighty Heart	Nominated	
2008	Best Actress	Changeling	Nominated	
2014	Best Picture	Unbroken	Nominated	
2014	Best Director	Unbroken	Nominated	
2017	Best Foreign Language Film	First They Killed My Father	Nominated	
2025	Best Actress	Maria	Nominated	

=== Emmy Awards ===
Year	Category	Nominated work	Result	Ref.
Primetime Emmy Awards
1998	Outstanding Lead Actress in a Miniseries or a Movie	Gia	Nominated	
1998	Outstanding Supporting Actress in a Miniseries or a Movie	George Wallace	Nominated	

=== Golden Globes ===
Year	Category	Nominated work	Result	Ref.
1998	Best Supporting Actress – Television	George Wallace	Won	
1999	Best Actress in a Miniseries or Television Film	Gia	Won	
2000	Best Supporting Actress – Motion Picture	Girl, Interrupted	Won	
2008	Best Actress in a Motion Picture – Drama	A Mighty Heart	Nominated	
2009	Best Actress in a Motion Picture – Drama	Changeling	Nominated	
2011	Best Actress in a Motion Picture – Musical or Comedy	The Tourist	Nominated	
2012	Best Foreign Language Film	In the Land of Blood and Honey	Nominated	
2018	Best Foreign Language Film	First They Killed My Father	Nominated	
2025	Best Actress in a Motion Picture – Drama	Maria	Nominated	

=== Tony Awards ===
Year	Category	Nominated work	Result	Ref.
2024	Best Musical	The Outsiders	Won	

== Miscellaneous awards ==
Organizations	Year	Category	Work	Result	Ref.
American Film Institute Awards	2014	Movies of the Year	Unbroken	Won	
American Society of Cinematographers	2017	Board of Directors Award	First They Killed My Father	Won	
Alliance of Women Film Journalists	2007	Humanitarian Activism	Herself	Won	
Alliance of Women Film Journalists	2008	Humanitarian Activism	Herself	Nominated	
Alliance of Women Film Journalists	2009	Humanitarian Activism	Herself	Nominated	
Alliance of Women Film Journalists	2010	Humanitarian Activism	Herself	Nominated	
Alliance of Women Film Journalists	2011	Humanitarian Activism	Herself	Won	
Alliance of Women Film Journalists	2010	Best Female Action Star	Salt	Nominated	
Alliance of Women Film Journalists	2011	Best Animated Female	Kung Fu Panda 2	Nominated	
Alliance of Women Film Journalists	2013	Female Icon of the Year	Herself	Won	
Alliance of Women Film Journalists	2014	Female Icon of the Year	Herself	Nominated	
Astra Film Awards	2025	Best Actress	Maria	Nominated	
Berlin International Film Festival	2006	Silver Bear for Outstanding Artistic Contribution	The Good Shepherd	Won	
Behind the Voice Actors Awards	2011	Best Female Vocal Performance in a Feature Film	Kung Fu Panda 2	Nominated	
Behind the Voice Actors Awards	2011	Best Vocal Ensemble in a Feature Film	Kung Fu Panda 2	Won	
Blockbuster Entertainment Awards	1999	Favorite Supporting Actress – Drama	Girl, Interrupted	Won	
Blockbuster Entertainment Awards	1999	Favorite Actress – Suspense	The Bone Collector	Nominated	
Blockbuster Entertainment Awards	2000	Favorite Actress – Action	Gone in 60 Seconds	Won	
CableACE Awards	1997	Supporting Actress in a Movie or Miniseries	George Wallace	Nominated	
Empire Awards	1999	Best Actress	Girl, Interrupted	Nominated	
Empire Awards	2007	Best Actress	A Mighty Heart	Nominated	
Empire Awards	2008	Best Actress	Changeling	Nominated	
Golden Raspberry Awards	2001	Worst Actress	Lara Croft: Tomb Raider and Original Sin	Nominated	
Golden Raspberry Awards	2002	Worst Actress	Life or Something Like It	Nominated	
Golden Raspberry Awards	2003	Worst Actress	Beyond Borders; Lara Croft Tomb Raider: The Cradle of Life	Nominated	
Golden Raspberry Awards	2004	Worst Actress	Alexander and Taking Lives	Nominated	
Golden Schmoes Awards	2008	Actress of the Year	Changeling	Nominated	
Gotham Awards	2024	Performer Tribute	Maria	Honored	
Heartland International Film Festival	2014	Truly Moving Picture Award	Unbroken	Won	
Hollywood Film Awards	2017	Hollywood Foreign Language Film Award	First They Killed My Father	Won	
Hollywood Film Festival	1999	Hollywood Actress Award	Girl, Interrupted	Won	
IFTA Film & Drama Awards	2008	Best International Actress Award – People's Choice	Changeling	Nominated	
IFTA Film & Drama Awards	2025	Best International Actress	Maria	Nominated	
Independent Spirit Awards	2007	Best Female Lead	A Mighty Heart	Nominated	
Italian Online Movie Awards	2008	Best Actress	Changeling	Nominated	
MTV Movie & TV Awards	2002	Best Female Performance	Lara Croft: Tomb Raider	Nominated	
MTV Movie & TV Awards	2002	Best Fight	Lara Croft: Tomb Raider	Nominated	
MTV Movie & TV Awards	2006	Best Fight	Mr & Mrs Smith	Won	
MTV Movie & TV Awards	2006	Best Kiss (Note: Shared with Brad Pitt)	Mr & Mrs Smith	Nominated	
MTV Movie & TV Awards	2009	Best Villain	Beowulf	Nominated	
MTV Movie & TV Awards	2009	Best Female Performance	Wanted	Nominated	
MTV Movie & TV Awards	2009	Best WTF Moment	Wanted	Nominated	
MTV Movie & TV Awards	2009	Best Kiss (Note: Shared with James McAvoy)	Wanted	Nominated	
MTV Movie & TV Awards	2010	Biggest Badass Star	Salt	Nominated	
NAACP Image Awards	2007	Outstanding Actress in a Motion Picture	A Mighty Heart	Nominated	
NAACP Image Awards	2011	Outstanding Foreign Motion Picture	In the Land of Blood and Honey	Won	
NAACP Image Awards	2011	Outstanding Directing in a Motion Picture	In the Land of Blood and Honey	Nominated	
ShoWest Convention	1999	Supporting Actress of the Year	Girl, Interrupted	Won	
National Board of Review Awards	1998	Breakthrough Performance – Female	Playing by Heart	Won	
National Board of Review Awards	2014	Top Ten Films	Unbroken	Won	
National Board of Review Awards	2017	Freedom of Expression Award (Note: Tied with Let It Fall: Los Angeles 1982–1992)	First They Killed My Father	Won	
National Movie Awards	2008	Best Performance – Female	Wanted	Nominated	
NRJ Ciné Awards	2005	Best Fight	Mr. & Mrs. Smith	Won	
NRJ Ciné Awards	2005	Best Kiss	Mr. & Mrs. Smith	Won	
Nickelodeon Kids' Choice Awards	2002	Favorite Female Butt Kicker	Lara Croft: Tomb Raider	Nominated	
Nickelodeon Kids' Choice Awards	2015	Favorite Movie Actress	Maleficent	Nominated	
Nickelodeon Kids' Choice Awards	2015	Favorite Villain	Maleficent	Won	
Nickelodeon Kids' Choice Awards	2020	Favorite Movie Actress	Maleficent: Mistress of Evil	Nominated	
Nickelodeon Kids' Choice Awards	2022	Favorite Movie Actress	Eternals	Nominated	
Online Film Critics Society	2017	Best Foreign Language Film	First They Killed My Father	Nominated	
Outfest	1998	Outstanding Actress in a Feature Film	Gia	Won	
People's Choice Awards	2004	Favorite Female Action Star	Sky Captain and the World of Tomorrow	Won	
People's Choice Awards	2005	Favorite Female Action Star	Mr. & Mrs. Smith	Nominated	
People's Choice Awards	2005	Favorite Female Movie Star	Mr. & Mrs. Smith	Nominated	
People's Choice Awards	2005	Favorite On-Screen Match-Up	Mr. & Mrs. Smith	Nominated	
People's Choice Awards	2008	Favorite Female Action Star	Wanted	Won	
People's Choice Awards	2008	Favorite Female Movie Star	Wanted	Nominated	
People's Choice Awards	2009	Favorite Star 35 & Under	Herself	Nominated	
People's Choice Awards	2010	Favorite Action Star	Salt	Nominated	
People's Choice Awards	2010	Favorite Female Movie Star	Salt	Nominated	
People's Choice Awards	2015	Favorite Action Movie Actress	Maleficent	Nominated	
People's Choice Awards	2015	Favorite Movie Actress	Maleficent	Nominated	
Producers Guild of America Awards	2011	Stanley Kramer Award	In the Land of Blood and Honey	Won	
Rembrandt Awards	2010	Best International Actress	Salt	Won	
Satellite Awards	1998	Best Actress in a Miniseries or Television Film	Gia	Won	
Satellite Awards	2007	Best Actress in a Motion Picture – Drama	A Mighty Heart	Nominated	
Satellite Awards	2008	Best Actress in a Motion Picture – Drama	Changeling	Won	
Satellite Awards	2017	Best Foreign Language Film	First They Killed My Father	Nominated	
Satellite Awards	2025	Best Actress in a Motion Picture – Drama	Maria	Nominated	
Saturn Awards	2001	Best Actress	Lara Croft: Tomb Raider	Nominated	
Saturn Awards	2004	Best Supporting Actress	Sky Captain and the World of Tomorrow	Nominated	
Saturn Awards	2008	Best Actress	Changeling	Won	
Saturn Awards	2010	Best Actress	Salt	Nominated	
Saturn Awards	2014	Best Actress	Maleficent	Nominated	
Saturn Awards	2014	Best Action or Adventure Film	Unbroken	Won	
Santa Barbara International Film Festival	2007	Outstanding Performance of the Year	A Mighty Heart	Won	
Santa Barbara International Film Festival	2025	Maltin Modern Master Award	Maria	Won	
Scream Awards	2008	Best Fantasy Actress	Wanted	Won	
Teen Choice Awards	2000	Choice Movie Actress: Drama	Girl, Interrupted	Nominated	
Teen Choice Awards	2000	Choice Movie: Hissy Fit	Girl, Interrupted	Nominated	
Teen Choice Awards	2001	Choice Movie Actress: Action	Lara Croft: Tomb Raider	Nominated	
Teen Choice Awards	2005	Choice Movie: Scary Scene	Taking Lives	Nominated	
Teen Choice Awards	2005	Choice Movie Actress: Action	Mr. & Mrs. Smith	Won	
Teen Choice Awards	2005	Choice Movie: Chemistry	Mr. & Mrs. Smith	Nominated	
Teen Choice Awards	2005	Choice Movie: Dance Scene	Mr. & Mrs. Smith	Nominated	
Teen Choice Awards	2005	Choice Movie: Liar	Mr. & Mrs. Smith	Won	
Teen Choice Awards	2005	Choice Movie: Liplock	Mr. & Mrs. Smith	Nominated	
Teen Choice Awards	2005	Choice Movie: Rumble	Mr. & Mrs. Smith	Won	
Teen Choice Awards	2007	Choice Movie Actress: Drama	A Mighty Heart	Nominated	
Teen Choice Awards	2009	Choice Movie Actress: Drama	Changeling	Nominated	
Teen Choice Awards	2010	Choice Summer Movie Star: Female	Salt	Nominated	
Teen Choice Awards	2011	Choice Movie Actress: Action	The Tourist	Won	
Teen Choice Awards	2014	Choice Movie Actress: Action	Maleficent	Nominated	
Women's Image Network Awards	2017	Best Foreign Language Film	First They Killed My Father	Nominated	

== Critics associations ==
Organizations	Year	Category	Work	Result	Ref.
African-American Film Critics Association	2008	Best Actress	Changeling	Won	
Chicago Film Critics Association	1999	Best Supporting Actress	Girl, Interrupted	Nominated	
Chicago Film Critics Association	2007	Best Actress	A Mighty Heart	Nominated	
Chicago Film Critics Association	2008	Best Actress	Changeling	Nominated	
Chicago Indie Critics	2025	Best Actress	Maria	Nominated	
Dallas–Fort Worth Film Critics Association	2007	Best Actress	A Mighty Heart	Nominated	
Dallas–Fort Worth Film Critics Association	2024	Best Actress	Maria	4th place	
DiscussingFilm Critics Awards	2025	Best Actress	Maria	Nominated	
Houston Film Critics Society	2007	Best Actress	A Mighty Heart	Nominated	
Houston Film Critics Society	2008	Best Actress	Changeling	Nominated	
Houston Film Critics Society	2025	Best Actress	Maria	Nominated	
Las Vegas Film Critics Society	2024	Best Actress	Maria	Nominated	
London Film Critics' Circle	2007	Actress of the Year	A Mighty Heart	Nominated	
London Film Critics' Circle	2008	Actress of the Year	Changeling	Nominated	
New York Film Critics Online	2024	Best Actress	Maria	Nominated	
San Diego Film Critics Society	1999	Best Supporting Actress	Girl, Interrupted	Nominated	
San Francisco Bay Area Film Critics Circle	2024	Best Actress	Maria	Nominated	
St. Louis Film Critics Association	2008	Best Actress	Changeling	Nominated	
Women Film Critics Circle	2011	Best Woman Storyteller	In the Land of Blood and Honey	Nominated	

== Humanitarian and special awards ==
Organizations	Year	Award	Result	Ref.
Church World Service Immigration and Refugee Program	2002	Humanitarian Award	Awarded	
United Nations Correspondents Association	2003	Sergio Vieira de Mello Citizen of the World Award	Awarded	
Premiere Magazine	2004	Hollywood Icon Award	Awarded	
United Nations Association of the United States of America	2005	Global Humanitarian Action Award	Awarded	
International Rescue Committee	2007	Freedom Award	Awarded	
Glamour Magazine	2007	Inspiration Award	Awarded	
Women Film Critics Circle Award	2007	Acting and Activism	Awarded	
Sarajevo Film Festival	2011	Honorary Heart of Sarajevo Award	Awarded	
Order of St Michael and St George	2011	Honorary Dame Commander (DCMG)	Appointed	
Academy of Motion Picture Arts and Sciences	2013	Jean Hersholt Humanitarian Award	Recipient	
Living Legend of Aviation	2015	Aviation Inspiration and Patriotism Award	Awarded	
Equality Forum	2015	LGBT Icon	Awarded	
Wall Street Journal Magazine	2015	Innovator Award for Entertainment and Film	Awarded	

== See also ==
- Angelina Jolie filmography
