= Angelina Jolie bibliography =

While most known for her filmography, Angelina Jolie has also authored multiple books and several articles throughout her career.

== Books ==
- Notes from My Travels: Visits with Refugees in Africa, Cambodia, Pakistan and Ecuador. Simon and Schuster. 2003. ISBN 9781416592013.
- Amnesty International; Van Bueren, Geraldine (2021). Know Your Rights and Claim Them: A Guide for Youth. Zest Books. ISBN 9781728449654.

== Articles ==
Title	Publisher	Publication Date
Somaly Mam	Time	April 29, 2009
Sharmeen Obaid-Chinoy	Time	April 17, 2012
My medical choice	The New York Times	May 14, 2013
Diary of a Surgery	The New York Times	March 24, 2015
Refugee Policy Should Be Based on Facts, Not Fear	The New York Times	February 2, 2017
Why Women Are the Key to Lasting Peace in Afghanistan	Time	April 10, 2019
What We Owe Refugees	Time	June 19, 2019
The Crisis We Face at the Border Does Not Require Us to Choose Between Security and Humanity	Time	July 31, 2019
Climate Change Is Already Displacing Millions of People. It’s Our Responsibility to Help Them	Time	September 12, 2019
Medical Advances in Women’s Health Are Important. But They’re Only Part of the Picture	Time	October 24, 2019
Angelina Jolie and Geraldine Van Bueren on Children's Rights	Time	November 20, 2019
The Cost of Inaction in Syria is Too High	Time	February 20, 2020
Why Girls Deserve Love and Respect on International Women’s Day	Time	March 8, 2020
We Can't Let COVID-19 Derail Kids' Education	Time	March 25, 2020
How COVID-19 Pandemic Puts Children at Risk	Time	April 9, 2020
Angelina Jolie Talks to Mariane Pearl About Overcoming Trauma and the Search for Truth	Time	April 14, 2020
Your Kids Don’t Want You to Be Perfect. They Just Want You to Be Honest	Time	April 24, 2020
The World’s Refugee Crisis Is Bad Now—But It’s Only Going to Get Worse	Time	June 18, 2020
Angelina Jolie, Vanessa Nakate on Elevating African Voices	Time	July 9, 2020
COVID-19 Is Undoing Fragile Gains for Women	Time	October 9, 2020
Angelina Jolie Talks to Former MI6 Chief Alex Younger	Time	October 21, 2020
Millions of Children Are in Danger. We’re Not Doing Enough to Protect Them	Time	February 18, 2021
Angelina Jolie Interviews Jasmila Zbanic on Quo Vadis, Aida?	Time	March 8, 2021
Angelina Jolie and Elif Shafak on Turkey, Women's Rights	Time	April 17, 2021
Angelina Jolie Interviews Malone Mukwende of Mind the Gap	Time	June 23, 2021
We Need to Understand the Human Cost of Burkina Faso’s Refugee Crisis	Time	July 8, 2021
The People of Afghanistan Deserve So Much Better Than This	Time	August 20, 2021
Angelina Jolie Talks to Dr. Denis Mukwege About His New Book	Time	December 1, 2021
Orion Jean Is TIME’s 2021 Kid of the Year	Time	February 9. 2022
Zahra Joya Fled the Taliban. She’s Still Telling the Stories of Afghan Women	Time	March 2, 2022
Angelina Jolie + Nadia Murad Discuss Sexual Violence and War	Time	April 15, 2022
On World Refugee Day, Let’s Commit To Finding a Better Way	Time	June 20, 2022
The World Must Not Look Away From Afghanistan’s Women	Time	August 15, 2022
Bibi Aisha Talks to Angelina Jolie About Being on TIME Cover	Time	February 28, 2023
Addressing Health Inequities in Survivors of Domestic Violence	American Journal of Nursing	July 5, 2023
Angelina Jolie Talks the Legacy of Colonialism With Nobel Laureate Abdulrazak Gurnah	Time	September 27, 2023
Imprisoned Nobel Winner Narges Mohammadi Tells Angelina Jolie Iran’s People Will Prevail	Time	November 22, 2023
In the World’s Worst Humanitarian Crisis, Acknowledge Who’s Actually Helping	Time	October 4, 2024

== Screenplays ==
Title	Distributor	Release Date
In the Land of Blood and Honey	FilmDistrict	December 23, 2011 (United States)
By the Sea	Universal Pictures	November 5, 2015 (AFI Fest); November 14, 2015 (United States)
First They Killed My Father	Netflix	February 18, 2017 (Siem Reap); September 15, 2017 (United States)
Without Blood	Vision Distribution (Italy)	September 8, 2024; April 10, 2025 (Italy)
