= Angelina Jolie filmography =

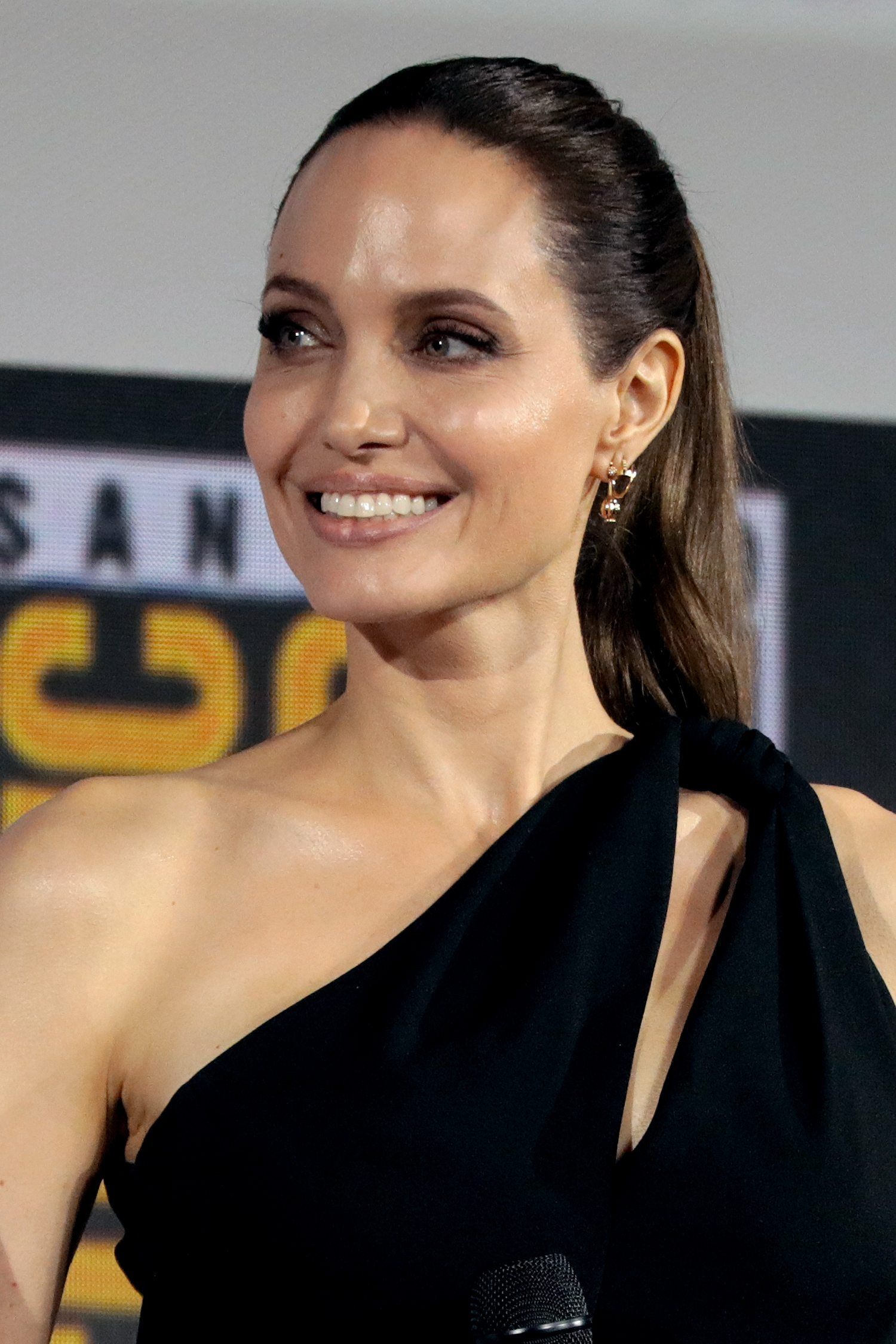
Jolie promoting Eternals at the 2019 San Diego Comic-Con

American actress Angelina Jolie made her screen debut in the comedy film Lookin' to Get Out (1982), acting alongside her father Jon Voight. Eleven years later, she appeared in her next feature, the low-budget film Cyborg 2 (1993), a commercial failure. She then starred as a teenage hacker in the science fiction thriller Hackers (1995), which went on to be a cult film despite performing poorly at the box-office. Jolie's career prospects improved with a supporting role in the made-for-television film George Wallace (1997), for which she received the Golden Globe Award for Best Supporting Actress – Television Film. She made her breakthrough the following year in HBO's television film Gia (1998). For her performance in the title role of fashion model Gia Carangi, she won the Golden Globe Award for Best Actress – Television Film.

Jolie was in Pushing Tin (1999), a critical and commercial failure; however, her next film, The Bone Collector (1999), emerged as a commercial success. In the drama Girl, Interrupted (1999), Jolie played a sociopathic mental patient, a role which won her a Golden Globe Award and an Academy Award for Best Supporting Actress. A role opposite Nicolas Cage in the heist film Gone in 60 Seconds (2000) proved to be her highest-grossing to that point. Jolie achieved worldwide recognition as the eponymous archaeologist in Lara Croft: Tomb Raider (2001), an action film based on the Tomb Raider video game series. Despite negative reviews, the film had the biggest opening weekend for a film featuring an action heroine. This was followed by roles in two box-office failures—the erotic thriller Original Sin (2001) and the romantic comedy Life or Something Like It (2002). Jolie reprised the role of Lara Croft in the sequel Lara Croft: Tomb Raider – The Cradle of Life (2003).

In 2004, Jolie lent her voice to the animated feature Shark Tale, followed by the role of an assassin in the commercially successful action comedy Mr. & Mrs. Smith (2005), opposite Brad Pitt. She then portrayed Mariane Pearl in the drama A Mighty Heart (2007), and lent her voice to the animated film Kung Fu Panda (2008). The action thriller Wanted (2008), which saw her in a supporting role, proved to be a commercial success. Her next appearance was as Christine Collins in the drama Changeling (2008), which earned her an Academy Award for Best Actress nomination. This was followed by lead roles in two of 2010's top-grossing thrillers—Salt and The Tourist. In 2011, she directed the romantic drama In the Land of Blood and Honey, which depicted a love story set during the Bosnian War, and appeared in the animation sequel Kung Fu Panda 2. Jolie's biggest commercial success, as of 2014, came with the dark fantasy film Maleficent (2014), which grossed over $758 million worldwide, and starred her in the eponymous role. Her subsequent directorial ventures were the war dramas Unbroken (2014) and First They Killed My Father (2017).

== Acting credits ==
Key
†	Denotes films that have not yet been released

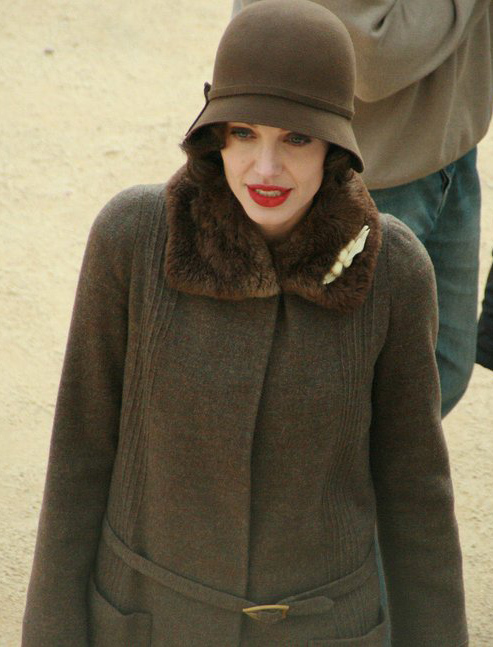
Jolie on the set of Changeling

=== Film ===
Year	Title	Role	Notes	Ref.
1982	Lookin' to Get Out	Tosh Kovac	Credited as Angelina Jolie Voight	
1993	Cyborg 2	Casella "Cash" Reese	Direct-to-video	
1993	Angela & Viril	Angela	Short film	
1993	Alice & Viril	Alice	Short film	
1995	Hackers	Kate Libby / "Acid Burn"		
1995	Without Evidence	Jodie Swearingen		
1996	Love Is All There Is	Gina Malacici		
1996	Mojave Moon	Ellie Rigby		
1996	Foxfire	Legs Sadovsky		
1997	Playing God	Claire		
1998	Hell's Kitchen	Gloria McNeary		
1998	Playing by Heart	Joan		
1999	Pushing Tin	Mary Bell		
1999	The Bone Collector	Amelia Donaghy		
1999	Girl, Interrupted	Lisa Rowe		
2000	Gone in 60 Seconds	Sara "Sway" Wayland		
2001	Lara Croft: Tomb Raider	Lara Croft		
2001	Original Sin	Julia Russell		
2002	Life or Something Like It	Lanie Kerrigan		
2003	Lara Croft: Tomb Raider – The Cradle of Life	Lara Croft		
2003	Beyond Borders	Sarah Jordan		
2004	Taking Lives	Illeana Scott		
2004	Shark Tale	Lola	Voice	
2004	Sky Captain and the World of Tomorrow	Captain Francesca "Franky" Cook		
2004	The Fever	Revolutionary	Cameo	
2004	Alexander	Olympias		
2005	Confessions of an Action Star	Herself	Cameo	
2005	Mr. & Mrs. Smith	Jane Smith		
2006	The Good Shepherd	Margaret "Clover" Russell Wilson		
2007	A Mighty Heart	Mariane Pearl		
2007	Beowulf	Grendel's mother	Voice and motion-capture	
2008	Kung Fu Panda	Tigress	Voice	
2008	Wanted	Fox		
2008	Changeling	Christine Collins		
2010	Salt	Evelyn Salt		
2010	The Tourist	Elise Clifton-Ward		
2011	Kung Fu Panda 2	Tigress	Voice	
2011	Kung Fu Panda: Secrets of the Masters	Tigress	Voice; short film	
2014	Maleficent	Maleficent		
2015	By the Sea	Vanessa	Credited as Angelina Jolie Pitt	
2016	Kung Fu Panda 3	Tigress	Voice	
2019	Maleficent: Mistress of Evil	Maleficent		
2020	Come Away	Rose Littleton		
2020	The One and Only Ivan	Stella	Voice	
2021	Those Who Wish Me Dead	Hannah Faber		
2021	Eternals	Thena		
2024	Maria	Maria Callas		
2025	Couture	Maxine Walker		
TBA	Anxious People †	Zara	Post-production	
TBA	Sunny †	TBA	Filming	

=== Television ===
Year	Title	Role	Notes	Ref.
1997	True Women	Georgia Lawshe Woods	Television film	
1997	George Wallace	Cornelia Wallace	Television film	
1998	Gia	Gia Carangi	Television film	
2010	Kung Fu Panda Holiday	Master Tigress	Voice; television special	

=== Video games ===
Year	Title	Role	Notes	Ref.
2004	The Flying Legion Air Combat Challenge	Captain Francesca "Franky" Cook	Archive footage	

=== Music videos ===
Year	Title	Artist	Album	Ref.
1991	"Alta marea (Don't Dream It's Over)"	Antonello Venditti	Benvenuti in paradiso	
1991	"Stand by My Woman"	Lenny Kravitz	Mama Said	
1992	"Wonderin"	Widespread Panic	Everyday	
1993	"It's About Time"	The Lemonheads	Come On Feel the Lemonheads	
1993	"Rock and Roll Dreams Come Through"	Meat Loaf	Bat Out of Hell II: Back into Hell	
1997	"Anybody Seen My Baby?"	The Rolling Stones	Bridges to Babylon	
2003	"Did My Time"	Korn	Take a Look in the Mirror	

== Filmmaking credits ==
Table displaying films directed and/or produced by Clint Eastwood
Year	Film	Functioned as			Notes	Ref.
Year	Film	Director	Producer	Writer	Notes	Ref.
2005	Trudell	No	Executive	No	Documentary	
2007	A Place in Time	Yes	No	No	Documentary	
2011	In the Land of Blood and Honey	Yes	Yes	Yes		
2014	Difret	No	Executive	No		
2014	Maleficent	No	Executive	No		
2014	Unbroken	Yes	Yes	No		
2015	By the Sea	Yes	Yes	Yes		
2017	First They Killed My Father	Yes	Yes	Yes		
2017	The Breadwinner	No	Executive	No		
2019	Serendipity	No	Executive	No	Documentary	
2019	Maleficent: Mistress of Evil	No	Yes	No		
2020	The One and Only Ivan	No	Yes	No		
2024	Without Blood	Yes	Yes	Yes		
TBA	Sunny †	No	Yes	No		

== See also ==
- List of awards and nominations received by Angelina Jolie
