= Kaysen =

Kaysen is a surname of Danish and Scottish origin. Notable people with the surname include:

- Carl Kaysen (1920–2010), American economist and academic
- Gavin Kaysen (born 1979), American chef
- Susanna Kaysen (born 1948), American writer
