= Queens of the Summer Hotel =

Studio album by Aimee Mann
- Released: November 5, 2021
- Recorded: 2021
- Studio: United Recording
- Genre: Folk
- Length: 40:20
- Label: SuperEgo Records
- Producer: Paul Bryan

Aimee Mann chronology
| Mental Illness (2017) | Queens of the Summer Hotel (2021) |

Singles from Queens of the Summer Hotel
- 1. "Suicide Is Murder" Released: August 6, 2021; 2. "Burn It Out" Released: September 24, 2021; 3. "I See You" Released: October 29, 2021

Queens of the Summer Hotel is the tenth studio album by the American singer-songwriter Aimee Mann, released on November 5, 2021, by SuperEgo Records. It was inspired by Susanna Kaysen's 1993 memoir Girl, Interrupted, about Kaysen's experience in McLean Hospital in the 1960s. It features classical orchestration, with piano, strings, and woodwinds.

Mann started work on the album in 2018, when she was commissioned to write songs for a musical adaptation of Girl, Interrupted. After the musical was postponed by the COVID-19 pandemic, Mann released the songs as an album. The title came from an Anne Sexton poem inspired by Sexton's stay at McLean Hospital.

The album received generally favorable reviews. It holds a score of 77 out of 100 on Metacritic. Critics praised its contemplative orchestration and Mann's performance. The Girl, Interrupted musical opened in 2026 in New York City.

== Writing ==
Mann started work on Queens of the Summer Hotel in 2018, when she was commissioned to write songs for a stage adaptation of Susanna Kaysen's 1993 memoir Girl, Interrupted. The memoir describes Kaysen's time at McLean Hospital, a psychiatric hospital in Belmont, Massachusetts. The musical was to be produced by Barbara Broccoli and Frederick Zollo, but was postponed by the COVID-19 pandemic. The album title was inspired by an Anne Sexton poem from her book To Bedlam and Part Way Back, which was inspired by her experience at McLean Hospital.

Mann spoke to Rolling Stone about the inspiration behind the first single, "Suicide Is Murder", explaining that the song grew from personal experience with people who had died by suicide and the guilt that survivors carry. She described the phrase "suicide is murder" as capturing the devastating aftermath for those left behind, who she said would spend the rest of their lives wondering whether they could have intervened.

== Critical reception ==
Professional ratings
Aggregate scores
| Source | Rating |
|---|---|
| Metacritic | 77/100 |
Review scores
| Source | Rating |
| AllMusic | 4/5 stars |
| The A.V. Club | B |
| Riff | 6/10 |

AllMusic rated the album 4 out of 5 stars, with critic Stephen Thomas Erlewine noting that despite its contemplative nature the album looks outward, and praising the combination of airy arrangements and the warmth of Mann's performance as wistfully hopeful, a record that offers comfort during uncertain times. The site also featured this as one of the best albums of 2021. Kirsten Lambert from the Chicago Reader wrote, "Mann probes the depths of human experience, addressing some grim subject matter—including suicide, self-immolation, and incest." She concluded that the album "isn't a quick (or easy) listen. This one will stay with you for a while." Alex McLevy of The A.V. Club called it "an unusual (and unusually rewarding) project," writing, "It doesn't have the instant-classic pop of some of her earlier material, but as a more somber, measured collection of music (none of the jangly pop-rock of Charmer to be found here), it's a winner."

== Track listing ==
All tracks are written by Aimee Mann.

Queens of the Summer Hotel track listing
| No. | Title | Length |
|---|---|---|
| 1. | "You Fall" | 3:35 |
| 2. | "Robert Lowell and Sylvia Plath" | 3:13 |
| 3. | "Give Me Fifteen" | 2:42 |
| 4. | "At the Frick Museum" | 3:03 |
| 5. | "Home by Now" | 1:35 |
| 6. | "Checks" | 0:34 |
| 7. | "Little Chameleon" | 1:44 |
| 8. | "You Don't Have the Room" | 4:06 |
| 9. | "Suicide Is Murder" | 4:14 |
| 10. | "You Could Have Been a Roosevelt" | 2:07 |
| 11. | "Burn It Out" | 2:57 |
| 12. | "In Mexico" | 3:33 |
| 13. | "Check (reprise)" | 0:57 |
| 14. | "You're Lost" | 2:16 |
| 15. | "I See You" | 3:36 |
| Total length: | | 40:20 |

== Personnel ==
Credits for Queens of the Summer Hotel adapted from Tidal.

=== Musicians ===
- Aimee Mann – vocals, acoustic guitar
- Paul Bryan – background vocals, woodwind, strings
- Anna Butterss – bass guitar
- Richard Dodd – cello
- Phillip O'Connor – clarinet
- Sara Andon – flute, alto flute, piccolo
- Danielle Ondarza – horn
- Maya Barrera – oboe
- Jay Bellerose – percussion, trap kit
- Jamie Edwards – piano
- Aidan Lombard – trumpet
- Leah Katz – viola
- Daphne Chan – violin

=== Technical ===
- Paul Bryan – production, arrangement, conduction
- Ryan Freeland – engineering, mixing
- Jens Wortmann – cover collage
- Scott Silva – cover photo
- Ed Sherman – design
- Karen Malluk – production coordination

== Charts ==
Chart performance for Queens of the Summer Hotel
| Chart (2021) | Peak position |
|---|---|
| Scottish Albums (Official Charts) | 53 |
| UK Americana Albums (Official Charts) | 4 |
| UK Independent Albums (Official Charts) | 18 |
| US Top Album Sales (Billboard) | 81 |
