= Fallon Goodman =

Fallon Goodman is an Italian-American clinical psychologist and psychology assistant professor at George Washington University.

== Education ==
Goodman completed her undergraduate studies at the University of Maryland, earning a Bachelors degree in Psychology and Family Science in 2012, before continuing her education further, to earn both her Masters and PhD at George Mason University in 2014 and 2019, respectively.

== Career ==
As part of her postdoctoral training, Goodman attended the McLean Hospital, where she worked as a medical intern from 2018 to 2019.

Goodman then began teaching and conducting research at the University of South Florida, where she worked as an assistant professor in the Department of Psychology from 2019 to 2022. While at the University of South Florida, Goodman also served as the director of the Emotion and Resilience Lab, focusing primarily on research relating to the formation of social relationships and emotional resilience.

As of 2022, Goodman is now at George Washington University, continuing her work as an assistant professor in the Department of Psychological and Brain Sciences. Goodman also continues to direct another branch of the Emotion and Resilience Laboratory, continuing with the research goals of her previous laboratory.

== Social media ==
=== TEDxUSF ===
In September 2021, Goodman delivered a Ted Talk, as an assistant professor in collaboration with the University of South Florida, focusing on her research on social anxiety.

=== Other media ===
Goodman has also been featured in other news outlets and podcasts, primarily discussing topics such as the COVID-19 pandemic's impact on mental health, effective practices for building and maintaining health and some of her research.

== Bibliography ==
=== Select publications ===
- Goodman, F. R., Brown, B. A., Silva, G. M., Bradford, D. E., Tennen, H., & Kashdan, T. B. (2022). "Motives and Consequences of Alcohol Use in People With Social Anxiety Disorder: A Daily Diary Study". Behavior Therapy, 53(4), 600–613. https://doi.org/10.1016/j.beth.2022.01.005
- Goodman, F. R., Daniel, K. E., Eldesouky, L., Brown, B. A., & Kneeland, E. T. (2021). "How do people with social anxiety disorder manage daily stressors? Deconstructing emotion regulation flexibility in daily life". Journal of Affective Disorders Reports, 6, 100210. https://doi.org/10.1016/j.jadr.2021.100210
- Doorley, J. D., Goodman, F. R., Disabato, D. J., Kashdan, T. B., Weinstein, J. S., & Shackman, A. J. (2020). "The Momentary Benefits of Positive Events for Individuals with Elevated Social Anxiety". Emotion. https://doi.org/10.1037/emo0000725
- Goodman, F. R., Kelso, K. C., Wiernik, B. M., & Kashdan, T. B. (2021). "Social Comparisons and Social Anxiety in Daily Life: An Experience-Sampling Approach". Journal of Abnormal Psychology, 130(5), 468–489. https://doi.org/10.1037/abn0000671
- Goodman, F. R., Rum, R., Silva, G., & Kashdan, T. B. (2021). "Are people with social anxiety disorder happier alone?" Journal of Anxiety Disorders, 84, 102474. https://doi.org/10.1016/j.janxdis.2021.102474
- Goodman, F. R., Kashdan, T. B., Stiksma, M. C., & Blalock, D. V. (2018). "Personal Strivings to Understand Anxiety Disorders: Social Anxiety as an Exemplar". Clinical Psychological Science, 7(2), 283–301. https://doi.org/10.1177/2167702618804778
- Goodman, F. R., Disabato, D. J., Kashdan, T. B., & Machell, K. A. (2016). "Personality Strengths as Resilience: A One-Year Multiwave Study". Journal of Personality, 85(3), 423–434. https://doi.org/10.1111/jopy.12250
- Goodman, F. R., Peckham, A., Kneeland, E. T., Choate, A. M., Daniel, K. E., Beard, C., & Thröstur Björgvinsson. (2023). "How does emotion regulation change during psychotherapy? A daily diary study of adults in a transdiagnostic partial hospitalization program". Journal of Consulting and Clinical Psychology, 91(12), 731–743. https://doi.org/10.1037/ccp0000838
- Kashdan, T. B., Goodman, F. R., McKnight, P. E., Brown, B. A., & Rum, R. (2023). "Purpose in Life: A Resolution on the Definition, Conceptual Model, and Optimal Measurement". American Psychologist. https://doi.org/10.1037/amp0001223‌
