= Girl, Interrupted (musical) =

2026 musical

- Music: Aimee Mann
- Lyrics: Aimee Mann
- Book: Martyna Majok
- Basis: Memoir Girl, Interrupted by Susanna Kaysen
- Premiere: May 13, 2026: Martinson Hall, New York City
- Productions: 2026 Off-Broadway

Girl, Interrupted is a 2026 musical based on the 1993 memoir Girl, Interrupted by Susanna Kaysen, about Kaysen's experience in a psychiatric hospital in the 1960s. It was directed by Jo Bonney, written by Martyna Majok and staged by the Public Theater, with songs by Aimee Mann.

After production was postponed by the COVID-19 pandemic, Mann released the songs as the 2021 album Queens of the Summer Hotel. After previews in New York City on May 13, 2026, Girl, Interrupted opened on June 4.

== Premise ==
Girl, Interrupted is based on the 1993 memoir Girl, Interrupted by Susanna Kaysen, about Kaysen's experience in a psychiatric hospital in the 1960s. It focuses on Susanna and four other female patients: Tori, an amphetamine addict; Daisy, an abuse victim with obsessive–compulsive disorder; Polly (Sally Shaw), a schizophrenic burn victim; and Lisa (King Princess), a sexually driven sociopath. It switches between the perspectives of the older and younger Susanna (played by Juliana Canfield).

== Cast and characters ==
Character	Actor
Valerie	Ta'Rea Campbell
Tori	Gabi Campo
Susanna	Juliana Canfield
The Male Presence	Manoel Felciano
Lisa	King Princess
Grace	Mia Pak
Daisy	Katherine Reis
Polly	Sally Shaw
Dr. Wick	Emily Skinner
Judy	Lauren Jeanne Thomas

== Production ==
Girl, Interrupted is staged by the off-Broadway theater company the Public Theater. The producer Angelica Zollo had read Girl, Interrupted as a teenager and suggested the adaptation to her mother, the producer Barbara Broccoli. Zollo enlisted the singer-songwriter Aimee Mann to write the songs. The producers approached Martyna Majok to write the script in 2017 after seeing her play Cost of Living. Jo Bonney, who also directed Cost of Living, is the director. Kaysen was not involved in the production. According to Majok, Kaysen "really wanted us to make it our own". When the production was postponed by the COVID-19 pandemic, Mann released the songs as the 2021 album Queens of the Summer Hotel. Mann was not involved in the final production.

== Reception ==
In Vulture, Jackson McHenry wrote that Mann's songs were "excellent at rendering a song as single-perspective interior monologue", but did not serve the musical's dramatic needs. He suggested this was due to Mann's exit from the production after it was delayed by the pandemic, and that "you can feel Majok and Bonney trying to shape the show around material that was frozen too early in the process". He felt that the script became "flatter and broader" towards the end, and concluded that the musical had potential for improvement with rewriting and editing.

In The New York Times, Helen Shaw wrote that Mann's songs were beautiful but did not suit a narrative. She concluded that it was "a murky production with too much stillness at its center". In The Guardian, Richard Lawson gave Girl, Interrupted three out of five, calling it "a sturdy showcase for Mann's gorgeous, shimmering-sad compositions, but perhaps a less successful conduit for Kaysen's arguments ... This is more 'music with a play attached' than the other way around".
