= David H. Rosmarin =

American psychologist

David H. Rosmarin is an American psychologist who specializes in anxiety. He is an associate professor at Harvard Medical School and the founder of Center for Anxiety, which he directs. Rosmarin is also an author, and has worked as McLean Hospital's director of spirituality and mental health.

In 2011, Rosmarin led a study that found a correlation between spirituality and a person's anxiety-level and tolerance of uncertainty.

== Select academic works ==
- Handbook of spirituality/religion and mental health, 2nd edition. New York: Elsevier Press.
- Spiritual psychotherapy for inpatient, residential, and intensive treatment (SPIRIT).
- Religious vs. conventional cognitive-behavioral therapy for major depression in persons with chronic medical illness.
- Interest in spiritually-integrated psychotherapy among acute psychiatric patients.
- Spiritual struggle and affective symptoms among geriatric mood disordered patients.
- Do religious patients need religious psychotherapists?
- Effectiveness of cognitive behavioral therapy for anxiety and depression among Orthodox Jews.
