= John Bartlett (minister) =

John Bartlett (1784–1849) was a minister and co-founder of McLean Hospital and Massachusetts General Hospital, two of the first hospitals in the United States.

John Bartlett was born in Concord, Massachusetts, in 1784 as the fourth of twelve children and as a youth was greatly influenced by his local pastor, Dr. Ripley. After working with a relative in commerce in Maine, Bartlett returned to Massachusetts and graduated from Harvard College in 1805. Bartlett then studied theology for two years in Cambridge and then became chaplain of the Boston Almshouse, which cared for poor residents of Boston. Bartlett remained as a chaplain from 1807 to 1811 and during this period studied theology further under William Ellery Channing. Bartlett also studied medicine, although he never intended to be practicing physician, but thought the education useful in his work with the impoverished. After observing the conditions of the poor at the Almshouse, Bartlett visited the hospitals in New York and Philadelphia and researched the newest medical methods. Bartlett then organized two meetings of prominent physicians and wealthy benefactors, one meeting resulted in the founding of McLean Insane Hospital and the other resulted in the creation of Massachusetts General Hospital. In 1811 Bartlett was ordained as pastor of the Second Congregational Church in Marblehead, Massachusetts, where he held to a Unitarian theology. Also in 1811, Bartlett married, Rebecca Dublois, daughter of George and Sarah Dublois, and they eventually had six children together. He was an active member of the Marblehead Humane Society and Freemasons. Bartlett died in 1849 at age sixty-five after several personal tragedies.
