= Ruth Butler =

American art historian (1931–2024)

- Born: October 7, 1931; Buffalo, New York, U.S.
- Died: November 28, 2024 (aged 93); Cambridge, Massachusetts, U.S.
- Spouse: Carl Kaysen (m. 1994; died 2010)

Academic background
- Education: Western Reserve University; Cleveland Institute of Art; New York University Institute of Fine Arts
- Doctoral advisor: H. W. Janson

Academic work
- Discipline: Art history
- Institutions: University of Maryland, College Park; University of Massachusetts Boston

Ruth Butler (October 7, 1931 – November 28, 2024) was an American art historian and academic who specialized in 19th-century French sculpture and the roles of artists' models and collaborators. She taught at the University of Maryland, College Park and the University of Massachusetts Boston, and authored works on Auguste Rodin and the lives of women associated with artists of the era.

== Early life and education ==
Butler was born on October 7, 1931, in Buffalo, New York, to Hermine Hansen and George Butler. She grew up in Buffalo, starting art lessons at age five, and later in Decatur, Illinois. Her father worked as a purchasing agent for an automobile parts manufacturer and also made yard signs and other objects at home.

Butler earned a B.A. in 1953 from Western Reserve University and the Cleveland Institute of Art. She also worked part-time at the institute. She then attended the New York University Institute of Fine Arts, where she studied under H. W. Janson, who encouraged her to pursue studies in 19th-century sculpture. In 1957, she received a Fulbright scholarship to study in Paris, conducting research on Auguste Rodin's early works and their relationship to earlier sculptors. She completed her doctorate in 1966.

== Career ==
Butler began her academic career as an assistant professor of art history at the University of Maryland, College Park from 1969 to 1972. She later joined the University of Massachusetts Boston, where she served as associate professor starting in 1973 and chaired the art department from 1976 to 1980. She retired in 1992 as professor emerita.

Her research primarily centered on 19th-century French sculpture. Butler was the author, co-author and editor of a number of books and catalogues including Western Sculpture: Definitions of man (1975), Rodin in perspective (1980), Rodin’s monument to Victor Hugo (1988) and European sculpture of the nineteenth century (2000). In 1985, she was awarded a Guggenheim Fellowship. She is best known for her 1993 publication Rodin: The Shape of Genius, a biography of Auguste Rodin that incorporated extensive archival research from the Musée Rodin. The book examined the sculptor's career and his broader historical and cultural context. It was a finalist in the biography section of the Los Angeles Times Book Prize in 1994, and a winner of the George Wittenborn Memorial Book Award of the same year.

In 2008, Butler published Hidden in the Shadow of the Master: The Model-Wives of Cézanne, Monet, and Rodin. This work focused on the lives of Marie-Hortense Fiquet, Camille Doncieux, and Rose Beuret, examining their relationships with Paul Cézanne, Claude Monet, and Rodin, respectively. The book explored their roles as models and collaborators.

After retiring, Butler created a scholarship fund at the University of Massachusetts Boston to support art students studying abroad.

== Personal life ==
Butler's first marriage, to biologist Maurizio Mirolli, ended in divorce. In 1994, she married Carl Kaysen, an economist and former deputy national security adviser who died in 2010.

Butler died on November 28, 2024, in Cambridge, Massachusetts, following a short illness.
