= Sunny (upcoming film) =

- Directed by: Eva Sørhaug
- Screenplay by: William Day Frank
- Story by: Eva Sørhaug; William Day Frank
- Produced by: Angelina Jolie; Nathan Klingher; Mark Fasano; Jeffrey Greenstein
- Starring: Angelina Jolie; Charlie Plummer; Method Man; Mary Stuart Masterson
- Production companies: Gramercy Park Media; A Higher Standard; Nickel City Pictures
- Country: United States
- Language: English

Sunny is an upcoming American crime thriller film directed by Eva Sørhaug and starring Angelina Jolie, Charlie Plummer, Method Man, and Mary Stuart Masterson.

== Premise ==
A female gangster who fights to protect her sons and herself from an abusive drug kingpin, but when a devastating event occurs, she only has a matter of hours to plot their permanent escape.

== Cast ==
- Angelina Jolie
- Charlie Plummer
- Method Man as Ruskin
- Mary Stuart Masterson
- Jason Schmidt
- John Cenatiempo as Danny

== Production ==
In October 2017, it was announced that Eva Sørhaug would be directing a crime thriller film from a script by William Day Frank and Sharon Stone in the lead role. By December 2025, Stone had exited the project, with Angelina Jolie leading the cast. Principal photography began that month. The cast also includes Charlie Plummer. In January 2026, Method Man joined the cast as Ruskin, alongside Jason Schmidt and Mary Stuart Masterson.
