= Girl, Interrupted (film) =

1999 film by James Mangold

- Theatrical release poster
- Directed by: James Mangold
- Screenplay by: James Mangold; Lisa Loomer; Anna Hamilton Phelan
- Based on: Girl, Interrupted by Susanna Kaysen
- Produced by: Douglas Wick; Cathy Konrad
- Starring: Winona Ryder; Angelina Jolie; Clea DuVall; Brittany Murphy; Elisabeth Moss; Jared Leto; Jeffrey Tambor; Vanessa Redgrave; Whoopi Goldberg
- Cinematography: Jack Green
- Edited by: Kevin Tent
- Music by: Mychael Danna
- Production companies: Columbia Pictures; Red Wagon Entertainment
- Distributed by: Sony Pictures Releasing
- Release date: December 21, 1999 (United States)
- Running time: 127 minutes
- Country: United States
- Language: English
- Budget: $24 million
- Box office: $48.3 million

Girl, Interrupted is a 1999 American biographical drama film directed by James Mangold and written by Mangold, Lisa Loomer and Anna Hamilton Phelan, based on the 1993 memoir of the same name by Susanna Kaysen. The film stars Winona Ryder, Angelina Jolie, Clea DuVall, Brittany Murphy, Elisabeth Moss, Jared Leto, Angela Bettis, Jeffrey Tambor, Vanessa Redgrave, and Whoopi Goldberg. Its plot follows a young woman who spends 18 months institutionalized at a psychiatric hospital following a suicide attempt.

Girl, Interrupted was theatrically released in the United States on December 21, 1999, and grossed $48 million worldwide. The film received mixed reviews, but the performances of Ryder, Jolie and Murphy were praised; Jolie won numerous awards including the Academy Award for Best Supporting Actress, the Critics' Choice Movie Award for Best Supporting Actress, the Golden Globe Award for Best Supporting Actress – Motion Picture and the Screen Actors Guild Award for Outstanding Performance by a Female Actor in a Supporting Role.

== Plot ==
In 1967 in New England, aimless eighteen-year-old Susanna Kaysen has an acute psychiatric episode and overdoses on aspirin and alcohol. Against her wishes, she is checked into Claymoore, a psychiatric hospital. In the psychiatric ward, Susanna befriends Georgina Tuskin, a pathological liar and Susanna's roommate; Polly "Torch" Clark, a young teen girl who was burnt in a sixth-grade fire (although Georgina lies that she set herself on fire); Cynthia Crowley, who has severe depression; Daisy Randone, who self-harms and has obsessive–compulsive disorder; and Janet Webber, a sardonic woman with anorexia nervosa. Susanna is particularly drawn to the sociopath Lisa Rowe, who is rebellious but charismatic and encourages Susanna to stop taking her medication and resist therapy.

Lisa helps the girls sneak around at night in the hospital's underground tunnels and continuously provokes them and the staff, including the stern head nurse, Valerie Owens. Through regular therapy sessions with Dr. Melvin Potts, Susanna learns she has borderline personality disorder, a fact Dr. Potts initially conceals from her. On a rare supervised group outing celebrating Daisy's impending discharge, the women visit an ice cream parlor. Susanna is confronted by Barbara Gilcrest, the wife of an English instructor with whom she had an affair, and their daughter, Bonnie. Barbara publicly chastises Susanna for sleeping with her husband; coming to Susanna's defense, Lisa insultingly berates Barbara, and the other girls mock Bonnie before they both leave, humiliated. This endears Lisa to Susanna even more, though Valerie reprimands Lisa.

In addition to her affair with Dr. Gilcrest, Susanna has a casual relationship with Toby, a young man who has been drafted to serve in the Vietnam War. He visits Susanna and begs her to run away with him to Canada. Susanna declines, citing her friendship with the other patients. The same night, Polly has a breakdown and is placed in isolation. Susanna and Lisa drug the night watch nurse with a sedative and attempt to comfort Polly by singing to her. Susanna also makes out with John, one of the hospital orderlies, who has a crush on her. When Valerie finds the group sleeping in the hallway in the morning, she punishes the two women, particularly Lisa, who is subjected to electroconvulsive therapy followed by solitary confinement.

Later that night, Lisa manages to break out of confinement and convinces Susanna to escape with her. The women hitchhike to Daisy's newly rented apartment, supplied by her sexually abusive father, and bribe her with Valium to spend the night. Daisy, insistent she has been cured of her illness, is confronted by Lisa when she discovers Daisy has been cutting herself. Lisa taunts and mocks Daisy, accusing her of enjoying the incestuous sexual abuse she has long suffered from her father. The next morning, Susanna finds Daisy dead in her bathroom, having slashed her own wrists and hanged herself. Susanna is appalled when Lisa searches Daisy's room and body for cash. Realizing she does not want to become like Lisa, Susanna calls for an ambulance, takes Daisy's kitten, and returns to Claymoore while Lisa flees to Florida.

Upon returning to the hospital, Susanna occupies herself with painting and writing, and cooperates with her therapy, including regular sessions with the hospital's head psychologist, Dr. Sonia Wick. Before Susanna is released, Lisa is apprehended and returned to Claymoore. She steals Susanna's diary one night and reads some of the entries to Georgina and Polly in the tunnels, attempting to turn them against Susanna. After reading an entry in which Susanna feels sympathy for Lisa being a cold, dark person, Lisa attacks Susanna and chases her through the tunnels. A furious Susanna confronts Lisa, loudly calls her dead inside, and calls her out for her abusive behaviors, needing Claymoore to feel alive, for being afraid of the world, and for being uncaringly unempathetic. Lisa finally breaks down and contemplates suicide, though Georgina manages to dissuade her. Before Susanna is released the next day, she goes to visit Lisa, now in solitary confinement and restrained to a bed. The two reconcile, and Lisa insists she is not actually heartless. They part on good terms, and Susanna bids farewell to everyone, apologizing to Georgina and Polly for what was written about them in her journal, with both women accepting the apology before Susanna departs.

== Cast ==
- Winona Ryder as Susanna Kaysen, the protagonist. Kaysen was 18 years old when diagnosed with borderline personality disorder.
- Angelina Jolie as Lisa Rowe, diagnosed as a sociopath. Charismatic, manipulative, rebellious and abusive, she has been in the institution since she was twelve, and has escaped several times over her eight years there, but is always caught and brought back eventually. She is looked up to by the other patients and forms a close bond with Susanna.
- Clea DuVall as Georgina Tuskin, a pathological liar. She is Susanna's seventeen-year-old roommate and her closest friend next to Lisa in the institution. Susanna confides in her about life and Georgina informs Susanna about the other girls there.
- Brittany Murphy as Daisy Randone, a sexually abused eighteen-year-old girl with OCD who self-harms and is addicted to laxatives. She keeps and hides the carcasses of the cooked chicken that her father brings her in her room. She later kills herself by hanging.
- Elisabeth Moss as Polly "Torch" Clark, a burn victim who has schizophrenia. She is sixteen years old, and is very childlike and easily upset. Georgina informs Susanna that Polly was admitted to Claymoore after her parents told her that she would have to give up her puppy because of her allergies to it, and in response she poured gasoline on the affected area and set it alight, leaving her face horribly scarred. It is later revealed in Polly's file that she was the victim of a house fire.
- Jared Leto as Tobias Jacobs, Susanna's ex-boyfriend who plans to escape to Canada after being drafted into the military.
- Jeffrey Tambor as Dr. Melvin Potts
- Travis Fine as John, an orderly who is smitten with Susanna. He is later sent to work at the men's ward after he and Susanna kiss and fall asleep together.
- Jillian Armenante as Cynthia Crowley, a severe depressive. She claims that she is a sociopath like Lisa, but Lisa denies the claim and states that she is a "dyke". She is twenty-two and is easily amused.
- Angela Bettis as Janet Webber, an anorexic. Like Lisa, she is abrasive and seemingly aloof, but is also easily irritated or upset. She is twenty years old.
- Vanessa Redgrave as Dr. Sonia Wick, the head psychologist of the hospital.
- Whoopi Goldberg as Valerie Owens, the stern but caring head nurse who oversees the hospital.
- Bruce Altman as Professor Gilchrest
- Mary Kay Place as Mrs. Gilchrest

In addition, Ray Baker portrays Carl Kaysen, Susanna's father, while Joanna Kerns portrays Annette, Susanna's mother.

== Production ==
=== Development ===
In June 1993, Columbia Pictures fought off a number of other studios to buy the film rights to Susanna Kaysen's memoir. Winona Ryder, who had also attempted to buy the film rights, ultimately partnered with producer Douglas Wick to develop the project as a star vehicle. The film was then stuck in development hell for five years, with three different scripts written but none satisfying Ryder and Wick, their reasoning being that Kaysen's book struggled to translate to film. Ryder approached James Mangold to direct, after seeing his film debut Heavy. Ryder, Wick and Mangold settled on a final shooting script in mid-1998, with Columbia pushing back production on the film until early 1999 for Ryder to shoot their horror film Lost Souls.

=== Casting ===
Because of the volume of strong female characters in the film, a number of young actresses sought parts in it. Reese Witherspoon, Christina Ricci, Katie Holmes, Gretchen Mol, Kate Hudson, Alicia Witt, Sarah Polley, and Rose McGowan all auditioned for unspecified roles. "It's the only decent thing out there that doesn't involve taking your clothes off," McGowan said in 1998. Brittany Murphy was announced as part of the cast in November. Mangold also met with Courtney Love to discuss the role of Lisa as well as Alanis Morissette for a role. Parker Posey turned down the role of Lisa, while Leelee Sobieski signed on to play Daisy but dropped out weeks before filming began after receiving an offer to star in Joan of Arc.

=== Filming ===
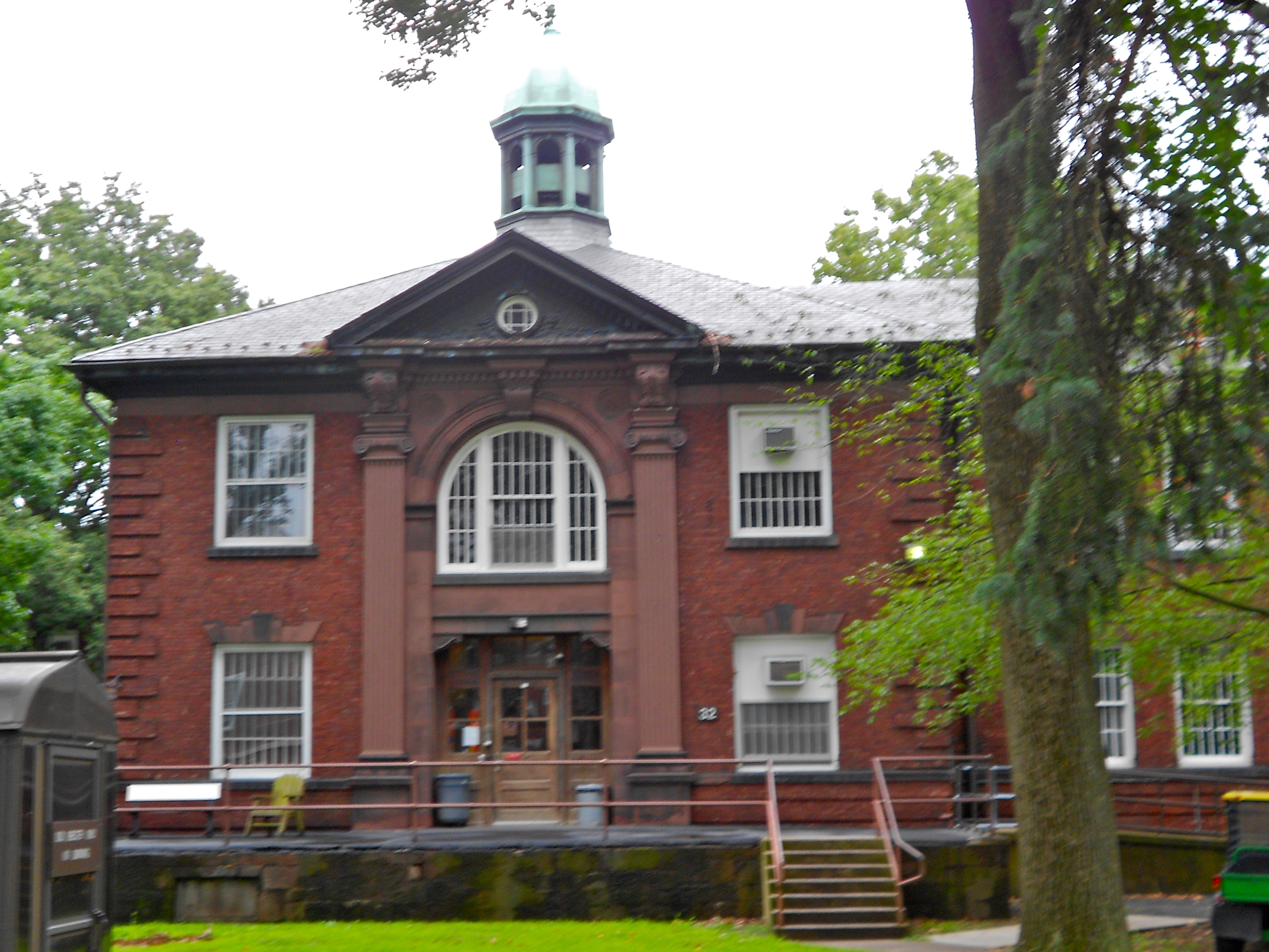
Filming primarily took place at Harrisburg State Hospital in Pennsylvania

Filming took place primarily in Mechanicsburg, Pennsylvania, as well as in Harrisburg State Hospital in Harrisburg, Pennsylvania, from January to April 1999. Mechanicsburg was chosen for its old-fashioned appearance and its old-style drugstore simply titled "Drugs", all of which gave the film its time-dated appearance. A scene in the trailer shows a van traveling towards downtown Harrisburg over the State Street Bridge, where the Capitol building is clearly visible. Scenes later deleted were also filmed at Reading's Public Museum.

== Reception and legacy ==
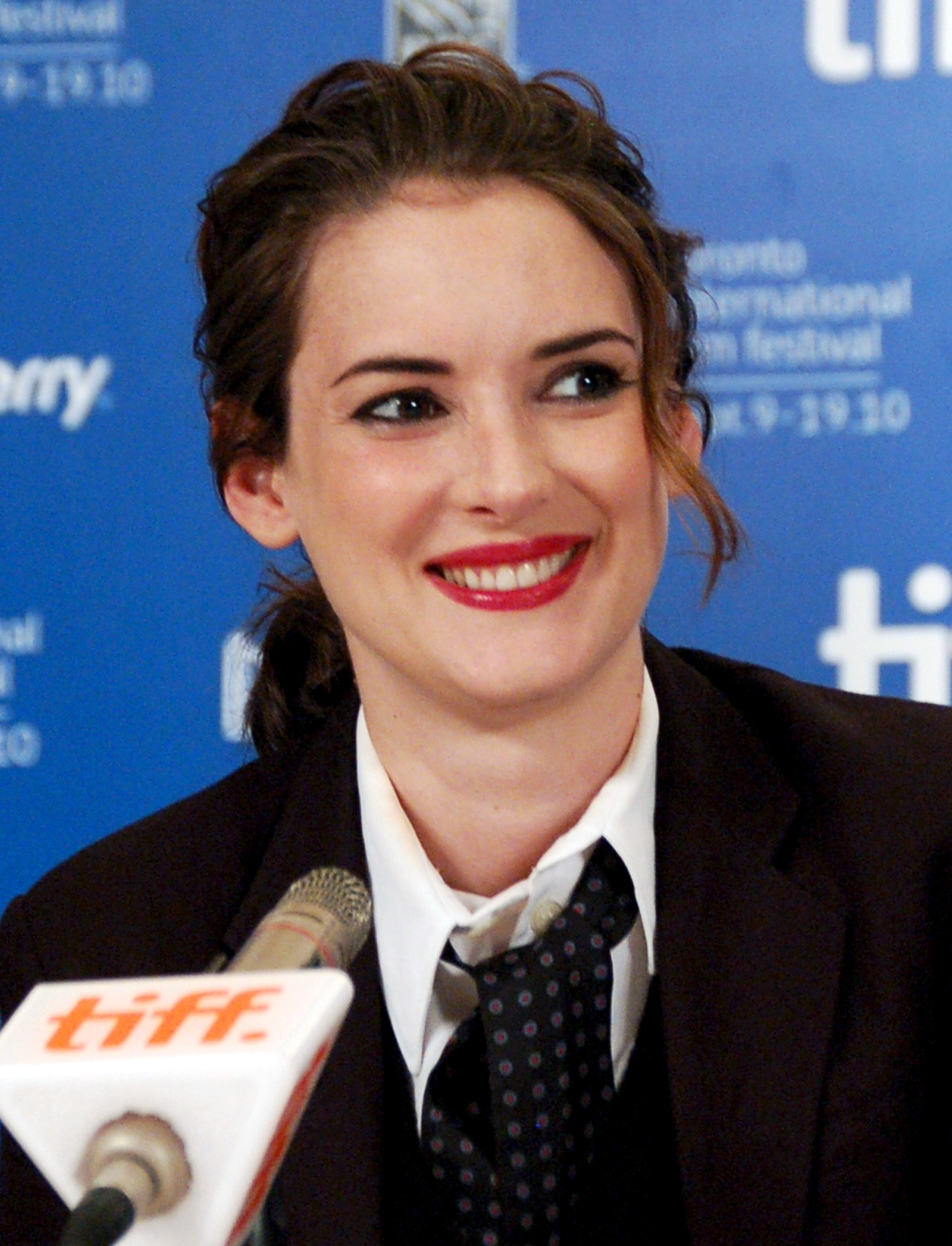
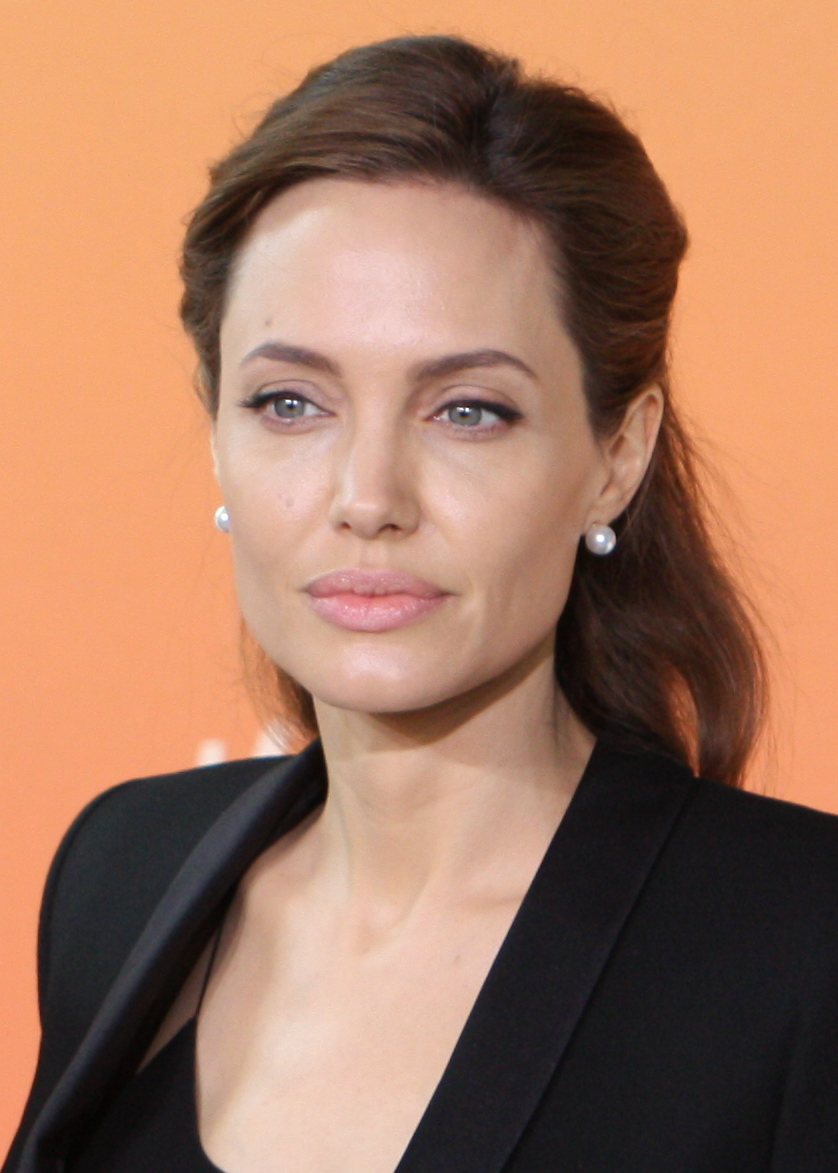
The performances of Winona Ryder and Angelina Jolie were praised, and Jolie earned the Academy Award for Best Supporting Actress.

As of 2022, the film holds a rating of 53% on the review aggregator website Rotten Tomatoes, based on 113 reviews, with an average rating of 6.4/10. The site's consensus states: "Angelina Jolie gives an intense performance, but overall Girl, Interrupted suffers from thin, predictable plotting that fails to capture the power of its source material." The film also has a rating of 51 on Metacritic, based 32 reviews, indicating "mixed or average" reviews. Audiences polled by CinemaScore gave the film an average grade of "B" on an A+ to F scale.

Writing for The New York Times, Stephen Holden wrote: "Girl, Interrupted is a small, intense period piece with a hardheaded tough-love attitude toward lazy, self-indulgent little girls flirting with madness: You can drive yourself crazy, or you can get over it. The choice is yours." Tom Coates from the BBC wrote: "Girl, Interrupted is a decent adaptation of [Kaysen's] memoir of this period, neatened up and polished for an audience more familiar with gloss than grit." Kenneth Turan of the Los Angeles Times was critical of the screenplay adaptation from the source memoir, writing that it has "a hard time resisting manufacturing obvious, standard-issue drama of the One Flew Over the Cuckoo's Nest knockoff variety," though he conceded that the performances of Ryder and Jolie help the film "stay as honest as it manages to sporadically be... Both women have connected strongly to their parts, and they ensure their characters' reality even if the dramas they are involved with don't always rise to that standard."

Paul Tatara of CNN panned the film's screenplay for containing little "self-reflection in the dialogue," adding that "Each girl is simply issued a quirk that she drags around like a ball and chain." Tatara summarized: "The good news is that writer-director James Mangold's Girl, Interrupted is one of the best films of the year. The bad news is that you have to be a hyper-sensitive 17-year-old girl to think so." Roger Ebert was critical of the film's failure to focus on the themes it presents, writing: "The film is mostly about character and behavior and although there are individual scenes of powerful acting, there doesn't seem to be a destination. That's why the conclusion is so unsatisfying: The story, having failed to provide itself with character conflicts that can be resolved with drama, turns to melodrama instead."

Charlotte O'Sullivan of the Time Out Film Guide praised Jolie's performance, but was critical of Ryder's, writing: "Does it matter that every time Jolie's offscreen the film wilts a little? Ryder should be perfect as the bright spark; her lines are sharp as a knife. There's a gap, however, between what we hear and what we see. Ryder's too wide-eyed and cutesy, and when we see her with nurse Valerie (Goldberg), we know it's only a matter of time before they start hugging." The San Francisco Chronicle's Peter Stack was unimpressed by the film, deeming it "a muddled production that misses the jarring tone of the autobiographical book by Susanna Kaysen on which it is based. The film is entertaining, but not very powerful." Jami Bernard of the New York Daily News gave the film a mixed review, awarding it two out of four stars, writing that "[Ryder] is often just a crumpled, listless figure on a bed, which, while true to the nature of depression, is not, cinematically speaking, the most arresting image," and likening the performances of Whoopi Goldberg and Vanessa Redgrave as "bordering on cameos". Kaysen accused Mangold of adding "melodramatic drivel" by inventing plot points that were not in the book (such as Lisa and Susanna running away together).

== Themes ==
=== Confusion of social nonconformity with insanity ===
Susanna wonders if her prolonged stay at Claymoore is justified. The doctor is hasty in his analysis of her and bases his diagnosis on preconceived ideas relating to sexism. Her diagnosis suggests that "normal" is as relative as insanity is, and Kaysen interrogates the Diagnostic and Statistical Manual of Mental Disorders definition of borderline personality disorder, calling it a "generalization" rather than a specific case study. She points out that while she is considered recovered from that condition, she still has the first symptom, which is "uncertainty about several life issues". As Susanna speaks with her physician, Melvin, she refers to the other patients as "fucking crazy" and insists that she does not belong with them. However, her parents and the doctor have a different perspective, and eventually she realizes that she is not much different from them after all.

=== Forced institutionalization ===
Lisa calls psychotherapy "the-rapey", which is a play on words insinuating that the therapy they are forced to undergo in the institution feels like rape (psychologically) and says the more a person divulges their secrets, the more likely they would be considered for release. However, the option of release seems oblique for people like Susanna and Lisa, who claim to have no secrets. "Although the construct of the asylum represented an immeasurable tool in the pursuit to expiate mental illness, the respect for patient autonomy appeared to have been relegated to those without mental illness". In 1973, the infamous phrase "dying with one's rights on" was coined by Darold Treffert, referring to the ultimate prioritization of patient autonomy over beneficence.

=== Representations of being a woman with mental illness ===
The emergence of women's liberation movements in the 1960s is of significance to the period in which Kaysen's memoir is set. Rights and standards were set much differently for women than they were for men. Dr. Melvin does not initially inform Susanna of her diagnosis, deeming it unnecessary for her to know. Eventually, when he informs her of the diagnosis, he cites the disorder being more common in women than in men. Subsequent studies on the linkages between mental disorders and gender since the 1960s and 1970s have identified a more even gender balance in the prevalence of mental illness as they have incorporated a wider range of disorders.

=== Isolation ===
The physical depiction of Claymoore is reminiscent of a prison. With bar-covered windows and regular room inspections to make sure the girls are not causing harm to themselves as well as not trying to escape, the girls are subject to the mercy of the ever-watchful staff. The theme of isolation is exhibited in Susanna's life as neither her parents nor her boyfriend (who quits after a few attempts) come to visit her in the institution. The theme of isolation also serves as a protective shield from the dangers of the outside world as even Lisa complains that "there's nobody to take care of you out there", and people like Torch are safe from an abusive home and drug-pushing environment.

== Accolades ==
Award ceremony	Date of ceremony	Category	Recipient(s)	Result	Ref(s)
Academy Awards	March 26, 2000	Best Supporting Actress	Angelina Jolie	Won	
Artios Awards	November 1, 2000	Best Casting in a Feature Film – Drama	Lisa Beach	Nominated	
Blockbuster Entertainment Awards	May 9, 2000	Favorite Actress – Drama	Winona Ryder	Nominated	
Blockbuster Entertainment Awards	May 9, 2000	Favorite Supporting Actress – Drama	Angelina Jolie	Won	
Chicago Film Critics Association Awards	March 13, 2000	Best Supporting Actress	Angelina Jolie	Nominated	
Critics' Choice Movie Awards	January 24, 2000	Best Supporting Actress	Angelina Jolie	Won	
Empire Awards	February 19, 2001	Best Actress	Angelina Jolie	Nominated	
Golden Globe Awards	January 23, 2000	Best Supporting Actress – Motion Picture	Angelina Jolie	Won	
San Diego Film Critics Society Awards	December 20, 1999	Best Supporting Actress	Angelina Jolie	Runner-up	
Screen Actors Guild Awards	March 12, 2000	Outstanding Performance by a Female Actor in a Supporting Role	Angelina Jolie	Won	
Teen Choice Awards	August 6, 2000	Choice Movie – Drama	Girl, Interrupted	Nominated	
Teen Choice Awards	August 6, 2000	Choice Movie Actress	Angelina Jolie	Nominated	
Teen Choice Awards	August 6, 2000	Choice Movie – Hissy Fit	Angelina Jolie	Nominated	
Young Artist Awards	March 19, 2000	Best Leading Young Actress in a Feature Film	Brittany Murphy	Nominated	

== Soundtrack ==
The film's official soundtrack was released on January 18, 2000.

No.	Title	Artist	Length
1.	"Downtown"	Petula Clark	3:05
2.	"It's All Over Now, Baby Blue"	Them	3:50
3.	"Got a Feelin'"	The Mamas and the Papas	2:44
4.	"Time Has Come Today"	The Chambers Brothers	2:37
5.	"Comin' Back to Me"	Jefferson Airplane	5:14
6.	"Angel of the Morning"	Merrilee Rush	3:19
7.	"Right Time"	Aretha Franklin	4:45
8.	"How to Fight Loneliness"	Wilco	3:52
9.	"The Weight"	The Band	4:23
10.	"The End of the World"	Skeeter Davis	2:33

== Sources ==
- Rondinone, Tony (2019). Nightmare Factories: The Asylum in the American Imagination. Baltimore, Maryland: Johns Hopkins University Press. ISBN 978-1-4214-3267-0.
- Chouinard, V. (2009). "Placing the 'mad woman': troubling cultural representations of being a woman with mental illness in Girl Interrupted". Social & Cultural Geography. 10 (7): 791–804. doi:10.1080/14649360903205108.
- Parr, H. (2000). "Interpreting the 'hidden social geographies' of mental health: ethnographies of inclusion and exclusion in semi-institutional places". Health & Place. 6 (3): 225–237. doi:10.1016/S1353-8292(00)00025-3. PMID 10936777.
- Shildrick, M. (2002). Embodying the Monster: Encounters with the Vulnerable Self. London: Sage. doi:10.4135/9781446220573. ISBN 978-0-7619-7014-9.
- Wahl, O.; Wood, A.; Zaveri, P.; Drapalski, A.; Mann, B. (2003). "Mental illness depiction in children's films". Journal of Community Psychology. 31 (6): 553–560. doi:10.1002/jcop.10072.
