= Carl Kaysen =

American academic and policy advisor (1920–2010)

2nd United States Deputy National Security Advisor
- In office 1961–1963
- President: John F. Kennedy
- Preceded by: Walt Whitman Rostow
- Succeeded by: Robert Komer

Personal details
- Born: March 5, 1920 Philadelphia, Pennsylvania, U.S.
- Died: February 8, 2010 (aged 89) Cambridge, Massachusetts, U.S.
- Party: Democratic
- Spouses: Annette Neutra (m. 1940; died 1990) Ruth Butler (m. 1994)
- Children: 2, including Susanna
- Occupation: Economist, author, professor
- Known for: Deputy National Security Advisor under President John F. Kennedy

Carl Kaysen (March 5, 1920 – February 8, 2010) was an American academic, policy advisor and international security specialist at the Massachusetts Institute of Technology (MIT) and co-chair of the Committee on International Security Studies at the American Academy of Arts and Sciences. He is the father of Girl, Interrupted author Susanna Kaysen. He was married for 50 years to Annette Neutra until her death in 1990. In 1994, he married Ruth Butler.

Carl Kaysen worked for President John F. Kennedy as Deputy National Security Advisor, working directly under National Security Advisor McGeorge Bundy. Kaysen took over the position from Walt Rostow in 1961 and concentrated on key issues of the Kennedy Administration such as nuclear weapons, foreign trade, international economic policy and international security policy.

On President Kennedy's orders, Kaysen prepared a report on how to utilize the US nuclear arsenal to preemptively destroy the Soviet Union's nuclear capacity and its ability to retaliate with nuclear weapons.

Kaysen was also a good friend of long-serving Greek Prime Minister Andreas Papandreou, whom he had met at Harvard. After Greece was taken over by a military junta in 1967, Kaysen and John Kenneth Galbraith were instrumental in convincing President Lyndon B. Johnson to decisively intervene in order to secure Papandreou's release from prison.

== Early life and education ==
Kaysen was born in Philadelphia, the son of Elizabeth and Samuel Kaysen.

Kaysen received his B.A. from the University of Pennsylvania in 1940 where he was elected Phi Beta Kappa and was a member of the Philomathean Society. He received both his M.S. in 1947, and Ph.D. in 1954 from Harvard University in Economics. He also did graduate study at Columbia University from 1940 to 1946.

== Career ==
Kaysen's early work was in the areas where economics, sociology, politics and law intersect. Later, his research focused on arms control, international organizations and international politics.

He co-authored Peace Operations by the United Nations: The Case for a Volunteer Military Force (1996) and co-edited The United States and the Fundamental Criminal Court: National Security and Fundamental Law (2000).

He edited and contributed to a volume of essays, The American Corporation Today (1996).

== Career ==
Between 1940 and 1942 he was on the staff of the National Bureau of Economic Research. From 1942 to 1943 he was an Economist for the U.S. Office of Strategic Services, and from 1943 to 1945 he was in intelligence for the U.S. Army Air Forces, rising from private to captain.

After receiving his M.A. from Harvard University in 1947, he was an assistant professor there from 1950 to 1955, and was a clerk to Judge E. E. Wyzanski, U.S. District Court from 1950 to 1952, providing economic analysis for United States v. United Shoe Corporation, a major antitrust case.

In 1954 he received his Ph.D. from Harvard and did military and wartime Service. In 1955, he became an associate professor at Harvard, and in 1957, a full professor of economics. He served as associate dean of the Graduate School of Public Administration at Harvard University from 1960 to 1966.

From 1961 to 1963, he was Deputy National Security Advisor to President John F. Kennedy, a position in which he concentrated on foreign trade, economic policy, and the potential use of nuclear weapons. In this capacity, he was asked to prepare a report on how to utilize the US nuclear arsenal to preemptively destroy the Soviet Union's nuclear capacity and its ability to retaliate with nuclear weapons. Though Kaysen was merely fulfilling Kennedy's demand for alternative nuclear war strategies in case of conflict over Berlin, his report, which envisioned ‘only’ half a million to a million Soviet casualties, caused outrage and disgust within the administration, with White House Chief Counsel Ted Sorensen strongly criticizing him. During the Cuban Missile Crisis, he became known as the "Vice President in charge of the rest of the world."

He was named Lucius N. Littauer Professor of Political Economy at Harvard University from 1964 to 1966.

He served as Director of the Institute for Advanced Study from 1966 to 1976, taking over the position from J. Robert Oppenheimer.

Kaysen joined the MIT faculty in 1976 and was named the David W. Skinner Professor of Political Economy in 1977.

From 1978 to 1980, he was Vice Chairman and Director of Research for the Sloan Commission on Higher Education, an initiative that explored the increasingly complex relationship between government and institutions of higher education.

From 1981 until his death in 2010, he was the director of the Program in Science, Technology and Society at MIT.

He had been a Junior Fellow of the Society of Fellows at Harvard University and a Guggenheim Fellow, and he was a member of the American Academy of Arts and Sciences and the American Philosophical Society.

== Health issues and death ==
Kaysen had spinal stenosis in the final decade of his life. In October 2009, he suffered a bad fall; his health began to fail, and he died in his home in Cambridge, Massachusetts on February 8, 2010. The documentary Inside Job was dedicated to him in 2010.

== Selected publications ==
- “United States v. United Shoe Machinery Corporation”: An Economic Analysis of an Anti-Trust Case, 1956
- The American Business Creed (with Francis X. Sutton, Seymour E. Harris, and James. Tobin), 1956
- Anti-Trust Policy: An Economic and Legal Analysis (with Donald F. Turner), 1959
- The Demand for Electricity in the United States (with Franklin M. Fisher), 1962
- The Higher Learning: The Universities and the Public, 1969
- Content and Context: Essays on College Education (editor), 1973
- A Debate on “A Time to Choose” (with William Tavoulareas), 1977
- Program for Renewed Partnership: A Report, 1980.
- Nuclear Weapons After the Cold War (Foreign Affairs), 1991
- War with Iraq: Costs, Consequences, and Alternatives (American Academy of Arts and Sciences), 2002

== Notes ==
Government offices
| Preceded by Walt Whitman Rostow | Deputy National Security Advisor; 1961–1963 | Succeeded by Robert Komer |
