= San Diego Film Critics Society Awards 1999 =

Annual US film awards ceremony

4th SDFCS Awards

December 20, 1999

Best Film:
American Beauty

The 4th San Diego Film Critics Society Awards, given by the San Diego Film Critics Society on 20 December 1999, honored the best in film for 1999.

== Winners ==
- Best Actor:
  - Kevin Spacey – American Beauty
- Best Actress:
  - Annette Bening – American Beauty
- Best Director:
  - David Lynch – The Straight Story
- Best Film:
  - American Beauty
- Best Foreign Language Film:
  - Tango (Tango, no me dejes nunca) • Spain/Argentina
- Best Screenplay – Original:
  - Being John Malkovich – Charlie Kaufman
- Best Screenplay - Adapted:
  - Election – Alexander Payne and Jim Taylor
- Best Supporting Actor:
  - Philip Seymour Hoffman – Flawless
- Best Supporting Actress:
  - Thora Birch – American Beauty
- Career Achievement Award:
  - Chow Yun-fat
