= By the Sea (2015 film) =

- Theatrical release poster
- Directed by: Angelina Jolie
- Written by: Angelina Jolie
- Produced by: Angelina Jolie; Brad Pitt
- Starring: Brad Pitt; Angelina Jolie
- Cinematography: Christian Berger
- Edited by: Martin Pensa; Patricia Rommel
- Music by: Gabriel Yared
- Production companies: Jolie Pas; Plan B Entertainment
- Distributed by: Universal Pictures
- Release dates: November 5, 2015 (AFI Fest); November 14, 2015 (United States)
- Running time: 122 minutes
- Country: United States
- Languages: English; French
- Budget: $10 million
- Box office: $3.3 million

By the Sea is a 2015 American romantic drama film written and directed by Angelina Jolie (credited as Angelina Jolie Pitt), and produced by and starring Jolie and Brad Pitt. Shot in August 2014 during Pitt and Jolie's honeymoon in Gozo, Malta, the film was released by Universal Pictures on November 14, 2015.

The film received mixed reviews and grossed $3.3 million against its $10 million budget.

== Plot ==
In 1960s France, an American couple, Vanessa and Roland, arrive at a coastal resort for a vacation. They have rented an elegant suite at a local hotel, where Roland, a successful author suffering from writers’ block, hopes to find the inspiration to write a new book.

The two are barely on speaking terms; Vanessa, a former dancer, is withdrawn and grieving for an unknown reason, whereas Roland spends his days drinking in a local bar, where he strikes up a friendship with the manager, Michel.

One day Vanessa notices that a disused radiator pipe has left a hole in the wall adjoining the next apartment. Through this, she spies on a newlywed couple, Lea and Francois, who have just moved in.

Vanessa becomes friendly with Lea, and she and Roland socialise with the couple, going sailing with them. But on a night out, they deliberately get Lea and Francois drunk, so that together they can watch their behaviour through the spy hole.

Gradually their voyeurism leads to Vanessa and Roland rekindling their sexual relationship. However, Vanessa goes further and attempts a sexual liaison with Francois in his hotel room. Roland witnesses this through the hole in the wall, bursts in on them, and attacks Francois.

Back in their own room, the pair have a showdown, which exposes the root of their problem; after several miscarriages, Vanessa has been forced to accept that she can never have children.

Lea and Francois leave the hotel after Francois confesses his infidelity to his wife. Roland goes after them and explains the reasons for Vanessa's behaviour. The couple decide to try to save their marriage, not least because Lea is pregnant.

Having finally come to terms with the reality of their life together, Vanessa seems to achieve a measure of peace and Roland is able to finish writing his book, which he tells Vanessa is all about her.

As Vanessa and Roland leave the hotel and drive away, their future together appears more optimistic.

== Cast ==
- Brad Pitt as Roland
- Angelina Jolie as Vanessa
- Mélanie Laurent as Léa
- Niels Arestrup as Michel
- Melvil Poupaud as François
- Richard Bohringer as Patrice

== Production ==
In May 2014, it was announced that Angelina Jolie would co-star with Brad Pitt in a film titled By the Sea, to be written and directed by Jolie. The Hollywood Reporter speculated it would be a relationship drama that Jolie wrote several years ago, centering on a couple with issues who take a vacation in a last-ditch effort to save their marriage.

This was the first cinematic collaboration between the two since Mr. & Mrs. Smith (2005). Prime Minister Joseph Muscat of Malta confirmed the project, stating that it would be partially filmed at Mġarr ix-Xini.

Jolie stated that the film "at its core, is about grief" further noting that the loss of her mother in 2007 caused a great deal of sadness for her. To that end, the movie resembles movies of the 1960s and '70s; Jolie stated that her mother "loved films of that period". Christian Berger is the cinematographer; he used mostly natural light throughout filming, while Jon Hutman is the production designer. Principal photography and production began on August 19, 2014, in Gozo, Malta, and ended on November 10, 2014.

== Release ==
In May 2015, the film was slated for a November 13, 2015 release.

=== Marketing and promotion ===
Stills from the film were released on September 15, 2014. On August 6, 2015, a teaser trailer for the film was released.

=== Home media ===
By the Sea was released on DVD & Blu-ray in Australia and Germany on June 9, 2016, in the United Kingdom on June 20, 2016, and in Canada and the United States on July 5, 2016.

== Reception ==
=== Box office ===
By the Sea opened theatrically in ten venues, earning $96,250, and ranking number 38 at the domestic box office. As of December 10, the film has grossed $538,460 in the United States and Canada, and $2,796,467 overseas for a worldwide total of $3,334,927.

=== Critical response ===
On Rotten Tomatoes, the film has a rating of 35%, based on 155 reviews, with an average rating of 4.8/10. The site's consensus reads, "By the Sea may intrigue celebrity voyeurs or fans of a certain type of arthouse cinema, but for most viewers, its beauty won't be enough to offset its narrative inertia." On Metacritic, the film has a score of 44 out of 100, based on 35 critics, indicating "mixed or average" reviews.

Justin Chang, chief film critic for Variety said: "By the Sea always offers something to tickle the eye and ear, even as it leaves the heart and mind coolly unstirred."
