= McLean Hospital =

- Mass General Brigham

Geography
- Location: Belmont, Massachusetts, United States
- Coordinates: 42°23′37″N 71°11′28″W

Organization
- Type: Specialist
- Affiliated university: Harvard Medical School, Harvard University

Services
- Specialty: Psychiatric hospital

History
- Opened: 1811

Links
- Website: mcleanhospital.org
- Lists: Hospitals in the United States
- McLean Hospital National Register District
- U.S. National Register of Historic Places
- U.S. Historic district
- Location within Massachusetts
- Location: 115 Mill St., Belmont, Massachusetts
- Area: 308 acres (125 ha)
- Architectural style: Colonial Revival, Tudor Revival, et al.
- NRHP reference No.: 02001733
- Added to NRHP: January 23, 2003

McLean Hospital (/məˈkleɪn/ mə-KLAYN), formerly known as Somerville Asylum and Charlestown Asylum, is a psychiatric hospital in Belmont, Massachusetts. McLean maintains the world's largest neuroscientific and psychiatric research program in a private hospital. It is the largest psychiatric facility of Harvard Medical School, an affiliate of Massachusetts General Hospital, and part of Mass General Brigham, which also includes Brigham and Women's Hospital.

== History ==
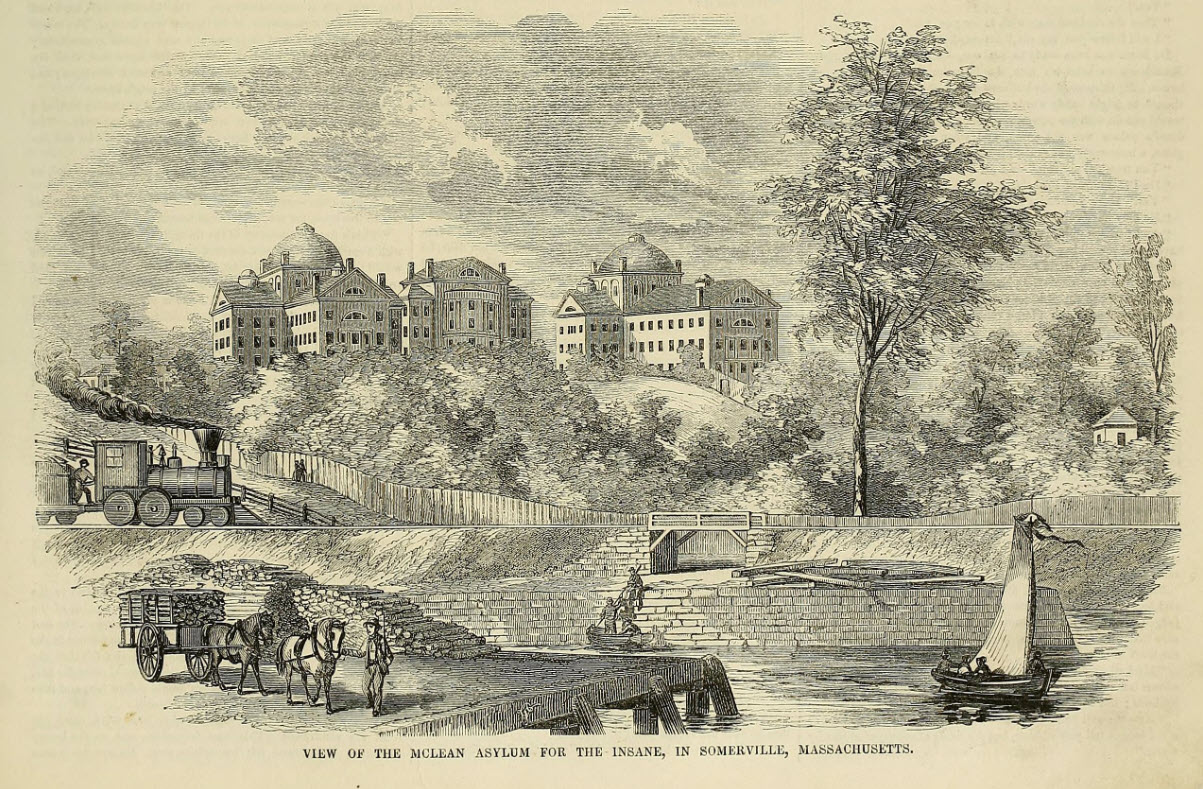
Print of the McLean Asylum in 1853, in Somerville, Massachusetts

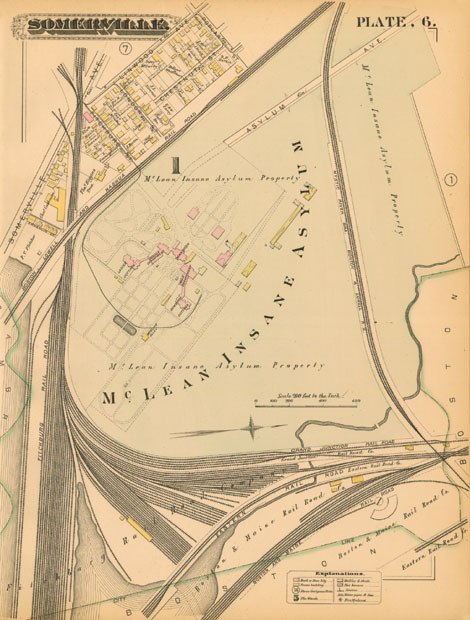
Map of the McLean Insane Asylum from an 1884 atlas of Somerville

McLean was founded in 1811 in a section of Charlestown, Massachusetts, which is now part of Somerville, Massachusetts. Originally named Asylum for the Insane, it was the first institution organized by a group of prominent Bostonians who were concerned about homeless mentally ill persons "abounding on the streets and by-ways in and about Boston". The effort was organized by Rev. John Bartlett, chaplain of the Boston Almshouse. The hospital was built around a Charles Bulfinch mansion, which became the hospital's administrative building; most of the other hospital buildings were completed by 1818.

The institution was later given the name The McLean Asylum for the Insane in honor of one of its earliest benefactors, John McLean, who granted enough money to build several such hospitals. A portrait of McLean now hangs in the present Administration Building, along with other paintings that were once displayed in the original hospital. In 1892, the facility was renamed McLean Hospital in recognition of broader views on the treatment of mental illness.

In 1895 the campus moved to Waverley Oaks Hill in Belmont, Massachusetts. Joseph Curtis (civil engineer) and Frederick Law Olmsted (the renowned landscape architect who also conceptualized the Emerald Necklace public spaces of Boston, Manhattan's Central Park, and Hartford's Institute of Living) were consulted on the selection of the hospital site. The move was necessitated by changes in Charlestown, including new rail lines and other distracting development. Olmsted himself was eventually treated at McLean, but there is no evidence that he was responsible for the design of the grounds. Once hospital construction began, Curtis was hired by the hospital, and supervised the landscape work for many years.

In the 1990s, facing falling revenue in a changing health care industry, the hospital drafted a plan to sell a portion of its grounds for development in the Town of Belmont. The proposed sale of the land caused a divisive and somewhat baroque political debate in the town during the late 1990s. Ultimately a plan to preserve some of Olmsted's original open space and to allow the town to develop mixed residential and commercial real estate prevailed over a plan to create only high-end residential development. A portion of a settlement was used to purchase land later donated to construct the Belmont Community Path. The deal was finalized in 2005, and land development was well under way by the end of the year. Most of the Belmont campus (more than 300 acres (120 ha)) had been listed on the National Register of Historic Places in 2003.

== Current work ==
McLean is known widely for its treatment of adolescents, most specifically its treatment of borderline personality disorder using dialectical behavioral therapy developed by Marsha M. Linehan. McLean has been led by physician Susan Szulewski since November 1, 2025. As president and psychiatrist in chief, she is known for her "'ability to lead across clinical, operational, and strategic priorities,' said Ron M. Walls, MD, chief operating officer for Mass General Brigham."

As one of the teaching hospitals of Harvard Medical School, McLean is differentiated from its New England peers (such as The Institute of Living and the Brattleboro Retreat) by its combination of teaching, treatment, and research; most other facilities focus on only one of these priorities. It is home to the Harvard Brain Tissue Resource Center, the largest "brain bank" collection of research specimens in the world. The hospital developed and implemented national health screening methods for alcohol, depression, and memory disorders. The Cole Resource Center, a mental health consumer resource and advocacy center, is located at the hospital.

== Additional locations ==
In addition to the main Belmont campus, there are four additional locations. The Arlington, Cambridge, and SouthEast (in Middleborough) provide outpatient services, and the SouthEast at Oak Street (in Middleborough) provides inpatient services. Note that the Arlington and Cambridge offices only provide child and adolescent services, while the SouthEast provide services to all ages.

== Rankings ==
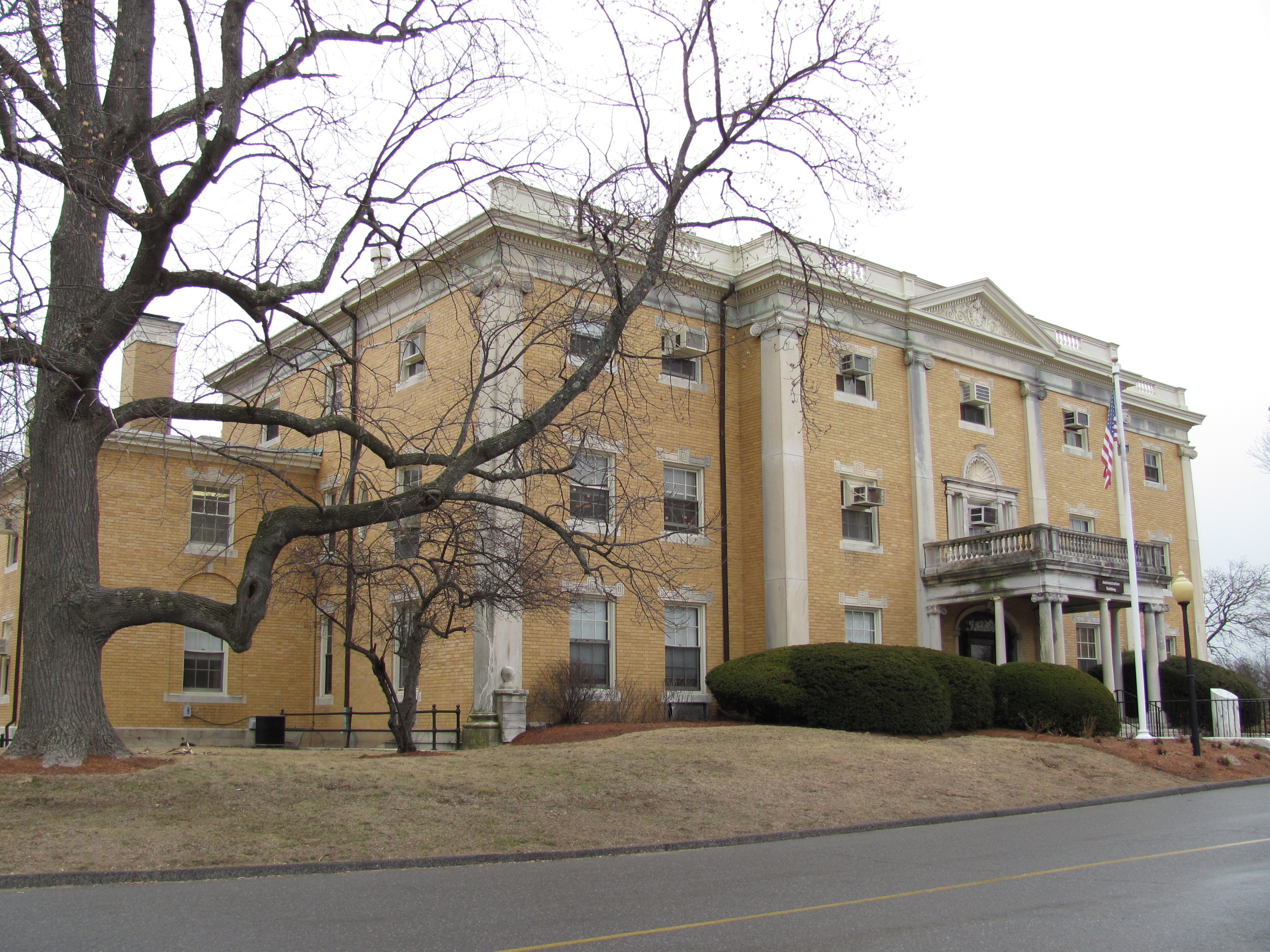
Administration building

- McLean Hospital is ranked 1st among all psychiatric hospitals in the country according to U.S. News & World Report.
- In 2017, McLean ranked among the top 20 independent hospitals worldwide receiving National Institutes of Health grant support.

== Former patients ==
Mathematician John Nash; musicians James Taylor and Ray Charles; poets Sylvia Plath, Robert Lowell and Anne Sexton; Massachusetts politician and Civil War general Nathaniel P. Banks; authors Susanna Kaysen and David Foster Wallace; criminal Michelle Carter; Lindsay Clancy, and actress and singer Selena Gomez have been treated at McLean Hospital.

== In books and media ==
A story about the facility from 1853 describes the work underway and provides some statistics about the capacity and treatment outcomes.

One popular and anecdotal history of McLean is Alex Beam's Gracefully Insane: Life and Death Inside America's Premier Mental Hospital. More-factual and scholarly accounts of the history are recorded in the Little and Sutton books listed in "Further reading".

Memoirs of time spent within McLean's walls include Sylvia Plath's novel The Bell Jar, and Susanna Kaysen's Girl, Interrupted, which was made into a film of the same name starring Winona Ryder and Angelina Jolie. Samuel Shem's roman à clef Mount Misery tells a story inspired at least in part by the author's experiences at McLean. The 1994 Under Observation: Life Inside A Mental Hospital by Lisa Berger and Alexander Vuckovic uses some fictional techniques (composite characters, etc.) to describe some of the typical events at McLean. James Taylor's song "Knockin' 'Round the Zoo" recalls his stay at McLean as a teenager. Poems of Boston and Just Beyond: From the Back Bay to the Back Ward by Doug Holder are based on his more than three decades working there, and are archived at the poetry room at the Lamont Library at Harvard University.

== See also ==
- National Register of Historic Places listings in Middlesex County, Massachusetts
