= Girl, Interrupted =

Memoir by Susanna Kaysen

- Paperback cover
- Author: Susanna Kaysen
- Language: English
- Genre: Memoir
- Publisher: Turtle Bay Books
- Publication date: 1993
- Publication place: United States
- Media type: Print (hard & paperback)
- Pages: 168 pp
- ISBN: 0-679-42366-4
- OCLC: 28155618
- Dewey Decimal: 616.89/0092 B 20
- LC Class: RC464.K36 A3 1993

Girl, Interrupted is a best-selling 1993 memoir by American author Susanna Kaysen, relating her experiences as a young woman in an American psychiatric hospital in the 1960s after being diagnosed with borderline personality disorder.

The memoir's title is a reference to the Johannes Vermeer painting Girl Interrupted at Her Music. Kaysen draws a parallel between the Vermeer painting and her own life by equating music interrupting the girl, with the struggles of poor mental health in adolescence interrupting healthy development, both serving as an impediment to personal evolution. Kaysen draws on the painting as a source of inspiration for critical analysis of the female teenage experience.

While writing the novel Far Afield, Kaysen began to recall her almost two years at McLean Hospital. She obtained her file from the hospital with the help of a lawyer. A film adaptation of the memoir directed by James Mangold and starring Winona Ryder and Angelina Jolie was released in 1999. The memoir inspired the 2021 album Queens of the Summer Hotel by the singer-songwriter Aimee Mann. A Girl, Interrupted musical, with songs by Mann, opened in New York City in 2026.

== Plot ==
In April 1967, 18-year-old Susanna Kaysen is admitted to McLean Hospital, in Belmont, Massachusetts, after attempting suicide by overdosing on pills. She denies that it was a suicide attempt to a psychiatrist, who suggests she take time to regroup in McLean, a private mental hospital. Susanna is diagnosed with borderline personality disorder, and her stay extends to 18 months, rather than the proposed couple of weeks.

Fellow patients Polly, Cynthia, Lisa Rowe, Lisa Cody, Georgina and Daisy contribute to Susanna's experiences at McLean as she describes their personal issues and how they come to cope with the time they must spend in the hospital. The memoir's descriptions of supporting characters gives the reader an idea of how severe each of the characters' circumstances are, which in turn creates a dichotomy between Susanna and the other admittees. Susanna also introduces the reader to some of the staff members, including Valerie, Dr. Wick and Mrs. McWilley. Susanna questions whether the doctors have genuine intentions to successfully treat their patients due to the lack of health progress amongst her peers. Susanna and the other girls are eventually informed that the recently released Daisy died by suicide on her birthday. Daisy's death deeply saddens the girls and they hold a prolonged moment of silence in her memory.

Susanna reflects on the nature of her illness, including the difficulty she has making sense of visual patterns, and suggests that sanity is a falsehood constructed to help the "healthy" feel "normal" in comparison. She also questions how doctors treat mental illness, and whether they are treating the brain or the mind. During her stay in the ward, Susanna also undergoes a period of depersonalization, where she bites open the flesh on her hand after she becomes terrified that she has "lost her bones". She develops a frantic obsession with the verification of this proposed reality and even insists on seeing an X-ray of herself to make sure. This hectic moment is described with short, choppy sentences that show Kaysen's state of mind and her thought processes as she went through them. Also, during a trip to the dentist with Valerie, Susanna becomes frantic after she wakes from the general anesthesia, when no one will tell her how long she was unconscious, and she fears that she has lost time. Like the incident with her bones, Kaysen here also rapidly spirals into a panicky and obsessive state that is only calmed with medication.

After leaving McLean, Susanna mentions that she kept in touch with Georgina and eventually saw Lisa, now a single mother who was about to board the subway with her toddler son and seemed, although quirky, to be sane. Susanna's static mental health state and uncertainty about being "cured" when she is officially released from the institution sheds light on the subjectivity of mental illness. Individuals who exhibit emotions not commonly expressed are ostracized from society when in reality as humans we are all capable of experiencing mental health crises if strictly analyzed by a professional. Being "crazy" was her natural response to life's stressors at an especially vulnerable time dedicated to healing her inner child.

== Characters ==
Alongside Kaysen, there are two main groups of characters: the patients and the staff. In addition there are Kaysen's parents, her boyfriend, and various other minor characters, such as her former boss.

=== Patients ===
Susanna Kaysen
The autobiographical main character, Susanna Kaysen, is admitted to a psychiatric ward to be treated for borderline personality disorder following a suicide attempt. She voluntarily admits herself after a short consultation with a psychiatrist who is also an acquaintance of the family. She is told that she will only be staying there for a few weeks, but it turns out to be one and a half years instead. Throughout the book, she frequently contrasts the time of the consultation, twenty minutes, to the time she ended up spending institutionalised.
Lisa Rowe
Lisa is diagnosed as a sociopath, but whether she actually is one is left open to interpretation. Lisa periodically escapes from the hospital, only to be found a day or two later and re-admitted. She is usually happy enough to be back though she does put up a fight when restrained. She is an ex-junkie who sleeps intermittently and barely eats, and enjoys making trouble for the staff. She apparently takes some pride in her diagnosis. Although she has a therapist assigned to her, she never actually sees him. Lisa is not in contact with her family except her brother, but the extent of their contact is not described. She also has a lawyer, though it appears he is mostly used to threaten the staff if she doesn't get what she wants. Her behavior is wildly unpredictable, and while she can be kind, she is also capable of cruelty towards the other patients. For example, Lisa has an ongoing rivalry with Lisa Cody that ends in Lisa Cody reverting to drugs.
Polly Clark
Polly is a disfigured patient who has been hospitalized for schizophrenia and depression. Polly has severe scarring on her body, the result of setting herself on fire. According to Kaysen, because of the sheer guts it took to actually do it, Polly is highly respected for her courage, to the extent that none of the patients will ask why she did it. During her first year at the hospital, she appears calm and even cheerful: "Life was hellish, she knew that. But, her smile hinted, she'd burned all that out of her." But one day she suddenly breaks down and begins to scream inconsolably, as if realizing for the first time her appearance and the permanency of it. Kaysen then realizes that while the other patients might be released from the hospital, Polly is trapped forever in her scarred body.
Georgina Tuskin
Hospitalized for schizophrenia, Georgina is Susanna's roommate at the institution. The two of them are considered the healthiest patients on the ward and are good friends throughout the book. Georgina apparently experienced her first symptoms after an episode in a movie theater where she suddenly felt as if the darkness had surrounded her completely. It is not clear what the immediate reason for her diagnosis is. She also has a boyfriend in the hospital named Wade.
Lisa Cody
Lisa is admitted to the ward after Susanna, and from her first days there she looks up to Lisa Rowe. She, too, is diagnosed as a sociopath, though Rowe questions this and is clearly annoyed that she is no longer the only sociopath there. A former drug addict like Rowe, she tries hard to defend herself from Lisa Rowe's accusations that she isn't "real". She eventually escapes and is apparently found by Lisa Rowe during one of her escapes from the hospital. Lisa tells the other girls with pride that Lisa Cody has become a "real" drug addict. Her fate after her escape is not described any further.
Daisy Randone
Daisy is a thin girl who arrives before Thanksgiving each year, staying through Christmas. She has a single room, where she spends most of her time. The other girls think she is addicted to laxatives. She eats only chicken, and does so only in her room. However, after letting Lisa into her room, Lisa reports back to the rest of them that she only needs the laxatives because of all of the chicken. She peels off the meat and keeps the carcasses, saying that when she has 14 carcasses, it is time to leave the hospital, possibly due to obsessive–compulsive disorder. Daisy's father visits her quite often, and it is implied he has incestuous feelings for her. Daisy eventually commits suicide on her birthday. Susanna describes her as "sexy" and says Daisy had a spark that the rest of the girls lack. Daisy is reclusive and often refuses to be social. She hates it when anyone goes near her and is hostile when people approach her. However, she does allow Lisa to enter her room. Sometimes they even share cigarettes, indicating that Daisy does respect Lisa out of all the other patients on the ward.
Torrey
Torrey is a former drug addict. She was put into the ward after her parents discovered her promiscuity. She is the best friend of all the fellow patients. Her parents take her out against her will, and take her back to Mexico, where she believes she will become an amphetamine addict again. She describes Mexico, saying "being in Mexico means being dead and shooting speed to feel like you're not quite dead" (Kaysen, 97). The girls do try to help her with an escape plan and pool their money to help her, but eventually that plan is ruined, partly by Torrey herself, as she is too afraid to do it, and partly by Valerie after she gives Torrey a cup of thorazine just prior to her departure to calm her down. Though she only appears for a short time she is an important character. Kaysen distinguishes between those put there indefinitely by parents willing to pay without questioning the progress of their treatment and those whose parents are not willing to do so. Torrey is used as an example of the latter group.
Alice Calais
At first Alice seems quiet and, in Kaysen's words, "not too crazy"; but after about a month she breaks down and is taken to maximum security. When the girls go to visit her they find that she has painted herself and the walls in her seclusion room with her own feces. Most of the other patients believe she was "raised in a closet" because she is ignorant about the trivial things in life. For example, she has never tasted honey and doesn't know how it tastes. She is also completely unaware that her last name is a well-known location in France and is overwhelmed in awe when she hears of the Hundred Years' War. It is not explained what happens to her after the girls visit her.
Wade Barker
Wade, Georgina's boyfriend, is also a patient. Wade entertains the female patients with stories about his father, who he claims is a CIA agent with powerful friends involved in secret government conspiracies. The hospital regards Wade's beliefs as delusional. He is prone to violent outbursts, which eventually results in his being moved to the maximum-security ward. It is revealed that Wade's father's friends are G. Gordon Liddy and E. Howard Hunt, implying that Wade's father is Bernard Barker and that his delusions were based in fact.
Cynthia Crowley
A severely depressive patient who undergoes weekly electroconvulsive therapy. There are only a few references to her in the book and she is not a major character.

=== Staff ===
Valerie
The head nurse on the ward. She works there during the day and though she can be strict she is generally liked by the patients, and by Kaysen in particular. She is described as down-to-earth and rarely uses the psychiatric terms used by the therapists (terms that Susanna herself despises). Kaysen recalls her as honest and direct.
Mrs. McWilley
The evening nurse on the ward. Described as the exact opposite of Valerie and very much disliked by the patients. Kaysen recalls her as "clearly nuts". Valerie does not like her and tends to ignore her, although she does describe her as a professional when the patients complain to her.
Dr. Wick
The consultant psychiatrist. She is described as very old-fashioned and easy to embarrass. Susanna purposely tries to embarrass her, deliberately saying things that she knows Dr. Wick will react to, during their sessions together. She has previously worked in Africa and her direct contact with the patients is very limited, talking to them for only a matter of minutes in a session.
Melvin
Kaysen's late therapist and analyst. Susanna says that the two of them used to be good friends and that she once enjoyed sessions with him. According to her, he was old, balding, and slightly unattractive. Susanna would go into his office sometimes and just sit there in silence because there wasn't very much silence in the hospital and she needed a break. However, this relationship was short-lived; Melvin rolled into the hospital parking lot, and, when greeted enthusiastically by Susanna, refused to entertain her. Her opinion of him spiraled downward from that point.

== Adaptations ==
A film adaptation directed by James Mangold and starring Winona Ryder and Angelina Jolie was released in 1999. In 2018, the American singer-songwriter Aimee Mann and the producers Barbara Broccoli and Frederick Zollo began developing a musical based on Girl, Interrupted, but this was canceled by the COVID-19 pandemic. The songs became the basis of Mann's tenth album, Queens of the Summer Hotel, released on November 5, 2021. The Girl, Interrupted musical opened in New York City in 2026.

== See also ==
- It's Kind of a Funny Story
- Orange Is the New Black: My Year in a Women's Prison (2010)
- Ten Days in a Mad-House
- The Bell Jar
