= Susanna Kaysen =

American author (born 1948)

- Born: November 11, 1948 (age 77); Cambridge, Massachusetts, United States
- Occupation: Author
- Known for: Girl, Interrupted
- Parent(s): Carl Kaysen; Annette Neutra Kaysen

Susanna Kaysen (born November 11, 1948) is an American author, best known for her 1993 memoir Girl, Interrupted.

== Background ==
Kaysen was born and raised in Cambridge, Massachusetts. She is the daughter of Annette (née Neutra) and economist Carl Kaysen, a professor at MIT and former advisor to President John F. Kennedy. Her family is Jewish.

Kaysen attended high school at the Commonwealth School in Boston, and the Cambridge School of Weston, before being sent to McLean Hospital in 1967 to undergo psychiatric treatment for clinical depression. While there, she was diagnosed with borderline personality disorder. She was released after 18 months. She drew on this experience for her memoir Girl, Interrupted in 1993, which was adapted into a film in which she was portrayed by actress Winona Ryder.

Kaysen has one sister and is divorced. She lived for a time in the Faroe Islands, upon which experience her novel Far Afield is based.

== Bibliography ==
- Asa, As I Knew Him, 1987, ISBN 978-0-679-75377-3
- Far Afield, 1990, ISBN 978-0-679-75376-6
- Girl, Interrupted, 1993, ISBN 978-1-85381-835-6
- The Camera My Mother Gave Me, 2001, ISBN 978-0-679-76343-7
- Cambridge, 2014, ISBN 978-0-385-35025-9
