= In the Land of Blood and Honey =

2011 film by Angelina Jolie

- Theatrical release poster
- Directed by: Angelina Jolie
- Written by: Angelina Jolie
- Produced by: Tim Headington; Angelina Jolie; Graham King; Tim Moore
- Starring: Goran Kostić; Zana Marjanović; Rade Šerbedžija
- Cinematography: Dean Semler
- Edited by: Patricia Rommel
- Music by: Gabriel Yared
- Production company: GK Films
- Distributed by: FilmDistrict
- Release date: December 23, 2011 (United States)
- Running time: 127 minutes
- Country: United States
- Languages: Bosnian; Serbian; Croatian; English
- Budget: $14 million
- Box office: $1.1 million

In the Land of Blood and Honey (Bosnian: U zemlji krvi i meda) is a 2011 war drama film written, produced, and directed by Angelina Jolie, and starring Zana Marjanović, Goran Kostić and Rade Šerbedžija. The film, Jolie's first commercial release as a director, depicts a love story set against the background of the Bosnian War. It opened in the United States on December 23, 2011, in a limited theatrical release.

== Plot ==
In Sarajevo, 1992, Ajla Ekmečić is an ethnic Bosniak artist and lives with her sister, Lejla, who is a single mother of a baby boy. One evening, she meets her boyfriend, ethnic Serb police officer Danijel Vukojević, at a club. They enjoy the evening together, but many of the patrons are killed and Danijel is badly injured when the club is destroyed by artillery fire, signifying the opening salvo of the Bosnian War.

Some months later, Ajla and Lejla prepare to flee the now besieged city, but their neighborhood is occupied by the Army of Republika Srpska before they can escape. The men are separated from the women to be executed while Ajla and several other younger, more attractive women are taken away on buses to a Serb rape camp.

In the camp, the soldiers instruct the women on what life will be like and then ask the women what sort of duties they can perform. A doctor named Esma volunteers to perform medical services. Another woman says she can sew; rather than use her skills, an officer rapes her in front of the other women to demoralize them. Before another soldier can do the same to Ajla, the camp's commander takes her away, where it is revealed he is none other than Danijel.

The former couple struggle to grasp the magnitude of their predicament, especially given that inter-ethnic relationships are forbidden, and any evidence of such a relationship could compromise both Danijel and his father Nebojša, a General of the VRS Main Staff. Danijel tells Ajla that to shelter her from sexual abuse at the hands of the other soldiers, he has said that she is his "personal property." Danijel quickly learns he is to be transferred to another military base in Sarajevo, and tells Ajla how to escape in his absence. She succeeds the second time.

Ajla shelters herself in the forest outside the city, where she is found by Bosniak guerrilla forces, who take her back to their camp. In the camp, she happily reunites with Lejla, though this happiness is short-lived when Lejla informs her that her baby was murdered by Bosnian Serb forces some months earlier, sending her into inconsolable grief. Over a campfire, the guerrillas lament the paradoxical insanity of the war, one in particular pointing out that despite the events of the war, he cannot hate all Serbs as his mother is a Serb. Lejla then agrees, and says she only hates the nationalistic Serbs. At this moment, it's found out that Ajla was Danijel's prisoner and lover, and the guerrillas concoct a plan for her to get captured by Danijel's men in order to gain proximity to him, and therefore act as a mole.

Falling for the bait, Danijel orders his men to capture Ajla under the guise of her being Danijel's painter. They end up rekindling their relationship, but Danijel's orders to his men to leave her alone are deemed suspicious. Thus, Nebojša learns of Ajla's existence and the special treatment she receives. While Danijel is at the front line, Nebojša visits Ajla and orders her to paint a portrait of him. While she paints, he criticizes the "Muslim decadence" of such a career, which contrasts starkly with his own mother, a lifelong farm labourer widowed during World War II. Ajla counters that her grandfather was a Partisan, and that he taught her as a child that the constituent peoples of Yugoslavia are all equal irrespective of ethnicity. Nebojša smirks at her observation then leaves her alone with a soldier, Petar, who violently rapes her.

Danijel returns from the front line to find a distraught Ajla crying in the shower. Believing that she has cheated on him, he assaults her, but then sees his father's unfinished portrait and knows what has transpired. Danijel lures Petar to a hill above the city, then kills him. He then confronts his father, who attacks him and berates him for disgracing the family, saying "your mother would turn over in her grave if she knew you liked to fuck Muslim whores."

A sense of normalcy descends on Ajla and Danijel up until the events at Srebrenica. As NATO forces prepare to launch an offensive against the Serbs, Nebojša convenes a meeting with other commanders at a church. Danijel tells Ajla of this meeting, as well as where it was located, and how he would send her a message if he turns out to be safe. At the church, Danijel narrowly avoids being killed alongside his father when a massive explosion destroys the church. Waking up in a haze from the explosion, Danijel sees Lejla across the street and realizes Ajla had betrayed him.

In conjunction with the bombing, ARBiH forces simultaneously launch a counter-offensive. Danijel hastily organizes his troops to halt their advance, but the Serb forces are decimated and most of his men are killed. Danijel returns to the now abandoned camp and finds Ajla patiently waiting. He confronts and beats her for helping to orchestrate the bombing, and she admits to it by apologizing—despite the apology seeming ingenuine. Danijel shoots and kills Ajla instantly.

Danijel wanders through the wreckage of the city, which is now near liberation. Perhaps realizing what the war has driven him to become, and that it was all for nothing, he breaks down in tears on the street in front of UNPROFOR personnel. He admits to being a war criminal, and it's presumed they subsequently arrest him shortly afterwards.

== Cast ==
- Goran Kostić as Danijel Vukojević
- Zana Marjanović as Ajla Ekmečić
- Vanessa Glodjo as Lejla
- Rade Šerbedžija as Nebojša Vukojević
- Feđa Štukan as Petar
- Nikola Đuričko as Darko
- Branko Đurić as Aleksandar
- Jelena Jovanova as Esma
- Alma Terzić as Hana
- Ermin Bravo as Mehmet
- Boris Ler as Tarik
- Goran Jevtić as Mitar
- Miloš Timotijević as Durja
- Ermin Sijamija as Vuc
- Džana Pinjo as Nadja
- Dolya Gavanski as Maida

== Production ==
Jolie got the idea to write a script of a wartime love story after traveling to Bosnia and Herzegovina as a U.N. goodwill ambassador. While writing the script she consulted with Richard Holbrooke, a U.S. diplomat and high-ranking Clinton administration official who was one of the architects of the Dayton Agreement that put an end to the Bosnian War, General Wesley Clark, who was the director for strategic plans and policy on the United States Department of Defense's Joint Chiefs of Staff during the war, and Tom Gjelten, a foreign correspondent for NPR. After finishing the screenplay, she secured a production team and financing for the project that was being called "Untitled Bosnian Love Story." When it came down for the production team to choose a director, Jolie realized she herself wanted to direct. When casting calls and auditions were held, her name was deliberately withheld from all aspects of the project. When it was revealed to the cast that Angelina Jolie wrote the script, a number of them expressed pleasant surprise.

In July 2010, with the film already in pre-production, the producers approached the Serbian tycoon and media magnate Željko Mitrović over the usage of the sound stages and studio sets owned by his Pink International Company's subsidiary Pink Films International in Šimanovci. However, he refused to do business with them, releasing a press statement: "I've held great affection and admiration for Angelina Jolie both as a person and as an artist, but unfortunately she's full of prejudice against the Serbs. I do not wish to be part of something that for the umpteenth time presents the Serbs as eternal bad guys."

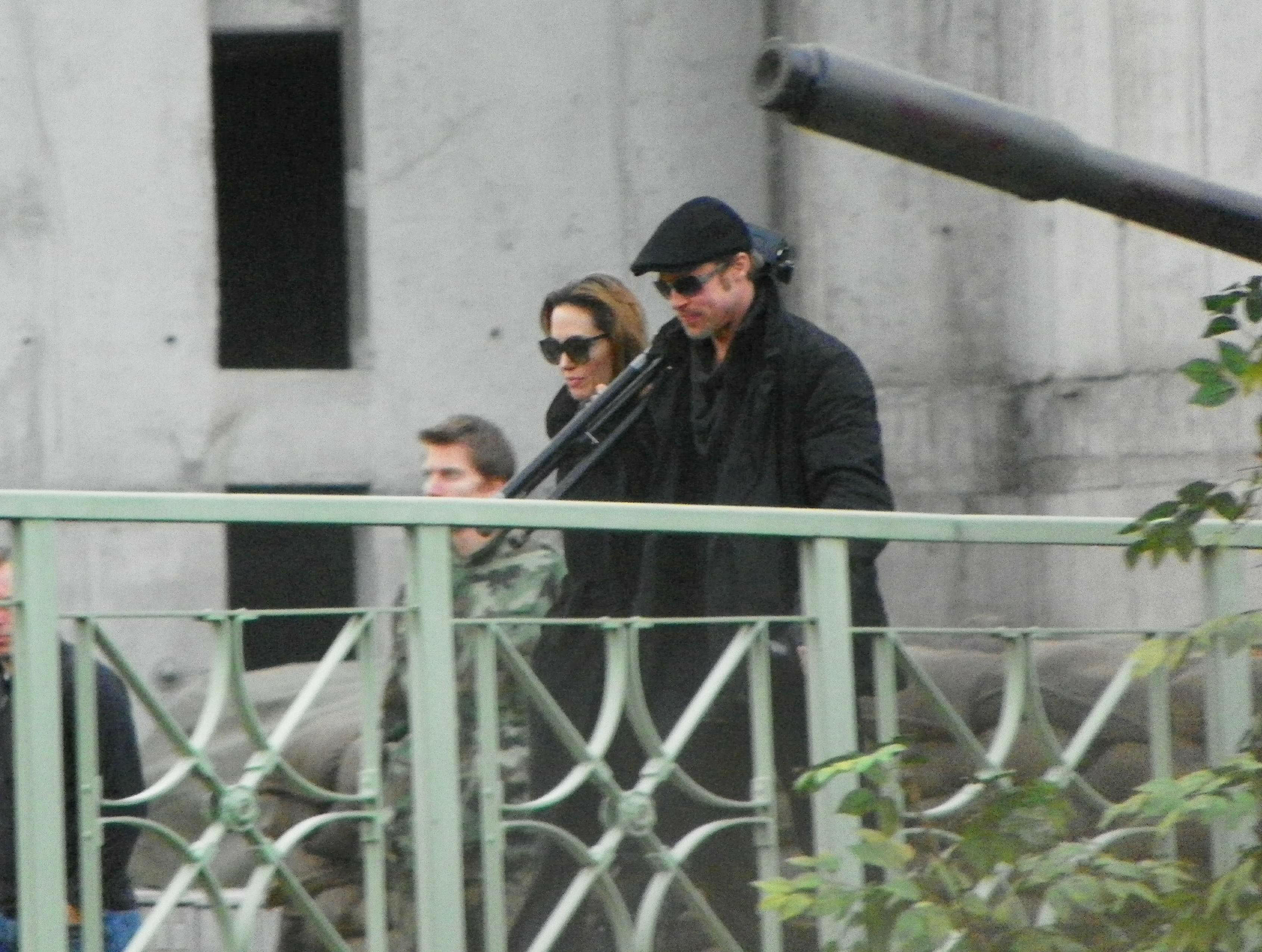
Jolie and Brad Pitt on the set of In the Land of Blood and Honey in Esztergom on November 10, 2010

The film was shot in Budapest and Esztergom during October and November 2010. The cast were entirely local actors from various parts of former Yugoslavia, many of whom lived through the war. Jolie said she spoke with the cast about their experiences during the war and tried to incorporate them into the film. The film was also shot in two versions – one in English, the other in Serbo-Croatian.

Jolie explained the reason she wrote and directed the film was to rekindle attention for the survivors of a war that took place in recent history. In an interview with Christiane Amanpour, Jolie said she felt a responsibility to learn about the conflict in great detail, adding, "This was, you know, the worst genocide since World War II in Europe ... What were we all doing? And did we do enough? And why do we not speak about this enough?" Responding to claims that her film was not balanced, she stated that "The war was not balanced. I can't understand people who are looking for a balance that did not exist. There are some people who don't want to be reminded of these things, some even who deny that these things even happened. Those people are going to be angry."

During production, it was falsely reported that the story was about a Bosnian woman falling in love with her Serbian rapist, prompting protests from the Bosnian Women Victims of War association and the revocation of the filming permit. Jolie denied the rumors and presented the script to Bosnia and Herzegovina's Ministry of Culture, which then quickly reinstated the permit.

=== Plagiarism suit ===
In September 2011, the Bosnian Croat author Josip Knežević, a.k.a. James J. Braddock, accused Jolie of plagiarizing his story Slamanje duše (The Soul Shattering), which was published in December 2007. He claimed to have made repeated attempts to contact the film's producers during the production phase, but they ignored him. He then announced his intention to sue Jolie. On 2 December 2011, he filed a lawsuit against Jolie, GK Films, FilmDistrict, Scout Film (a production company based in Bosnia), and producer Edin Šarkić before the U.S. District Court in Chicago that has jurisdiction over Northern Illinois.

Asked to comment during an interview with Los Angeles Times, Jolie dismissed Knežević's claims: "It's par for the course. It happens on almost every film. There are many books and documentaries that I did pull from, such as work by journalists Peter Maas and Tom Gjelten. It's a combination of many people's stories. But that particular book I've never seen."

In July 2012, the case was transferred to the District Court with jurisdiction over Central California. On 29 March 2013, judge Dolly Gee ruled that no breach of copyright had occurred thus deciding in favor of Jolie, concluding that the two stories were not similar because "Blood and Honey is primarily a story of betrayal, revenge and tragedy with little or no hope, while Slamanje duše focuses on family, love and strength". adding that "although Blood and Honey is also a story of love, it highlights the complications of romantic love during wartime", that "Braddock could not have invented the concept of rape as a war crime", and that similarities are not strong enough particularly in light of the fact that those overlapping concepts are commonplace in books and films depicting war".

Braddock appealed the decision, filing a motion with the United States Court of Appeals for the Ninth Circuit on 11 March 2014. The case was decided in 2017 with the Ninth Circuit siding with Jolie.

== Reaction ==
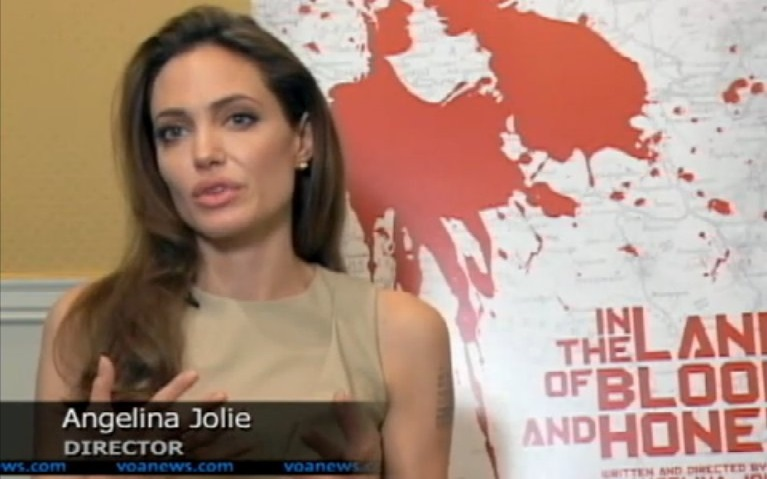
Jolie speaks to the Voice of America about the film at the Sarajevo Film Festival.

Critics expressed mixed feelings after viewing a trailer for the film. Christiane Amanpour, a journalist who covered the Bosnian War for CNN, introduced the film at its New York premiere on December 5, 2011, calling it "remarkable and courageous". The premiere after-party was held on The Standard hotel's rooftop and was co-sponsored by the US foreign policy think tank Council on Foreign Relations (of which Jolie has been a member since July 2007) and Women for Women International, a women's rights organization. The film's script consultant, General Wesley Clark, was also at the premiere, calling the film "incredible."

Washington Post columnist Richard Cohen praised the film, seeing it as an indictment of the hesitant American reaction to the atrocities Serbs committed against Bosniaks in Bosnia and Herzegovina as well as an endorsement of American interventionism such as the 2011 Libyan civil war.

After the film was shown to non-Serb victims in a special screening in Sarajevo, Murat Tahirović, the head of association of prisoners of war, said that Jolie "really succeeded in telling the story of the whole war in her film and to show the most characteristic situations that detainees faced—mass executions, rapes, [being used as] human shields and all the other horrors." The head of Mothers of Srebrenica, Hatidža Mehmedović, who had earlier spoken out against Jolie after the media rumours regarding the film, said the final product was "really an excellent movie," "objective and sincere," and wanted to "thank Angelina for her intellectual and financial investment".

Talking about the film during an appearance on Croatian talk show Nedjeljom u dva, Srđan Dragojević, a Serbian film director, said: "It's a very bad movie. I find it interesting that someone spent $12–13 million for something that in the end looks like those Croatian or Bosniak patriotic propaganda films from the 1990s. In the Land of Blood and Honey has the historical authenticity of 'Allo 'Allo!. It's completely senseless, badly directed, badly written, and deserves absolutely no attention at all, but for the fact it's got the name of a global film star attached to it. And having worked in Hollywood and interacted with some of its movie stars, I think I know how this film got made. Being a big star does not always work to your advantage. These people live their sheltered and insular Beverly Hills lives and have very little clue about what's going on 15 miles away in The Valley, let alone half a world away in Bosnia. This film is a very strange attempt at tackling something you're absolutely clueless about; it would be like me writing a story about American suburbia using news reports as the basis. It seems like nobody had enough courage to tell Angelina that during the making of the film."

In the Serbian media, the film received more negative reviews, arguing that it ignored Serbian war victims and unfairly presented Serbs as evildoers. Serbian filmmaker and two-time Palme d'Or winner Emir Kusturica called it a "propaganda film".

=== Box office ===
By March 8, 2012, the film had recorded domestic box office sales of $308,877.

== Critical reception ==
=== United States ===
The film has received generally mixed reviews. The aggregate film review website Rotten Tomatoes shows that, based on 79 reviews, In the Land of Blood and Honey received a positive response from 57% of critics with an average rating of 5.86/10. Metacritic, which assigns a weighted average, gives the film a score of 56/100 based on 29 critics, indicating "mixed or average" reviews.

Though feeling In the Land of Blood and Honey "has you dreading to learn what atrocity awaits around the next corner", The Hollywood Reporter's Todd McCarthy also thinks Jolie "deserves significant credit for creating a powerfully oppressive atmosphere and staging the ghastly events so credibly."

Variety's Justin Chang penned a negative review of the movie, labeling it a "dramatically misguided attempt to renew public awareness of the 1992–95 Balkan conflict" that "springs less from artistic conviction than from an over-earnest humanitarian impulse." He didn't like the way the film "almost seems to sense its scenario tilting into tarted-up banality and abruptly shifts gears, to shockingly blunt effect" and criticized the actors for being a bit colorless, especially Marjanović and Kostić who "don't seem entirely at home with their characters' fairly risible dynamic."

Manohla Dargis of The New York Times has some issues with the way certain characters' dialogues are used as "short history lesson on the region that's clearly meant for the benefit of those watching the movie", but for the most part feels the movie "moves briskly and easily holds your attention, largely through a perverse love story that doesn't suffer for being such an obvious metaphor for the larger battle raging beyond Ajla and Danijel's relationship."

Jake Coyle of Associated Press wrote a negative review in which he gives Jolie some credit for "using her celebrity to bring attention to the dangers of pacifism in the face of war crimes and ethnic cleansing", but criticizes her for "a heavy-handed touch" as well as for "putting politics ahead of story and character, thus blatantly imposing a message, which results in a movie whose narrative feels like a fictionalized United Nations presentation." He also has problems with the way the story is told – from "not enough context given to the overall conflict", over to "the love story that feels increasingly myopic as the war drags on and the film's ambitions broaden", and finally the way the film "makes its case only in the illustration of extreme, intolerable violence instead of finding a way to dramatize international inaction."

Joe Neumaier of the New York Daily News sees the biggest accomplishment of In the Land of Blood and Honey to be "the way it never loses sight of the closeness of the combatants, turning national intimacy into a tragic casualty." He goes on to commend the actors for "their commitment that helps us through a movie that is often harrowing, never less than intense but important, one unafraid of moments too many have chosen to forget."

According to Los Angeles Times resident critic Kenneth Turan Jolie accomplished something that "is both impressive and unexpected." However, "The Ajla/Danijel relationship is not always convincing, key plot points can feel contrived and the preponderance of Bosnian Serb bad guys comes off as schematic." He further points out Lu Chuan's film City of Life and Death as an example of "how far In the Land of Blood and Honey needs to travel." He writes that Jolie has accomplished a great deal in a difficult area. "She has done her homework about the conflict's disturbing, unflinching atrocities as well as the rationales the Bosnian Serbs used for their actions.

The Village Voice's Karina Longworth's review is particularly negative. She dismisses the movie as "a United Nations extra-credit project about the Bosnian War" and criticizes Jolie for "producing a sanctimonious vanity commercial for her own good intentions."

Nathan Rabin of The A.V. Club refers to In the Land of Blood and Honey as "a film of shuddering earnestness and fevered good intentions gone awry, a dreary slog of a message movie with little but noble if unfulfilled aspirations to commend it." He continues by opining that "Serbian groups have justifiably complained about Jolie's glib stereotyping of Serbs as racist heavies" before concluding that "Jolie has, after disastrously received 2003 message movie Beyond Borders, once again succeeded in attracting international attention to international atrocities and it's possible, if not particularly likely, that someday she will get around to dramatizing atrocities compellingly as well".

=== Europe ===
Screen International's Howard Feinstein commended Jolie for "attempting to rectify the gross injustices perpetrated against the Muslims that were tolerated in the name of a mythological Greater Serbia, masterminded by Slobodan Milošević", while reproaching her for "going beyond acceptable dramatic license and presenting the Serbs as caricatures". He furthermore has issues with her script "that often misses the boat" and its "over- and under-drawn characters."

In the Dutch daily De Volkskrant, Bor Beekman slated In the Land of Blood and Honey as "messy, unnatural war porno" and gave the film one star out of five. Beekman regarded the plot as rambling, and replete with implausible developments. Most objectionable was the unnatural dialogue, which rubs in the meaning of war dilemmas some more, as if they were not already made obvious (in scenes of gruesome cruelty). Typifying is the scene where Ajla, the Bosnian Muslim, hides behind a corpse during a solitary escape through the forest. The scene is completely gratuitous, but it supplies Jolie with a compelling visual image. "However well-intentioned, it is war porno."

== Awards ==
Ceremony	Category	Nominee	Result
23rd Producers Guild of America Awards	Stanley Kramer Award		Won
69th Golden Globes	Best Foreign Language Film		Nominated
43rd NAACP Image Awards	Outstanding Foreign Motion Picture		Won
43rd NAACP Image Awards	Outstanding Directing in a Motion Picture	Angelina Jolie	Nominated
Sarajevo Film Festival	Honorable Mention		Won
