= Foundation of Darul Uloom Deoband =

Establishment of the seminary in 1866 CE

Darul Uloom Deoband
- دارالعلوم دیوبند
- Type: Islamic seminary (darul uloom)
- Established: 15 Muharram 1283 AH, Thursday (31 May 1866)
- Founders: Muhammad Qasim Nanautawi; Sayyid Muhammad Abid; Fazlur Rahman Usmani; Mahtab Ali Deobandi; Nihal Ahmad Deobandi; Zulfiqar Ali Deobandi
- Religious affiliation: Sunni Islam (Deobandi)
- Academic affiliations: Deobandi movement
- Rector: Sayyid Muhammad Abid (first rector / muhtamim)
- First teacher: Mahmud Deobandi (Mulla Mahmūd) (appointed at 15 rupees/month)
- Location: Deoband, Uttar Pradesh, India
- Campus: Urban

The Foundation of Darul Uloom Deoband refers to the establishment of the Darul Uloom Deoband seminary in North India in 1283 AH / 1866 CE. The seminary was established as an Arabic madrasa in the town of Deoband, with its first teacher appointed on a small local salary and classes beginning in the Chhatta Masjid. At the time of its establishment, the institution relied on funds gathered by local notables and community leaders.

The identity of the institution’s “founder” has been a subject of differing interpretations among later historians. Early sources including printed reports, biographies, and announcements from the late nineteenth century consistently identify Sayyid Muhammad Abid as the founder and primary initiator of the madrasa. However, in the twentieth century, some writers, particularly Muhammad Miyan Deobandi, discussed the matter under the title “Bani-e-A‘zam” (“the Great Founder”) and expressed the view that the present stature and expansion of Darul Uloom Deoband owe much to Muhammad Qasim Nanautawi, whose scholarship, vision, and organizational ability shaped the seminary into a comprehensive center of Islamic learning.

== Establishment (1283 AH / 1866 CE) ==
Muhammad Tahir Qasmi (younger son of Hafiz Muhammad Ahmad) records that on 15 Muharram 1283 AH, Thursday (31 May 1866), a group of scholars and community members including Sayyid Muhammad Abid, Fazlur Rahman Usmani, Mahtab Ali Deobandi, Nihal Ahmad Deobandi, and Zulfiqar Ali Deobandi in Deoband gathered to establish an Arabic madrasa with funds raised locally.

Azizur Rahman Bijnori likewise records these events on the basis of documentary and oral reports: he notes that Sayyid Muhammad Abid personally initiated the fundraising, collecting about four hundred rupees after first contributing five rupees of his own, and then wrote to Muhammad Qasim Nanautawi in Meerut to request his involvement. Nanautawi responded by appointing Mulla Mahmud on a stipend of fifteen rupees per month, under whom teaching commenced in the Chhatta Masjid; the first student is variously reported as Mahmud Hasan (later Shaykh al-Hind).

Early records, such as the roodad of 1283 AH, mention the date explicitly as 15 Muharram, Thursday, but without providing a Gregorian equivalent. In later writings the lunar date was correlated differently by various authors: Muhammad Miyan Deobandi placed it in 1867, Muhammad Tayyib Qasmi explicitly gave 30 May 1867, while Syed Mehboob Rizwi printed 30 May 1866 in his Tārīkh-e-Deoband. More recently, Muhammadullah Khalili Qasmi examined the original roodad and weekday correspondence and demonstrated that the correct Gregorian equivalent is 31 May 1866, since 15 Muharram 1283 AH fell on a Thursday, not on a Wednesday.

=== Anecdotes and oral tradition ===
Muhammad Tahir Qasmi records that the first lessons took place under a pomegranate tree in the Chhatta Masjid at the edge of the town, with Mahmud Hasan Deobandi (later Shaykh al-Hind) mentioned as the first student to begin his studies under Mahmud Deobandi.

Nazeer Ahmad Deobandi records that after a spiritual retreat Sayyid Muhammad Ābid proposed establishing a madrasa to preserve religious knowledge, contributing funds himself and collecting nearly four hundred rupees in donations. He then wrote to Muhammad Qasim Nanautawi in Meerut, requesting him to come and teach. Nanautawi replied with delight, promising to remain a supporter of the madrasa, and appointed Mulla Mahmūd as the first teacher with a stipend of fifteen rupees; Mahmud soon arrived and began instruction in the Chhatta Masjid.

A different version, cited by Manazir Ahsan Gilani from an early manuscript, records that the location was the floor of the Chhatta Masjid and that the first teacher was Mahmud Deobandi, but the first student was Abdul Aziz rather than Mahmud Hasan. This account does not include reference to any pomegranate tree.

Gilani pointed out that although the manuscript omits the tree and names Abdul Aziz as the first student, Hafiz Muhammad Ahmad repeated the pomegranate tree anecdote in his convocation address of 1328 AH (1910 CE), delivered in the presence of Mahmud Hasan himself. Gilani reasoned that a figure such as Hafiz Muhammad Ahmad, addressing thousands of alumni before the very person identified as the first student, would be unlikely to repeat the anecdote publicly if it had no basis.

=== Established as an Arabic madrasa ===
An early printed roodad (report) for 1283 AH opens with the sentence: "Praise be to God that the year 1283 Hijri has ended in well-being. This is the blessed year in which the foundation of an Arabic madrasa (Madrasa-e-Arabi) was laid in Deoband."

Manazir Ahsan Gilani draws attention to the first-year report’s list of examination texts — including Sharh Wiqaya, Sharh Mulla, Maybazi, Qutbi, Usul al-Shashi and Siraji — as evidence that Arabic instruction formed the core curriculum from the institution’s inception, while Persian instruction and Qurʾān memorisation classes appear only in the second-year report (1284 AH). Azizur Rahman Bijnori likewise records that in the first year (1283 AH) the madrasa's syllabus included the same Arabic works noted above.

Gilani argued against the claim that the madrasa began merely as a small local maktab later converted into an Arabic madrasa, maintaining instead that the evidence shows it was established from the outset as an Arabic theological madrasa and only later broadened.

By contrast, Syed Mehboob Rizwi, citing a printed announcement issued four days after the founding (19 Muharram), reproduces its closing line which already described the institution as "Madrasa-e-ʿArabi wa Fārsi wa Riyāzi, Qasbah Deoband."

Contemporary accounts likewise support the sequence in which Arabic teaching began first. Yaqub Nanautawi and Nazeer Ahmad Deobandi record that Mahmud Deobandi (Mulla Mahmūd) was appointed as the first teacher on a stipend of fifteen rupees and that instruction began in the Chhatta Masjid; as student numbers rose, further teachers of Persian and Qurʾān were appointed and a consultative council (shura) established to manage the school.

Ziya-ul-Hasan Faruqi, summarising Muhammad Miyan Deobandi, described the early phase as a modest Arabi maktab in the Jamiʿ Masjid raised into a Darul-ʿUlum in the late 1860s, noting initial opposition by Sayyid Abid Husain to relocating beyond the mosque. Muhammad Miyan's own text, however, citing Arwah-e-Thalathah, consistently uses the term madrasah rather than maktab for this period, and records the episode of the foundation stone where Ābid, persuaded by Qasim Nanautawi, participated in the ceremony. The same episode is also narrated in Arwah-e-Thalathah, a composite work consisting of three treatises — Amīr al-Riwayāt, Riwayāt al-Tayyib (drawn from the statements of Muhammad Tayyib Qasmi, grandson of Qasim Nanautawi), and Ashraf al-Tanbih.

Azizur Rahman Bijnori further records that while Abid initially opposed shifting the madrasa beyond the Chhatta Masjid, considering the mosque’s quarters sufficient, he was eventually persuaded and himself placed the second brick at the foundation ceremony of the new campus in 1292 AH (1875 CE).

=== Relocation and new construction ===
In its early years, the Darul Uloom Deoband did not possess a permanent building. Classes initially began in the Chhatta Masjid, after which the madrasa moved for some time to the Qazi’s Mosque and later to rented houses. As the number of students increased, the institution's organizers began to consider constructing a dedicated building for the seminary. At first, some elders arranged for necessary rooms and cells to be built within the courtyard of the Jamiʿ Masjid, and teaching continued there for several years.

Later, however, it was decided that the madrasa should be relocated to a spacious site on the outskirts of the town so that future expansion would be possible and the mosque and madrasa could operate independently. For this purpose, various locations were inspected, and finally, on the suggestion of Muhammad Qasim Nanautawi, the site was chosen where the Darul Uloom stands today.

At a prize distribution ceremony held in Dhu al-Qaʿdah 1291 AH, an appeal was made for funds for the construction of the new building, and generous donations were received from well-wishers. The following year, on Friday, 2 Dhu al-Hijjah 1292 AH (1875 CE), after the congregational prayer in the Jamiʿ Masjid, a large gathering was held, attended by scholars from Muradabad, Aligarh, and other cities, at which the foundation of the new structure was laid.

According to Muhammad Miyan Deobandi, Sayyid Muhammad Abid initially opposed the proposal, believing that the three-arched structure of the Jamiʿ Masjid was sufficient. However, Muhammad Qasim Nanautawi affectionately persuaded him and requested that he participate in laying the foundation. The first brick was placed by Miyān Ji Munne Shah, followed by Sayyid Muhammad Abid, Rashid Ahmad Gangohi, and finally Nanautawi himself. On that day, it is said, the gathering of scholars and elders was filled with an extraordinary sense of spiritual joy and elation.

== Role of Sayyid Muhammad Abid ==
Several early accounts emphasize the role of Sayyid Muhammad Abid in initiating the project. His biographer Nazeer Ahmad Deobandi describes a dream in which Abid saw the Prophet Muhammad, after which he gathered companions and proposed establishing a madrasa to preserve Islamic learning.

A printed announcement dated 1889, signed by members of the madrasa's shura, explicitly refers to him as the "founder and first proposer" (bānī wa mujawwiz awwal). Abdul Hai Hasani also writes that "Sayyid Muhammad Abid established the Islamic seminary at Deoband, which Qasim Nanautawi approved of and supported."

Zulfiqar Ali Deobandi, father of Mahmud Hasan Deobandi, in his al-Hadiyya al-Saniyya (c. 1890), likewise described Sayyid Muhammad Abid as the "founder" (bānī) of the institution, while attributing to Muhammad Qasim Nanautawi the role of providing intellectual support and contributing to its development.

Later writers echo the same. Abul Hasan Ali Nadwi records that the madrasa first opened in 1866 under the guidance of Sayyid Muhammad Abid in a small mosque, while crediting Muhammad Qasim Nanautawi with the courage and religious fervour that enabled its subsequent development into a major Islamic university.

Rashid Ahmad Jalandhari (Lahore, 1988) likewise records that after the upheaval of 1857, Abid Husain took the first step by proposing the establishment of a madrasa, contributing funds himself and collecting nearly four hundred rupees from the townspeople. He then wrote to Muhammad Qasim Nanautawi in Meerut, who responded positively by appointing Mulla Mahmud as the first teacher on a stipend of fifteen rupees. Jalandhari notes that Abid presided over the shura as founder and rector without taking any salary, while Nanautawi provided scholarly patronage and intellectual leadership.

== Role of Muhammad Qasim Nanautavi ==
Although not described as the initiator in the earliest accounts, Muhammad Qasim Nanautawi is documented as having given intellectual and organizational support. His colleague Yaqub Nanautawi noted that when the madrasa was founded, Sayyid Muhammad Abid, Fazlur Rahman Usmani and Zulfiqar Ali Deobandi were among those who proposed it, while Qasim Nanautawi later became a key patron and supervisor.

Later writers such as S. M. Ikram credited him with envisioning the madrasa’s growth into a large seminary, arguing that while the founders may have intended only a small maktab, Nanautawi's vision laid the foundation for a full-fledged Darul Uloom.

Writing in the mid-twentieth century, Muhammad Miyan Deobandi mentioned Sayyid Muhammad Abid, Mahtab Ali, and Nihal Ahmad among the early founders of the madrasa. He argued, however, that although these figures initiated the establishment of the school, Muhammad Qasim Nanautawi should be regarded as the bānī-e-aʿẓam (“principal founder”). According to Miyan, Abid considered the three-arched structure of the Jamiʿ Masjid sufficient and opposed the proposal for a separate building, while Nanautawi envisioned a more organized and expanded institution. On this basis, Miyan concluded that the later development and institutional form of Darul Uloom Deoband reflected Nanautawi's leadership and educational vision.

== Founding members and early management ==
Syed Mehboob Rizwi, citing an 1866 record, lists the earliest figures involved in the madrasa's establishment as Sayyid Muhammad Abid, Muhammad Qasim Nanautawi, Mahtab Ali Deobandi, Zulfiqar Ali Deobandi, Fazlur Rahman Usmani, Fazl-e-Haque Deobandi and Nihal Ahmad Deobandi. He notes that they were not only members of the first shura but also its earliest builders, with Qasim Nanautawi as the first patron and Sayyid Muhammad Abid as the first rector (vice-chancellor).

Muhammadullah Khalili Qasmi similarly refers to these individuals as the "founding members" (arākīn-e tāsīsī) of the seminary.

== Later disputes and reinterpretations ==
According to Ghulam Yahya Anjum, consensus remained until around 1903 that Sayyid Muhammad Abid was regarded as the founder. Debate arose when Muhammad Tayyib Qasmi, a grandson of Qasim Nanautawi and later rector of the seminary, wrote works such as Darul Uloom Deoband ki 67 Saala Zindagi (Sixty-Seven Years of Darul Uloom Deoband) and Maslak-e-Darul Uloom Deoband (The School of Thought of Darul Uloom Deoband), in which he credited his grandfather as the principal founder (bānī-yi aʿẓam).

Abdul Hafeez Rahmani traced this shift to Hafiz Muhammad Ahmad’s rectorship in 1905, while noting that prior sources described Nanautawi as patron or supporter, not as founder. He highlights a 1306 AH (1889) printed announcement, signed by Rashid Ahmad Gangohi and other leaders of the madrasa, which explicitly described Sayyid Muhammad Abid as the "founder and first proposer" (bānī wa mujawwiz awwal).

Manazir Ahsan Gilani rejected as a “self-made assumption” the claim that Muhammad Qasim Nanautawi intentionally kept his role in the foundation of the madrasa hidden for political reasons. However, Muhammad Tayyib Qasmi, in a marginal note, suggested that Nanautawi’s limited public involvement at the time could reasonably be understood in light of the political sensitivities and surveillance that prevailed under British rule.

Ishtiaque Ahmad Qasmi, analysing early announcements and biographical records, concludes that Sayyid Muhammad Abid was the founder (bānī) and first proposer (mujawwaz awwal) of the madrasa. He stresses that while Abid initiated and financed the project, Muhammad Qasim Nanautawi from the very outset provided scholarly patronage and later assumed intellectual and institutional leadership that shaped the seminary’s character.

S. M. Ikram took a similar line, writing that Nanautawi was "not the actual founder of the Deoband madrasa" but it was his higher vision that raised it from a small maktab into a grand Darul Uloom. According to him, the elders who began the school likely intended nothing more than a modest madrasa within the arcades of the Jamiʿ Masjid, but Nanautawi's expansive imagination laid broad foundations for a major seminary.

Ghulam Yahya Anjum underlined that despite Nanautawi's contributions, the original founder remained Sayyid Muhammad Abid. He compared the case to Sir Syed Ahmad Khan's Madrasatul Uloom at Aligarh: although colleagues elevated it to a college and then a university, the founder is still regarded as Sir Syed. Likewise, Anjum argued, today's Darul Uloom Deoband is the developed form of the madrasa established in 1866 by Abid, and denying him the title of founder is unjustifiable.

=== Sindhi's assessment ===
Ubaidullah Sindhi, in his Ḥizb-e-Imām Walīullāh Dehlawī kī Ijmālī Tārīkh kā Muqaddama (1942), offered a distinct interpretation of the seminary's foundation. He wrote that after the fall of Delhi, Imdadullah Muhajir Makki convened a council in Mecca where it was resolved that a madrasa should be established on the model of Shah Abdul Aziz's Delhi seminary. Sindhi further states that Muhammad Qasim Nanautawi worked continuously for seven years to mobilise support, eventually persuading a group to establish the seminary at Deoband. According to him, it was by Nanautawi's efforts that similar madrasas were also founded at Saharanpur and Moradabad as branches of Deoband.

Sindhi also emphasised that the seminary’s original seven-year curriculum and fundamental regulations were drawn up by Qasim Nanautawi, who preserved in them the objectives of Shah Waliullah and Shah Abdul Aziz. Later revisions, under Yaqub Nanautawi and Mahmud Hasan (Shaykh al-Hind), retained this "Waliullahi spirit."

He further noted that the political and organisational principles of the madrasa were laid down collectively by Imdadullah, Qasim Nanautawi, Rashid Ahmad Gangohi and Yaqub Nanautawi, and held that no one could truly belong to the “Deobandi party” without full acceptance of these principles.

=== Bijnori's assessment ===
Azizur Rahman Bijnori, writing in his Tadhkira-e Shaikh al-Hind' (1965), presented a detailed case that the founding of the madrasa in 1283 AH (at the Chhatta Masjid) must be attributed to Sayyid Muhammad Abid rather than to Qasim Nanautawi. He argued, first, that when the initial fundraising took place, Nanautawi was not in Deoband but engaged in proof-reading work in the presses of Meerut and Delhi, and that his name does not appear in the madrasa’s records before 1290 AH. According to Bijnori, it was Abid who first spread a handkerchief for donations, placed five rupees of his own, and collected three hundred rupees in one evening, before writing to Nanautawi in Meerut to request a teacher. Nanautawi’s reply, preserved in Sawānih-e-Qāsmi, stated that he would send Mulla Mahmud on a stipend of fifteen rupees per month, and that he himself would remain engaged in striving for the welfare of the madrasa.

Bijnori further noted that the earliest principals (muhtamims) were Abid Husain (1283–84, 1286–88, 1306–10) and Shah Rafiʿ al-Din, and that contemporary documents—including an 1889 printed announcement signed by Rashid Ahmad Gangohi and others—explicitly named Abid as "founder and first proposer" (bānī wa mujawwiz awwal). He also cited the 1905 convocation address and later reports as evidence for a twentieth-century shift, when some sources began describing Nanautawi as founder. For Bijnori, this represented a historical change, since earlier documents, as well as works like al-Hadiyya al-Saniyya of Zulfiqar Ali Deobandi, consistently credited Sayyid Muhammad Abid with the founding.

At the same time, Bijnori made it clear that the organized and comprehensive framework of the later Dar al-ʿUlum was primarily devised by Muhammad Qasim Nanautawi, whose vision was further developed and brought to fruition through the efforts of Mahmud Hasan Deobandi and Hussain Ahmad Madani. In his conclusion, he proposed that if the foundation is taken as 1283 AH in the Chhatta Masjid, then Sayyid Muhammad Abid must be regarded as the founder; but if the decisive foundation is dated to 1292 AH with the laying of the stone of the present campus, then Qasim Nanautawi may be seen as its founder.

Iqbal Hasan Khan (Aligarh Muslim University), after analysing these early accounts, concurs with Bijnori's view that Sayyid Muhammad Abid was the actual founder, while acknowledging that Qasim Nanautawi later gave the madrasa its wider vision.

=== Modern scholarship ===
Modern secondary sources across South Asian and Western scholarship consistently identify Sayyid Muhammad Abid as the founder of Darul Uloom Deoband. Christophe Jaffrelot notes that "a Sufi by the name of Abid founded a seminary in 1867" soon joined by Muhammad Qasim Nanautawi and Rashid Ahmad Gangohi. Ziauddin Sardar describes the initiative as that of "a well-known Sufi saint" who became the seminary's first patron, while Jocelyne Cesari and Lini S. May similarly identify him as its founder.

The journal Hamdard Islamicus highlights that Abid's initiative came in response to the collapse of Delhi's madrasa after 1857, and Kuldip Kaur further emphasizes that Abid personally laid the foundation stone on 30 May 1866 as the leader of the group of scholars.

== See also ==
- Darul Uloom Deoband
- Muhammad Qasim Nanautavi
- Sayyid Muhammad Abid
