= Habibur Rahman Usmani =

British Indian Islamic scholar (d. 1929)

Fakhr-ul-Hind, Mawlana Habibur Rahman Usmani

9th Vice Chancellor of Darul Uloom Deoband
- In office 1928 – 5 December 1929
- Preceded by: Hafiz Muhammad Ahmad
- Succeeded by: Qari Muhammad Tayyib

Deputy VC of Darul Uloom Deoband
- In office 1907–1925
- Succeeded by: Qari Muhammad Tayyib

Grand Mufti of Hyderabad State
- In office December 1925 – September 1926

Personal life
- Born: 1277 AH (1860/1861 AD) Deoband, Saharanpur district, North-Western Provinces, British India
- Died: 6 December 1929 (aged 68–69) Deoband, Saharanpur district, United Provinces of Agra and Oudh, British India
- Parent: Fazlur Rahman Usmani (father)
- Education: Darul Uloom Deoband
- Occupation: Islamic scholar, muhaddith
- Relatives: Aziz-ul-Rahman Usmani (brother); Shabbir Ahmad Usmani (brother); Usmani family of Deoband

Religious life
- Religion: Islam
- Denomination: Sunni Islam
- Jurisprudence: Hanafi
- Creed: Maturidi

Muslim leader
- Teacher: Yaqub Nanautawi; Mahmud Deobandi; Syed Ahmad Dehlavi; Mahmud Hasan Deobandi

Habibur Rahman Usmani (1860–1929), also known as Habibur Rahman Deobandi and Maulāna Habib al-Rahmān, was an Indian Islamic scholar, Arabic writer and poet, and Islamic jurist. He served as Deputy Vice-Chancellor and later as Vice-Chancellor of Darul Uloom Deoband for nearly twenty-three years. He succeeded Hafiz Muhammad Ahmad as the Grand Mufti of Hyderabad State, holding the position for about one year.

His students included Shabbir Ahmad Usmani, Manazir Ahsan Gilani, Muhammad Shafi, Habibur Rahman Azami, Muhammad Idris Kandhlawi, Atiqur Rahman Usmani, Qari Muhammad Tayyib, Badre Alam Merathi, Hifzur Rahman Seoharwi, Saeed Ahmad Akbarabadi, Manzoor Nomani, and Yusuf Banuri.

== Early life and education ==
Habibur Rahman Usmani was born in Deoband in 1277 AH (1860/1861 AD).

His father was Fazlur Rahman Usmani, a co-founder of Darul Uloom Deoband, and his brothers included Azizur Rahman Usmani and Shabbir Ahmad Usmani.

He studied at Darul Uloom Deoband from an early age and graduated in 1300 AH (1883 AD). His teachers included Yaqub Nanautawi, Mahmud Deobandi, Syed Ahmad Dehlavi, and Mahmud Hasan Deobandi. His classmates included Hafiz Muhammad Ahmad.

He was an authorized disciple of Rashid Ahmad Gangohi in Sufism.

== Career ==
After graduation, he was appointed a teacher at Darul Uloom Deoband, and later, in 1907 AD (1325 AH), he was promoted to Deputy Vice-Chancellor, a position he held until 1925 AD (1343 AH).

In late Jumada al-Ula 1344 AH (early December 1925 AD), he succeeded Hafiz Muhammad Ahmad as Grand Mufti of Hyderabad State. He returned to Deoband on 12 Rabi' al-Awwal 1345 AH (late September 1926) and worked as Vice-Chancellor, assisting Hafiz Muhammad Ahmad, who was the Head-VC at the time. In late 1928 AD (1347 AH), he was appointed the Vice-Chancellor of Darul Uloom Deoband and remained in this position until his demise in December 1929.

His students included Shabbir Ahmad Usmani, Manazir Ahsan Gilani, Muhammad Shafi, Habib al-Rahman al-A'zami, Muhammad Idris Kandhlawi, Atiqur Rahman Usmani, Qari Muhammad Tayyib, Badre Alam Merathi, Hifzur Rahman Seoharwi, Saeed Ahmad Akbarabadi, Manzoor Nomani, Yusuf Banuri, and Abdul Hafeez Balyawi.

In April 1910 (Rabi' al-Awwal 1328 AH), he launched Darul Uloom Deoband's first magazine, Monthly Al-Qasim, and served as its editor until its publication was discontinued in March 1920. Later, in Muharram 1344 AH (July 1925 AD), when the magazine was reissued, he resumed his role as editor. However, after four years, in 1347 AH (1928), its publication was permanently discontinued. Similarly, from Rajab 1332 AH (May 1914) to Jumada al-Ukhra 1339 AH (March 1920), he served as the editor of Monthly Al-Rashid, another Darul Uloom publication, from its inception until it was discontinued.

Qari Muhammad Tayyib states that Anwar Shah Kashmiri once remarked, "If I am influenced by anyone's knowledge, it is Maulana Habibur Rahman."

He was an active member of the Jamiat Ulama-e-Hind and presided over its fourth conference held in Gaya, Bihar, between 24 and 26 December 1922 AD (Jumada al-Ula 5–7, 1341 AH), where he delivered the presidential sermon.

He actively participated in the Khilafat movement and presided over several conferences held in Meerut and Muzaffarnagar, UP, between March and April 1920.

== Literary works ==
Usmani specialized in Arabic and Urdu literature and history. He wrote a qasida entitled Lāmiyat al-Mu'jizāt, which describes one hundred miracles of the Islamic prophet Muhammad in about three hundred verses. It has also been translated into Urdu by Izaz Ali Amrohi. He wrote another qasida of two hundred and eighty-five verses titled Bāmiyat-ul-Mu'jizāt, which explores one hundred miracles of Prophet Muhammad.

He composed several poems in honor of Hyderabad State's last Nizam, Mir Osman Ali Khan. These poems were not written for financial gain but rather to express admiration for the Nizam’s concern and interest in religious affairs and Islamic institutions, particularly because he granted a monthly donation of five hundred rupees to Darul Uloom Deoband.

His works include:

- Mu'īn al-Labīb Fī Jam'-i-Qasāid al-Habīb (his dīwān, compiled by Izāz Alī Amrohi)
- Ishā'at-e-Islām: Dunya Mein Islām Kiyun Kar Phala? (in Urdu; transl. Spread of Islam: How did Islam spread across the world?)
- Ta'līmāt-e-Islām (in Urdu; transl. The Teachings of Islam)
- Hāshiyah Maqāmāt-e-Harīrī (his Urdu annotations on Al-Hariri's Maqamat al-Hariri)
- Hāshiyah Tafsīr al-Jalālayn (his annotations on Al-Mahalli's Tafsir al-Jalalayn)
- Rahmatul Lil-Ālamīn or Sīrat-e-Sayyid al-Murasalīn (an incomplete prophetic biography of the Islamic prophet Muhammad)

== Death ==
Usmani died on 4 Rajab 1348 AH (6 December 1929 AD) in Deoband and was buried in Qasmi cemetery.

Sulaiman Nadvi, in an issue of Ma'arif magazine published in Azamgarh, expressed his grief over Usmani's passing and described his death as the greatest academic and educational loss of that month.

== See also ==
- List of Deobandis
