= Muhammad Shafi =

Sunni Deobandi Islamic scholar (1897–1976)

Mufti Muhammad Shafi
- مفتی محمد شفیع

1st President of Darul Uloom Karachi
- In office 1951 – 6 October 1976
- Preceded by: Position established
- Succeeded by: Abdul Hai Arifi

4th Head Mufti of Darul Uloom Deoband
- In office c. 13 August 1931 – c. November 1935
- Preceded by: Riyazudin Bijnori
- Succeeded by: Muhammad Sahool Bhagalpuri

7th Head Mufti of Darul Uloom Deoband
- In office c. 4 April 1940 – c. 23 March 1943
- Preceded by: Kifayatullah Gangohi
- Succeeded by: Farooq Ahmad

Personal life
- Born: 24 January 1897 Deoband, North-Western Provinces, British India
- Died: 6 October 1976 (aged 79) Karachi, Sindh, Pakistan: British Indian (1897–1947); Indian (1947–1948); Pakistani (1948–1976)
- Children: Rafi Usmani, Taqi Usmani
- Era: Modern
- Main interest: Tafsir
- Notable work(s): Ma'ariful Qur'an, Seerat Khatam al-Anbiya
- Education: Darul Uloom Deoband

Religious life
- Religion: Islam
- Denomination: Sunni
- Jurisprudence: Hanafi
- Tariqa: Chishti (Sabiri-Imdadi)
- Creed: Maturidi
- Movement: Deobandi

Muslim leader
- Disciple of: Ashraf Ali Thanwi; Mahmud Hasan Deobandi
- Students: Abul Hasan Jashori Hafez Ahmadullah Muhammad Abdullah Ghazi
- Influenced by: Mahmud Hasan Deobandi Habibur Rahman Usmani Anwar Shah Kashmiri Shabbir Ahmad Usmani Ashraf Ali Thanwi Aziz-ul-Rahman Usmani Mian Asghar Hussain Deobandi Izaz Ali Amrohi Ibrahim Balyawi
- Influenced: Taqi Usmani Rafi Usmani

Muhammad Shafi (24 January 1897 – 6 October 1976), often referred to as Mufti Muhammad Shafi, was a Pakistani Sunni Islamic scholar of the Deobandi school, a Hanafi jurist and mufti, he was also an authority on shari'ah, hadith, Qur'anic exegesis, and Sufism. Born in Deoband, British India, he graduated in 1917 from Darul Uloom Deoband, where he later taught hadith and held the post of Head mufti. He resigned in 1943 to devote his time to the Pakistan Movement. After the independence he moved to Pakistan, where he established Darul Uloom Karachi in 1951. Of his written works, his best-known is Ma'ariful Qur'an, an Urdu commentary on the Qur'an.

== Birth and early childhood ==
Muhammad Shafi, son of Muhammad Yasin, was born on 24 January 1897 (20 Sha'ban 1314 AH) in Deoband, British India, to an Usmani family. He was given the name "Muhammad Shafi" by his father's sheikh, Rashid Ahmad Gangohi, though he was originally named "Muhammad Mubin" by his grandfather, Khalifah Tahsin Ali. Shafi grew up in a religious environment. As a child he played in the courtyard of Darul Uloom Deoband and sat in the company of his father, who was a teacher at the school.

== Education ==
Aged five, Shafi began memorizing the Qur'an with Muhammad Azim and Namdar Khan at the Darul Uloom. In 1907 or 1908 (1325 AH), he commenced the study of Urdu, Persian, mathematics and other subjects at Darul Uloom Deoband, which he completed within the next five years under the supervision of his father.

He studied arithmetic and Euclid from his uncle Munshi Manzur Ahmad and Quranic recitation from Muhammad Yusuf Miruthi. Along with teaching Shafi the Persian books, Maulana Yasin also instructed him in the elementary Arabic books of sarf (morphology), nahw (grammar), and fiqh (jurisprudence), up to Fusul-i Akbari, Hidayat an-Nahw, and Munyat al-Musalli.

In 1330 AH (1912) or 1331 AH (1913) Shafi was formally enrolled in the upper level Arabic classes of Darul Uloom Deoband. He did Daurah Hadith in 1335 AH (1916/1917) under the supervision of Anwar Shah Kashmiri, and completed his education in 1336 AH (1917/1918). The teachers under whom Shafi formally studied included:

- Anwar Shah Kashmiri
- Shabbir Ahmad Usmani
- Azizur Rahman Usmani
- Mian Asghar Hussain Deobandi
- Izaz Ali Amrohi
- Muhammad Rasul Khan
- Muhammad Ibrahim Balliyawi
- Ghulam Rasul Hazarwi
- Hafiz Muhammad Ahmad

Among his teachers was Anwar Shah Kashmiri, who was the school's head teacher. Some of the books Shafi studied with him were Sahih al-Bukhari, Sahih al-Tirmidhi (with the exception of a small part), at-Tirmidhi's Shama'il and 'Ilal, al-Falsafah al-'Arabiyah on modern philosophy, and Sharh an-Nafisi on medicine (tibb). Shafi was among Kashmiri's closest students, and Kashmiri would later select Shafi for assistance in refuting the Ahmadiyya Movement. Shafi studied Sahih Muslim and half of Hidayah with Shabbir Ahmad Usmani, whom he would later accompany in the movement to create Pakistan. With Mian Asghar Hussain Deobandi he studied the hadith collections Sunan Abu Dawud, Sunan an-Nasa'i, and the remainder of Sahih al-Tirmidhi. With Azizur Rahman, head of the Darul Uloom's Fatwa Department, Shafi studied the Muwatta of Imam Malik in the transmission of Yahya ibn Yahya and the transmission of ash-Shaybani, at-Tahawi's Sharh Ma'ani al-Athar, Tafsir al-Jalalayn, Mishkat al-Masabih, Ibn Hajar's Sharh Nukhbat al-Fikar, and Hisn-i Hasin. He studied Sunan Ibn Majah with Ghulam Rasul Hazarwi. With Izaz Ali Amrohi he studied all the books of literature, Maibazi's Sharh Hidayat al-Hikmah, at-Taftazani's Sharh al-'Aqa'id al-Nasafiyah, Ubayd Allah al-Mahbubi's Sharh al-Wiqayah, and some other treatises. With Maulana Muhammad Ibrahim he studied Sadra and Shams al-Bazighah.

After Daurah a few books still remained, including Qazi, Mir Zahid, and Umur-i 'Ammah—these were completed in 1336 AH (1917/1918). In that year Shafi was also appointed to teach some lessons.

== Career ==
Shafi began teaching at Darul Uloom Deoband in 1918 or 1919 (1337 AH). He taught the elementary level books of the curriculum and eventually reached the level of Daurah Hadith. The first book of Daurah level that he was given was Muwatta Imam Malik, and he later taught other books. In 1354 AH (1935/1936) he was entrusted with teaching Sunan Abu Dawud for some time in place of Maulana Asghar Husain. On Husain's request he was given this lecture permanently, and he taught it until he left Darul Uloom Deoband in 1943 (1362 AH). Shafi was regarded as an exceptional lecturer on many subjects, but two of his lessons were most famous—one was Sunan Abu Dawud, and the other was Maqamat al-Hariri in Arabic literature. After leaving Darul Uloom Deoband, he taught Sahih al-Bukhari for three months at Jamiah Islamiyah Dabhel, filling in for Maulana Shabbir Ahmad Usmani.

Shafi established Darul Uloom Karachi in 1951 (Shawwal 1370 AH). There he taught Sahih al-Bukhari for several years, as well as Muwatta Malik and Shama'il at-Tirmidhi. Whenever due to health or other responsibilities he was unable to teach the whole of Bukhari, then those years he would teach until the Book of Wudu, and other teachers would cover the remainder. In the last four years of his life, he was bedridden and thus unable to teach regularly. However, on the insistence of students and teachers, every year he taught the first lesson of Sahih al-Bukhari and the last lessons of the Sihah Sittah.

== Fatwa, Rulings ==
Shafi frequently assisted Azizur Rahman Usmani, head of the school's fatwa department. Azizur Rahman resigned from the Darul Uloom in 1344 AH (1925/1926). Others occupied the post of Sadr Mufti (Chief Mufti) until the Majlis-e-Shura of Darul Uloom Deoband appointed Shafi to the post on 28 Rabi al-Awwal 1350 AH (c. 13 August 1931). (Note: Mufti Muhammad Shafi writes in the introduction to Ma'ariful Qur'an that he occupied the post from 1349 AH.) In additions to undertaking the duties of fatwa-writing, Shafi also continued to teach some books of hadith and tafsir.

In November 1932 (Rajab 1351), Shafi published a tract entitled Nihayat al-arab fi ghayat an-nasab on caste. The weavers of the Deoband area (who were regarded as a lower caste) revolted against the fatwa, and from early 1353 AH (1934/1935) to late 1354 AH (1935/1936) rallies were held and threats were made against Shafi, in response to which a group of teachers took to acting as his bodyguards. Several scholars wrote or spoke in defense of the fatwa, including Shafi's shaikh Ashraf Ali Thanwi, Sayyid Asghar Husain, and Husain Ahmad Madani. Due to the controversy, Shafi asked to be transferred to the teaching department, a request that was eventually granted by the Majlis-e-Shura in Sha'ban 1354 AH (c. November 1935).

Shafi remained in the teaching department over the next few years, during which two other ulama held the post of Sadr Mufti. On 25 Safar 1359 AH (c. 4 April 1940), Shafi was appointed to the office a second time. He held the post until he left Darul Uloom Deoband in Rabi al-Awwal 1362 AH (March 1943). (Note: Syed Mehboob Rizwi writes that Shafi occupied the post until 1361 AH (1942).)

Estimates of the number of fatwas that he issued while at Darul Uloom Deoband range from 26,000 to over 40,000. Some of Muhammad Shafi's fatwas have been published in eight large volumes titled Imdad al-Muftin, while the majority remain unpublished.

== Tasawuf ==
From an early age, Shafi frequently attended the gatherings of Mahmud Hasan Deobandi. Then when Mahmud Hasan was imprisoned in Malta, Shafi consulted Ashraf Ali Thanwi. Mahmud Hasan returned to Deoband in June 1920 (20 Ramadan 1338 AH). In 1339 AH (1920) Shafi gave bay'at (allegiance) at his hand. However, Mahmud Hasan died a few months later on 18 Rabi al-awwal AH (November 1920). Shafi returned to Thanawi after Mahmud Hasan's death. In Rabi ath-thani 1349 AH (1930) he received ijazat-i bay'at (permission to take disciples) and khilafah (spiritual successorship).

== Pakistan Movement ==
When the All-India Muslim League was formed to campaign for the creation of a separate Muslim state, Ashraf Ali Thanvi instructed all Muslims, including scholars, to support this campaign. Shafi and other scholars, including Zafar Ahmad Usmani, joined the Jamiat Ulema-e-Islam, a council of Islamic scholars formed by Shabbir Ahmad Usmani to campaign for the creation of Pakistan. In 1363 AH (1944) Muhammad Shafi resigned from teaching and issuing fatwas at Darul Uloom Deoband in order to devote his time to the movement for the creation of Pakistan. He toured India, gave speeches, and issued fatwas for this purpose.

== Migration to Pakistan ==
In 1948 (1367 AH), after the partition of India, Shafi migrated from Deoband to Pakistan. He founded Darul Uloom Karachi in 1370 AH (1950/1951). He died on 10 Shawwal 1396 (6 October 1976).

== Life in Pakistan ==
He remarked that the various educational systems that came into being under the British rule – traditional Madrasahs, spearheaded by Deoband, and modern schools, spearheaded by Aligarh – should be integrated thus balancing the religious and worldly dimensions of knowledge and nurturing.

He avoided disputes at all costs and on occasion, he even gave up land allocated to him by the government of Pakistan to build a Madrasah, just to avoid a dispute that has arisen in the process.

== Works ==
He wrote around one hundred books explaining the Quran and interpreting Islamic law.

His best-known and most widely translated work is the Ma'ariful Qur'an ("The Wisdom of the Quran"), which he finished (in Urdu) four years before his death. This work, a commentary on the entire Quran, began as a series of weekly lectures on Radio Pakistan that ran for ten years.

== Notes ==
Religious titles
Preceded by Riyazuddin Bijnori	fourth Head Mufti of Darul Uloom Deoband; 13 August 1931 - November 1935	Succeeded by Muhammad Sahool Bhagalpuri
Preceded by Kifayatullah Gangohi	seventh Head Mufti of Darul Uloom Deoband; 4 April 1940 - 23 March 1943	Succeeded by Farooq Ahmad
