= Deoband School =

Deoband School may refer to

- Darul Uloom Deoband, an Islamic college in Deoband, India
  - Deobandi movement in Sunni Islam

== See also ==
- Deoband, the city in India where the school is situated and where the movement began
