= Muhammad Munir Nanautavi =

Indian Islamic scholar and freedom fighter (1831–1904)

Rector of Darul Uloom Deoband
- In office 1894–1895
- Preceded by: Fazl-e-Haque Deobandi
- Succeeded by: Hafiz Muhammad Ahmad

Personal life
- Born: 1247 AH / 1831 CE Nanauta, British India
- Died: 1321 AH / 1904 CE (approx.)
- Main interest(s): Islamic scholarship, Sufism
- Notable work(s): Siraj al-Salikin, Fawa'id-e-Ghariba
- Occupation: Islamic scholar, Sufi, administrator
- Relatives: Siddiqi family of Nanauta

Religious life
- Religion: Islam
- Denomination: Sunni
- Jurisprudence: Hanafi
- Movement: Deobandi

Muslim leader
- Teacher: Mamluk Ali Nanautavi, Sadruddin Khan Azurda Dehlawi, Shah Abdul Ghani Dehlavi
- Influenced by: Muhammad Qasim Nanautavi, Rashid Ahmad Gangohi

Muhammad Munir Nanautavi (1831–1904) was an Indian Islamic scholar, administrator, and freedom fighter associated with the Deobandi movement. He was a disciple of prominent scholars such as Mamluk Ali Nanautavi, Sadruddin Khan Azurda Dehlawi, and Shah Abdul Ghani Dehlavi. He actively participated in the Indian Rebellion of 1857 and played a key role in the Battle of Shamli. Following the uprising, he devoted himself to education and became a teacher at Bareilly College. In 1894, he was appointed the fourth rector (muhtamim) of Darul Uloom Deoband, a position he held for a brief period before resigning in 1895. He was also known for his contributions to Islamic literature, particularly in Sufism and Hanafi jurisprudence.

== Early life and education ==
Muhammad Munir was born in 1831 in Nanauta, a town in present-day Uttar Pradesh, India.

Nanautavi was the younger brother of Mazhar Nanautawi. He received his early education from his father, Hafiz Lutf Ali, in Nanauta and later studied under renowned scholars in Delhi, including Mamluk Ali Nanautavi, Sadruddin Khan Azurda Dehlawi, and Shah Abdul Ghani Dehlavi.

== Career ==
=== Role in the Indian Rebellion of 1857 ===
Nanautavi actively participated in the Indian Rebellion of 1857 and fought in the Battle of Shamli.

During the battle, he was appointed as the commander of the left flank (Maysera) of the rebel forces. Additionally, according to Muhammad Tayyib Qasmi, citing Mian Mansoor Ansari, Nanautavi was entrusted with the responsibility of protecting Muhammad Qasim Nanautavi. Imdadullah Muhajir Makki specifically instructed him to ensure Nanautavi's safety, emphasizing: "Maulana Muhammad Qasim is fearless and ventures into every row; never leave his side at any moment."

This suggests that Nanautavi served as ADC (Aide-de-Camp) to Qasim Nanautavi during the rebellion. However, it is also likely that while he was given command of the left flank during battle, he was otherwise assigned to stay close to Qasim Nanautavi and ensure his protection. Given his close familial ties and deep devotion to Qasim Nanautavi, he naturally remained by his side.

=== Academic and administrative career ===
After the war, when the period of hiding ended, Nanautavi moved to Bareilly, where he secured a teaching position at Bareilly College in 1861. Alongside his teaching duties, he also worked with his elder brother Muhammad Ahsan Nanautavi at 'Matba-e-Siddiqi,' a printing press they managed together.

In 1894, he was appointed as the fourth rector of Darul Uloom Deoband, succeeding Fazl-e-Haque Deobandi. He held this position for a little over a year before resigning in 1895. In addition to his official duties, he also taught Arabic literature to students outside regular class hours at Darul Uloom Deoband.

== Writings ==
Nanautavi wrote several works on Islamic theology and Sufism. His major works include:

- Siraj al-Salikin – An Urdu translation of Imam Ghazali's Minhaj al-Abidin, published in 1864.
- Fawa'id-e-Ghariba – A treatise on Tasawwuf (Islamic mysticism).
- A short treatise on the rules of Hajj.

== Personal integrity ==
Nanautavi was recognized for his adherence to ethical principles. According to Arwah-e-Salasa, he once traveled to Delhi to print an annual report for Darul Uloom Deoband but had the allocated funds stolen. Instead of informing the administration, he returned home, sold his land, and used the proceeds to complete the printing. When members of Darul Uloom's governing council later became aware of the incident, they sought guidance from Rashid Ahmad Gangohi, who issued a fatwa stating that Nanautavi was not personally responsible for the loss. Despite this, he declined reimbursement, reportedly stating that Gangohi himself would not have accepted the money in a similar situation.

== Death ==
The exact date of his death is unknown, but records indicate that he was alive until at least 1321 AH (1904 CE).
