= Azizur Rahman Bijnori =

Indian mufti and writer (d. 2004)

Mawlana, Mufti Azizur Rahman Bijnori
- Urdu: عزیز الرحمن بجنوری
- Born: 1927; Nehtaur, Bijnor district, United Provinces of Agra and Oudh, British India
- Died: 21 September 2004 (aged 76–77); Nehtaur, Bijnor district, Uttar Pradesh, India
- Education: Darul Uloom Deoband
- Occupations: Islamic scholar, jurist (mufti), teacher, author
- Movement: Deobandi
- Children: 6, including Ubaidur Rahman Bijnori and Abidur Rahman Mazahiri

Azizur Rahman Bijnori (1927 – 21 September 2004) was an Indian Islamic scholar, jurist, teacher, and author associated with the Deobandi movement. He studied at Darul Uloom Deoband under Hussain Ahmed Madani, later taught in Bijnor, and established the madrasa Madīnat al-ʿUlūm. He wrote extensively, with works including Anfās-i Qudsiyya, Tadhkira Shaykh al-Hind, Tadhkira Mashāʼikh Deoband, Tārīkh al-Aḥkām, and Tafsīr Taqrīr al-Qurʾān.

== Early life and education ==
Azizur Rahman Bijnori was born in January 1927 in Nehtaur, Bijnor district. His father was ʿAbd al-Rahman and his grandfather was Ḥusain Bakhsh. His great-grandfather Ḥāfiẓullāh was killed during the 1857 uprising. Originally from Mandawar, the family later resided in Tarkola village where his grandfather was raised by a Sayyid household.

Bijnori began his schooling in Nehtaur and Bijnor, excelling in mathematics and other subjects. After working in various forms of manual labour, he was appointed as a primary-school teacher in Mahmoodpur village.

In 1949 he resigned from government service to pursue advanced studies in Persian and Arabic under Hamid Hasan Gangohi (father of Mahmood Hasan Gangohi). In 1951–52 he enrolled in Darul Uloom Deoband and graduated from there in 1954 (1373 AH). His teachers included Hussain Ahmad Madani, Izaz Ali Amrohi, Bashir Ahmad Khan, Jaleel Ahmad Kairanawi, Fakhrul Hasan Moradabadi, and Mirajul Haq Deobandi.

He also trained in fatwa writing under Mahdi Hasan Shahjahanpuri and studied traditional medicine under Syed Maḥfūẓ ʿAlī Deobandi. After completing his studies, he pledged spiritual allegiance (bayʿat) to Hussain Ahmad Madani, and in 1955 he was granted authorisation to take disciples, becoming his khalifa.

== Career ==
After completing his advanced studies at Darul Uloom Deoband, Bijnori initially taught at Madrasa Rahmaniyya in Bijnor. He subsequently returned to his hometown and briefly practiced traditional medicine. In September 1957, on the advice of his teacher Hussain Ahmed Madani, he accepted the position of deputy superintendent at the Muslim orphanage in Bijnor, receiving a modest salary.

In the late 1950s, Bijnori noted the limited provision of Arabic religious education in Bijnor, where only a few institutions such as the Muslim orphanage school, Muslim Inter College, and Madrasa Rahimiyya were functioning. In 1958 he established Madīnat al-ʿUlūm, initially operating from rented rooms near Qazi Pārah mosque. The madrasa was moved to the Murdgan area in 1967, and in 1968 land was acquired for a permanent campus.

Alongside his teaching, Bijnori engaged in issuing legal opinions (fatwas) and continued writing. He also founded a small publishing initiative named Madani Dar-ut-Talīf, through which many of his works were produced.

== Literary works ==
Azizur Rahman wrote extensively on biography, history, and Qurʾanic studies. His works include:

- Sīrat-e Khayr al-ʿIbād (Urdu translation of Zād al-Maʿād)
- Hayāt Imām Aʿẓam Abū Ḥanīfa (biography of Abu Hanifa)
- Tadhkira Shaykh al-Hind (tadhkira of Abdul Qadir Gilani)
- Tadhkira Shaykh al-Hind (tadhkira of Mahmood Hasan Deobandi)
- Anfās-i Qudsiyya (tadhkira of Hussain Ahmad Madani)
- Tadhkira Mashāʼikh Deoband (tadhkira of Deobandi scholars and saints)
- Hayāt-e-Maulana Muhammad Yūsuf (biography of Yusuf Kandhlawi)
- Anwār al-Bāri (a commentary on Sahih al-Bukhari)
- Tārīkh al-Aḥkām (a history of Islamic rulings)
- Tafsīr Taqrīr al-Qurʾān (written in a daʿwah-oriented style, 1986)
- Taqsīrāt fī Tafhīm (a critique of Abul A'la Maududi's Tafhīm al-Qurʾān)
- Tafsīr-i Rashīdiī (Qur’anic commentary of Rashid Ahmad Gangohi; first compiled by Muhammad Mazhar Hasan Muradabadi, re-edited by Azizur Rahman Bijnori)
- Seerat-e-Mubarak Risalat Ma’ab (Urdu translation of Rawdat al-Ahbab, a work of seerah by Sayyid Jamal Husaini)
- Madhhab-e-Mukhtār (Urdu translation of Abu Bakr al-Kalabadhi's Bahr al-fawa´id/ Ma´ani al-akhbar)

== Death ==
Azizur Rahman died on 21 September 2004 in Bijnor.

== Views ==
In his work Tadhkira Shaykh al-Hind, Bijnori questioned the commonly held view that Darul Uloom Deoband was founded by Muhammad Qasim Nanautawi. He argued, citing early accounts, that its founding was initiated collectively by scholars including Sayyid Muhammad Abid, Zulfiqar Ali Deobandi, Mahtab Ali Deobandi, and Fazl-e-Haque Deobandi, while Nanautawi was at that time in Meerut.

=== On cloning ===
During a seminar of the Islamic Fiqh Academy, Bijnori expressed his opinion on the issue of human cloning. He stated that the Qurʾan describes the natural process of human creation through a man and a woman, and this system cannot be replaced. He argued that cloning would eliminate the role of the father, disrupt family life, and abolish lineage. Quoting verses of the Qurʾan (23:12–16; 7:189; 30:21; 49:13; 30:30), he described cloning as a change in Allah’s creation and compared it to painting or imitating living beings, which is prohibited in Islamic teachings. He further remarked that experiments of artificial reproduction are against Qurʾanic injunctions and attributed such innovations to Jewish (Banī Isrāʾīlī) influence.

=== On the use of the Internet ===
Bijnori was among the scholars who permitted the use of the Internet and other modern systems of communication for religious purposes. He, along with other ulama, considered it permissible to employ such means for the defense of Islam and dissemination of its teachings, provided that it did not involve anything prohibited by the Sharia.
