= Rafiuddin Deobandi =

Indian Muslim scholar

2nd Vice-Chancellor of Darul Uloom Deoband
- In office 1867 to 1869
- Preceded by: Sayyid Muhammad Abid
- Succeeded by: Sayyid Muhammad Abid

4th Vice-Chancellor of Darul Uloom Deoband
- In office 1871 to 1888
- Preceded by: Sayyid Muhammad Abid
- Succeeded by: Sayyid Muhammad Abid

Personal details
- Born: 28 December 1836 Deoband, Saharanpur district, North-Western Provinces
- Died: 22 January 1891 (aged 54) Medina, Hejaz Vilayet, Ottoman Empire
- Resting place: Jannat al-Baqīʿ

Religious life
- Religion: Islam
- Denomination: Sunni Hanafi
- Movement: Deobandi

Rafiuddin Deobandi (1836–1891) was an Indian Muslim scholar, Sufi shaykh, and administrator who served twice as the Vice-Chancellor of Darul Uloom Deoband, holding the office for approximately nineteen years. He was an authorised disciple of Abdul Ghani Mujaddidi Dehlavi in Sufism and later migrated to Medina, where he died in 1890.

== Biography ==
Rafiuddin Deobandi was born in Deoband on 19 Ramadan 1252 AH (28 December 1836 CE). His father, Fariduddin Deobandi, was a religious scholar associated with the Usmani family of Deoband and was a khalifa (authorized disciple) of Sayyid Ahmad Barelvi.

Although he did not complete a formal course of study at a traditional seminary, he possessed substantial knowledge of Persian and Islamic sciences.

In Sufism, he was a khalifa of Abdul Ghani Mujaddidi Dehlavi (d. 1878), who was also a teacher of Rashid Ahmad Gangohi and Muhammad Qasim Nanautavi. He also benefited from Imdadullah Muhajir Makki in spiritual matters. Among his authorised disciples were Aziz-ul-Rahman Usmani, while Murtaza Hasan Chandpuri was among those associated with him as a spiritual adherent.

He served twice as the Vice-Chancellor of Darul Uloom Deoband. In 1284 AH (1867 CE), he assumed the office when Sayyid Muhammad Abid departed for the Hajj pilgrimage. In 1286 AH (1869 CE), Rafiuddin himself left for Hajj and the administration was handed back to Sayyid Muhammad Abid. Approximately three years later, in 1288 AH (1871 CE), he was reappointed Vice-Chancellor after Sayyid Muhammad Abid became occupied with the construction of the Jami Masjid of Deoband and other engagements. He remained in office until 1306 AH (1888 CE), serving in the position for about nineteen years in total.

Several of the early buildings of Darul Uloom Deoband were constructed during his tenure as Vice-Chancellor. Among them was the institution's first building, known as Naw Darah. Its foundation stone was laid on 2 Dhu al-Hijjah 1292 AH (31 December 1875 CE) by Ahmad Ali Saharanpuri, Muhammad Qasim Nanautavi, Rashid Ahmad Gangohi, and Muhammad Mazhar Nanautawi, and the building was completed during Rafiuddin's administration after approximately eight years of construction.

A different account is recorded in Arwah-i Thalatha, according to which the foundation stone was laid by Mianji Munne Shah Deobandi, Sayyid Muhammad Abid Deobandi, Rashid Ahmad Gangohi, and Muhammad Qasim Nanautawi. (Note: Commenting on this discrepancy, a note in Sawanih-e-Qasmi states that the narrative preserved in the institutional records differs considerably from the later oral report recorded in Arwah-i Thalatha. The note argues that, from a historiographical perspective, a written contemporary record carries greater evidentiary weight than a transmission based on oral recollection. It further suggests a possible reconciliation between the two accounts by interpreting precedence in a relative rather than literal sense, proposing that Mianji Munne Shah may have been regarded as foremost in a spiritual capacity, while Ahmad Ali Saharanpuri was foremost among the scholars and Sayyid Muhammad Abid among the members of the consultative council (majlis-e-shura).)

According to Muhammad Tayyib Qasmi, Rafiuddin played a significant role in the intellectual and spiritual development of Darul Uloom Deoband alongside Muhammad Qasim Nanautavi and Rashid Ahmad Gangohi.

In 1306 AH (1888 CE), he migrated to the Harmain Sharifain. He stayed in Mecca for several months before moving to Medina, where he died on 12 Jumada al-Thani 1308 AH (22 January 1891 CE) and was buried in Jannat al-Baqi.
