= Mamluk Ali Nanautawi =

Indian Muslim scholar (1789–1851)

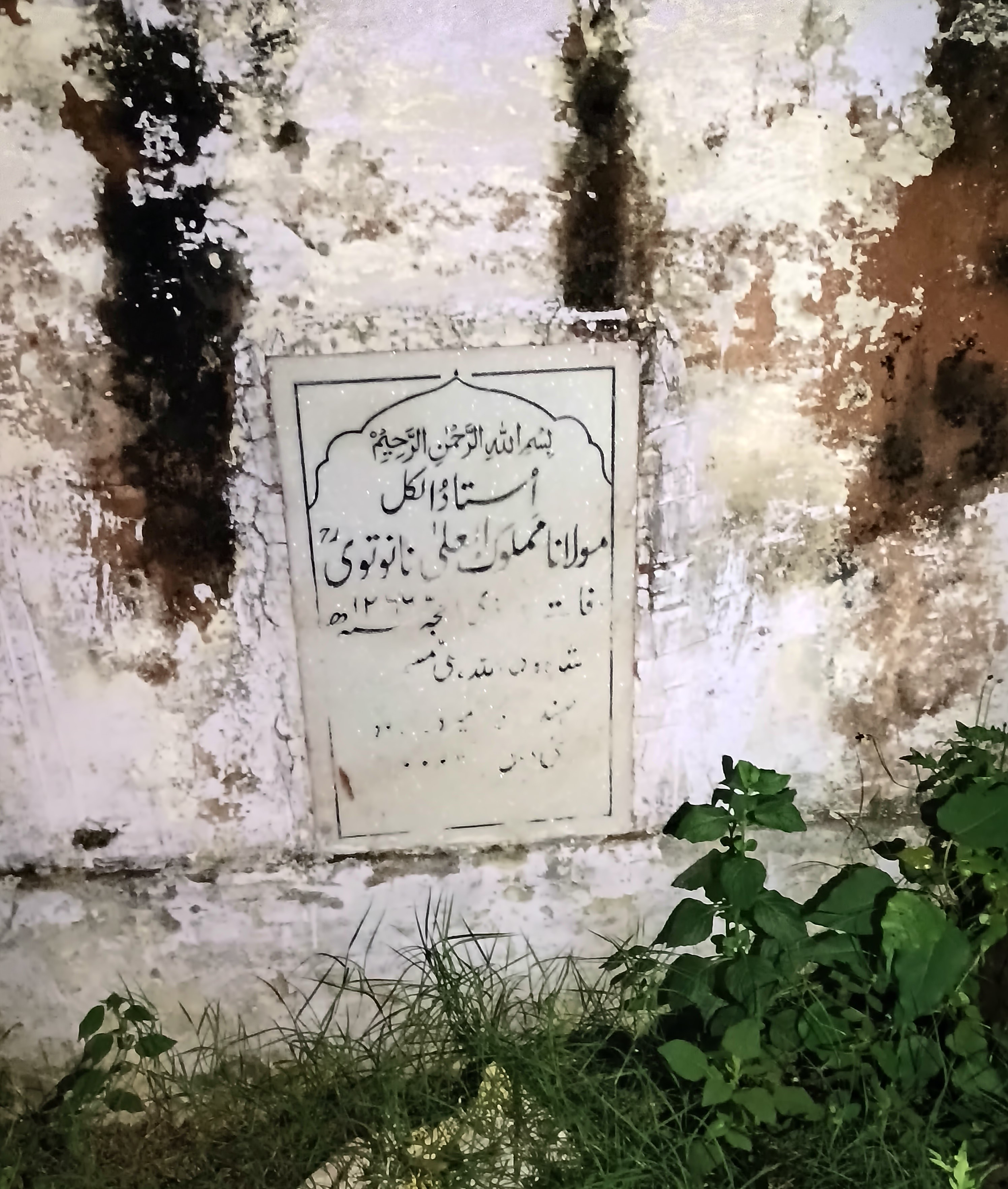
- Gravestone of Nanautawi

Personal life
- Born: 1789 Nanauta, Mughal Empire
- Died: 7 October 1851 (aged 61–62)
- Resting place: Mehdiyan, Delhi, India
- Children: Muhammad Yaqub Nanautawi (son)
- Citizenship: Mughal India
- Relatives: Khalil Ahmad Saharanpuri (grandson)

Religious life
- Religion: Islam
- Denomination: Sunni Islam
- Jurisprudence: Hanafi
- Creed: Maturidi

Muslim leader
- Students: Muhammad Qasim Nanautawi, Syed Ahmad Khan, Nazir Ahmad Dehlvi, Muhammad Yaqub Nanautawi

Mamluk Ali Nanautawi (also written as Mamluk al-Ali Nanautawi) (1789 – 7 October 1851) was an Indian Sunni Muslim scholar who served as the head teacher of Arabic language at the Zakir Husain Delhi College. His notable students include Muhammad Qasim Nanautawi, Rashid Ahmad Gangohi and Muhammad Yaqub Nanautawi.

== Birth and education ==
Mamluk Ali Nanautawi was born in 1789 into the Siddiqi family of Nanauta. Not much has been found on the primary education of Nanautawi. However it is said that he may have completed his primary education from the elders of his family. Nūr al-Hasan Rāshid Kāndhlawi assumes that Nanautawi's studies might have taken place under the supervision of Nanautawi students (Note: Nanautavi students here refers to the students of Mufti Ilāhi Bakhsh who hailed from Nanuata, namely Abdur Rahmān and Abdur Raheem.) of Mufti Ilāhi Bakhsh namely Abdur Rahmān and Abdur Raheem. He completed his middle studies under Mufti Ilāhi Bakhsh Kāndhlawi and Muhammad Qalandar Jalālābadi. He is reported to have studied one discourse with Shah Abdul Aziz. There is another narration stating that he studied from Abdullah Khan Alvi. He completed his higher studies under Rasheed-ud-Dīn Khan.

== Career ==
After completing his studies, Mamluk Ali started teaching in Delhi. In June 1825, he was appointed as a lecturer of Arabic in Zakir Husain Delhi College and was promoted to the post of head teacher on 8 November 1841. He continued as the head teacher of this college throughout his life. Besides teaching the books on rational sciences, Arabic language, and fiqh, he also taught the books of Sihah Sittah.

According to Asir Adrawi, Nanautawi spent his entire career teaching in Delhi. The known scholars of that era are reported to have studied alongside him.

== Students ==
His notable students include:

- Muhammad Qasim Nanautawi, Founder of Darul Uloom Deoband
- Syed Ahmad Khan, Founder of Aligarh Muslim University. (Note: This claim has however been rejected by Nūr al-Hasan Rāshid Kāndhlawi. He says that, "some scholars have stated that Syed Ahmad Khan also studied under Mamlūk Ali, but it is baseless and we could not trace any proof to prove it.)
- Rashid Ahmad Gangohi, Hanafi jurist.
- Muhammad Yaqub Nanautawi, First Principal of Darul Uloom Deoband.
- Nazir Ahmad Dehlvi, Father of Urdu novel.
- Muhammad Mazhar Nanautawi
- Ahmad Ali Saharanpuri, Hadīth scholar
- Zulfiqar Ali Deobandi (Co-founder of Darul Uloom Deoband and father of Mahmud Hasan Deobandi)
- Fazlur Rahman Deobandi (Co-founder of Darul Uloom Deoband and father of Shabbir Ahmad Usmani)
- Muhammad Munir Nanautawi (Former VC of Deoband)
- Zakaullah Dehlvi

== Death and legacy ==
Nanautawi died of jaundice on 7 October 1851 and was buried in Munhadiyan, New Delhi near the graveyard of Shah Waliullah Dehlawi. His son Muhammad Yaqub Nanautawi served as the first Principal of Darul Uloom Deoband. Muhammad Qasim Nanautawi, the founder of Darul Uloom Deoband studied most of his books with Mamluk Ali. Khalil Ahmad Saharanpuri, the author of Badhl al-Majhud, an eighteen volume commentary on Sunan Abu Dawud was Nanautawi's grandson.

Syed Ahmad Khan, the founder of Aligarh Muslim University commended him saying that, "the memory that Mamlūk Ali possessed was so profound that if per chance the entire library of knowledge was lost, Mawlāna would have once again written it all down from the treasure chest of his memory."
