= Muhammad Sahool Bhagalpuri =

Indian Mufti (?-1948)

5th Head Mufti of Darul Uloom Deoband
- In office 1355 AH – 1357 AH
- Preceded by: Muhammad Shafi
- Succeeded by: Kifayatullah Gangohi

Personal life
- Died: 1948 (23 Rajab 1367 AH)
- Resting place: Pureni, Bhagalpur
- Notable work: Fatāwa Suhūliya
- Education: Darul Uloom Deoband

Religious life
- Religion: Islam
- Denomination: Sunni Hanafi
- Movement: Deobandi

Muslim leader
- Students: Tajul Islam

Muhammad Sahool Bhagalpuri (died 1948) was an Indian Muslim scholar and jurist who served as the fifth Head Mufti of Darul Uloom Deoband.

== Biography ==
Muhammad Sahool Bhagalpuri was born in Puraini, Bhagalpur, in a Muslim family that claimed descent from Uthman.

Sahool acquired his primary education at home and then studied with Ashraf Alam. He moved to Madrasa Jām'i al-Ulūm Kanpur where he studied with Ashraf Ali Thanwi and Muhammad Ishāq Burdwāni. He then studied with Muhammad Farooq Chiryakoti at Madrasa Faiz-e-Aam. He went to Hyderabad where he studied logic, philosophy, astronomy, literature and fiqh with Lutfullah Aligarhi and Abd al-Wahhāb Bihāri. From Hyderabad, he moved to Delhi and attended lectures of Nazīr Hussain, and then joined Darul Uloom Deoband where he studied ahadith with Mahmud Hasan Deobandi and graduated from there.

Sahool was appointed a teacher at Darul Uloom Deoband after his graduation. He taught at the seminary for over eight years. He then served Madrasa Azizia, Calcutta Alia Madrasah and Sylhet Government Alia Madrasah as a senior professor of hadith and Head Teacher. In 1920, he was appointed a principal at the Madrasa Alia Shamsul Huda in Patna. Succeeding Muhammad Shafi, he served as the fifth Head Mufti of Darul Uloom Deoband from 1355 AH to 1357 AH and issued 15,185 fatawa during his tenure.

Sahool died in 1948 (27 Rajab 1367 AH) and was buried in Pureni.

== Literary works ==
Dār al-Suhūl, in North Nazimabad, published his book of religious edicts Mahmūd al-Fatāwa, better known as Fatāwa Suhūliya. The old copy of fatawa was given to Muhibbullah, a teacher of Jamia Uloom-ul-Islamia by Sahool's grandson Muhammad Saadullah Usmani. Muhibullah worked on this, and got the fatawa composed and published.

Religious titles
Preceded by Muhammad Shafi	Head Mufti of Darul Uloom Deoband; 1355 AH - 1357 AH	Succeeded by Kifayatullah Gangohi
