= Abdul Hafeez Rahmani =

Indian Islamic scholar and researcher (died 2016)

- عبد الحفیظ رحمانی
- Born: 10 January 1940; Loharsan (now Siddharthnagar district), United Provinces, British India
- Died: 2 August 2016 (aged 76)
- Education: Madrasa Noor al-Uloom, Bahraich; Darul Uloom Deoband (sanad, 1960; Kanpur University (M.A. Urdu)
- Occupations: Islamic scholar, researcher, author, lecturer
- Known for: research and writing in Urdu and Arabic; service as Muhaqqiq (researcher) at Sheikhul Hind Academy, Darul Uloom Deoband
- Movement: Deobandi

Abdul Hafeez Rahmani (عبد الحفیظ رحمانی; 10 January 1940 – 2 August 2016) was an Indian Islamic scholar, researcher and author associated with the Deobandi scholarly milieu. He taught in madrasahs and colleges in Uttar Pradesh, published research and essays in Urdu and Arabic, and served as a researcher (Muhaqqiq) for the Sheikhul Hind Academy affiliated with Darul Uloom Deoband.

== Life and education ==
Rahmani was born in the village of Loharsan (now in Siddharthnagar district). He received early instruction from his father, Hafiz Fateh Muhammad, and from local teachers. He studied at Madrasa Noor al-Uloom, Bahraich, and later completed traditional Dars-e-Nizami studies at Darul Uloom Deoband, receiving a sanad (certificate) in 1960.

According to biographical notices, Rahmani completed modern secondary examinations in the Aligarh area and subsequently obtained an M.A. in Urdu from Kanpur University (Kanpur). (Note: Sources disagree on Rahmani's year of birth. This article follows Nayab Hasan Qasmi (10 January 1940) for the date of birth while noting that other reference works (for example the Arabic entry in Mausūʿa Ulama-e-Deoband) give 1936 as the year of birth; both published sources are cited in the article.)

== Career ==
Rahmani contributed regularly to Urdu and Arabic journals and periodicals associated with the Deobandi milieu and other Urdu press. During his career he edited and wrote for a number of monthlies and weeklies and presented papers at seminars and conferences.

He taught at various madrasahs and also worked as a college Urdu lecturer in the Siddharthnagar region for many years. Later he served as a researcher (Muhaqqiq) at the Sheikhul Hind Academy, Darul Uloom Deoband; his tenure there is recorded for the mid-2000s (2004–2006).

Rahmani was active in district-level organisational work with bodies such as Jamiat Ulama-e-Hind and took part in public meetings, conferences and campaigns in the Basti / Siddharthnagar area.

== Literary works ==
Rahmani authored and edited several books and many articles. Selected titles reported in bibliographies and tributes include:

- Taurat aur Yahood Apne Āiney Mein
- Bible aur Nabi-i Akhir-uz-Zamān
- Aasar-e-Imam Aʿzam Abū Hanīfah
- Al-Imam Nanotvi ke Mujahidānah Kārnāmey
- Tarikh-e-Qiyam Madaris: Ek Tareekhi Jaiza
- Tasawwuf ki Haqiqat aur us ke Masā'il
- Zikr-e-Ilāhi: Shari'i Haqeeqat
- Ghair-Muqallideen ka Aaina
- Marzā Ghulam Ahmad Qadiyani ke Muraqbat-e-Nubuwwat ke Khud o Khal
- Sawaneh: Hazrat Shah Abdul Halim Junpuri
- Sawneh: Hazrat Maulana Zain-ud-Din Kandhlavi
- Pasandeeda Murshid
- Khādim-e-Millat Hayāt wa Khidmāt
- Sayed Maudūdi: Ek Jami' Ta'āruf
- Baani-e-Darul Uloom Deoband aur Tarīkhi Haqāiq
- Jadīd Fikri Buhrān: Nishāndihī aur Hal

== Death ==
Rahmani died on 2 August 2016. Regional memorial accounts describe his funeral and burial in his native area.
