= Mahmud Deobandi =

Muslim scholar (?-1886)

Mullah Mahmud Deobandi

Personal life
- Died: 1886 Deoband
- Resting place: Deoband
- Known for: being first teacher of Darul Uloom Deoband

Religious life
- Religion: Islam
- Denomination: Sunni
- Jurisprudence: Hanafi
- Movement: Deobandi

Muslim leader
- Students: Mahmud Hasan Deobandi, Ashraf Ali Thanwi, Azizur Rahman Usmani

Mahmud Deobandi (also known as Mulla Mahmud) (died 1886) was a Muslim scholar who became the first teacher at Darul Uloom Deoband. His most notable student is Mahmud Hasan Deobandi.

== Biography ==
Mahmud was a fellow of Muhammad Qasim Nanautawi, the founder of Darul Uloom Deoband. He studied ahadith with Shah Abdul Ghani Dehlawi son of Shah Waliullah Dehlawi. In 1866, when Darul Uloom Deoband was established, he was appointed as a teacher. He taught in Darul Uloom Deoband for twenty years until he died in 1886. He is buried in Deoband.

His students include Mahmud Hasan Deobandi, Ashraf Ali Thanwi and Azizur Rahman Usmani.
