= Manazir Ahsan Gilani =

Indian Muslim scholar (1892–1956)

Personal life
- Born: 1 October 1892 Gilani, Asthawan, Patna district, Bengal Presidency
- Died: 5 June 1956 (aged 63) Gilani, Nalanda, Bihar
- Region: India
- Main interest(s): Hadith, History, Fiqh, Urdu Literature
- Notable work(s): Sawanih-e-Abu Dharr Ghifari, Sawanih-e-Qasmi, Tadwin-e-Hadith, Muqaddama Tadwin-e-Fiqh, Imam Abu Hanifa Ki Siyasi Zindagi
- Education: Darul Uloom Deoband

Religious life
- Religion: Islam
- Denomination: Sunni
- Jurisprudence: Hanafi

Muslim leader
- Influenced: Muhammad Hamidullah

Manazir Ahsan Gilani (1 October 1892 – 5 June 1956) was an Indian Sunni Islamic scholar and former Dean of the Faculty of Theology at Osmania University. Some of his notable works include Tadwin-e-Hadith, Muqaddama Tadwin-e-Fiqh, Sawanih-e-Abu Dharr Ghifari, and Sawanih-e-Qasmi. Muhammad Hamidullah, a historian and hadith researcher, was among his students.

== Birth and education ==
Manazir Ahsan Gilani was born on the 9th of Rabiul Awwal 1310 H (1 October 1892) in a small village in Asthawan block in Patna district (now Nalanda district) of Bihar. The place is now known as Gilani after his title. His father’s name was Abul Khair Gilani. Their Arab ancestors reached the Indian subcontinent about three centuries ago via Iran and finally settled in a village which came to be known as Gilani (based on surname of their ancestors).

His elementary education was at home and then he stayed in Tonk, Rajasthan for six years studying with Hakeem Barakaat Ahmad. Thereafter, he was admitted in Darul Uloom Deoband (1912). His other teachers at Darul Uloom Deoband include: Maulana Shabir Ahmad Usmani, Mufti Azizur Rahman Usmani, Maulana Habibur Rahman Usmani and Maulana Syed Ashghar Hussain Deobandi. At Darul Uloom Deoband he studied Sahih al-Bukhari and Jami` at-Tirmidhi with Mahmud Hasan Deobandi and also accepted him as his spiritual mentor. He studied Sahih Muslim with Anwar Shah Kashmiri, Sunan Abu Dawud with Shabbir Ahmad Usmani and Asghar Hussain Deobandi, Sunan an-Nasa'i with Hussain Ahmad Madani, Ibn Majah with Ghulam Rasool Hazarwi and Muwatta Imam Malik with Azizur Rahman Usmani.

== Career ==
Gilani was appointed Dean of the Faculty of Theology in Osmania University, remaining there for 25 years. His students included Muhammad HamidUllah and Ghulam Muhammad Rabbani. In 1948, he retired from Osmania University and returned to his homeland of Gilani, where he devoted most of his time to writing.

== Literary works ==
Gilani’s books include:

- An-Nabiul khaatim (The Last Prophet)
- Sawanih-e-Abu Dharr Ghifari (Biography of Abu Dharr Ghifari)
- Imam Abu Hanifa ki Siasi Zindagi (Political life of Imam Abu Hanifa)
- Tadhkira-e-hadhrat Shah Wali Allah (Remembrance of Shah Wali Allah)
- Savanih-e-Qasmi - Biography of Muhammad Qasim Nanautawi
- Pak wa Hind mein musalmanon ka nizam-e ta'leem wa tarbiat (System of Education and Edification of Muslims in India)
- Islami ma'ashiyyat (Islamic Economics)
- Tadween-e-Hadith (Compilation of Hadith)
- Ad-deenul qayyim (Established Perfect System)
- Tadween-e-Qur'an (Compilation of Quran)
- Mugaddima-e tadween-e-fiqh (Compilation of Fiqh)
- Maqaalaat-e-Ahsani (Sayings of Ahsan)
- Tadhkeer bi Surat Al-Kahf (Mention of Sura al-Kahaf)
- Musalmano ki Firqabandion ka Afsanaa (Tale of Sectarianism among Muslims)
- Sulooq-o-Aadaab (Behaviour and Manners)
- Islam aur Hindu mazhab ki baaz mushtarik ta’leemaat (Some Common Teachings of Islam and Hinduism)
- Arz-e-Ahsan (Excellent Presentation)
- Agosh mouj ka aik dar tabinda ya Islami Hind ke toofani ahad mein Khuda ka aik wafadar bandah
- Duniya ke do bhai aur deen ke do bhai (Two Brothers of the Duniya and Two Brothers of the Deen)
- Dajjaali fitne ke numaya khadd-o-khaal (Salient Features of Dajjal’s Fitna), translated into Arabic by Arif Jameel Mubarakpuri under the title Al Fitna-tud-Dajjāliyyah wa Malāmihuha al-bārizah wa Ishārātuha Fī Sūrati al-Kahf
- Ihata-e Daar al-‘Uloom mein bite hue din" (Days Spent in the Premises of Dar-al-‘Uloom)
- Hazar(1000) saal pehley (Thousand (1000) Year Earlier)

== Death and legacy ==
Gilani suffered from heart problems from 9th November, 1953. After a second heart attack in March 1954, he was shifted to Patna Hospital and was being treated by Ahmad Abdul Hayy. Gilani was prohibited from writing and reading. He died on 5 June 1956 at his native place Gilani, Bihar. His funeral prayer was led by Faseeh Ahmad Asthanwi.

On 1st and 2nd of December 2018, the Institute of Objective Studies, New Delhi organised a two-day national conference at the A.N. Sinha Institute of Social Studies, Patna, on “The Life and Contributions of Maulana Manazir Ahsan Gilani”.

Gilani is often referred by the Islamic scholars as: Muhaqqiq-e-Islam (the researcher of Islam), Sultanul Qalam (King of the Pen), Mutakallim-e-Millat (The Philosopher of the Nation).

Abu Salman Shahjahanpuri wrote Maulana Syed Manazir Ahsan Gilani : Shakhsiyat Aur Sawaneh (Manazir Ahsan Gilani: Personality and Biography).

Dr Fahim Akhtar Nadwi wrote " Maulana Manazir Ahsan Gilani : Hayat, Khidmaat aur Ifkar"

== See also ==
- List of Deobandis
