= Fazlur Rahman Usmani =

Indian Muslim scholar

Mawlānā Fazlur Rahmān Usmānī

Personal life
- Born: 1831 Deoband, India
- Died: 15 June 1907 (aged 75–76)
- Children: Aziz-ur-Rahman Usmani, Habibur Rahman Usmani, Shabbir Ahmad Usmani
- Education: Delhi College
- Relatives: Atiqur Rahman Usmani (grandson)

Religious life
- Religion: Islam
- Founder of: Darul Uloom Deoband

Muslim leader
- Teacher: Mamluk Ali Nanautawi

Fazlur Rahmān Usmānī (1831 – 15 June 1907) was an Indian Muslim scholar and poet who co-founded the Darul Uloom Deoband. He was the father of the scholars Aziz-ur-Rahman Usmani and Shabbir Ahmad Usmani. His grandson Atiqur Rahman Usmani was the founder of Nadwatul Musannifeen.

== Biography ==
Usmānī was born in 1831 in Deoband. He was an alumnus of Delhi College where he had studied under Mamluk Ali Nanautawi. He was a Deputy Inspector of Schools in the Education Department. He co-founded Darul Uloom Deoband along with Muhammad Qasim Nanautawi, Sayyid Muhammad Abid and others. He remained a member of the executive council of Darul Uloom Deoband throughout his life.

Usmānī died on 15 June 1907. His most elder son was Aziz-ur-Rahman Usmani, who served as the first Grand Mufti of Darul Uloom Deoband. His another son, Shabbir Ahmad Usmani was among the founding figures of Pakistan. His grandson Atiqur Rahman Usmani co-founded Nadwatul Musannifeen and the All India Muslim Majlis-e-Mushawarat.

== Literary works ==
Usmānī's Persian poem Qissa-e Gham-e Diban is considered as a historical document related to Deoband.

== See more ==
- List of Deobandis

== Bibliography ==
- Rahmān, Abu Ukāshah (January 2019). "Hazrat Maulana Fazlur Rahmān Usmānī". Tārīkh ke qātil (in Urdu) (January 2019 ed.). Hyderabad: A P Offset Printers. pp. 44–53.
