= Battle of Shamli =

1857 battle in the Indian Rebellion of 1857

- Part of the Indian Rebellion of 1857
Date	10 May 1857
Location	Thana Bhawan, Shamli district, India
Result	British victory

Belligerents
Local Muslim Militias	East India Company

Commanders and leaders
Haji Imdadullah Muhajir Makki; Rashid Ahmed Gangohi; Muhammad Qasim Nanautavi; Muhammad Yaqub Nanautawi; Najib Ali Choudhury; Muhammad Zamin †; Muhammad Munir Nanautavi	unknown

Strength
unknown	unknown

Casualties and losses
unknown	unknown

The Battle of Shamli or Battle of Thana Bhawan was fought on 10 May 1857 between the forces of Haji Imdadullah Muhajir Makki and the East India Company. It was part of the Indian Rebellion of 1857.

On 10 May 1857, local Muslims under the leadership of Haji Imdadullah Muhajir Makki gathered at Thana Bhawan, a small town in the Shamli district in current-day Uttar Pradesh, around 120 km from Delhi, to stage a violent protest against Company rule in India. The clergy won the day in what came to be known as the Battle of Shamli and established a government mostly in the Shamli district. Muhammad Qasim Nanautavi was the commander-in-chief and Rashid Ahmad Gangohi was the Qadi of the state, but soon after the killing of Muhammad Zamin, the situation turned in favour of the East India Company. The arrest of Bahadur Shah Zafar, one of the main leaders of the Rebellion of 1857, followed. Shamli fell to the British, and the town of Thana Bhawan was largely destroyed by the East India Company Army.

== Bibliography ==
- Najmul Hasan Thanwi. Maidan-e-Shamli-o-Thana Bhawan awr Sarfaroshan-e-Islam (in Urdu). Thana Bhawan: Idara Talifat-e-Ashrafia.
- Role of Indian Arabic Writers in the Freedom Movement of India, p. 67–92
