= Fazl-e-Haque Deobandi =

3rd rector of Darul Uloom Deoband (d. 1898)

Haji Fazl-e-Haq Deobandi
- فضلِ حق دیوبندی
- Born: Sayyid Fazl-e-Haque; Unknown
- Died: 1898 (1315 AH); Jhalawar, Rajputana Agency, British India (now Rajasthan, India)
- Occupations: Sufi, administrator
- Known for: Third Rector of Darul Uloom Deoband
- Notable work: Biography of Muhammad Qasim Nanautavi (unpublished)
- Movement: Deobandi

Fazl-e-Haq Deobandi (died 1898) was an Indian administrator associated with Darul Uloom Deoband. He was involved in the seminary's early administration and briefly served as its third rector (Muhtamim) from 1893 to 1894. He later moved to Jhalawar, where he lived until his death in 1898.

== Early life and background ==
Fazl-e-Haq Deobandi was born into a Sayyid family of the Rizvi lineage in Deoband. He was a disciple of Muhammad Qasim Nanautavi, the co-founder of Darul Uloom Deoband. Before joining the seminary, he worked for a long period in the Saharanpur government education department. His administrative skills played a crucial role in the early functioning of Darul Uloom Deoband.

== Role at Darul Uloom Deoband ==
Fazl-e-Haq Deobandi was among the founding members of the advisory council (Majlis-e-Shura) of Darul Uloom Deoband and remained a member from 1283 AH to 1311 AH (1866–1893). He was responsible for administrative tasks and played an important role in the seminary's early operations. After the establishment of the seminary, the first public donation appeal was issued on 19 Muharram 1283 AH under his supervision as the head administrator (Sarbarāh-e-Kār) of the institution. This was before he was appointed as the rector (Muhtamim) of Darul Uloom Deoband.

=== Appointment as rector ===
In 1893 (Sha'ban 1310 AH), following the resignation of Sayyid Muhammad Abid as the rector (Muhtamim) of Darul Uloom Deoband, Deobandi was appointed as his successor. He served in this capacity for approximately one year before resigning in Dhu al-Qa'dah 1311 AH (1894 AD). Prior to this appointment, he had served the institution for many years as the head administrator under the leadership of Abid.

== Literary contributions ==
Deobandi wrote a detailed biography of his teacher, Muhammad Qasim Nanautavi, which was never published. However, excerpts from this manuscript were frequently cited in Sawanih-e-Qasimi, a biography of Nanautavi authored by Manazir Ahsan Gilani. The manuscript was systematically arranged, covering Nanautavi's life from birth to death, including details about his illness, funeral, and condolences received.

== Later life and death ==
After resigning from Darul Uloom Deoband, Fazl-e-Haq Deobandi moved to the princely state of Jhalawar in present-day Rajasthan, where he lived until his death in 1898 (1315 AH).

== Family ==
His son, Zahoor-ul-Haq Deobandi, became a senior teacher at Mazahir Uloom Saharanpur. Other family members settled in Jaipur and Bhopal.

== See also ==
- List of Deobandis
