= Syed Mehboob Rizwi =

Indian historian (1911–1979)

Maulana Syed Mehboob Rizwi

Personal life
- Born: 1911
- Died: 1979 (aged 67–68)
- Region: India
- Main interest(s): History, Urdu literature
- Notable work: Tarikh Darul Uloom Deoband
- Education: Manba-ul-Uloom Gulaothi, Darul Uloom Deoband

Religious life
- Religion: Islam
- Denomination: Sunni
- Jurisprudence: Hanafi
- Movement: Deobandi

Syed Mehboob Rizwi (1911–1979) was an Indian Sunni Islamic scholar, author and historian, best known for Tarikh Darul Uloom Deoband, his two volume Urdu work on the history of Darul Uloom Deoband.

== Biography ==
Syed Mehboob Rizwi was born in 1911 in a Rizwi Sayyid family in Deoband. He studied Islamic sciences at the Madrasa Manba-ul-Ulum Gulaothi and Darul Uloom Deoband.

Rizwi served different educational and research departments of the Darul Uloom Deoband from 1933 until he died. He was also office in-charge of seminary's record room.

Rizwi wrote for different journals and newspapers including, Weekly Al-Jamiat, Monthly Al-Burhan, Monthly Molvi and Monthly Deen-o-Dunya of Delhi, Monthly Ma'arif, Azamgarh, Monthly Haadi, Deoband, Monthly Shams al-Mashayikh, Bhopal, Monthly Shams-ul-Islam, Amritsar, and Bi-monthly Asia, Lahore. He also wrote for the Darul Uloom, the monthly journal of Darul Uloom Deoband.

Rizwi died in 1979.

== Literary works ==
Books include:

- Maktoobat-e-Nabvi
- Tarikh Darul Uloom Deoband (The History of Darul Uloom Deoband, translated to English by Murtaz Husain F. Quraishi).
- Aab-e-ZamZam
- Makateeb-e-Hijaz
- Tazkirah Saadat-e-Rizwiyyah
- Tarikh-e-Deoband

== See also ==
- List of Indian writers
- List of Deobandis
- Antony Theodore
- Tapan Kumar Pradhan
- Asghar Ali Engineer

== Bibliography ==
- Nayab Hasan Qasmi. "Syed Mehboob Rizwi". Darul Uloom Deoband ka Sahāfati Manzarnāma (in Urdu) (2013 ed.). Deoband: Idara Tahqeeq-e-Islami. pp. 167–170.
