= Sayyid Muhammad Abid =

Indian Muslim Scholar

1st Vice Chancellor of Darul Uloom Deoband
- In office 1866–1867
- Preceded by: "office established"
- Succeeded by: Rafiuddin Deobandi

3rd Vice Chancellor of Darul Uloom Deoband
- In office 1869–1871
- Preceded by: Rafiuddin Deobandi
- Succeeded by: Rafiuddin Deobandi

5th Vice Chancellor of Darul Uloom Deoband
- In office 1890–1892
- Preceded by: Rafiuddin Deobandi
- Succeeded by: Fazl-e-Haque Deobandi

Personal life
- Born: 1834 Deoband, Mughal India
- Died: 1912 (aged 77–78) Deoband, British India
- Citizenship: Mughal Empire (1834 – 1857); British India (1857 – 1912)
- Notable work: Foundation of Darul Uloom Deoband

Religious life
- Religion: Islam
- Denomination: Sunni Islam
- Founder of: Darul Uloom Deoband
- Jurisprudence: Hanafi
- Creed: Maturidi
- Movement: Deobandi

Muslim leader
- Disciple of: Imdadullah Muhajir Makki and Karim Bakhsh Rampuri
- Disciples: Aziz-ur-Rahman Usmani

Sayyid Muhammad Abid (also known as Hāji Abid Hussain) (1834–1912) was an Indian Muslim scholar who co-founded Darul Uloom Deoband. He was the Vice Chancellor of Darul Uloom Deoband for three times.

== Early life and education ==
Abid Hussain was born in 1834 in Deoband, Mughal India, in a family having descendancy to Hussain thorough Ja'far al-Sadiq. Aged 7, he studied Quran and Persian language in Deoband. He went to Delhi for higher education. In the meantime, he had to return to Deoband because of his father's health issues. However, his father died a few days later which made him to discontinue his studies. He was authorized in Tasawwuf by Imdadullah Muhajir Makki and Karim Bakhsh Rampuri.

== Career ==
Abid Hussain was one of the founding figures of Darul Uloom Deoband. At first, he differed from the rest of the founding members about the separation of "madrasa" from the Jama Masjid, and opined that the "madrasa" should remain intact in the Jama Masjid. He changed his opinion later and was the second person who laid the foundation of new building of Darul Uloom Deoband, after the first stone was laid by Miyanji Munne Shah. The sale-deed of the land where the new building of Deoband seminary was constructed is named in his favor.

He served the Deoband seminary as vice chancellor for three times. First, from its inception in 1866 to 1867. The second time from 1869 to 1871 and the third time from 1890 to 1892. He was also a member of the first governing body of Darul Uloom Deoband.

== Death and legacy ==
Abid Hussain died in 1912 in Deoband. His disciples include Aziz-ur-Rahman Usmani.
