= Usmani family of Deoband =

Family in Deoband

The Usmani family of Deoband are a prominent family based primarily in the town of Deoband in India. The notable people of this family include Fazlur Rahman Usmani, Mahmud Hasan Deobandi, Azizur Rahman Usmani and Shabbir Ahmad Usmani.

Fazlur Rahman Usmani, Nehal Ahmad, Mehtab Ali and Zulfiqar Ali Deobandi from the family were co-founders of Darul Uloom Deoband. Atiqur Rahman Usmani, a member of this family, co-founded Nadwatul Musannifeen and All India Muslim Majlis-e-Mushawarat.

== History ==
Ubaid Iqbal Asim in his work Mawlāna Zafar Ahmad: Life and works, discussing the background of Usmanis in Deoband, mentions that, "one of the famous saintly figures that lived in Deoband is Khwajah Abul Wafā Usmāni, who was a cousin brother of Jalāluddīn Kabīr al-Awliya Pānipati". He had settled in Deoband in the eighth hijri century. Asim asserts that, most of the Usmanis in Deoband are the successors of Abul Wafā Usmāni.

Ten generations later, Lutfullah was born in the family of Abul Wafā Usmāni. He held the position of treasurer in the court of Shah Jahan.

== Lineage ==
The lineage of Abu al-Wafā Usmāni is, Abu al-Wafā ibn Ubayd Allāh ibn Husayn ibn Abd al-Razzāq ibn Abd al-Hakīm ibn Hasan ibn Abd Allāh ibn Ya'qub ibn Īsa ibn Ismā'īl ibn Muḥammad ibn Abu Bakr ibn Ali ibn Usman ibn Abd Allāh Hirmāni ibn Abd al-Allāh Gārzūni ibn Abd al-Azīz III ibn Khālid ibn Walīd ibn Abd al-Azīz II ibn Abd al-Rahman al-Akbar ibn Abd Allāh II ibn Abd al-Azīz ibn Abd Allāh ibn Amr ibn Uthman. This lineage is in accordance with what Arab genealogists have recorded in works regarding the descendants of Amr ibn Uthman. For instance, in the Kitab Nasb Quraysh by Mus'ab ibn 'Abd Allah al-Zubayri, Amr ibn Uthman is recorded as having a great-grandson named Abd al-Aziz and a great-great grandson named Abd Allah, thus reinforcing the authenticity of the lineage of the family.

== People ==
=== Fazlur Rahman Usmani ===
Fazlur Rahman Usmani lived between 1831 and 15 June 1907. He was one of the co-founders of Darul Uloom Deoband. His nasab (patronymic) is: Fazlur Rahmān ibn Murād Bakhsh ibn Ghulām Muḥammad ibn Ghulām Nabī ibn Lutfullāh ibn Muḥammad Ashiq ibn Farīd Usmāni ibn Abu Muḥammad ibn Muḥammad Hāfiz ibn Muḥammad ibn Abd al-Mālik ibn Abd al-Azīz ibn Abd al-Hakīm ibn Sa'īd ibn Muḥammad ibn Fazlullāh ibn Abul Wafā Usmāni.

His sons include Azizur Rahman Usmani, Habibur Rahman Usmani, and Shabbir Ahmad Usmani. Atiqur Rahman Usmani, the co-founder of Nadwatul Musannifeen and All India Muslim Majlis-e-Mushawarat was his grandson. Shams Naved Usmani is another grandson of Usmāni. Kafilur Rahman Nishat Usmani, who was the grandson of Azizur Rahman Usmani, translated Fatawa 'Alamgiri into Urdu language.

After the creation of Pakistan in 1947, Shabbir Ahmad Usmani hoisted its flag in Karachi in the presence of Muhammad Ali Jinnah and other All India Muslim League leaders.

=== Shaykh Fateh Ali ===
Fateh Ali was the grandfather of Mahmud Hasan Deobandi. He had three sons, Mahtab Ali Deobandi, Masood Ali and Zulfiqar Ali Deobandi. Mehtab Ali and Zulfiqar Ali were also among the co-founders of Darul Uloom Deoband. Zulfiqar Ali's son Mahmud Hasan Deobandi became the first student who studied in Darul Uloom Deoband.

=== Karamat Hussain ===
Karamat Hussain is known to have established a madrassa at his home in Deoband. The teacher in this madrassa was Mahtab Ali Deobandi, the uncle of Mahmud Hasan Deobandi. This madrassa remained functioning until the foundation of Darul Uloom Deoband. Muhammad Qasim Nanautawi studied there under the supervision of Mehtab Ali.

Nehal Ahmad, the son of Karamat Hussain, was one of co-founders of Darul Uloom Deoband. He was the brother-in-law of Muhammad Qasim Nanautawi. Nehal had a son, Lateef Ahmad, who was married to the sister of Ashraf Ali Thanwi. Zafar Ahmad Usmani was the son of Lateef Ahmad, and a nephew of Thanwi.

Zafar Ahmad Usmani hoisted the flag of Pakistan in Dhaka in 1947 in the presence of Muhammad Ali Jinnah and other All India Muslim League leaders.

=== Miyānji Shukrullah ===
Shukrullah was among the fore-fathers of Muhammad Shafi. The family also claims the Usmani descent, however they do not possess the complete lineage. Rafi Usmani and Taqi Usmani are both sons of Muhammad Shafi, who was one of active members of Pakistan Movement.

Rafi Usmani has mentioned the incomplete lineage in the biography of his father entitled Hayāt Mufti Azam as, "Muhammad Shafi ibn Muhammad Yasīn ibn Khalīfa Tehseen Ali ibn Imām Ali ibn Karīmullāh ibn Khayrullāh ibn Shukrullah". According to Rafi Usmani, Karīmullāh had moved to Deoband in 1183 AH. Shafi Usmani's father, Muhammad Yasīn Usmāni was among the earliest students of Darul Uloom Deoband. Yasīn's students include Asghar Hussain Deobandi, Shabbir Ahmad Usmani and Sanaullah Amritsari.

== See also ==
- Siddiqi family of Nanauta
- Yasir Nadeem al Wajidi

== Bibliography ==
- Ubaid, Iqbal Asim (2001). Mawlāna Zafar Ahmad: Hayāt-o-Khidmāt [Mawlāna Zafar Ahmad: Life and works] (PhD). Aligarh Muslim University.
- Anjum Usmani (2011). "Kahāni Mujhy Likhti Hai". Kahin Kuchh Kho Gaya Hai. انجم عثمانى ؛. pp. 7–27. ISBN 978-81-8042-230-0.
- Usmani, Muhammad Rafi. Hayāt Mufti Azam [Life of the Grand Mufti] (in Urdu) (May 2005 ed.). Karachi: Idāratul Ma'ārif.
