= Aziz-ul-Rahman Usmani =

First Head Mufti of Darul Uloom Deoband (1858/59-1928)

Mufti-e-Azam Aziz-ul-Rahman Usmani

1st Head Mufti of Darul Uloom Deoband.
- In office 1890–1927
- Preceded by: position established
- Succeeded by: Izaz Ali Amrohi

Personal details
- Born: 1858 or 1859
- Died: 1928 Deoband, British India
- Children: Atiqur Rahman Usmani
- Parent: Fazlur Rahman Usmani (father)
- Relatives: Usmani family of Deoband
- Education: Darul Uloom Deoband

Personal life
- Notable work: Fatawa Darul Uloom Deoband

Religious life
- Religion: Islam
- Denomination: Sunni

Muslim leader
- Students: Shah Abdul Wahhab, Badre Alam Merathi

Aziz-ul-Rahman Usmani (also written as Azizur Rahman Usmani; died 1928) was an Indian Sunni Muslim scholar who served as first Head Mufti of Darul Uloom Deoband. He is best known for his Fatawa Darul Uloom Deoband. His brother was Shabbir Ahmad Usmani.

== Biography ==
Aziz-ul-Rahman Usmani was born in 1275 AH (corresponding to 1858-1859 in the Gregorian calendar) into the Usmani family of Deoband. He graduated from the Darul Uloom Deoband in 1295 AH. His teachers included Muhammad Qasim Nanautawi, Mahmud Hasan Deobandi and Muhammad Yaqub Nanautawi. He was an authorized disciple of Muhammad Rafi-ud-Din in Sufism.

Usmani was appointed the Head Mufti of the Darul Ifta of Darul Uloom Deoband after its inception and he headed it until 1927 after which he moved to Dabhel. His juristic rulings were compiled in twelve volumes by Zafeeruddin Miftahi and were published between 1962 and 1972 as Fatawa Darul Uloom Deoband. Muhammad Shafi also compiled selected fatawa of Usmani and published them as Aziz al-Fatawa. According to Syed Mehboob Rizwi, Usmani issued 37,561 fatawas between 1330 and 1346 AH (1911–12 and 1927-1928).

Usmani resigned from Darul Uloom Deoband along with Anwar Shah Kashmiri in 1927 and moved to Jamia Islamia Talimuddin (Dabhel) and taught Sahih al-Bukhari there. In Dabhel, his health deteriorated and he returned to Deoband, where he died in 1928. His funeral prayer was led by Sayyid Asghar Hussain Deobandi and he was buried in the Qasmi cemetery of Darul Uloom.

Usmani issued verdicts with the title of Head Mufti of India, along with the title of Head Mufti of Darul Uloom Deoband.

== Legacy ==
In 2011, Abu Tamim completed his PhD thesis, 'Mufti Azeezur Rahman Ki Fiqhee Khidmat,' under the supervision of Mohammad Habibullah at Aligarh Muslim University.

== See also ==
- List of Deobandis

== Bibliography ==
- Rizwi, Syed Mehboob. Tarikh Darul Uloom Deoband [History of the Dar al-Ulum Deoband]. Vol. 2. Translated by Murtaz Husain F Quraishi (1981 ed.). Deoband: Darul Uloom Deoband.
- ULLAH, MOHAMMED (2018). The Contribution of Deoband School to Hanafi Fiqh A Study of Its Response to Modern Issues and Challenges (Phd thesis). Centre for Federal Studies, Jamia Hamdard University. pp. 113–115. hdl:10603/326073.

Religious titles
Preceded by "office established"	First Head Mufti of Darul Uloom Deoband; 1890/1892 - 1927	Succeeded by Izaz Ali Amrohi
