= Yaqub Nanautawi =

Indian Islamic scholar (1833–1884)

Muhammad Yaqub Nanautawi

1st Principal and Sheikh al-Hadith of Darul Uloom Deoband
- In office 1866–1883
- Preceded by: Office established
- Succeeded by: Syed Ahmad Dehlavi

Personal details
- Born: July 1, 1833 or July 2, 1883 Nanauta, British India
- Died: 1884 (aged 50–51) Nanauta, British India
- Parent: Mamluk Ali Nanautawi (father)
- Relatives: Khalil Ahmad Saharanpuri (nephew)
- Occupation: Islamic scholar

Military service
- Years of service: 1857
- Battles/wars: Indian War of Independence: Battle of Shamli

Religious life
- Religion: Islam
- Denomination: Sunni
- Jurisprudence: Hanafi
- Creed: Maturidi
- Movement: Deobandi

Yaqub Nanautawi (1833–1884) was an Indian Islamic scholar, and one of the earliest teachers of Islamic Madrassa in Deoband, famously called Darul Uloom Deoband in India. He was the first principal of Darul Uloom Deoband.

== Early life and education ==
Yaqub Nanautawi was born on either July 1, 1833, or July 2, 1883, in the Siddiqi family of Nanauta and was the son of Islamic scholar, Mamluk Ali Nanautawi. coinciding 13 Safar 1249 AH in British India, in the town of Nanauta, part of the Saharanpur District of the modern province of Uttar Pradesh, India. His father was one of the senior Muslim scholars of India at the time, and the head-teacher of Delhi Colleges.

Nanautawi studied most of the Islamic sciences under his father and Shah Abd al-Ghani Mujaddidi. His other teachers included Ahmad Ali Saharanpuri. He was trained in tasawwuf under Haji Imdadullah and received khilafah (authorization) from him in the Chishti, Naqshbandi, Qadiri, and Suhrawardi orders.

== Career ==
In 1852, Muhammad Yaqub was appointed as a teacher in Government College Ajmer. At the recommendation of the College principal, he was offered the post of Deputy collector, which he rejected. He was transferred to Banaras, and later promoted to the post of Deputy Inspector, Saharanpur.

In 1866, Muhammad Yaqub was appointed as the principal of Darul Uloom Deoband. Concerning his appointment in the Deoband seminary, Muhammad Miyan Deobandi writes that, "Seeing the increase in students day to day, it became a concern to get good teachers and thus Maulana Muhammad Yaqub was called to be the principal who was then teaching either in Ajmer or somewhere else."

Students of Muhammad Yaqub include most of the second-generation Islamic scholars such as Mahmud Hasan Deobandi, Aziz-ur-Rahman Usmani, Sayyid Mumtaz Ali, Hafiz Muhammad Ahmad, Khalil Ahmad Saharanpuri and Ashraf Ali Thanwi.

Yaqub authored Sawaneh Umri Hazrat Maulana Qasim Nanutawi, a biography of Qasim Nanautawi which was translated into Arabic by Arif Jameel Mubarakpuri as Al-Imām Muhammad Qasim An-Nanawtawi Kama Ra’aituhu.

== Death and legacy ==
Muhammad Yaqub Nanautavi died of cholera at age 51 in 1884 and was buried in his hometown, Nanauta.

== Family life ==
Muhammad Yaqub was maternal uncle of the Hadith scholar Khalil Ahmad Saharanpuri.
