= Shabbir Ahmad Usmani =

Pakistani Islamic scholar (1887–1949)

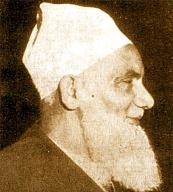

Ameer of Jamiat Ulema-e-Islam
- In office 1945–1949
- Preceded by: Position established
- Succeeded by: Zafar Ahmad Usmani

Member of the Constituent Assembly of Pakistan
- In office 11 August 1947 – 13 December 1949

Member of the Constituent Assembly of India
- In office November 1946 – 11 August 1947

Personal life
- Born: 11 October 1887 Bijnor, North-Western Provinces, British India
- Died: 13 December 1949 (aged 62) Bahawalpur, Bahawalpur State, Pakistan
- Resting place: Islamia Science College (Karachi), Karachi, Sindh, Pakistan
- Parent: Fazlur Rahman Usmani (father)
- Citizenship: British Indian (1887-1947); Pakistani (1947-1949)
- Political party: All-India Muslim League; Jamiat Ulema-e-Islam
- Notable work(s): Fath al-Mulhim bi-Sharh Sahih al-Imam Muslim, Tafseer-e-Usmani
- Relatives: Usmani family of Deoband

Religious life
- Religion: Islam
- Denomination: Sunni
- Founder of: Jamiat Ulema-e-Islam
- Jurisprudence: Hanafi
- Movement: Deobandi

Muslim leader
- Teacher: Saeed Ahmad Sandwipi
- Students: Athar Ali Bengali, Azizul Haque, Shah Abdul Wahhab, Badre Alam Merathi, Sharif Hasan Deobandi

Shabbir Ahmad Usmani (Note: شبیر احمد عثمانی) (11 October 1887 – 13 December 1949) was a Pakistani independence activist and Islamic scholar who served as the Shaykh al-Islām of Pakistan in 1949.

He was the first to demand that Pakistan become an Islamic state. He was a religious scholar, writer, orator, politician, and an expert in tafsir and Hadith.

Born in 1887 in Bijnor, Usmani was an alumnus of Darul Uloom Deoband. He was the son of Fazlur Rahman Usmani. His brother Azizur Rahman Usmani was the first Grand Mufti of Darul Uloom Deoband. Usmani was the first to hoist the Flag of Pakistan at Karachi on 14 August 1947, and led the funeral prayers of Muhammad Ali Jinnah. His major work is the Tafseer-e-Usmani, which he co-authored with his teacher Mahmud Hasan Deobandi.

== Early life ==
He was born on 11 October 1887 in Bijnor, a city in North-Western Provinces, British India. His father, Fazlur Rahman Usmani, was a deputy inspector of schools and had been sent on assignment to Bareilly, when his son Shabbir was born. His nephews include Atiqur Rahman Usmani and Shams Naved Usmani.

== Education and career ==
He was educated at Darul Uloom Deoband, where he became a disciple of Mahmud Hasan Deobandi, and graduated in 1908. After his graduation, he was appointed as a teacher at Darul Uloom Deoband.

In 1915, when Mahmud Hasan went into self-exile in Hijaz, Saudi Arabia, Usmani filled his position as the teacher of Sahih al-Muslim, a book of teachings of Muhammad. In 1925, Sultan Abdul Aziz Ibn Saud of Saudi Arabia scheduled a conference for prominent religious scholars from all over the world. A delegation of a number of 'Ulema' from India participated in this conference. It is believed that they chose Usmani as their leader after having a short conversation with him.

In 1926, he moved to Dabhel, a small predominantly Deobandi town in the Indian state of Gujarat, and became a teacher at Jamiah Islamiah Talimuddin Dabhel. In October 1920, when the foundation committee decided to establish Jamia Millia Islamia, he was elected as a member of the founding committee. Many other Islamic scholars also were members of the Foundation Committee including Hussain Ahmad Madani, Abdul Bari Firangi Mahali, Mahmud Hasan Deobandi, Kifayatullah Dihlawi, and Abdul Haq Akorwi. In 1933, when Anwar Shah Kashmiri died, Usmani became the teacher of Sahih al-Bukhari, a book of teachings by Muhammad. His disciples include Badre Alam Merathi.

== Political career ==
Shabbir Ahmad Usmani was one of the founding members of Jamia Millia Islamia, New Delhi as he was a member of the Foundation Committee of the Jamia (University) that met on Friday, 29 October 1920. In 1944, he became a member of the All-India Muslim League and led a small group of Deobandis who supported the creation of Pakistan.

As a leader of this pro-Pakistan faction of Deobandis of the old Jamiat-e-Ulema-e-Hind party, which was originally founded in Deoband in 1919, he went ahead and founded a new and separate political party called the Jamiat Ulema-e-Islam in 1945, along with other like-minded pro-Pakistan religious leaders. He joined Muslim League in 1944 at a critical juncture of Pakistan movement when most of the feudals of N.W.F.P. and Punjab came under the influence of the Congress. Shabbir Ahmad Usmani with a team of 500 Ulema eliminated the influence of these corrupt feudals from these regions and converted the sentiments of common people toward Pakistan movement. The importance of Maulana Usmani is also conspicuous from the fact that the Quaid-i-Azam consulted him on all important matters after independence. He served JUI as its first president until his death in 1949. Usmani, with a team of approximately 500 other religious leaders, actively campaigned to convert the sentiments of common Muslim people in favor of the Pakistan movement. He played a key role in steering people away from some of the leaders in Punjab, British India and N.W.F.P. who were previously supporting All India National Congress in those regions. In fact, he became a close consultant of Jinnah after the independence of Pakistan in 1947. He is also notable for having led the funeral prayer of Muhammad Ali Jinnah, the founder of Pakistan in September 1948.

When Pakistan became independent, its first flag hoisting was also done (in West Pakistan) by him in the presence of Muhammad Ali Jinnah and Liaqat Ali Khan (while in East Pakistan, his fellow, Allama Zafar Ahamd Usmani, did the flag hoisting in the presence of Khwaja Nazimuddin).

After the Partition of India, Usmani became a member of the Constituent Assembly of Pakistan, and remained a member until his death in 1949.

He is best remembered for having spearheaded the Qarardad-i-Maqasid Objectives Resolution for Pakistan, which was passed by the Constituent Assembly of Pakistan on 12 March 1949.

In 1946 Usmani furnished the Quranic basis for the establishment of Pakistan by citing the distinction between momin (believer) and kafir (non-believer).

== Death and legacy ==
Usmani died at Baghdadul Jadid in Bahawalpur State on 13 December 1949, and was buried at Islamia Science College (Karachi) the next day.

Pakistan Postal Services issued a commemorative postage stamp in his honor in 1990 in its 'Pioneers of Freedom' series. His death is seen as the end of an important phase in the movement for the establishment of an Islamic constitution in newly independent Pakistan, as noted by Sayyid A. S. Pirzada, a scholar from Quaid-i-Azam University.

== Books ==
Title	Description
Tafsir-e-Usmani	an Urdu translation of the tafsir of the Quran written by Mahmud ul Hasan
Fath al-Mulhim bi-Sharh Sahih al-Imam Muslim	a commentary on Sahih Muslim
Al-‘Aql wan-Naql	a philosophical study on the relation between faith and reason from an Islamic perspective
I’jaz ul-Qur’an	on the miraculous nature of the Qur’an
Mas’alah-yi taqdir	on predestination in Islam

== Sources ==
- Jackson, William (2013). A Subcontinent's Sunni Schism: The Deobandi-Barelvi Rivalry and the Creation of Modern South Asia (PhD thesis). Syracuse, New York: Syracuse University. pp. 262–291. Archived from the original on 29 October 2022.
- فتح الملہم از مولانا شبیر احمد عثمانیؒ اور منتہ المنعم از مولانا صفی الرحمن مبارکپوریؒ کے مناہج کا تقابلی مطالعہ
- Allama Sahabbir Ahmed Uthmani's Efforts for Islamization in Pakistan
- Hassan, Hafiz Muhammad
- Ghouri, Syed Abdul Majid (2011). "Al-muhaddith Shabbeer Ahmed Al-Usmani & His Contribution In The Field Of Hadis". Hadis Jurnal Ilmiah Berwasit (in Arabic): 97–123. ISSN 2550-1585. Archived from the original on 13 October 2022.
- ارشد, علی (2000). علامہ شبیر احمد عثمانیؑ کا تحریک آزادی مین کردار (Thesis thesis) (in Urdu). University of Sindh, Jamshoro.
- Rizwan Hussain. Pakistan and the emergence of Islamic militancy in Afghanistan. Ashgate Publishing, Ltd., 2005

ISBN 0-7546-4434-0, ISBN 978-0-7546-4434-7
