= Deoband =

Town in Uttar Pradesh, India

- Town
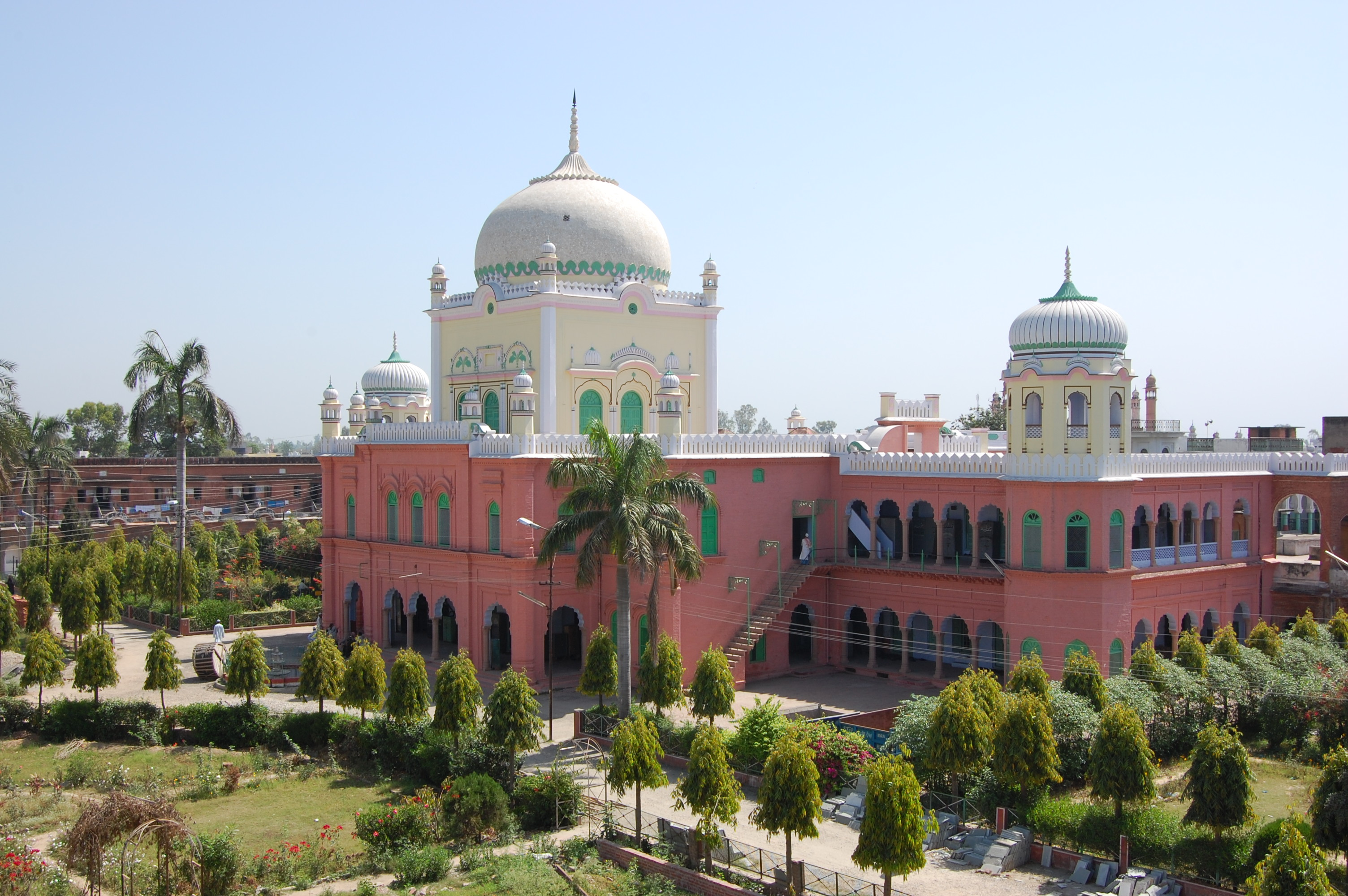
- Darul Uloom Deoband

- Location within Uttar Pradesh Location within India
- Coordinates: 29.692°N 77.677°E
- Country: India
- State: Uttar Pradesh
- District: Saharanpur

Government
  - Body: Nagar Palika parishad Deoband
- Elevation: 256 m (840 ft)

Population (2011)
  - Total: 97,037
- Demonym: Deobandi

Language
  - Official: Hindi
  - Additional official: Urdu
- Time zone: UTC+5:30 (IST)
- Postal code: 247554
- Area code: 01336
- Vehicle registration: UP-11

Deoband is a town and a municipality in Saharanpur district in the state of Uttar Pradesh, India, about 150 km (93 miles) from Delhi. Darul Uloom Deoband, an Islamic seminary and one of the largest Islamic institutions of India is located there.

== Etymology ==
The native Hindi name for the place is "Devband". According to one theory, it derives from "devi" (goddess) and "van" (forest), when this place was full of forests in the Mahabharata-era. A related argument is that it is derived from "devi" and "vandan" (praise), referring to the local Durga temples. Another states that the word has persian origins, with 'band' meaning enclosure and 'dev' meaning a spirit.

== History ==
The 16th century Bhakti saint Shri Hith Harivansh Mahaprabhu and the founder of the Radhavallabh Sampradaya of Vaishnavism based in Vrindavan, lived in Deoband before his renunciation. He also established a temple here, dedicated to Radha-Krishna and named it "Radha-Navrangilal".

Deoband is listed in the Ain-i-Akbari as a pargana under Saharanpur sarkar, producing a revenue of 6,477,977 dams for the imperial treasury and supplying a force of 300 infantry and 60 cavalry. It had a brick fort at the time.

The Darul Uloom Deoband learning centre was established on 21 May 1866 by Fazlur Rahman Usmani, Sayyid Muhammad Abid, Muhammad Qasim Nanotawi, Mehtab Ali, Nehal Ahmad and Zulfiqar Ali Deobandi. The Deobandi Islamic movement originated in the Darul Uloom.

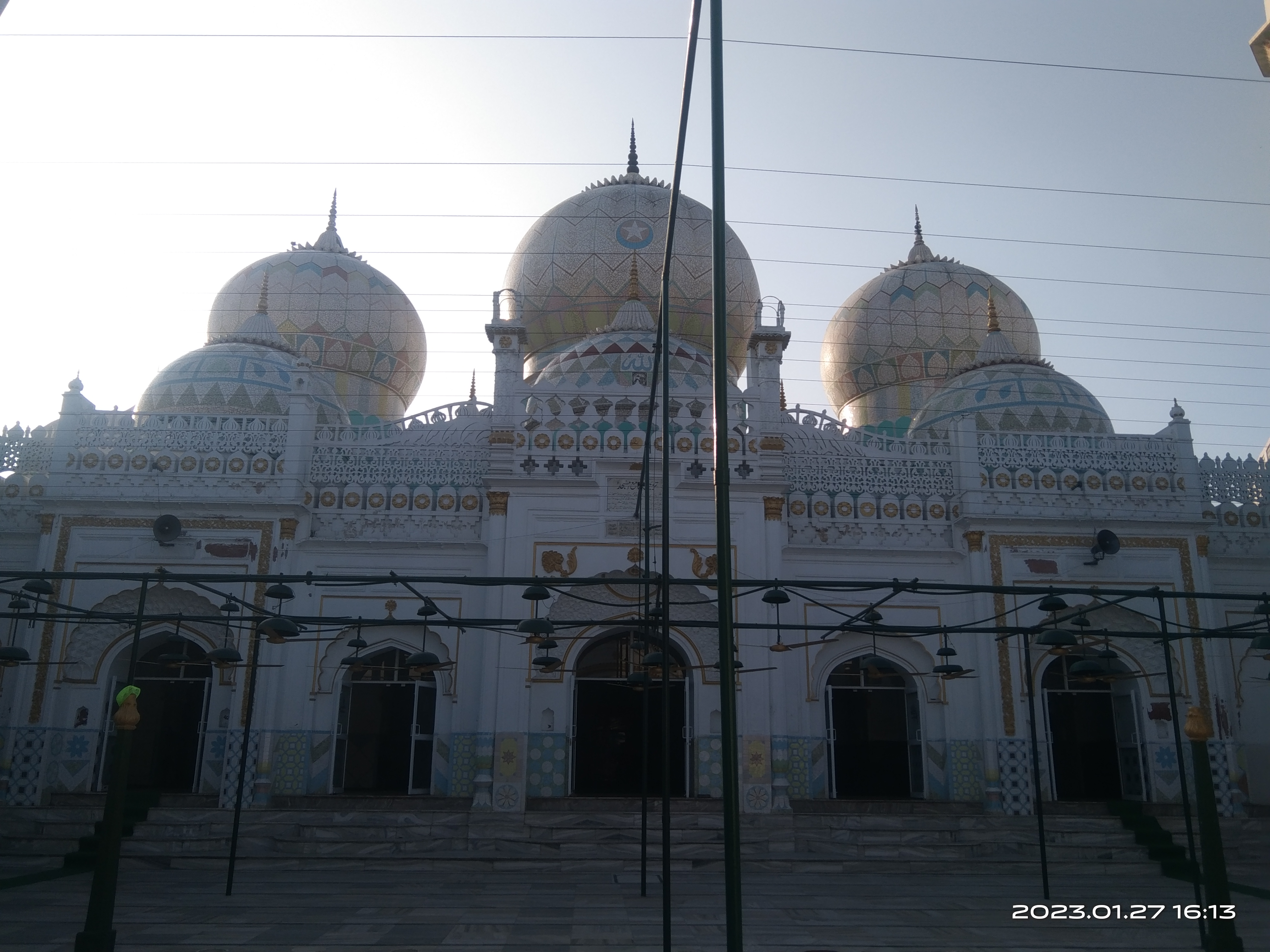
Central Jama Masjid Deoband

== Geography ==
Deoband is located at 29.7°N 77.68°E. It has an average elevation of 256 metres (840 ft).

== Demographics ==
Deoband has a population of 97,037 of which 53,538 are males while 43,499 are females as per the report released by Census India 2011. The population of children aged 06 is 12,200 which is 12.57% of the total population. The sex ratio is 812 females per 1000 males against the state average of 912. The child sex ratio in Deoband is around 917 compared to the Uttar Pradesh state average of 902. The effective literacy rate (for population seven years and above) is 75.23%, higher than the state average of 67.68% with male literacy of 79.59% and the female literacy rate is 69.77%. Out of the total population, 24,559 were engaged in work or business activity. Of this, 22,551 were males while 2,008 were females and 89.91% were engaged in main work. The Scheduled Caste population was 3,576. Deoband had a total of 16,530 households in 2011. Deoband Nagar Palika Parishad has a total administration over 15,630 houses to which it supplies basic amenities like water and sewage. It is also authorised to build roads within Nagar Palika Parishad limits and impose taxes on properties coming under its jurisdiction.

Religions in Deoband tehsil (2011)
Religion	Percent
Hinduism	59.80%
Islam	39.77%
Other or not stated	0.43%

Religions in Deoband town(2011)
Religion	Percent
Islam	71.06%
Hinduism	27.87%
Other or not stated	1.07%

== See also ==
- Radha Vallabha Sampradaya
- Hit Harivansh Mahaprabhu
- Darul Uloom Deoband
- Deobandi
- Islam in India
- Tabligh
- Usmani family of Deoband
