= Darul Uloom Deoband =

Islamic seminary in Uttar Pradesh, India

- Dār Al‘Ulūm Dēōband

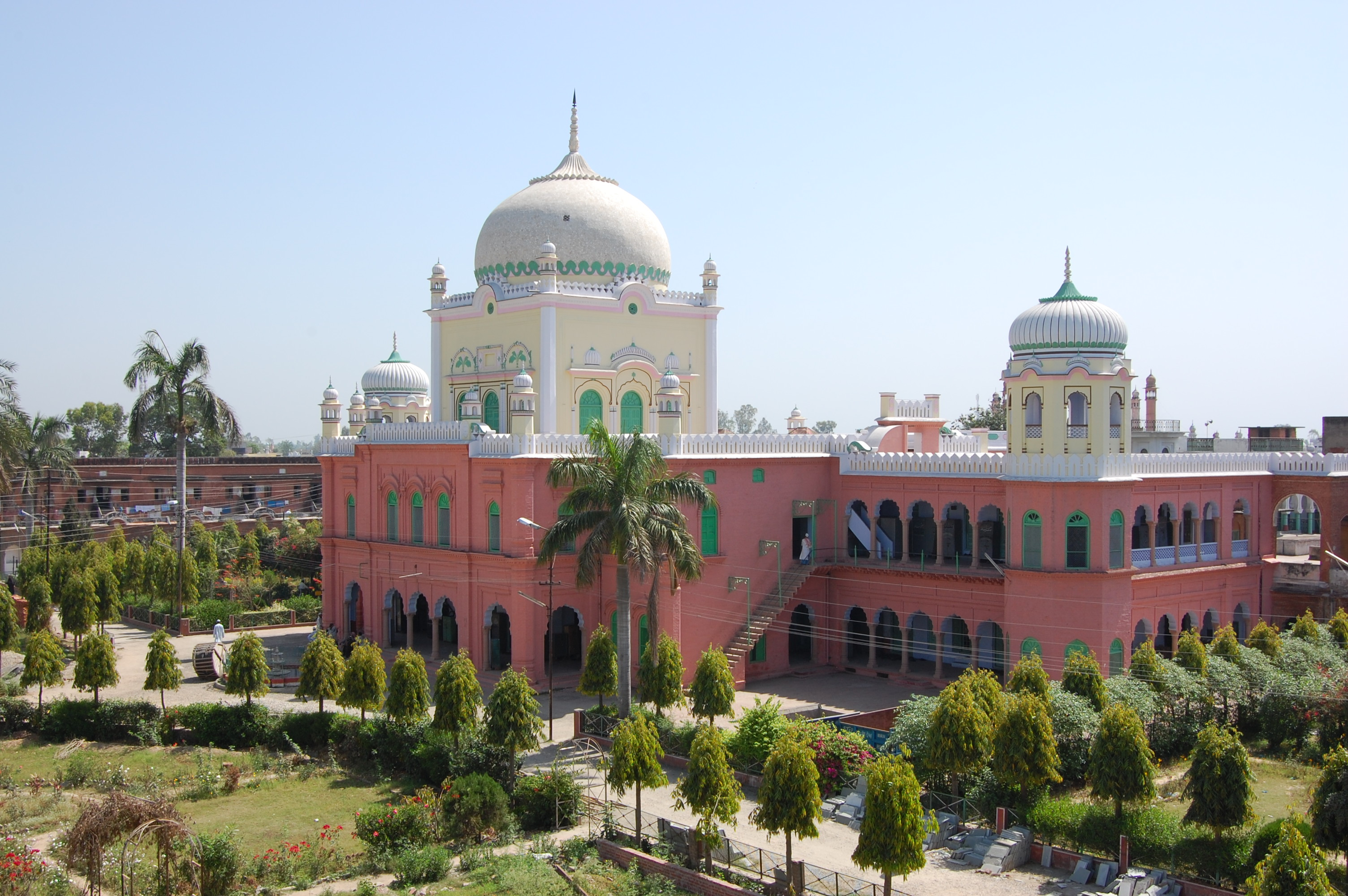
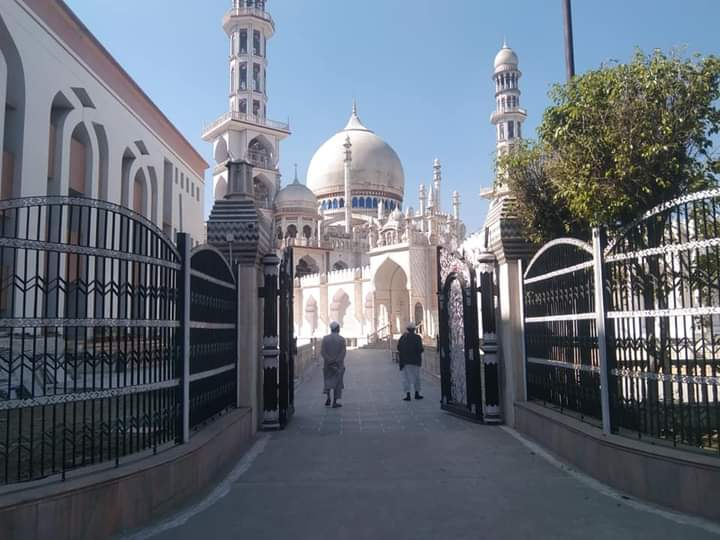
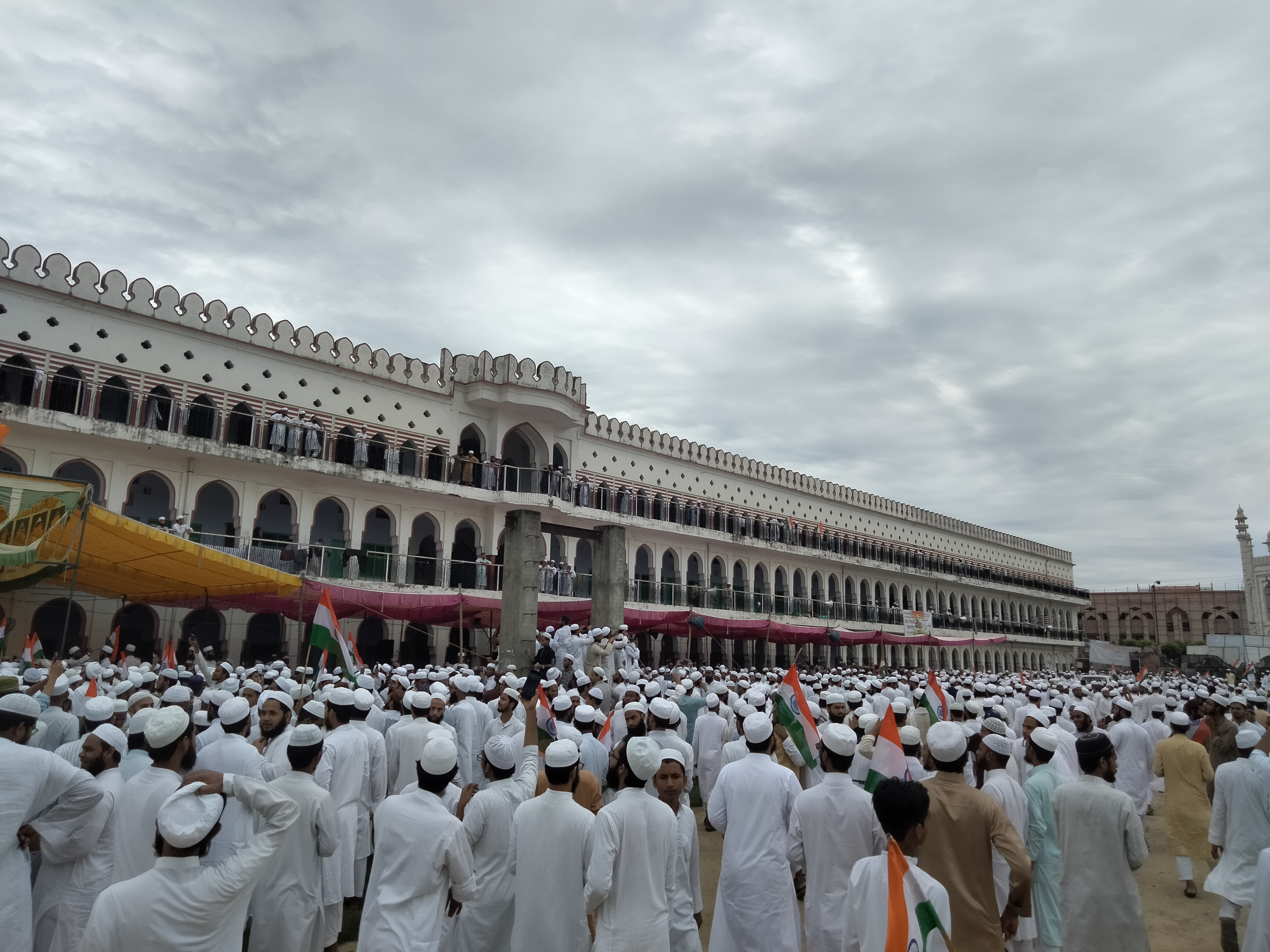
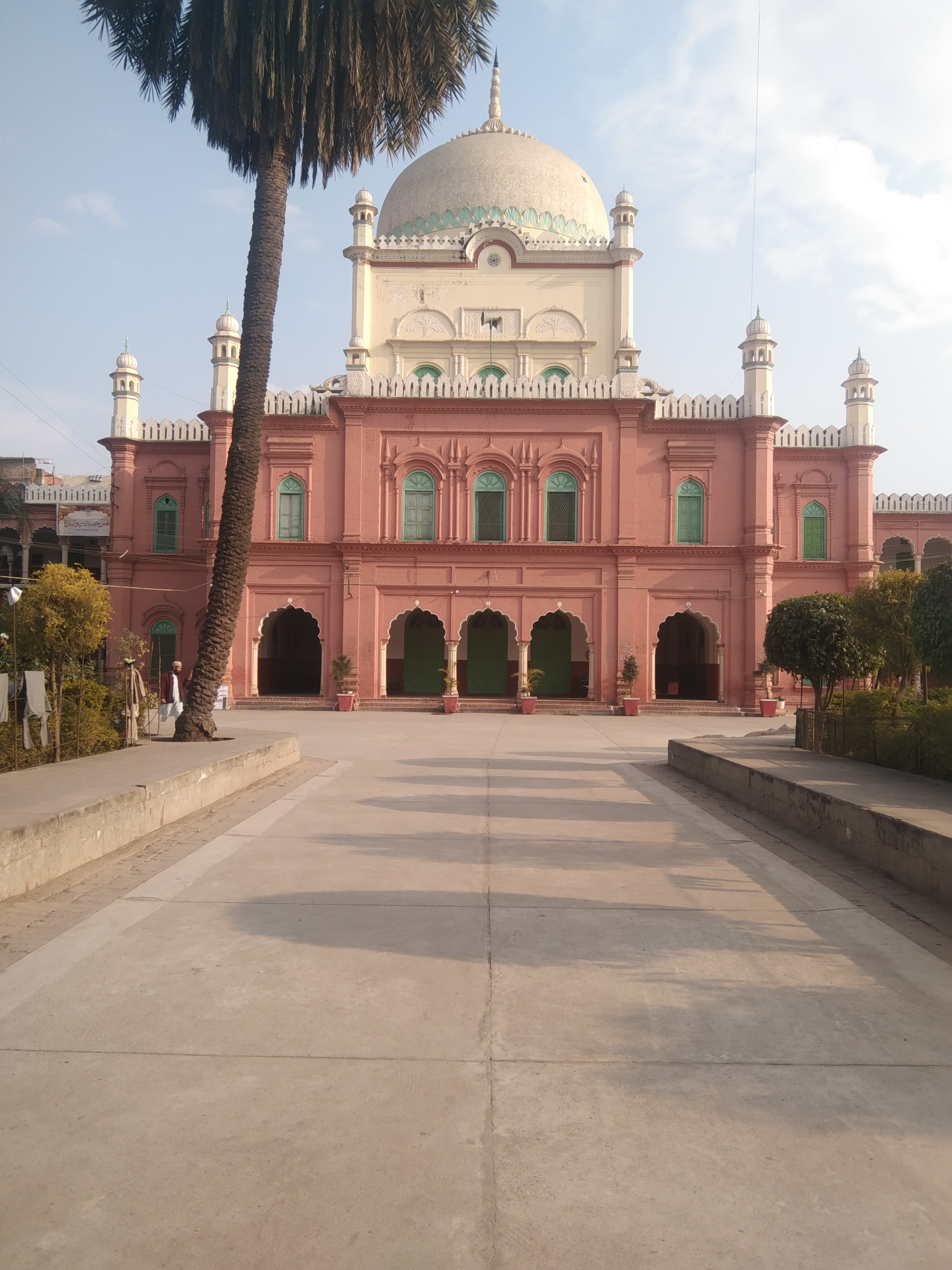
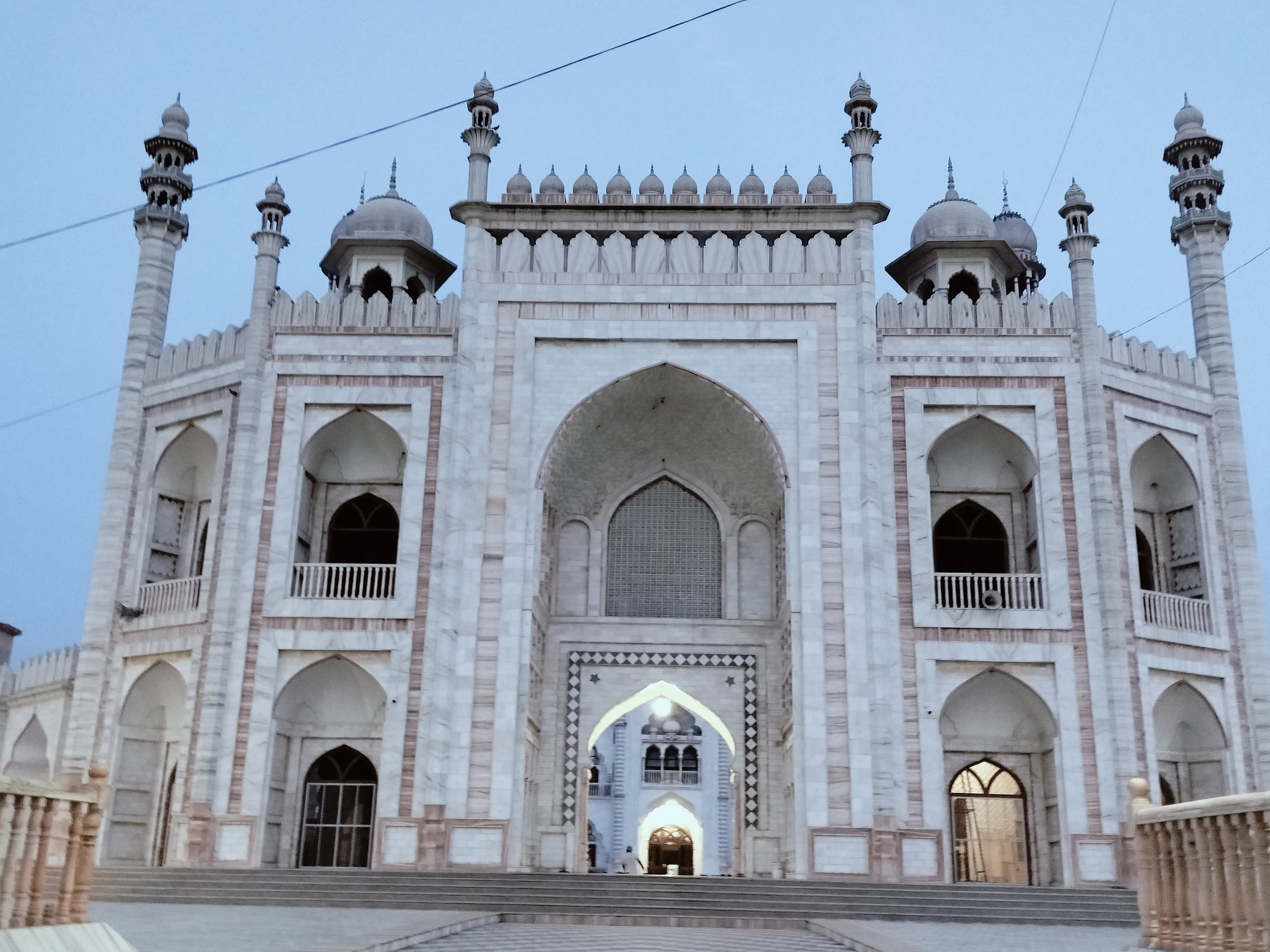

Location
- Deoband, Uttar Pradesh, 247554; India; 29°41′51″N 77°40′34″E

Information
- Type: Islamic seminary
- Motto: Al-Jāmiʿah al-Islāmiyyah (The university of the Islam)
- Religious affiliation: Sunni Islam
- Denomination: Deobandi
- Established: 31 May 1866; 160 years ago
- Founders: Sayyid Muhammad Abid; Fazlur Rahman Usmani; Mahtab Ali Deobandi; Nihal Ahmad Deobandi; Zulfiqar Ali Deobandi; Rashid Ahmad Gangohi; Muhammad Qasim Nanautawi (variously described in later historiography as the seminary’s bānī-yi aʿẓam or principal founder)
- School district: Saharanpur district
- Rector: Abul Qasim Nomani
- Principal: Arshad Madani
- Campus type: Urban
- Colors: Black and white
- Website: darululoom-deoband.com

Darul Uloom Deoband is an Islamic seminary in Deoband, Uttar Pradesh, India, established on 15 Muharram 1283 AH / 31 May 1866, in the aftermath of the 1857 revolt, through the efforts of Sayyid Muhammad Abid and other local scholars and notables. Muhammad Qasim Nanautawi is later described in historiography as the seminary’s intellectual guide and principal founder (bānī-yi aʿẓam). The institution, which began under a pomegranate tree with the Dars-i Nizami curriculum, later developed into a leading center of Islamic learning in South Asia, after Al-Azhar University. It came to be regarded as a vanguard of Sunni Muslim identity in the Indian subcontinent and gave rise to the Sunni Deobandi movement. The seminary has been described not merely as a madrasa but as a 'center of Islamic culture' and a 'patrimony for the Islamic world.' Darul Uloom was initially functioning in a mosque, and later it was shifted with the passage of time to rented houses and also to Jami Mosque. Darul Uloom had its first independent building in 1879, after which it gradually added several buildings and halls for various faculties and departments. Darul Uloom was initially functioning in a mosque and later shifted to rented houses; it also worked in Jamia Mosque.

== History ==
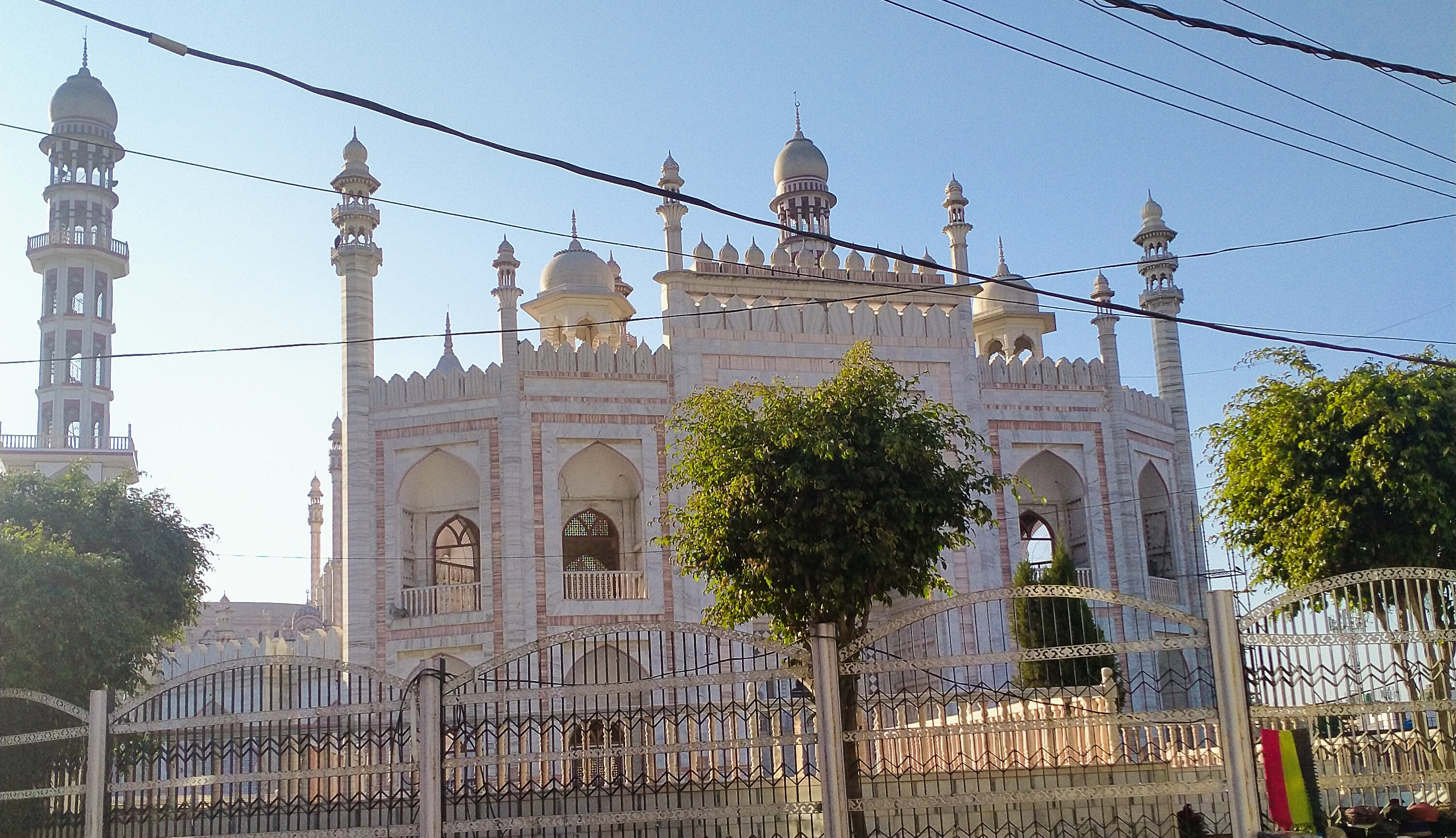
Masjid-e-Rasheed in the seminary compound

Darul Uloom Deoband was established on 15 Muharram 1283 AH, Thursday (31 May 1866), when local scholars and notables including Sayyid Muhammad Abid, Fazlur Rahman Usmani, Mahtab Ali Deobandi, Nihal Ahmad Deobandi, Zulfiqar Ali Deobandi, and Rafiuddin Deobandi gathered funds to open an Arabic madrasa in the Chhatta Masjid, Deoband. Mahmud Deobandi was appointed the first teacher, and Mahmud Hasan Deobandi was the first student who enrolled in the seminary.

In 1292 AH / 1875 CE, the foundation of the present campus was laid, with Muhammad Qasim Nanautawi persuading Sayyid Abid Husain to join in the ceremony and place the second brick.

In 1982, during the Vice Chancellorship of Muhammad Tayyib Qasmi, administrative disputes occurred in the seminary which led to the formation of Darul Uloom Waqf.

The spread of the Deobandi movement in the United Kingdom has produced some criticism concerning their views on interfaith dialogue and values including democracy, secularism, and the rule of law. In September 2007 Andrew Norfolk of The Times published an article titled "Hardline takeover of British mosques" about the influence of the Deobandis whom the author called a "hardline Islamic sect".

In February 2008, an anti-terrorism conference organised by the seminary denounced all forms of terrorism.

On 11 October 2025, as part of his first trip to India, Afghan Foreign Minister Amir Khan Muttaqi visited Darul Uloom Deoband, the site of the Deobandi movement, which has a significant influence on Afghanistan's ruling Taliban.

== Program ==
The school teaches manqulat (revealed Islamic sciences) according to the Hanafi school of Islamic jurisprudence. In this seminar, Nanawtawi instituted modern methods of learning such as teaching in classrooms, a fixed and carefully selected curriculum, lectures by academics who were leaders in their fields, exam periods, merit prizes, and a publishing press. Students were taught in Urdu, and sometimes in Arabic for theological reasons or Persian, for cultural and literary reasons. The curriculum is based on a highly modified version of the 18th century Indo-Islamic syllabus known as Dars-e-Nizami. The students learn the Quran and its exegesis; Hadith and its commentary; and juristic rulings with textual and rational proofs. They also study the biography of Muhammad, Arabic grammar, Arabic language and literature, and Persian language.

Almost a quarter of the students who complete the Daurae Hadith continue their studies. These advanced courses include Takmil Ifta (Jurisprudence); Takmil Adab (Arabic literature); and Takhassus fil Hadith (Hadith). Students who complete the Takmil Ifta take the title Mufti.

== Role in the Indian independence movement ==
The political ideals of Darul Uloom Deoband were founded up to ten years prior to its opening. In 1857, Imdadullah Muhajir Makki (a spiritual leader) and his followers, Muhammad Qasim Nanautawi, Rasheed Ahmad Gangohi, Muhammad Yaqub Nanautawi and others gathered at Thana Bhawan to protest against British rule and continue their call for the independence of India. They fought what is called the Battle of Shamli.

In 1926 and 1927, graduates of the school called for Indian independence at Jamiat Ulama meetings in Calcutta and Peshawar. Madani opposed the suggestion of the All-India Muslim League for the partition of India along sectarian lines. He also advocated democratic government with religious freedoms and tolerance.

On 29 December 1929, Majlis-e-Ahrar-ul-Islam (Majlis-e-Ah'rar-e-Islam, Urdu: مجلس احرارلأسلام, or Ahrar), a conservative Sunni Muslim Deobandi political party was founded in Lahore, Punjab. The founding members of the party were Chaudhry Afzal Haq, Syed Ata Ullah Shah Bukhari, Habib-ur-Rehman Ludhianvi, Mazhar Ali Azhar, Zafar Ali Khan and Dawood Ghaznavi. The founding members were disillusioned by the Khilafat Movement, which had aligned with the Indian National Congress. The party gathered support from the urban lower-middle class. It opposed Muhammad Ali Jinnah, leader of the All-India Muslim League and in the early years of Pakistan wanted Ahmadiyas to be declared non-Muslims.

== Fatwas ==
A fatwa is “an issue arising about law and religion, explained in answer to questions received about it” by muftis (Islamic jurists). Muftis at Darul Ifta (fatwa department), Darul Uloom Deoband are responsible for giving fatwas.

On 31 May 2008, the seminary issued a significant public “Fatwa against terrorism” after a public rally in Delhi with around 100,000 representatives from nearly 6,000 madrasas across India, including those from different sects. The fatwa was a first of its kind in South Asia and stated that "in Islam, creating social discord or disorder, breach of peace, rioting, bloodsan, pillage or plunder and killing of innocent persons anywhere in the world are all considered most inhuman crimes.” The edict was signed by Habibur Rahman Khairabadi.

=== Controversial fatwas ===
In January 2012, scholars from a Deobandi school issued a religious decision calling for the author Salman Rushdie to be barred from entering India to attend a literature festival because, in their opinion, he had offended Muslim sentiments.

In May 2010, clerics from a Deobandi school issued a fatwa stating that men and women cannot work together in public offices unless the women are properly clothed.

In September 2013, scholars from a Deobandi school issued a fatwa banning photography as un-Islamic unless it is for an identity card or for making a passport.

In February 2024, National Commission for Protection of Child Rights, demanded an FIR against the seminary's alleged promotion of the idea of Ghazwa-e-Hind, claiming that a supporting fatwa was available on their website, in response to a question seeking an answer to "whether Hadith talks about invasion of India or the Ghazwa-e-Hind".

== Entry of women in campus ==
Darul Uloom Deoband has garnered attention for its stances on women's rights, including issuing fatwas that restrict certain activities for Muslim women, including watching men's football, and plucking their eyebrows without their husband's permission. Additionally, the seminary faced criticism for its silence on the Taliban's ban on women's education, as the Taliban also aligns with the Deobandi ideology.

In May 2024, Darul Uloom Deoband imposed a ban on the entry of women and girls to its premises, citing concerns over social media videos filmed on the campus. The seminary's rector Abul Qasim Nomani, stated that this decision responded to public complaints about the circulation of these videos, which were considered distracting and offensive by supporters of the institution. Prior to this, women were already restricted from entering the Rashidia mosque on campus; this restriction was now expanded to the entire seminary.

In November 2024, the seminary lifted the ban on women's entry with conditions. Women were allowed on campus only if accompanied by a male guardian, wearing purdah, and prohibited from taking photographs. Reports suggested that the original ban negatively impacted nearby businesses, which led to the policy's revision.

== Administration ==
Darul Uloom, Deoband 1980 Indian postage stamp

The seminary's co-founder Sayyid Muhammad Abid was the first vice-chancellor. Abul Qasim Nomani succeeded Ghulam Mohammad Vastanvi as the thirteenth VC of the seminary on 24 July 2011.

Ordinal	Name (birth–death)	Term start	Term end	Time in office	Reference
1	Sayyid Muhammad Abid (1834–1912)	1866	1867	0–1 years	
2	Rafiuddin Deobandi (1836–1891)	1867	1868	1–2 years	
3	Sayyid Muhammad Abid (1834–1912)	1869	1871	1–2 years	
4	Rafiuddin Deobandi (1836–1891)	1872	1889	16–17 years	
5	Sayyid Muhammad Abid (1834–1912)	1890	1892	1–2 years	
6	Fazl-e-Haque Deobandi	1893	1894	0–1 years	
7	Muhammad Munir Nanautavi (1831-1904)	1894	1895	0–1 years	
8	Hafiz Muhammad Ahmad (1862–1928)	1895	1928	32–33 years	
9	Habibur Rahman Usmani (1860 -1929)	1928	1929	0–1 years	
10	Muhammad Tayyib Qasmi (1897–1983)	1929	9 August 1982	52–53 years	
11	Marghubur Rahman Bijnori (1914–2010)	1982	2010	27–28 years	
12	Ghulam Muhammad Vastanvi (1950 - 2025)	11 January 2011	23 July 2011	193 days	
13	Abul Qasim Nomani Banarsi (b. 1947)	July 24, 2011	incumbent	15 years, 89 days	

== Academic leadership ==
The following tables provide an overview of prominent academic figures who have held senior positions at Darul Uloom Deoband, including principals (Arabic: صدور المدرسين) and senior hadith instructors (Arabic: شيوخ الحديث).

Principals of Darul Uloom Deoband
No.	Name	Term
1	Yaqub Nanautawi	1866–1883
2	Syed Ahmad Dehlavi	1884–1890
3	Mahmud Hasan Deobandi	1890–1915
4	Anwar Shah Kashmiri	1915–1927
5	Hussain Ahmad Madani	1927–1957
6	Muhammad Ibrahim Balyawi	1957–1967
7	Syed Fakhruddin Ahmad	1967–1972
8	Fakhrul Hasan Moradabadi	1972–1980
9	Mirajul Haq Deobandi	1981–1991
9	Naseer Ahmad Khan	1991–2008
10	Saeed Ahmad Palanpuri	2008–2020
11	Arshad Madani	2020–present

Senior Hadith Teachers (Shuyukh al-Hadith) of Darul Uloom Deoband
No.	Name	Term
1	Yaqub Nanautawi	1866–1883
2	Syed Ahmad Dehlavi	1884–1890
3	Mahmud Hasan Deobandi	1890–1915
4	Anwar Shah Kashmiri	1915–1927
5	Hussain Ahmad Madani	1927–1957
6	Syed Fakhruddin Ahmad	1957–1972
7	Sharif Hasan Deobandi	1972–1977
8	Naseer Ahmad Khan	1977–2008
9	Saeed Ahmad Palanpuri	2008–2020
10	Abul Qasim Nomani	2020–present

== Notable alumni ==
Alumni include:

- Mahmud Hasan Deobandi, leader of Silk Letter Movement
- Anwar Shah Kashmiri, hadith scholar
- Ashraf Ali Thanwi, Sufi Shaykh and author of Bahishti Zewar and Bayan al-Quran.
- Minnatullah Rahmani, First General Secretary of the All India Muslim Personal Law Board.
- Muhammad Shafi, first Grand Mufti of Pakistan
- Muhammad Ilyas Kandhlawi, founder of Tablighi Jamat
- Hussain Ahmad Madani, author of Composite Nationalism and Islam
- Taha Karaan, former head-mufti of Muslim Judicial Council.

== Publications ==
Darul ‘Uloom Deoband and its alumni publish:

- Al-Daie, Arabic monthly periodical.
- Monthly Darul Uloom, Urdu monthly periodical.
- Aaeenah Darul ‘Uloom, Urdu fortnightly periodical.
- Darulifta-Deoband.com

== See also ==
- List of Deobandi madrasas
- List of Deobandi organisations
- Bibliography of Darul Uloom Deoband
