= Zulfiqar Ali Deobandi =

19th–20th century Indian Islamic scholar and writer

- ذوالفقار علی دیوبندی
- Born: 1822; Deoband, Ceded and Conquered Provinces, Company Raj
- Died: 1904 (aged 81–82); Deoband, United Provinces of Agra and Oudh, British India
- Resting place: Qasmi Cemetery
- Education: Delhi College
- Occupations: Islamic scholar, educator, writer
- Known for: Early association with Darul Uloom Deoband; member of its first Shura council
- Notable work: Tashīl al-Dirāsah, Tashīl al-Bayān, al-Taʿlīqāt ʿalā al-Sabʿ al-Muʿallaqāt, al-Irshād, ʿIṭr al-Wardah, Miʿyār al-Balāghah/Tadhkirat al-Balāghah, Tashīl al-Ḥisāb
- Children: Mahmud Hasan Deobandi (among others)
- Relatives: Usmani family of Deoband

Zulfiqar Ali Deobandi (1822–1904) was an Indian Islamic scholar, educator and writer. He was among the early founders of Darul Uloom Deoband and served for decades as a member of its first consultative council (shūra). He taught at Bareilly College, worked as an inspector in the colonial education department, and later served as an honorary magistrate in Deoband. He authored Urdu commentaries on several Arabic literary classics, as well as works on rhetoric and mathematics. He was the father of Mahmud Hasan Deobandi.

== Early life and education ==
Accounts in local histories record that Zulfiqar Ali Deobandi was born in Deoband in 1822 (1237 AH), the son of Sheikh Fath Ali, and the younger brother of Mahtab Ali Deobandi.

He studied at Delhi College under Mamluk Ali Nanautawi and Sadruddin Khan Azurda Dehlawi and is listed among the prominent pupils of Mamluk Ali.

== Career ==
After completing his studies, Zulfiqar Ali was appointed a professor at Bareilly College; he subsequently served as Deputy Inspector and then Inspector of primary schools in the education department. After receiving a pension, he worked as an honorary magistrate in Deoband. Local histories identify him among the early founders of Darul Uloom Deoband and state that he sat on its first majlis-e-shura (consultative council). Muhammad Tayyib Qasmi records his tenure on the first shura from 1283 to 1321 AH (1866–1903 CE).

=== Role in Darul Uloom Deoband ===
Local histories describe Zulfiqar Ali as an early supporter and adviser in the establishment and early operations of Darul Uloom Deoband, alongside Sayyid Muhammad Abid. Several accounts directly describe him as a co-founder of the seminary. He is also recorded as a member of the first shura for several decades (1283–1321 AH / 1866–1903 CE).

== Writings ==
Zulfiqar Ali wrote in Urdu on Arabic literature and rhetoric, and authored a mathematics primer. Titles reported in the sources include:

- Tashīl al-Dirāsah — Urdu commentary on Dīwān al-Ḥamāsa.
- Tashīl al-Bayān — Urdu commentary on Dīwān al-Mutanabbī.
- al-Taʿlīqāt ʿalā al-Sabʿ al-Muʿallaqāt — Urdu commentary on the Sabʿ al-Muʿallaqāt.
- al-Irshād — Urdu commentary on Qaṣīdat Bānat Suʿād.
- ʿIṭr al-Wardah — Urdu commentary on Qaṣīdat al-Burdah.
- Miʿyār al-Balāghah (also referred to as Tadhkirat al-Balāghah) — a handbook of rhetoric presented in Urdu with examples from Urdu poetry.
- Tashīl al-Ḥisāb — a mathematics work; Garcin de Tassy (as quoted by Rizwi) notes an Urdu edition printed at Bareilly in 1852.

In 1307 AH he wrote an Arabic treatise, al-Hadiyya al-Saniyya fī Dhikr al-Madrasah al-Islāmiyya al-Diyūbandiyya, describing Darul Uloom Deoband, its elders, and features of Deoband in a brief, literary style.

== Reception ==
Fuyūz ar-Rahman's compilation cites Abdul Hayy Hasani's remarks that Zulfiqar Ali studied under Mamluk Ali and Sadr al-Din Dehlavi, excelled in literary sciences, and served as an inspector of primary schools; his listed writings include Urdu commentaries on Dīwān al-Ḥamāsa, Dīwān al-Mutanabbī, and the Sabʿ al-Muʿallaqāt, as well as a work on rhetoric.

=== Garcin de Tassy reference ===
Syed Mehboob Rizwi, citing Mohammad Ayyub Qadiri, reported that the French Orientalist Garcin de Tassy mentioned Zulfiqar Ali. However, in de Tassy's original French text the person named is Ashraf ‘Alī (a professor at Delhi College); Zulfiqar Ali is not mentioned.

== Family ==
Published accounts identify him as the father of Mahmud Hasan Deobandi (1268–1339 AH). Other sons mentioned in local histories include Hamid Hasan, Muhammad Hasan, and Muhammad Mohsin; two daughters are also noted. Some compendia state that he left a large family at the time of his death.

== Death ==
Multiple sources record that Zulfiqar Ali died in Deoband in 1322 AH/1904 CE at the age of 85. He is buried to the east of Muhammad Qasim Nanautavi's grave in the Qasmi cemetery; Muhammad Ahsan Nanautavi is reported to be buried to his left.
