= Scouting and Guiding in Pakistan =

The Scout and Guide movement in Pakistan is served by the Pakistan Girl Guides Association and the Pakistan Boy Scouts Association. From September 2007, Scouting was to become compulsory in schools. The aim is to have one million youth volunteers to help out in emergencies. Two per cent of exam fees collected by the examination boards will be paid to the various Scouting and Guiding organisations.

== See also ==
- Pakistan Boy Scouts Association
- Pakistan Girl Guides Association
- Balochistan Boy Scouts Association
