= List of students of Mahmud Hasan Deobandi =

Students of Indian Muslim scholar and activist

Mahmud Hasan Deobandi, popularly known as Shaykh al-Hind, was the first student of Darul Uloom Deoband, and one of three major students of its founder Muhammad Qasim Nanautavi. He presided the foundation ceremony of Jamia Millia Islamia at Aligarh in 1920. He wrote a translation of Quran in Urdu language which has been regarded as one of the most authentic South Asian translation of Quran.

Ebrahim Moosa, while commenting on the students of Mahmud Hasan Deobandi, says:

His fine cohort of students later gained popularity in the madrasa network and made contribution in the public life in South Asia in fields as diverse as religious scholarship, politics, and institution-building.

== List of students ==
The following is a list of the students of Mahmud Hasan Deobandi.

Name	Notability	Reference
Ahmed Ali Lahori	He was an exegete of the Qur'an.	
Anwar Shah Kashmiri	He served as the principal of Darul Uloom Deoband for twelve years. Muhammad Iqbal lauded him saying that Allama Kashmiri is undoubtedly the greatest Islamic scholar born in the last 500 years.	
Sayyid Asghar Hussain Deobandi	Best known as the Muhaddith of Darul Uloom Deoband, he laid foundation stone of Madrasatul Islah in Azamgarh. In Darul Uloom Deoband, he taught Sunan Abu Dawud and tafsir besides books on the fiqh such as Jalalayn and Durr-e-Mukhtar.	
Ashraf Ali Thanwi	Best known as Hakim al-Ummah, the known Sufi of recent past, authored more than a thousand books, best known for his translation of the Quran and Bahishti Zewar, an authoritative book on every day Hanafi fiqh.	
Aziz-ul-Rahman Usmani	First Grand Mufti of Darul Uloom Deoband, best known for Fatawa -e- Darul Uloom Deoband (Compilation of Fatwas issued by the seminary).	
Syed Fakhruddin Ahmad	Former Principal of Madrasa Shahi, Moradabad, former President of Jamiat Ulama-e-Hind and former Shaykh al-Hadith of Darul Uloom Deoband.	
Habibullah Qurayshi	He was the founding secretary-general of Al-Jamiatul Ahlia Darul Ulum Moinul Islam in Hathazari (present-day Bangladesh)	
Hafiz Muhammad Ahmad	He was 5th Vice Chancellor of Darul Uloom Deoband and a Grand Mufti of formerly Hyderabad State.	
Hussain Ahmad Madani	Former Principal of Darul Uloom Deoband, Best known as Shaykh al-Islam or Asir-e-Malta. His work Composite Nationalism and Islam is one of the authoritative works on Opposition to the partition of India.	
Ibrahim Balyawi	The 6th Principal of Darul Uloom Deoband. He spent almost 50 years instructing Hadith, Mantiq, Islamic philosophy, and other subjects at Darul Uloom Deoband.	
Izaz Ali Amrohi	Best known as Shaykh al-Adab, his book Nafahtul Arab is taught in the curriculum of dars-e-nizami in various madrasas. He served the post of Chief Mufti of Darul Uloom Deoband for two times.	
Kifayatullah Dehlawi	Best known as Hadhrat Mufti-e-Azam or former Grand Mufti of India, his book Kifayat al-Mufti is an authority in Hanafi Fiqh. He co-founded Jamiat Ulama-e-Hind and acted as its first President. His book Talim al-Islam is taught in various madrasahs.	
Manazir Ahsan Gilani	Best known as Sultan al-Qalam, former Dean of the Faculty of Theology of Osmania University, he is known for his books like Tadwin-e-Hadith, Muqaddama Tadwin-e-Fiqh and Sawanih Qasmi. He also wrote the tafseer of Surah Al-Kahf.	
Muhammad Ilyas Kandhlawi	He founded the Tablighi Jamaat.	
Muhammad Mian Mansoor Ansari	Best known for his role in Silk Letter Movement, he was the grandson of Muhammad Qasim Nanautavi. He authored a few books on politics which include Hukumat-e-Ilahi, Asas-Inqelab and Dastoor-e-Imamat.	
Muhammad Sahool Bhagalpuri	He was a former Grand Mufti of Darul Uloom Deoband.	
Qari Muhammad Tayyib	Best known as Hakim al-Islam, he was Vice Chancellor of Darul Uloom Deoband for more than 50 years. Many of his Khutbas were compiled in multiple volume collection.	
Sanaullah Amritsari	A leading figure of the Ahl-i Hadith movement, he was known for his polemics with Mirza Ghulam Ahmad.	
Shabbir Ahmad Usmani	Best known as Shaykh al-Islam, among founding members of Jamia Millia Islamia, he read the inaugural speech of Mahmud Hasan Deobandi in Aligarh in October 1920. He was strong proponent of Pakistan movement and after the Partition of India, he became a member of the Constituent Assembly of Pakistan, and remained a member until his death in 1949. He served as the Principal of Jamia Islamia Talimuddin, Dabhel after the death of Anwar Shah Kashmiri and later as the chancellor of Darul Uloom Deoband from 1945 to 1944.	
Muhammad Shafi	Former Grand Mufti of Pakistan and founder of Jamia Darul Uloom, Karachi.	
Ubaidullah Sindhi	Best known as Imam-e-Inqelab, he took an active part in Silk Letter Movement. He is known to have established Bait al-Hikmah center in Jamia Millia Islamia in 1940 for the propagation of his Waliullahi philosophy.	
Uzair Gul Peshawari	He was an Indian freedom struggle activist who was jailed along with Mahmud Hasan Deobandi in Malta. He played an active role in Silk Letter Movement.	
Saeed Ahmad Sandwipi		

== Bibliography ==
- Rizwi, Syed Mehboob. Tarikh Darul Uloom Deoband [History of the Dar al-Ulum Deoband]. Vol. 2. Translated by Murtaz Husain F Quraishi (1981 ed.). Deoband: Darul Uloom Deoband.
