= Ghulam Rasool Hazarvi =

British Indian Islamic scholar (d. 1918)

Mawlāna Ghulam Rasool Hazarvi

Personal life
- Born: 1854 Baffa, Hazara, Company Raj (now Mansehra District, Khyber Pakhtunkhwa, Pakistan)
- Died: 24 October 1918 (aged 63–64) Deoband, Saharanpur district, British India
- Resting place: Qasmi cemetery
- Main interest(s): Hadith, Tafsir, Mantiq, Islamic philosophy
- Education: Darul Uloom Deoband

Religious life
- Religion: Islam

Senior posting
- Teacher: Syed Ahmad Dehlavi; Mahmud Hasan Deobandi
- Students: Abdur Rahim Popalzai; Anwar Shah Kashmiri; Asghar Hussain Deobandi; Hussain Ahmad Madani; Izaz Ali Amrohi; Kifayatullah Dehlawi; Manazir Ahsan Gilani; Muhammad Sahool Bhagalpuri; Muhammad Tayyib Qasmi; Shabbir Ahmad Usmani

Ghulām Rasool Hazārvi (1854–1918; also known as Ghulām Rasool Bafvi) was an Indian Islamic scholar and one of the earliest teachers of Darul Uloom Deoband. He served as a teacher in Darul Uloom Deoband for about thirty one years. His teachers included Syed Ahmad Dehlavi and Mahmud Hasan Deobandi. His students included Abdur Rahim Popalzai, Anwar Shah Kashmiri, Asghar Hussain Deobandi, Hussain Ahmad Madani, Izaz Ali Amrohi, Kifayatullah Dehlawi, Manazir Ahsan Gilani, Muhammad Sahool Bhagalpuri, Muhammad Tayyib Qasmi, and Shabbir Ahmad Usmani.

== Early life and education ==
Ghulam Rasool Hazarvi was born in c. 1854 in Baffa, Hazara district (now Mansehra district, Khyber Pakhtunkhwa) to Abdul Ghaffar bin Abdul Rahman.

He received his early education from the scholars of his region. For higher education, he enrolled in Darul Uloom Deoband and graduated in 1886 (1303 AH). He studied Sahih al-Bukhari with Syed Ahmad Dehlavi and Mahmud Hasan Deobandi. He received permission (Ijazah) in Hadith from Rashid Ahmad Gangohi in 1888 (1305 AH).

== Career ==
In 1890 (1307 AH) he was appointed as a teacher in Darul Uloom Deoband and from that time until 1918 (1337 AH) i.e. until his death, he served as a teacher in Darul Uloom for about thirty one years.

== Notable students ==
His notable students included Abdur Rahim Popalzai, Abdus Sami Deobandi, Anwar Shah Kashmiri, Muhammad Sadiq Karachi, Asghar Hussain Deobandi, Hussain Ahmad Madani, Izaz Ali Amrohi, Kifayatullah Dehlawi, Manazir Ahsan Gilani, Muhammad Sahool Bhagalpuri, Muhammad Rasool Khan Hazarvi,Muhammad Tayyib Qasmi, and Shabbir Ahmad Usmani.

== Personal life ==
He was married to the sister of Gul Hasan Bafvi, a classfellow of Hussain Ahmad Madani and a Darul Uloom Deoband's graduate of 1315 AH (1897 AD), and they had a male child, Muhammad Yaqub Bafvi (d. 1973).

== Death ==
Hazarvi died on 24 October 1918 (17 Muharram 1337 AH) in Deoband and was buried near the grave of Muhammad Qasim Nanautawi in Qasmi Cemetery.

After hearing the news of Hazarvi's demise, Hazarvi's teacher, Mahmud Hasan Deobandi, wrote a marsiya from the prison of Malta, in which he expressed his grief and sorrow over Hazarvi's demise.

== See also ==
- List of Deobandis
