= Mahtab Ali Deobandi =

Indian Muslim scholar (died 1887)

Personal life
- Born: Unknown
- Died: 1293 AH / 1877 CE (disputed; possibly 1304 AH / 1887 CE) Deoband, India
- Era: 19th century
- Region: India
- Main interest: Islamic education
- Notable work: Contributions to the founding of Darul Uloom Deoband
- Relatives: Zulfiqar Ali Deobandi (younger brother), Mahmud Hasan Deobandi (nephew)

Religious life
- Religion: Islam
- Denomination: Sunni
- Creed: Hanafi

Senior posting
- Students: Muhammad Qasim Nanautawi, Zulfiqar Ali Deobandi, Mahmud Hasan Deobandi
- Influenced by: Mamluk Ali Nanautawi, Sadruddin Khan Azurda Dehlawi

Mahtab Ali Deobandi (died 1293 AH / 1877 CE) was an Indian Muslim scholar and one of the early founders of Darul Uloom Deoband. He was a member of the institution’s first governing council (Majlis-e-Shura) and participated in its establishment and early development.

== Early life and education ==
Mahtab Ali Deobandi was the eldest son of Sheikh Fath Ali of Deoband. His younger brother, Zulfiqar Ali Deobandi, was also among the founders of Darul Uloom Deoband.

He studied at Delhi College (then known as Delhi Arabic College), where he was a student of Mamluk Ali Nanautawi and Sadruddin Khan Azurda Dehlawi. After completing his studies, he returned to Deoband. Coming from a prosperous family, he did not take up employment but instead began teaching locally.

== Career ==
Ali taught Arabic in a madrasa located in the guest house (baithak) of Sheikh Karamat Husain, a local notable of Deoband. Among his pupils at this madrasa were Muhammad Qasim Nanautawi, who later founded Darul Uloom Deoband, and Zulfiqar Ali Deobandi. He was about eleven years senior to Nanautawi. Other early students included Nihal Ahmad, one of the initial supporters of Darul Uloom.

=== Role in Darul Uloom Deoband ===
When the idea of founding Darul Uloom Deoband emerged in 1866, Sayyid Muhammad Abid first consulted Mahtab Ali for advice and financial contribution. Ali was one of the earliest donors to the project, providing the second recorded contribution after Sayyid Muhammad Abid.

According to Syed Mehboob Rizwi and Asir Adrawi, the first donation for the seminary was given by Sayyid Muhammad Abid, followed by Mahtab Ali. The first public appeal for funds was later issued on 19 Muharram 1283 AH (1866 CE), in which his name appeared after those of Sayyid Muhammad and Muhammad Qasim Nanautawi.

Ali became a founding member of the Majlis-e-Shura (governing council) of Darul Uloom and served from 1283 AH (1866) until about 1304 AH (1887). He often examined students during the seminary's annual examinations.

=== Students ===
Ali taught several figures who later played important roles in Islamic scholarship. Among them were:

- Muhammad Qasim Nanautawi – studied early Arabic texts with him.
- Zulfiqar Ali Deobandi – his younger brother and father of Mahmud Hasan Deobandi.
- Mahmud Hasan Deobandi indirectly benefited, as Ali was his uncle and teacher of his father.

== Death ==
According to Syed Mehboob Rizwi, Ali died in 1293 AH (1877 CE). Muhammad Tayyib Qasmi recorded his membership of the governing council until 1304 AH (1887 CE). Muhammadullah Khalili Qasmi, after reconciling these reports, suggested that 1304 AH is the more likely year of his death.
