= Z. A. Shamsul Haq =

Bangladeshi magistrate (born 1929)

- Born: 23 October 1929; Vouria, Daudkandi, Comilla, Bangladesh
- Occupations: Government servant, scouter and social worker
- Years active: 1958–1988
- Known for: Founder of Metropolitan Magistracy of Bangladesh and founder CMM of Dhaka Metropolitan City
- Spouse: Firoj Jahan
- Children: 5

Z. A. Shamsul Haq (born 23 October 1929) was appointed as the first CMM-Chief Metropolitan Magistrate of Dhaka Bangladesh in 1979. He served as the Chief of Dhaka Metropolitan Magistracy for over a decade and retired in 1988, but continues to work as an adviser to the Bangladesh Scouts. His book, Handbook for Magistrates, was published in 1990 and acts as a guide for other Magistrates.
