= Pakistan Scouts =

Pakistan Scouts may be:

- Gilgit-Baltistan Scouts
- Gilgit Scouts
- Pakistan Boy Scouts Association
