= Abdur Rahim Popalzai =

Indian freedom fighter and scholar

Abdur Rahim Popalzai II

Personal life
- Born: 1890 Peshawar, British India
- Died: 1944 (aged 53–54) Peshawar, British India
- Education: Darul Uloom Deoband
- Known for: Freedom Movement against British rule in India
- Occupation: Religious scholar, poet and journalist

Religious life
- Religion: Islam

Muslim leader
- Teacher: Mahmud Hasan Deobandi, Ghulam Rasool Hazarvi

Maulana Abdur Rahim Popalzai II was a freedom fighter, religious scholar, poet, and journalist in the united India. Born in 1890 in Peshawar, Popalzai spent his entire life in the struggle to liberate the people from slavery and the exploitative capitalist system. Popalzai established a seminary at Masjid Qasim Ali Khan, launched an organization, Nojawanan-i-Sarhad, and a newspaper, Chingari, to educate the people and create awareness among them about their rights. Maulana Abdur Rahim Popalzai led demonstrations against discriminatory laws like the Frontier Crimes Regulation against the people of the province. Maulana Popalzai married in 1918. He had a daughter, Safia Begum, and a son, Abdul Rauf. He died in 1944.

== Role in the Freedom movement ==
Popalzai took part in the Khilafat Movement in his teens. He regularly published a journal by the name of Sarfaroosh and remained engaged in the freedom movement against the British throughout his life. With his leftist leanings, he and other "comrades" set up a youth organisation called Nawajan Bharat Sabha. When the British banned Nawajan Baharat Sabha, he was elected head of the Socialist Party. Abdur Rahim Popalzai II played a leading role in the events which lead up to the Qissa Khwani massacre and was sentenced to nine years in prison for his role in the uprising. Popalzai borrowed his anti-imperialist ideology from Maulana Obaidullah Sindhi and Maulana Hussain Ahmed Madani. In 1939, Abdur Rahim Popalzai II protested in Bannu against the British bombing of Waziristan, for which he was sentenced to five years imprisonment.

== Education ==
All his five elder brothers died young. Thus Abdul Rahim remained the elder living son of Abdul Hakim. According to their family tradition, Abdul Hakim taught his son at home until 1908. Abdul Rahim learned from his father the meaning and virtues of simplicity, kindness, asceticism, abstinence and mysticism. With completion of his basic study, Abdul Hakim sent him to Rampur, Delhi for further study, and later to Darul Uloom Deoband where he became a student of Mahmud Hasan Deobandi. He received a certificate from Sheikh-ul-Hind in Hadith. Maulana Popalzai completed his studies at Deoband and returned Peshawar in 1912.

== Political Education ==
He attached himself to the movement of Shah Waliullah under the able leadership of Mahmud-ul-Hassan who trained him on particular lines and introduced him to all the workers of the movement in and outside India. Maulana was very much impressed by the methods and tactics of the Marxists and it was one of the reasons that he was dubbed in his lifetime as "Marxist Maulana".
