= Salimullah Fahmi =

Scouter

Abdul Makarim Salimullah Fahmi (1905 – 1975) was a Bengali bureaucrat who served in the government of British India and Pakistan. He was a notable poet and writer of Urdu language. The Bangladesh Scouts was formed under his leadership.

== Early life ==
Fahmi was born in March 1905. He graduated from Presidency College, Calcutta, in 1925.

== Career ==
Fahmi was placed in charge of the refugee camps that houses Muslims fleeing the 1946 Bihar riots. He worked closely with the future President of Bangladesh Sheikh Mujibur Rahman in managing the refugee camps.

On 22 May 1948, Fahmi founded the East Bengal Scout Association which would become the Bangladesh Scouts after the Independence of Bangladesh.

Fahmi was the Joint Secretary of the Ministry of Food and Agriculture of the Government of Pakistan. He supported the development of the Institute of Fine Arts at the University of Dhaka.

Fahmi wrote a collection of poems in Urdu called Zauq-e-Salim. He was a member of the Pakistan Historical Society. He was the General Manager of Agriculture Development Bank of Pakistan.

== Personal life ==
Fahmi was married to Sayeeda Salim Fahmi. Their daughter Khalida Fahmi (1931-2014) would go on to become the Deputy Director General of Bangladesh Television, first Muslim woman to hold the position in South Asia.

== Death and legacy ==
Fahmi died in 1975. Salimullah Fahmi Primary Memorial School in Pakistan is named after him. His collection of Urdu and Persian books and scripts were donated to the Dacca Museum and the National Institute of Public Administration.
