= Uzair Gul Peshawari =

Pakistani Islamic scholar and activist (1886–1989)

Mawlāna Uzair Gul Peshawari
- Sami-ul-Haq (right) with Uzair Gul Peshawari

Personal life
- Born: 1886 Ziarat Kaka Sahib, British India (present-day Pakistan)
- Died: 17 November 1989 (aged 102–103) Peshawar, NWFP, Pakistan
- Education: Darul Uloom Deoband
- Known for: Silk Letter Movement

Religious life
- Religion: Islam

Muslim leader
- Disciple of: Mahmud Hasan Deobandi

Uzair Gul Peshawari (1886 – 17 November 1989) was an Islamic scholar and an activist of the Indian freedom struggle against British rule who actively participated in the Silk Letter Movement. He was an alumnus of the Darul Uloom Deoband and served as the head-teacher of Madrasa Rahmania in Roorkee.

== Biography ==
Gul hailed from Ziarat Kaka Sahib, a town located in Peshawar. He completed his primary studies with local teachers and moved to Darul Uloom Deoband, where he studied with Mahmud Hasan Deobandi. He graduated from Darul Uloom in 1331 A.H. During Khilafat Movement, Gul was made the president of Khilafat Committee in Deoband. He was a close companion of Mahmud Hasan Deobandi and was imprisoned along with him in Malta for his role in the Silk Letter Movement.

He served as a teacher at Darul Uloom Deoband and before World War II, he was appointed as a head-teacher in Madrasa Rahmania in Roorkee.

In 1945, Gul moved to his native place in Peshawar along with his English wife Beatrice Cooke.

Gul died on 17 November 1989.

== Family ==
Gul's first wife was a daughter of Mahmud Hasan Deobandi's niece. During his stay at Roorkee, he married a new Muslim English woman named Beatrice Cooke. Gul's second wife Cooke also wrote an English translation of Quran which remains unpublished.

== Legacy ==
- At University of Peshawar, Murad Ali Shah wrote a Master of Arts thesis entitled Mawlāna Uzair Gul-The Prisoner of Malta.
- At University of Islamabad, Farzana Nisar wrote a Master of Philosophy thesis entitled Mawlāna Uzair Gul (Aseer-i-Malta): His Life and Achievements.

== See also ==
- List of Deobandis
