= Mohammad Ayyub Qadiri =

Pakistani writer

Muhammad Ayub Qadri
- Born: 28 July 1926; Aonla, Uttar Pradesh, British India
- Died: 25 November 1983 (aged 57); Karachi, Pakistan
- Education: PhD in Urdu prose evolution up to 1857
- Alma mater: Federal Urdu College (now University)
- Occupations: Urdu scholar, historian, biographer, translator, educator

Muhammad Ayub Qadri was an Urdu scholar, historian, biographer, translator and educator from Pakistan.

Muhammad Ayub Qadri was born on 28 July 1926 in Aonla, Uttar Pradesh, British India. He learned Persian from his father, Maulvi Mushitullah Qadri, and Arabic from Hakim Abdul Ghafoor, a well-known scholar and elder in his hometown. He passed the Intermediate Examination in Budaun before migrating to Pakistan in 1950. In Pakistan, he first settled in Dadu District of Sindh and then in Karachi. He did BA from then Federal Urdu College (now University) in 1956 and joined Pakistan Historical Society as a Research Officer.

Qadri's writings include Arbab Fazl and Kamal Bareli, Maulana Faiz Ahmad Badayuni, Makhdoom Jahanian Jahan Gasht, Maulana Muhammad Ahsan Nanotvi, Jang-e-Azadi 1857 and Caravan Rafta. He also translated many important Persian books into Urdu. These include Tazkira Ulema-i-Hind, Ma'asir al-umara, Jumulah Wasaya Arba'a, Farhat-ul-Nazareen and Tabaqat-e-Akbari. He also wrote footnotes to many important and rare books. He received his PhD by writing a dissertation on the role of scholars in the evolution of Urdu prose in northern India up to 1857.

== Authorship ==
- Lulu Azghib (Shiv Lal) (Sequence)
- Knowledge and Action Volume I (Abdul Qadir Khani, Maulvi Moinuddin Afzal Garhi) (Translation)
- Articles World Day
- Political, cultural and scientific history of the Bangash era
- Collection of Wisaya Arba'a (translation)
- War of Independence 1857
- Calligraphy
- Sir Al-Arifin (Hamid bin Fazlullah Jamali) (translation)
- Mather Al-Amra – Volume I, II, III (by Samsam Al-Dawlah Shahnawaz Khan) (Translation)
- Tabaqat Akbari (from Khawaja Nizamuddin Ahmed) (translation)
- Maulana Muhammad Ahsan Nanotavi
- Historical review of Tablighi Jamaat
- Marqa Shahabi
- Makhdoom Jahanian where patrol
- Maulana Faiz Ahmad Badawi
- Mention of Indian Scholars (Translation)
- The role of scholars in the evolution of Urdu prose in northern India until 1857 (PhD dissertation)
- Syed Altaf Ali Barelvi: Life and Services
- Lord of grace and perfection
- Caravan is gone
- Ghalib and Asr Ghalib

== Death ==
Qadri died in a traffic accident in Karachi, Pakistan on 25 November 1983 and buried in Sakhi Hassan's graveyard in Karachi.
