= Syed Ahmad Dehlavi (academic) =

British Indian Islamic scholar (d. 1894)

2nd Principal and Sheikh al-Hadith of Darul Uloom Deoband
- In office 1884–1890
- Preceded by: Yaqub Nanautawi
- Succeeded by: Mahmud Hasan Deobandi

Personal life
- Died: 1894 AD (1311 AH) Bhopal, Bhopal State, British India
- Occupation: Islamic scholar, muhaddith

Religious life
- Religion: Islam
- Denomination: Sunni Islam
- Jurisprudence: Hanafi
- Creed: Maturidi

Syed Ahmad Dehlavi (died 1894) was an Indian Muslim academician and hadith scholar who served as the second principal and Sheikh al-Hadith of Darul Uloom Deoband between 1884 and 1890. He specialised in Islamic astronomy and mathematics. His students included Abdul Hayy Hasani, Murtaza Hasan Chandpuri, Mahmud Hasan Deobandi, Aziz-ul-Rahman Usmani, Muhammad Yasin Deobandi, Ubaidullah Sindhi, and Ashraf Ali Thanwi.

== Biography ==
Syed Ahmed Dehlvi belonged to a Sayyid family in Delhi. His father, Maulvi Imamuddin, privately tutored Mughal princes, and his maternal uncle, Mir Syed Mehboob Ali Jafari, was a student of Shah Abdul Aziz Dehlavi.

Syed pledged allegiance to Qasim Nanawtawi in Sufism. In 1868 AD (1285 AH), he began his career as a teacher at Darul Uloom Deoband and succeeded Yaqub Nanautawi as the seminary's second principal and Sheikh al-Hadith (Senior Professor of Hadith) in 1886 (Rabi' al-Thani 1302 AH). He resigned from the seminary in 1890 AD (1307 AH) and joined Madrasa Jahangiri in Bhopal as principal and rector at the invitation of Shah Jahan Begum.

During his tenure as principal at Darul Uloom Deoband, thirty students completed graduation in Dars-e-Nizami, including Ghulam Rasool Hazarvi and Murtaza Hasan Chandpuri. Mahmud Hasan Deobandi, Muhammad Yasin Deobandi, Ubaidullah Sindhi, Aziz-ul-Rahman Usmani, Ashraf Ali Thanwi, and Abdul Hayy Hasani were also among his students in Deoband and Bhopal, respectively.

He died in Bhopal in 1894 (1311 AH).

== See also ==
- List of Deobandis
