= Balochistan Boy Scouts Association =

- Location: Balochistan
- Country: Pakistan
- Founded: 1920, 1943
- Membership: 75,000
- Chief Secretary: Sabir Hussain Shah
- Affiliation: Pakistan Boy Scouts Association, World Organization of the Scout Movement
- Website www.bbsapk.org

Balochistan Boy Scouts Association BBSA is a provincial Scouting organisation of Balochistan in Pakistan. Scouting exists in all 30 districts of Balochistan, with more than 75,000 scout volunteers. It is affiliated with World Organization of the Scout Movement through Pakistan Boy Scouts Association

The BBSA is a Non Government Organization (NGO) which has no connection with the armed forces of the country or any departments of the government. The organisation has two structures, provincial and District.

== History ==
Scouting in Balochistan can be traced back to 1938 when a piece of land was acquired for the purpose of scout training headquarters. In 1943 a permanent Scout unit of Islamia High School presented the Guard of honour to Quaid-e-Azam Muhammad Ali Jinnah on his arrival at Quetta in 1943. The Governor General of Balochistan Sir Obroy Metcof inaugurated the Balochistan Scouts Association (BSA) Headquarters in November 1943. After the creation of Pakistan, and Pakistan Scout Association, Balochistan Scout Association became the provincial branch of Pakistan Boy Scouts Association.

== Scout Mission and Vision ==
To contribute in the education of young people through a value system, based on the Scout Oath and to help build a better world where people are self-fulfilled as individuals and play a constructive role in the society.

As a global movement, making a contribution to creating a better world

== Facilities ==
Balochistan Boy Scouts Association has halls mainly used for youth training, conferences, seminars, meetings, sessions, exhibition, events, workshops, and symposium.

All hall names are associated with the names of great Scouters of the past and a martyr scout.

== Scout and Community ==
- Earthquake Response
- Services in IDP Camps
- Polio Campaign

== See also ==
Pakistan Girl Guides Association
