= Ubaid Iqbal Asim =

Indian Muslim scholar and writer (born 1959)

Dr., Maulana Ubaid Iqbal Asim Qasmi
- Born: 25 July 1959 (age 67); Deoband, Saharanpur District, Uttar Pradesh, India
- Other name: Dr. Obaid Iqbal Asim
- Education: Darul Uloom Deoband; Aligarh Muslim University
- Occupations: Islamic scholar, researcher, writer, journalist
- Notable work: "Ghubar-e-Khatir Aur Uska She'iri Sarmaya", "Ijtimai Nizam-e-Zakat", "Maulana Zafar Ahmad Usmani Thanvi: Ek Mutala", "Deoband: Tareekh-o-Tahzeeb Ke Aaine Mein"
- Father: Iqbal Ilahi Usmani
- Relatives: Usmani family of Deoband

Ubaid Iqbal Asim (born 25 July 1959), also written as Obaid Iqbal Asim, is an Indian Muslim scholar, writer, researcher, and biographer, known for his contributions to literature and research. A native of Deoband, Uttar Pradesh, he completed his early and higher education at Darul Uloom Deoband and pursued Master of Arts in Arabic from Aligarh Muslim University in 1996. He later earned his Ph.D. in 2002 from the same university, focusing on the life and contributions of Zafar Ahmad Usmani. His works primarily address scholarly and social issues.

== Early life and education ==
Ubaid Iqbal Asim was born on 25 July 1959 (19 Muharram 1379 AH) in Deoband, Uttar Pradesh.

He began his educational journey at Darul Uloom Deoband, where he completed the Dars-e-Nizami course in 1980. He later pursued an M.A. in Arabic at Aligarh Muslim University in 1996 and obtained his Ph.D. in Arabic in 2002.

== Career ==
Asim has played an active role on social and educational fronts. He has served as the General Secretary of the Aligarh Zakat Fund, Secretary of the All India Education Movement and the Uttar Pradesh Rabta Committee.

He is also a member of the Central Committee of the All India Majlis-e-Mushawarat and the All India Educational Caravan.

He has been associated with Aligarh Muslim University in some capacity.

Asim was honored with the Sir Syed Awareness Forum Award 2019 for his outstanding contributions in his field during the 10th National Seminar organized by the Sir Syed Awareness Forum at Aligarh Mahotsav.

== Literary works ==
Asim has mastery over Urdu and Arabic languages and has authored numerous books and research articles on academic and scholarly topics. His notable works include Ghubar-e-Khatir aur Uska Sha'iri Sarmaya, Ijtimai Nizam-e-Zakat, and Insaaf Ki Dastak. He also authored a book titled Deoband: Tareekh-o-Tahzeeb ke Aaine Mein, which explores the history and culture of Deoband.

He earned his Ph.D. by writing a thesis on the life and contributions of Zafar Ahmad Usmani. His literary journey began with contributions to the wall magazines of Darul Uloom Deoband and later expanded to writing for various journals and magazines. He served as the editor of the fortnightly Ijtima (Deoband) from 1985 to 1986, and was previously the joint editor of the monthly Ilmi Sada (Delhi) and the monthly Rabta Bulletin (Aligarh). Additionally, he regularly contributes to leading newspapers such as Rashtriya Sahara (Delhi), Azad Hind (Kolkata), Munsif (Hyderabad), and Inquilab (Delhi).

=== Books ===
Asim's works include:

- Ghubar-e-Khatir aur Uska She'ri Sarmaya (a book containing the interpretation of Arabic, Urdu and Persian poems recorded in Ghubar-e-Khatir)
- Ijtimai Nizam-e-Zakat (Collective Zakat System)
- Insaaf Ki Dastak (The knock of justice)
- Maulana Zafar Ahmad Usmani Thanvi: Ek Mutala (Zafar Ahmad Usmani: A Study)
- Maulana Ashraf Ali Thanvi ki Quran Fahmi (A study of Ashraf Ali Thanwi's Quranic scholarship; ISBN 978-93-91601-24-9)
- Deoband: Tareekh-o-Tahzeeb ke Aaine Mein (Deoband – In the Mirror of History and Civilization)
- Baatein Mulaqatein (Compilation of articles by Shahid Zuberi)
- Para-e-'am ke Mozu'aat wa Mazameen (Topics and articles of the 30th Juz' of Quran)
- Sawaneh Maulana Mansoor Ansari – Sada Muhajir (Biography of Muhammad Mian Mansoor Ansari, co-authored with Arshad Mansoor Ghazi)
- Syed Hamid (Biography of Syed Hamid)
- Zikr-e-Ghazi (Biography of Hamid al-Ansari Ghazi)

== See also ==
- List of Deobandis
