= Bangladesh Scouts =

National scout organization of Bangladesh

- Bengali: বাংলাদেশ স্কাউটস
- Headquarters: 60 Anjuman Mofidul Islam Road, Kakrail, Dhaka-1000
- Location: 23°44′15.40″N 90°24′38.50″E
- Country: Bangladesh
- Founded: Boy Scouting: 11 September 1972; Girl-In-Scouting: 24 March 1994
- Membership: 2,261,351
- Chief Scout: President of Bangladesh
- President: Nasimul Goni
- Chief National Commissioner: A. B. M. Abdus Sattar
- Affiliation: World Organization of the Scout Movement
- Website www.scouts.gov.bd service.scouts.gov.bd

The Bangladesh Scouts (Bengali: বাংলাদেশ স্কাউটস) is the national Scouting organization of Bangladesh. Currently the Chief Scout of Bangladesh is Mirza Fakhrul Islam Alamgir who is also the President of Bangladesh. Despite Scouting being started in the subcontinent in 1910, Indian boys were barred from participating. In 1918, under the leadership of Mrs. Annie Besant, the Indian Scout Association started its journey. After the success of the association, the inclusion of Subcontinental boys was legalized and "The Bengal Boy Scout Association" was formed in 1920. During the Pakistani period of Bangladesh's history, Scouting was done jointly under the Pakistan Boy Scouts Association and stayed like that until the country's division in 1971 during the Bangladesh Liberation War. Following its independence, the Bangladesh Boy Scout Association was officially formed in 1972. Bangladesh became an independent member of the World Organization of the Scout Movement in 1974. The organization changed its name to "Bangladesh Scouts" in 1978. The organization has 2,261,351 members as of 2021.

== History ==
Scouting in modern Bangladesh started as part of the British Indian branch of The Scout Association. After the partition of India, the "East Pakistan Boy Scout Association" was formed as a regional association within the Pakistan Boy Scouts Association by Salimullah Fahmi.

Scouting was officially founded in British India in 1909, first starting at the Bishop Cotton Boys' School in Bangalore. Scouting for native Indians was started by Justice Vivian Bose, Pandit Madan Mohan Malaviya, Pandit Hridayanath Kunzru, Girija Shankar Bajpai, Annie Besant and George Arundale, in 1913. Prior to this date, Scouting was open only for British and foreign Scouts. On 4 February 1914, Sir Robert Scallon, British Commander of the Concentration at Dhaka, visited St. Gregory's School in Dhaka – at that time purely European and Eurasian (Anglo) School. As the Boy Scouts were unknown in Dhaka, with only four Troops existing down in Calcutta, Sir Robert invited the boys to try and establish a troop.

Mr. Francis, Organizer of the Boy Scouts, came with Captain Pakenham Walsh and his lantern photos on the work of the Boy Scouts. That was on 2 March 1914, Mr. Francis, as Scoutmaster of the area, enrolled six of the school's boys who had passed the Tenderfoot Test. The final approval by the Bengal Provincial Commissioner was signed by Mr. H Beuran. It lists Serjt. R Narnett, Inspector of Police as pro-term Scoutmaster, Brother Bertin, then the Headmaster of the School gave all encouragement, Bro. Vital was named as Assistant Scoutmaster on probation.

The Troop was officially named: The FIRST DHAKA, St. Gregory's Troop NUMBER ONE. The date on the Approval was 7 May 1914. The Scoutmaster was Mr. Harnett. The total strength of the Troop was forty boys, as of 27 April 1914.

The British Official Approval, Dalil lists St. Gregory's as the First Troop in the Dhaka or East Bengal area. Later on, separate groups in Calcutta were entitled One to Four, and St. Gregory's became Fifth Troop of the Bengal Presidency. The first scouts were David Pogose, Peter Gomes, Alfred Ferguson, Harold Armstead, Cyril Lucas and Osmund D'Silva. The school had Five Patrols and Mr. Francis listed the total number of Scouts as 40, to be going on their first camp in January 1915.

In 1916, a Cub section was started, followed by the Rover section in 1918.

In 1916, Calcutta's Senior Deputy Commissioner of Police J. S. Wilson introduced Scouting for Boys as a textbook in the Calcutta Police Training School. Colonel Wilson volunteered his services to the District Scout Commissioner, Alfred Pickford, and in 1917 became Assistant Scoutmaster of the Old Mission Church Troop. Together the two struggled for the admission of Indian boys into The Scout Association, which had not been admitted due to a Government of India order against it because "Scouting might train them to become revolutionaries". Shortly Wilson was acting as Cubmaster and Scoutmaster, and succeeded Pickford as District Commissioner in May 1919 when Pickford was promoted to Chief Scout Commissioner for India.

As a way of getting around the Government Order, the Boy Scouts of Bengal was founded, with identical aims and methods. Many separate Scout organizations began to spring up, the Indian Boy Scouts Association, founded in 1916, based in Madras and headed by Annie Besant and George Arundale; Boy Scouts of Mysore; Boy Scouts of Baroda; Nizam's Scouts in Hyderabad; Seva Samiti Scout Association (Humanity Uplift Service Society), founded in 1917 by Madan Mohan Malaviya and Hridayanath Kunzru and based in Allahabad; the aforementioned Boy Scouts of Bengal and likely others. A conference was held in Calcutta in August 1920 in which Wilson staged a Scout Rally, and as a result the Viceroy of India sent an invitation to Lord Baden-Powell, by then Chief Scout of the World, to visit India. Lord and Lady Baden-Powell arrived in Bombay in late January 1921 for a short tour of the subcontinent before leaving Calcutta for Rangoon. Alfred Pickford accompanied them and became one of their closest friends.

The result of this visit was a union of all of the Scout organizations except the Seva Samiti Scout Association into The Boy Scouts Association in India. In 1922 Pickford returned to England and was appointed Overseas Commissioner of The Boy Scouts Association at their headquarters in London, but his dream of allowing local boys into the program had been fulfilled.

In 1938, a number of members left the Boy Scouts Association in India after a wave of nationalism. They formed – together with the Seva Samiti Scout Association and the newly founded India National Scout Association – the Hindustan Scout Association, the first coeducational Scouting and Guiding organization in India. In the same year, the Boy Scouts Association in India became a member of the World Organization of the Scout Movement.

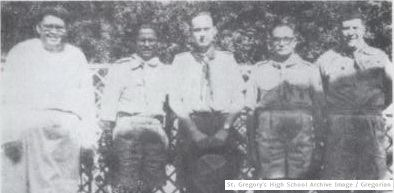
From left to right – Brother Peter C.S.C., Headmaster St. Gregory; Nicholas Rozario, Deputy Camp Chief (East Pakistan); J. S. Wilson, Director of International Bureau; Squadron Leader H.V. Bhatty, Scout Provincial Secretary and A.R. Sardar Hussain, Scout Camp Chief for Pakistan

J. S. Wilson, Director of the Boy Scouts International Bureau, visited Karachi in 1952 as guest of J.D. Shuja, the General Secretary of the Pakistan Boy Scouts Association. During his visit, he saw Bhit Island, off Karachi, a fishing community primarily of refugees, who had been adopted by a Karachi Scout group, the Rovers and older Scouts of which were staffing a school until a regular teacher could be appointed. In Bahawalpur, Wilson was welcomed by Brigadier M.A. Abbasi, Deputy Chief Scout Commissioner who had been at the 1951 World Jamboree in Austria and would later lead the Pakistani contingent at the 1957 Jubilee Jamboree. At Lahore, Wilson met the Scouts and Bluebirds (Brownies) of the Deaf and Dumb Institute, and visited A.R. Sardar Hussain, Scout Camp Chief for Pakistan, Squadron Leader H.V. Bhatty, Scout Provincial Secretary, Nicholas Rozario, Deputy Camp Chief (East Pakistan), and Mir M. Mohsin, Deputy Camp Chief (West Pakistan), who later succeeded Shuja as General Secretary.

In 1958, the second National Jamboree of the Pakistan Boy Scouts Association was held at Chittagong with 4,000 participants. The fifth National Jamboree of the Pakistan Boy Scouts Association in 1969 used the grounds of the new training center of the East Pakistan Boy Scouts Association at Mouchak.

Scouting continued in East and West Pakistan as part of the Pakistan Boy Scouts Association until the country was split in the 1970s.

During the Bangladesh Liberation War, in April 1971, members of the renamed "Bangladesh Boy Scout Association" volunteered to carry the mail from the Bangladesh Army field post offices to the nearest Post Office in India. In 1972, the First National Council of Scouting in Bangladesh was held in 8 and 9 April, and during the council on 9 April 1972 the "Bangladesh Boy Scout Association" was officially formed as successor of the East Pakistan Boy Scout Association. Pear Ali Nazir (CSP) was elected as first National commissioner. On 11 September 1972 The Government of The People's Republic of Bangladesh approved the Scout Association by the Ordinance No. 111/1972.

On 1 June 1974 "Bangladesh Boy Scout Association" became the 105th independent member of the World Organization of the Scout Movement. Both predecessors, the British Indian branch of The Scout Association as well as the Pakistan Boy Scouts Association were also members of the World Organization of the Scout Movement during their activity in modern Bangladesh.

Later on 30 December 1978 the organization changed its name to "Bangladesh Scouts". Since 1994, girls are accepted as members.

== Outreach ==
Scouting has grown over the years in the face of considerable difficulties. Scouts are involved in community service, major areas being agriculture, health and sanitation, child welfare, community development, construction and repair of low cost housing and sports.

During national disasters, such as the many floods that strike Bangladesh, Scouts are called to help with flood control, relocation of citizens and organizing shelters.

Membership is open to youth between 6 and 25 years of age, regardless of caste, creed or color. Bangladesh Scouts receive strong support from the government, which recognized Scouting's value in citizenship training.

By 2013, Bangladesh Scouts envisions to grow membership by 1.5 million by offering challenging youth program through a value based educational system, in partnership with government, agencies and community towards building a better world.

== Program and ideals ==
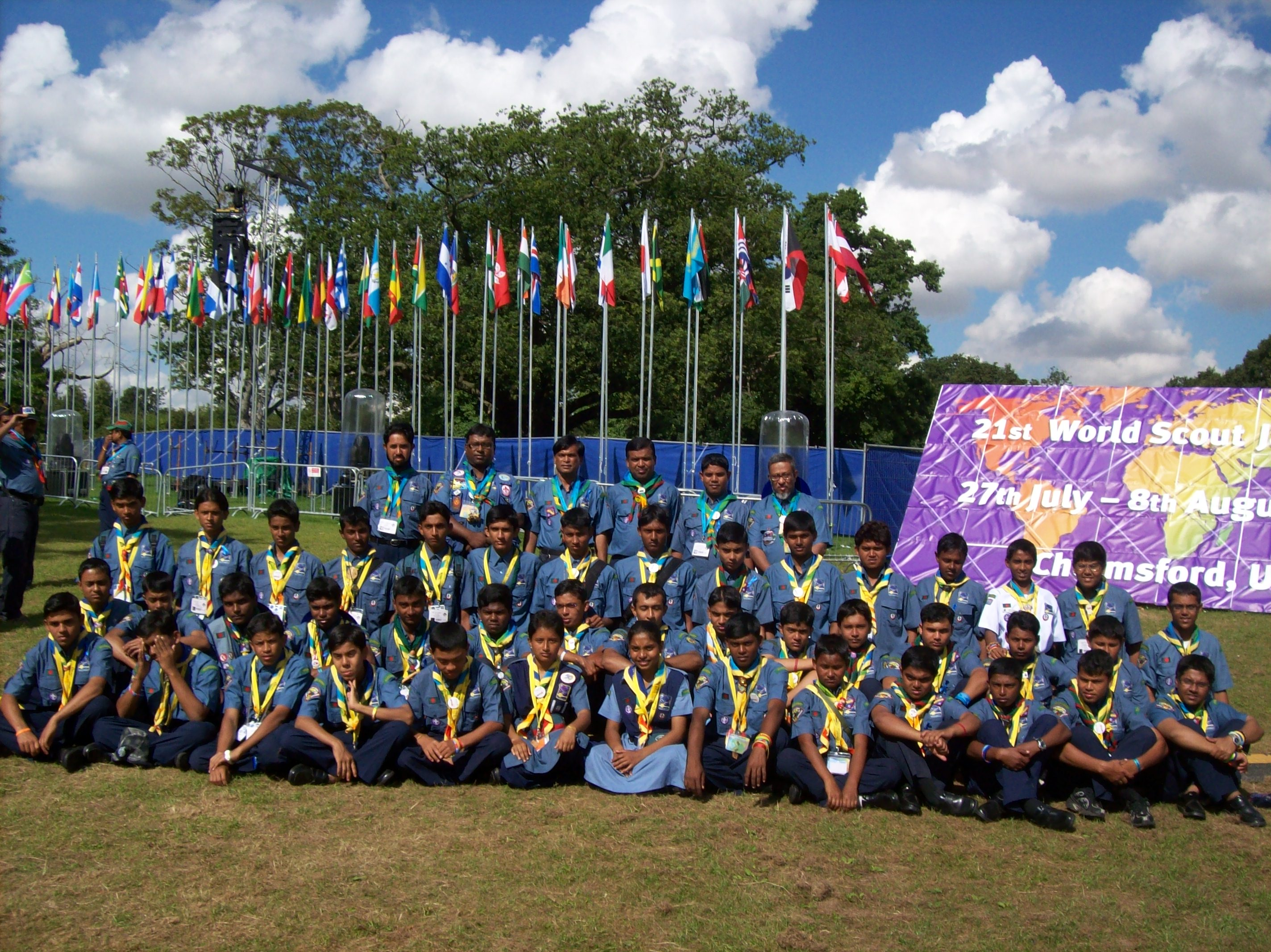
Bangladesh Scouts Contingent on 21st World Scout Jamboree

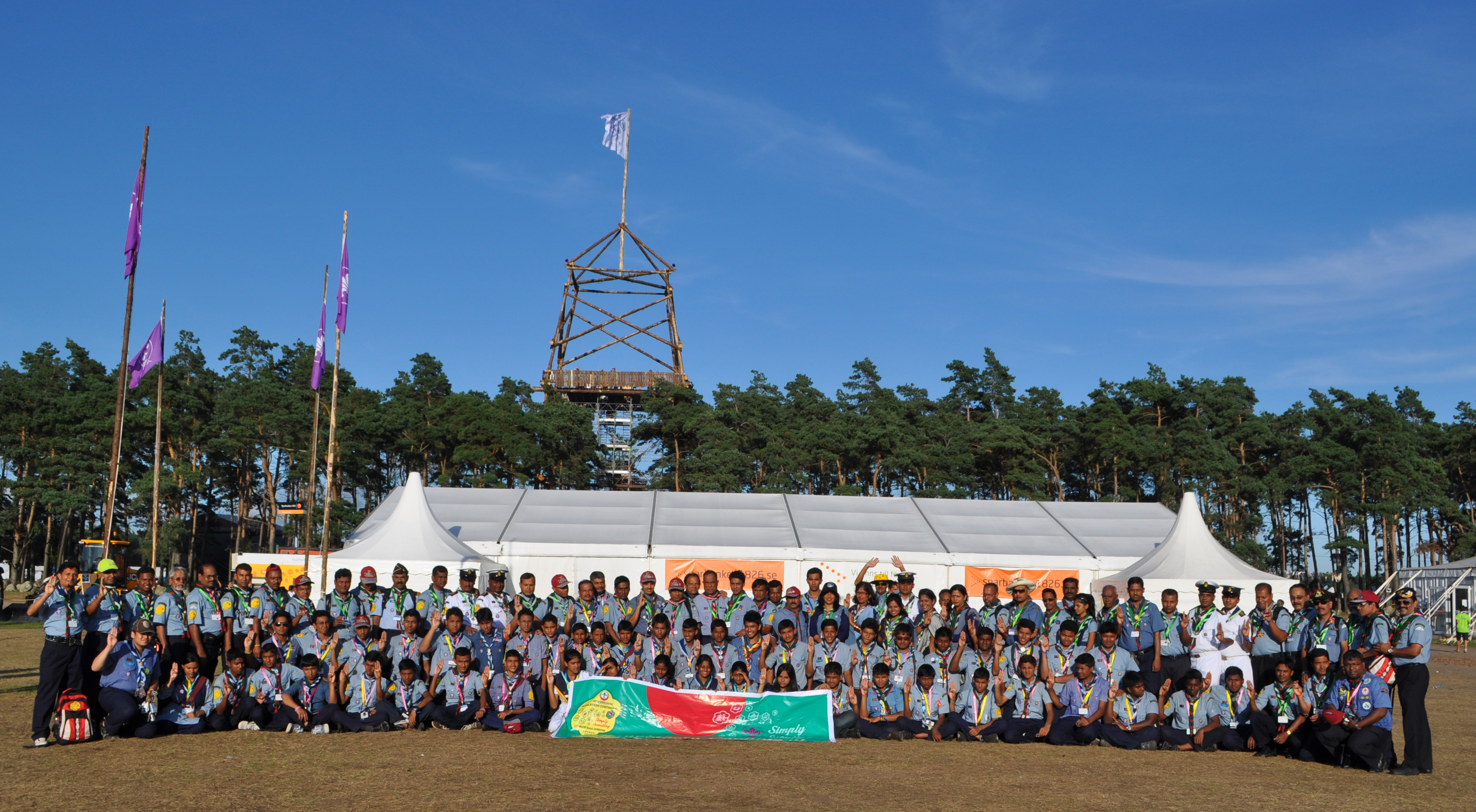
Bangladesh Scouts Contingent on 22nd World Scout Jamboree

- Cub Scouts – ages 6 to 10
- Scouts – ages 11 to 16
- Rover Scouts – ages 17 to 25

The monogram of the Bangladesh Scouts incorporates elements of the flag of Bangladesh as well as the crescent moon as a symbol of service and the white background as the symbol of peace.

=== Purpose of the Scout Movement ===
The purpose of the Scout movement is to contribute to the development of young people in achieving their full physical, intellectual, social and spiritual potentials as individuals, as responsible citizens and members of their local, national and international communities.

=== Principles of the Scout Movement ===
The Scout movement is based on three broad principles: "Duty to the creator", "Duty to others", and "Duty to self".

=== Scout Method ===
The Scout method is defined as a system of progressive self-education through:

- Promise and law.
- Learning by doing.
- Membership of small groups.
- Progressive and stimulating programs.

=== Fundamentals of Scouting ===
Scouting is a voluntary non political educational movement for the young people, open to all without distinction of origin, race or creed in accordance with the purpose, principles and method conceived by the founder Lord Baden Powell.

==== Mission Statement ====
The Mission of world Scouting is "to Contribute to the education of young people, through a value system based on the scout promise and law, to help build a better world where people are self fulfilled as individuals and play a constructive role in society ".

=== Scout promise ===
On my honor, I promise that I will do my best
to do my duty for the creator and my country,
to help other people at all times, and
to obey the Scout law.

আমি আমার আত্মমর্যাদার উপর নির্ভর করে প্রতিজ্ঞা
-স্রষ্টা ও আমার দেশের প্রতি কর্তব্য পালন করতে
-সর্বদা অপরকে সাহায্য করতে
-স্কাউট আইন মেনে চলতে
আমি আমার যথাসাধ্য চেষ্টা করব।

=== Scout law ===
English	স্কাউট আইন
1. A Scout's honour is to be trusted.; 2. A Scout is a friend to all.; 3. A Scout is courteous and obedient.; 4. A Scout is kind to animals.; 5. A Scout is cheerful at all times.; 6. A Scout is thrifty.; 7. A Scout is clean in thought, word and deed.	১. স্কাউট আত্মমর্যাদায় বিশ্বসী; ২. স্কাউট সকলের বন্ধু; ৩. স্কাউট বিনয়ী ও অনুগত; ৪. স্কাউট জীবের প্রতি সদয়; ৫. স্কাউট সদা প্রফুল্ল; ৬. স্কাউট মিতব্যয়ী; ৭. স্কাউট চিন্তা, কথা ও কাজে নির্মল

=== Motto ===
Cub Scout Motto: Do your best ('"যথাসাধ্য চেষ্টা করা")

Scout Motto: Be prepared ("সদা প্রস্তুত")

Rover Scout Motto: Service ("সেবা")

Combining all three we can say: Do your best to be prepared for service. ("সেবার জন্য সদা প্রস্তুত থাকতে যথাসাধ্য চেষ্টা করা")

== Uniform ==
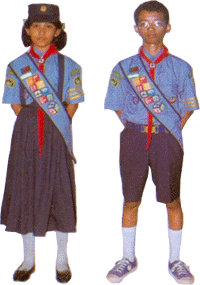
Cub Scout Uniform of Bangladesh Scouts

Cub Scouts, Scouts, Rover Scouts and adult leaders have to wear specific uniform after taking oath as a member of the Scout Movement. Despite standardization, Shirt colour sometimes differ from institution to institution, usually staying in the range of blue to a dark blue ash like colour. Each scout region has its own regional patch, worn on the sleeve. The most common type of uniform is deep blue trousers along with light blue shirt and the optional navy-blue cap with Scout region insignia emblazoned on it, with salwar-kameez(navy-blue salwar and light-blue kameez) for girls along with navy-blue cross-belt and Scout group specific scarf for everyone. Female adult leaders wear light blue saree with deep-blue blouse which has the region patch and Bangladesh sleeve patch emblazoned. Male adult leaders and Rover Scouts wear shirts with full sleeves in contrast to short-sleeved shirt for Cub Scouts and Scouts. Naval scouts have white uniforms. Everybody has to wear black shoes, optional navy blue caps with the Bangladesh Scouts monogram, and Institute specific scarves with the uniform. Scout nametags have the scouter's name written in Bengali and/or in English, inspired from the BNCC nametag design.

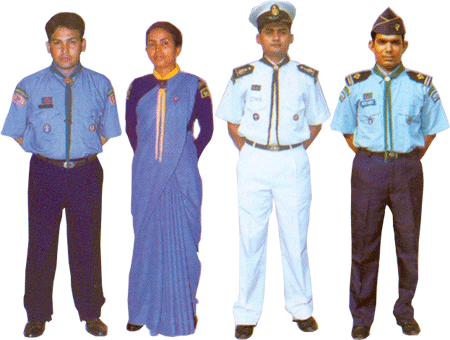
Adult Leader's Uniform of Bangladesh Scouts

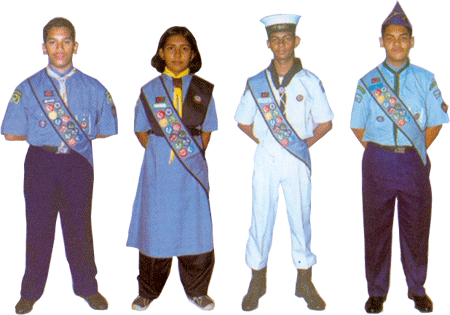
Scout Uniform of Bangladesh Scouts

Woggle design varies from institute to institute, with most school/college scout units going for a ring-type scarf woggle rather than slide-type designs in other nations. The Air region has its own custom waist belt, which is basically the same belt design used by the Bangladesh Air Force

== Regions ==
Bangladesh Scouts currently has 13 regions in total with 4 special regions under different administrations. Talks are underway to create a "Police region" in the near future. Each Special region has its own unique flag and in the case of the Naval and Air regions, they have their own logos.
The regions are listed below:

- Dhaka Region
- Rangpur Region
- Sylhet Region
- Dinajpur Region
- Mymensingh Region
- Barishal Region
- Rajshahi Region
- Chattogram Region
- Cumilla Region

=== Special regions ===
- Rover Region

- Railway Region

- Naval Region

- Air region

== Training center ==
The National Scout Training Center (NSTC) is at Mouchak, Gazipur. It includes a Scout Museum inaugurated in November 2007 on the occasion of one hundredth anniversary of scouting. There are also 10 Regional Scout Training Centers (RSTC) at:

1. Bahadurpur (Rover Scout Training Centre), Gazipur
2. Muktagacha, Mymensingh
3. Kaptai, Rangamati
4. Dosmail, Dinajpur
5. Lokkhonabond, Sylhet
6. Rupatoly, Barisal
7. Lalmai, Comilla
8. Pulerhat, Khulna
9. Nawdapara, Rajshahi
10. Shakharia, Bogra

== National Scout Jamboree ==
Name	Date	Place
1st National Scout Jamboree	21–29 January 1978	National Scout Training Center, Mouchak, Gazipur
2nd National Scout and 5 Apr Jamboree	30 December 1980 – 6 January 1981	National Scout Training Center, Mouchak, Gazipur
3rd National Scout Jamboree	28 December 1985 – 4 January 1986	National Scout Training Center, Mouchak, Gazipur
4th National Scout Jamboree	27 December 1989 – 3 January 1990	National Scout Training Center, Mouchak, Gazipur
5th National Scout and 14 Apr Jamboree	5–12 January 1994	National Scout Training Center, Mouchak, Gazipur
6th National Scout Jamboree	5–11 February 1999	National Scout Training Center, Mouchak, Gazipur
7th National Scout and 4th SAARC Jamboree	5–12 January 2004	National Scout Training Center, Mouchak, Gazipur
8th National Scout Jamboree	14–22 January 2010	National Scout Training Center, Mouchak, Gazipur
9th Bangladesh and 1st SAANSO (South Asian Association of National Scout Organization) Scout Jamboree	2014	National Scout Training Center, Mouchak, Gazipur
10th Bangladesh and 3rd SAANSO (South Asian Association of National Scout Organization) Scout Jamboree	2019	National Scout Training Center, Mouchak, Gazipur
11th National Scout Jamboree and 32nd Asian Scout Jamboree	19-27 January 2023	National Scout Training Center, Mouchak, Gazipur

== National Rover Moot and Community Development Camp (COMDECA) ==
Name	Date	Place
1st Bangladesh National Rover Moot	14 – 18 January 1978	National Scout Training Center, Mouchak, Gazipur
2nd National Rover Moot	22 – 27 October 1978	Bahadurpur, Gazipur
3rd National Rover Moot	13 – 18 April 1980	Shahzahan Nagar K. D. A. Field, Khulna
4th National Rover Moot	21 – 26 January 1985	Bahadurpur, Gazipur
5th National Rover Moot	29 December 1988 – 2 January 1989	National Scout Training Center, Mouchak, Gazipur
6th National Rover Moot	1 – 7 January 1993	Bondor Stadium, Chittagong
1st Bangladesh Community Development Camp (COMDECA)	1994	Banadurpur Rover Polly, Gazipur
2nd Bangladesh and 2nd Asia Pacific Community Development Camp (COMDECA)	18 – 22 December 1995	Ta-Ma-Tu Area, Barguna
7th Bangladesh National and 9th Asia Pacific Rover Moot	24 – 30 October 1997	Lukkatura Golf Club Arena, Sylhet
8th National Rover Moot and 3rd National Community Development Camp (COMDECA)	28 December 2001 – 4 January 2002	Shrijgonj Hyndui Dam near Jamuna River, Shrijgonj
4th National National Community Development Camp (COMDECA)	3 – 7 March 2007	Cox's Bazar Sea Beach, Cox's Bazar
Asia Pacific Region International Sanitary COMDECA	7 – 14 December 2007	Cox's Bazar Sea Beach, Cox's Bazar
9th National Rover Moot	6 – 14 February 2009	Bahadurpur Rover Polly, Gazipur.
10th National Rover Moot and 5th National Community Development Camp (COMDECA)	29 January – 4 February 2013	'Moynamotir Chaar', Debiganj, Panchagar
11th National Rover Moot	26-31 January 2017	Tungipara, Gopalgonj
6th National COMDECA	31 March- 5 April 2018	Haimchor, Chandpur
50th Golden Jublee Rover Moot (Rover Region)	01 - 5 March 2024	Bahadurpur Rover Polly, Gazipur.
7th National COMDECA	19 - 25 February 2025	National Scout Training Center-2, Hard Point, Sirajganj

== See also ==
- Bangladesh Girl Guides Association
- Asia-Pacific Scout Region (World Organization of the Scout Movement)
- World Organization of the Scout Movement
- Robert Baden-Powell, 1st Baron Baden-Powell
- Scouting for Boys
