= Mahmud Hasan Deobandi =

Indian Muslim scholar and activist (1851–1920)

Shaykh al-Hind Mahmud Hasan Deobandi
- محمود
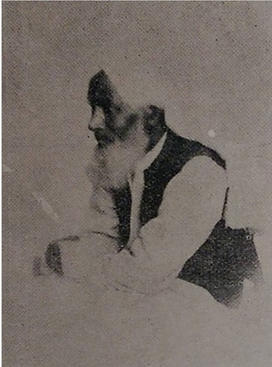

3rd Principal and Sheikh al-Hadith of Darul Uloom Deoband
- In office 1890–1915
- Preceded by: Syed Ahmad Dehlavi
- Succeeded by: Anwar Shah Kashmiri

1st President of Jamiat Ulema-e-Hind
- In office November 1920 – 30 November 1920
- Preceded by: Kifayatullah Dehlawi (as an interim president)
- Succeeded by: Kifayatullah Dehlawi

Personal life
- Born: 1851 Bareilly, North-Western Provinces, British India
- Died: 30 November 1920 (aged 68–69) Delhi, British India
- Resting place: Mazar-e-Qasmi
- Parent: Zulfiqar Ali Deobandi (father)
- Main interest(s): Exegesis, Indian freedom movement
- Notable idea: Silk Letter Movement
- Notable works: Tarjuma Shaykh al-Hind; Adilla-e-Kāmilah; Īzah al-adillah
- Education: Darul Uloom Deoband

Religious life
- Religion: Islam
- Denomination: Sunni
- Founder of: Jamia Millia Islamia
- Jurisprudence: Hanafi
- Tariqa: Chishtiya-Sabiriya-Imdadiya
- Movement: Deobandi

Muslim leader
- Teacher: Mahtab Ali Deobandi Mahmud Deobandi, Muhammad Qasim Nanawtawi
- Disciple of: Imdadullah Muhajir Makki; Rashid Ahmad Gangohi
- Disciples: List of students of Mahmud Hasan Deobandi
- Influenced: His students, Deobandis

Mahmud Hasan Deobandi (also known as Shaykh al-Hind; 1851–1920) was an Indian Muslim scholar and an activist of the Indian Independence Movement, who co-founded the Jamia Millia Islamia University and launched the Silk Letter Movement for the freedom of India. He was the first student to study at the Darul Uloom Deoband seminary. His teachers included Mahtab Ali Deobandi, Muhammad Qasim Nanawtawi and Mahmud Deobandi, and he was authorized in Sufism by Imdadullah Muhajir Makki and Rashid Ahmad Gangohi.

Hasan served as the principal of the Darul Uloom Deoband and founded organisations such as the Jamiatul Ansar and the Nizaratul Maarif. He wrote a translation of the Quran in Urdu and authored books such as Adilla-e-Kāmilah, Īzah al-adillah, Ahsan al-Qirā and Juhd al-Muqill. He taught hadith at the Darul Uloom Deoband and copyedited the Sunan Abu Dawud. His major students included Ashraf Ali Thanwi, Anwar Shah Kashmiri, Hussain Ahmad Madani, Kifayatullah Dehlawi, Sanaullah Amritsari and Ubaidullah Sindhi.

Hasan was a staunch opponent of the British Raj. He launched movements to overthrow their power in India but was arrested in 1916 and imprisoned in Malta. He was released in 1920, and was honoured with the title of "Shaykh al-Hind" (The Leader of India) by the Khilafat committee. He wrote religious edicts in support of the Non-cooperation movement and travelled various parts of India, to enroll Muslims in the freedom movement. He presided the second general meeting of the Jamiat Ulema-e-Hind in November 1920 and was appointed its president. The Shaikh-Ul-Hind Maulana Mahmood Hasan Medical College is named in his memory. In 2013, the Government of India released a commemorative postal stamp on his Silk Letter Movement, also called as Reshmi Rumal Movement.

== Early life ==
Mahmud Hasan was born in 1851 in the town of Bareilly (in modern Uttar Pradesh, India) into the Usmani family of Deoband. His father, Zulfiqar Ali Deobandi, who co-founded the Darul Uloom Deoband, was a professor at the Bareilly College and then served as the deputy inspector of madrasas.

Hasan studied the Quran with Miyanji Manglori, and Persian with Abdul Lateef. During the 1857 rebellion, his father was transferred to Meerut, and Hasan was shifted to Deoband, where he studied Persian and Arabic literature from the Dars-e-Nizami course with his uncle, Mahtab Ali Deobandi. He became the first student at the Darul Uloom Deoband; and studied with Mahmud Deobandi. He completed his formal studies in 1869 and went to Meerut to study the Sihah Sittah with Muhammad Qasim Nanawtawi. He attended the hadith discourses of Nanawtawi for two years, and studied Arabic literature with his father during the vacations. He graduated in 1872 and received the turban of honour in 1873 in the first convocation of the Darul Uloom Deoband. He was an authorized disciple of Imdadullah Muhajir Makki and Rashid Ahmad Gangohi in Sufism.

== Career ==
=== Darul Uloom Deoband ===
Hasan was appointed a teacher at the Darul Uloom Deoband in 1873, the same year he completed his studies. He became its principal in 1890, succeeding Syed Ahmad Dehlavi. He did not consider the Deoband seminary just a place of learning, but an institution established to compensate the loss of 1857 rebellion.

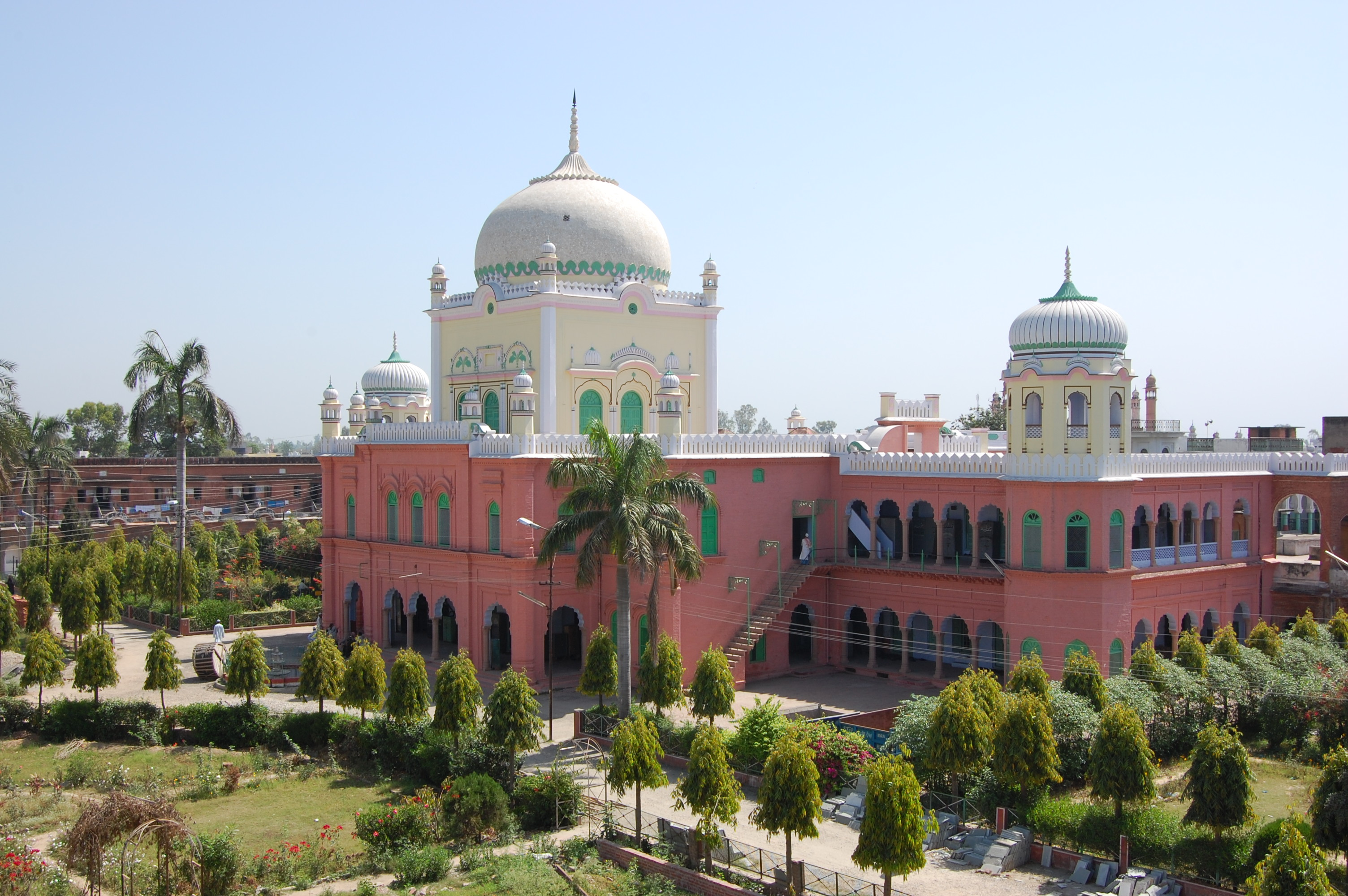
A view of Darul Uloom Deoband

Hasan formed the Thamratut-Tarbiyat (The Fruit of the Upbringing) in 1878. It was established as an intellectual centre to train the students and graduates of the Darul Uloom Deoband. It then took the form of Jamiatul Ansar (Community of Helpers), which started in 1909 with its first session held in Moradabad and presided over by Ahmad Hasan Amrohi. Alongside his student Ubaidullah Sindhi, Hasan then started the Nizaratul Ma'arif al-Qur'ānia (Academy of Quranic Learning) in November 1913. It aimed to increase the influence of Muslim scholars and to instruct and teach English-educated Muslims about Islam. Hussain Ahmad Madani suggests that "the purpose behind establishing Nizaratul Maarif was to make Muslim youth stronger believers, and to instruct and guide them, specially western-educated Muslims, in the Quranic teachings in such a logical way that it would remove the poisonous impact of anti-Islam propaganda and ill-founded skepticism about practicality of Islamic belief and tenets in modern age."

=== Silk Letter Movement ===
Hasan wanted to overthrow the British Raj in India; to achieve this, he focussed on two geographic areas. The first was the area of autonomous tribes that lived between Afghanistan and India. Asir Adrawi states, "this is the historical reality that people who came to invade India used that route, and Hasan's selection of this area for his movement was definitely the highest evidence of his prudence and insight." The second area was within India; he wanted to influence all the sincere leaders who cared for the community to support his cause, and in this he was quite successful. The scholars that worked on the first front included his students and companions such as Abdul Ghaffar Khan, Abdur-Raheem Sindhi, Muhammad Mian Mansoor Ansari, Ubaidullah Sindhi and Uzair Gul Peshawari. They propagated the program of Hasan into the frontier areas and into those of the autonomous tribes. The scholars that worked on the second front included Mukhtar Ahmad Ansari, Abdur-Raheem Raipuri and Ahmadullah Panipati. Muhammad Miyan Deobandi states, "Shaikhul Hind used to watch carefully the nature and capability of his disciples and people who approached him. He selected some persons from amongst them and commanded them to reach Yaghistan and instigate the autonomous tribes to attack India." The program designed to prepare the people inside India for a rebellion if the Afghani and Turkish governments provided military aid to the militia and people within the country rose up for the rebellion during the invasion by this army. Yaghistan was the center of the movement of Mahmud Hasan. The Provisional Government of India was designed by Hasan's pupil Ubaidullah Sindhi and his companions, and Mahendra Pratap was appointed the President.

Hasan himself traveled to Hejaz to secure German and Turkish support in 1915. He left Bombay on 18 September 1915, and was accompanied by scholars including Muhammad Mian Mansoor Ansari, Murtaza Hasan Chandpuri, Muhammad Sahool Bhagalpuri and Uzair Gul Peshawari. On 18 October 1915, he went to Mecca where he had meetings with Ghalib Pasha, the Turkish governor, and Anwar Pasha, who was the defense minister of Turkey. Ghalib Pasha assured him of assistance and gave him three letters, one addressed to the Indian Muslims, the second to the governor Busra Pasha, and the third to Anwar Pasha. Hasan also had a meeting with the Djemal Pasha, the governor of Syria, who concurred with what Ghalib Pasha had said. Hasan feared that if he returned to India, he might be arrested by the British, and asked that he be allowed to reach the Afghanistan border from where he could reach Yaghistan. Djemal made an excuse and told him that if he feared arrest, he could stop at Hejaz or any other Turkish area. Subsequently, the program called the Silk Letter Movement was leaked and its members were arrested. Hasan was arrested in December 1916 alongside his companions and students, Hussain Ahmad Madani and Uzair Gul Peshawari, by Sharif Hussain, the Sharif of Mecca, who revolted against the Turks and allied with the British. The Sharif then handed them over to the British, and they were imprisoned in Fort Verdala in Malta.

=== Khilafat movement ===
Hasan was released in May 1920, and by 8 June 1920 he had reached Bombay. He was welcomed by major scholars and political figures including Abdul Bari Firangi Mahali, Hafiz Muhammad Ahmad, Kifayatullah Dehlawi, Shaukat Ali and Mahatma Gandhi. His release was seen as a huge aid to the Khilafat Movement and he was honoured with the title of "Shaykh al-Hind" (The Leader of India) by the Khilafat Committee.

Hasan inspired the scholars of Deoband seminary to join the Khilafat movement. He issued a religious edict on the boycott of British goods; which was sought by the students of then Muhammadan Anglo-Oriental College. In this edict, he advised the students to avoid supporting the government in any manner, to boycott the government funded schools and colleges, and to avoid government jobs. Following this edict, a majority of students left the college. This edict supported the Non-cooperation movement. Hasan then travelled to Allahabad, Fatehpur, Ghazipur, Faizabad, Lucknow and Moradabad and guided Muslims in support of the movements.

=== Jamia Millia Islamia ===
Hasan was asked to preside over the foundational ceremony of the Jamia Millia Islamia, then known as the National Muslim University. The university was established by Hasan alongside Muhammad Ali Jauhar and Hakim Ajmal Khan, who were motivated by the demands of students of Aligarh Muslim University (AMU) who were disappointed with the AMU's pro-British bias and who wanted a new university. Hasan's servants, however, urged him not to accept the offer as he had grown increasingly weak and pale from his time of incarceration in Malta. Hasan stated, in response to their concerns, "If my president-ship pains the British, then I shall definitely take part in this ceremony." He was subsequently brought to Deoband railway station in a palanquin, from where he traveled to Aligarh.

Hasan was not able to write anything, and asked his student Shabbir Ahmad Usmani to prepare his presidential speech. He then made corrections and improvements to the prepared speech, and sent it to print. On 29 October 1920, this speech was read aloud by Usmani in the foundational ceremony of the university, after which Hasan laid the foundation stone of the Jamia Millia Islamia. Hasan said in the speech that "the knowledgeable people amongst you are well aware that my elders and predecessors never issued an edict of disbelief over learning of a foreign language or acquiring the academic sciences of other nations. Yes, it was said that the final last effect of the English-education is that its seekers either colour themselves in that of the Christianity or they mock their own religion and co-religionists through their atheistic insolence, or they worship the current government; then it is better to remain ignorant instead of seeking such education." He concurred with Mahatma Gandhi's who stated that, "the higher education of these colleges is pure and clean as the milk, but mixed with a little bit of poison" and considered the Muslim National University, as an alembic which would separate this poison from academia.

=== Jamiat Ulema-e-Hind ===
Hasan presided over the second general meeting of the Jamiat Ulema-e-Hind, which was held in November 1920 in Delhi. He was appointed the president of the Jamiat, a position he could not serve due to his death after few days [on 30 November]. The general meeting was held over three days starting from 19 November, and Hasan's presidential speech was read aloud by his student Shabbir Ahmad Usmani. Hasan advocated a Hindu-Muslim-Sikh unity and said that, if Hindus and Muslims unite, acquiring freedom was not much more difficult. This was the last conference that Hasan attended.

== Students ==
Hasan's students number in thousands. His major students include Anwar Shah Kashmiri, Asghar Hussain Deobandi, Ashraf Ali Thanwi, Hussain Ahmad Madani, Izaz Ali Amrohi, Kifayatullah Dihlawi, Manazir Ahsan Gilani, Muhammad Mian Mansoor Ansari, Muhammad Shafi, Sanaullah Amritsari, Shabbir Ahmad Usmani, Syed Fakhruddin Ahmad, Ubaidullah Sindhi and Uzair Gul Peshawari. Ebrahim Moosa states that his "fine cohort of students later gained renown in the madrasa network and made contribution to the public life in South Asia in fields as diverse as religious scholarship, politics, and institution-building."

== Literary works ==
=== The translation of the Quran ===
Hasan wrote an interlinear translation of the Quran in Urdu. He later started to annotate this translation with explanatory notes, as he had just completed the fourth chapter An-Nisa, when he died in 1920. The exegetical work was completed by his student Shabbir Ahmad Usmani, and is published as Tafsir-e-Usmāni. It was later translated into Persian by a group of scholars, patronized by Mohammed Zahir Shah, the last king of Afghanistan.

=== Al-Abwāb wa Al-Tarājim li al-Bukhāri ===
Hasan taught Sahih Bukhari at the Darul Uloom Deoband for a long time and, when he was incarcerated in Malta, he began to write a treatise explaining its chapter-headings. In the hadith studies, the assignation of the chapter-headings in a collection of traditions is seen as a separate science. Hasan started the treatise with fifteen principles on the subject, and then discussed the traditions from the chapter on revelation and incompletely covered the chapter on knowledge. The treatise is entitled al-abwāb wa al-tarājim li al-Bukhāri (transl. An Explanation of the Chapter Headings of Imam Bukhari's Sahih) and spreads over 52 pages.

=== Adilla-e-Kāmilah ===
As the Ahl-i Hadith movement was growing in India they started questioning the authority of Hanafi school of thought. Ahl-i Hadith scholar Muhammad Hussain Batalvi compiled a set of ten questions and announced a challenge with a reward for those who provided an answer, with ten rupees per answer. This was published from Amritsar and sent to Darul Uloom Deoband. The Deoband's policy had been to avoid the issues which divide the Muslim community, but the Ahl-i Hadith people forced the issue. Subsequently, Hasan, at the request of his teacher Nanawtawi, in return asked a series of questions in the form of a treatise, Adilla-e-Kāmilah (transl. The Perfect Argument), promising that, "if you answer these questions, we shall give you twenty rupees per answer."

=== Īzah al-Adillah ===
After Mahmud Hasan's Adilla-e-Kāmilah, an Ahl-i Hadith scholar Ahmad Hasan Amrohwi wrote Misbāh al-Adillah (transl. A Lantern to the Argument) in response to Adilla-e-Kāmilah. The Deobandi scholar waited for a while for any response from the original questioner, Muhammad Hussain Batalwi, who then announced that Amrohwi's work was sufficient, and that he has himself had discarded the idea of writing the answers. Mahmud Hasan, in response, wrote Izāh al-Adillah (transl. Elucidation of the Argument); a commentary on his earlier work Adilla-e-Kāmilah.

=== Ahsan al-Qirā ===
Hasan has discussed the permissibility of Friday prayers in villages and rural areas in this book. Syed Nazeer Husain had raised this issue and published a religious edict which decreed that there is no specification of any place [for the Friday prayers]. He stated that, wherever a least of two people gather, the Friday prayers are necessary. Hanafi jurist and scholar, Rashid Ahmad Gangohi, penned a fatwa over 14 pages in response, called the Awthaq al-'Urā (transl. The Strongest Ring) from the perspective of the Hanafi school of thought.

Gangohi's work received criticism from the Ahl-i Hadith scholars; most of which reproduced the same arguments. Gangohi's pupil Mahmud Hasan felt that the language of these works was insolent, and wrote a lengthy book, entitled Ahsan al-Qirā fī Tawzīḥ Awthaq al-'Urā (transl. The Best Discourse in The Elucidation of The Strongest Ring), in response.

=== Juhd al-Muqill ===
Shah Ismail Dehlvi and his companions who worked for the reformation of Muslims from Bidʻah (religious innovations), received wide criticism from the people who were associated with these innovations. Dehlvi was in particular accused of blasphemy and was excommunicated from Islam. Subsequently, Islamic scholar Ahmad Hasan Kanpuri wrote Tanzih al-Raḥmān (transl. The Glorification of the Merciful), in which he mentioned Dehlvi to be a member of extreme group of the Muʿtazila. Mahmud Hasan, in response, wrote Juhd al-Muqill fī tanzīhi al-Mu'izzi wa al-Mudhill (transl. An Effort of an Insignificant on the Glorification of One who Graces and Disgraces), in two volumes. The book discusses the attributes and qualities of Allah with the terminology of the Ilm al-Kalam, following the accent of Al-Taftazani's commentary Sharah Aqā'id-e-Nasafi, on al-Nasafi's creed. Hasan responded to the allegations made against Shah Ismail Dehlvi and other such scholars, using Ilm al-Kalam.

=== Tas'hīh Abu Dawūd ===
The written manuscripts of the Sihah Sittah were preserved in the libraries of Islamic nations, with the majority held at Mecca and Medina. The Indian scholar Ahmad Ali Saharanpuri copied the manuscripts that existed in Mecca, and then studied them with Shah Muhammad Ishaq. When he returned to India he started publishing the copyedited editions of these hadith manuscripts from his press. His pupil Muhammad Qasim Nanawtawi continued the practice of copyediting the hadith manuscripts until all of the books were published in India.

Later there was a push to copyedit the Sunan Abu Dawud, one among the six major books of the hadith. However, the editions that were published and the original written manuscripts majorly differed from each other. Hasan thus collected all the available manuscripts, copyedited the text and had several editions of it published in book form. These were published in 1900 from the Mujtabai Press in Delhi.

== Death and legacy ==
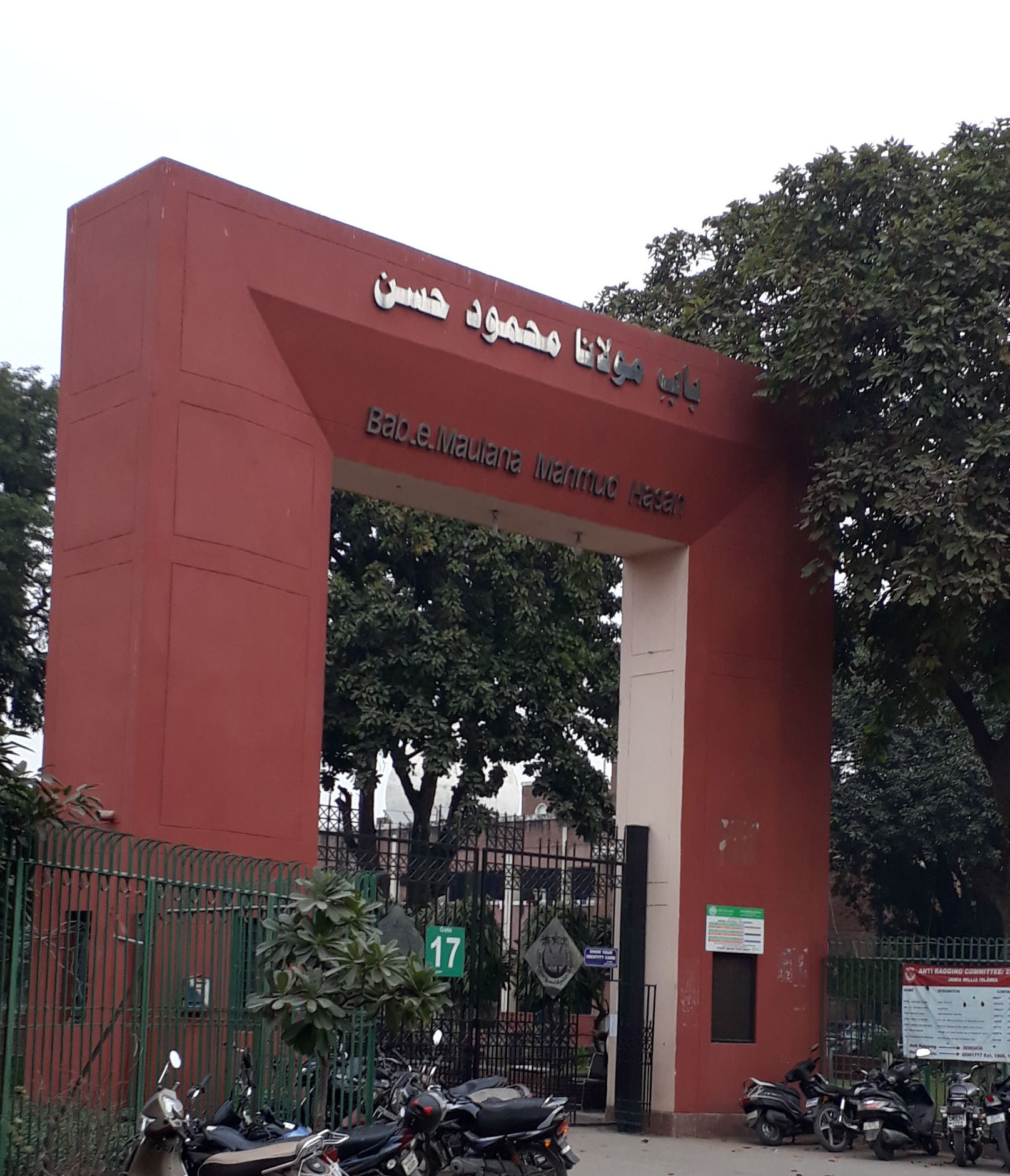
The Maulana Mahmud Hasan gate of Jamia Millia Islamia.

On 30 October 1920, a day after the foundation of the Jamia Millia Islamia in Aligarh, Hasan travelled to Delhi at the request of Mukhtar Ahmad Ansari. Several days later his health deteriorated and he received treatment from Ansari at his home in Daryaganj. He died on 30 November 1920 in Delhi. As the news of his death was announced, Hindus and Muslims closed their shops and gathered outside Ansari's house to pay tributes to Hasan. Ansari then asked Hasan's brother Hakeem Muhammad Hasan if he preferred Mahmud Hasan to be buried in Delhi with arrangements to be made at the Mehdiyan cemetery, or if preferred to bury him at Deoband with arrangements made for moving the body. It was decided to bury him at Deoband because of his wish that he be buried near the grave of his teacher Muhammad Qasim Nanawtawi. His funeral prayers were offered multiple times. The people of Delhi offered the prayers outside Ansari's house, and then the body was moved to Deoband. As they reached the Delhi railway station, a plethora of people gathered and offered funeral prayers. Subsequently, prayers were offered at the Meerut City railway station and Meerut Cantt railway station. His fifth and last funeral prayer was led by his brother Hakeem Muhammad Hasan, and he was buried in the Qasmi cemetery.

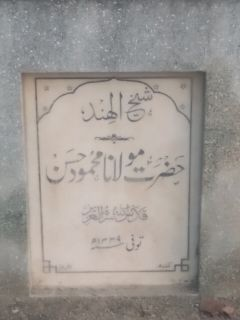
Inscription on Mahmood Hasan Deobandi's grave in the Qasmi Cemetery in Deoband

Mahmud Hasan has had a number of honours. Ashraf Ali Thanwi called him "Shaykh al'-'Ālam" (The Leader of the World). Thanwi states that, "In our opinion, he is the Leader of India, Sindh, the Arab and the Ajam". A medical college in Saharanpur was named Shaikh-Ul-Hind Maulana Mahmood Hasan Medical College after him. In January 2013, the President of India, Pranab Mukherjee released a commemorative postal stamp on Hasan's Silk Letter Movement.

Shaikhul Hind Academy, a department of Darul Uloom Deoband, is named in his memory.

The Shaykh al-Hind Program, an immersion-level Islamic Studies program taught at Darul Qasim College in Glendale Heights, Illinois, is also named in his honor.
