= Niaz Mohammad Khan =

- نیاز محمد خان
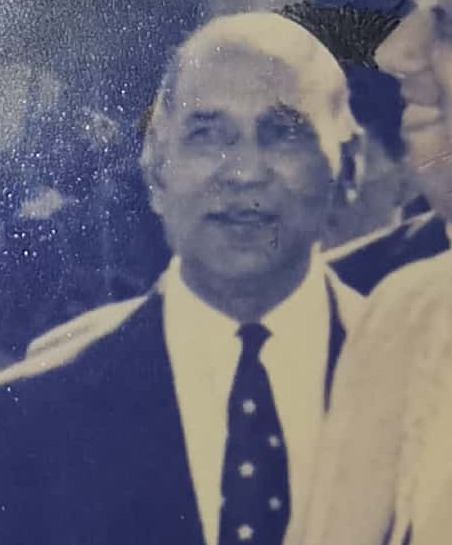

Chief Commissioner of the Pakistan Boy Scouts Association

Niaz M. Khan (Urdu: نیاز محمد خان) (7 June 1907 – 21 April 1972) served as the Chief Commissioner of the Pakistan Boy Scouts Association, and served on the World Scout Committee of the World Organization of the Scout Movement from 1963 to 1969.

In 1969, he was awarded the 55th Bronze Wolf, the only distinction of the World Organization of the Scout Movement, awarded by the World Scout Committee for exceptional services to world Scouting.

== Biography ==
He was born on 7 June 1907 in a village near Batala called Dalelpur. He was a gold medalist in law from the Punjab University. He competed successfully in Audits and Accounts as well as the Indian Civil Service examinations.

He was appointed Assistant Accountant General in 1930. He resigned in July to proceed to Cambridge University for his probationary training. He returned from England in 1932 having topped the list of all the candidates of his batch.

He was posted in Bengal where he served in various capacities, including District Magistrate and Collector Midnapore in 1942. He was the Director of Agriculture from 1945 to 1946. As such he established an agricultural college and farm at Dacca.

For two sessions he was an official member of the Indian Central Assembly in 1938. He was the only member of the steering committee on behalf of East Pakistan in the Bengal partition council. As Commissioner Chittagong in 1950, he established a stadium and a park which is still known by his name. He served as Chief Secretary of East Pakistan in 1952.

He came over to Karachi as Secretary of Industries in 1954. He was appointed Chief Commissioner of Karachi and President of B.C.C.P. (Board of Control of Cricket in Pakistan) in 1956. He served as Secretary Home Kashmir Affairs. He was Chief Scouts Commissioner.

He retired from service in 1966. He was awarded the Qaiser-I-Hind award by the Viceroy in 1935. He was awarded the Bronze Wolf award, the highest scout award. He was the first Asian to receive it. He was widely travelled and represented Pakistan on different international bodies. He was associated with various social welfare organizations. He was chief organizer of an exhibition of A.R. Chughtai in London and presented his paintings to the Emperor of Japan and Willy Brandt, the Chancellor of West Germany. As a student he conducted an inquiry into the economic conditions of a village which was later published as a book by the Board of Economic Inquiry in Lahore. He wrote a book "Let Punjab Speak". He also wrote a biography of Hussain Shaheed Suhrawardy, but could not have it published in his lifetime. He organized a Punjabi Adbi League after retirement and arranged for the translation of the Quran in Punjabi. He died in Lahore on 21 April 1972.
