= Joseph Héliodore Garcin de Tassy =

French orientalist (1794–1878)

Joseph Héliodore Sagesse Vertu Garcin de Tassy (25 January 1794, Marseille – 2 September 1878) was a French orientalist.

== Life ==
Garcin de Tassy was born in 1794 in Marseille to a family of merchants. He started learning Arabic at the age of 20 after meeting his father's business partners from Egypt.

He left for Paris in 1817 where he studied oriental languages under Silvestre de Sacy and was awarded professorship for Indology at the School for Living Oriental Languages, that was founded for him. In 1838 he was elected to the Académie des Inscriptions et Belles-Lettres. and was one of the founders and later president of the Société Asiatique.

Garcin first received prominence through general works on Islam and translations from the Arabic, namely L'Islamisme d'aprés le Coran (3. Ed., Par. 1874), La poésie philosophique et religieuse chez les Persans (4. Ed. 1864, 3 Vols.) and the Allégories, récits poétiques etc. (2. Ed. 1877). Later, he devoted himself to the study of the Hindustani language, where he was reputed as Europe's first capacity. His major works in this area are; Mémoires sur les particularités de la religion musulmane dans l'Inde (1832); Les aventures de Kamrup (translation, 1834); translations of works by the poet Wali (1834); the Histoire de la littérature hindoue e hindoustani (2. Ed. 1871, 3 Vols.); Rudiments de la langue hindouie (1847); Rhétorique et prosodie des langues de l'Orient musulman (1848, 2. Ed. 1873); Chrestomathie hindie et hindouie (1849); La doctrine de l'amour (translation from Hindi, 1859); Cours d'hindoustani (1870) and La langue et la littérature hindoustanies 1850-69 (2. Ed. 1874), to which he added since 1870 a yearly revue under the same title.

== Publications ==
- Les Oiseaux et les Fleurs, allégories morales d'Azz-eddin Elmocaddessi, publiées en arabe avec une traduction et des notes (1821)
- Exposition de la foi musulmane, traduite du turc de Mohammed ben Pir-Ali Elberkevi, avec des notes, par M. Garcin de Tassy, suivie du Pend-Nameh, poème de Saadi, traduit du persan par le même, et du Borda, poème à la louange de Mahomet, traduit de l'arabe (1822; 1828).
- Doctrine et devoirs de la religion musulmane, tirés textuellement du Coran, suivis de l'Eucologe musulman, traduit de l'arabe (1826).
- Conseils aux mauvais poètes, poème de Mir Taki, traduit de l'hindoustani (1826).
- Rudimens de la langue hindoustanie (1829; 1847). Réédition : Rudiments de la langue hindoustanie, 2^{e} édition, adaptée aux dialectes urdu et dakhni, Duprat, Paris, 1863.
- Mémoire sur les particularités de la religion musulmane dans l'Inde, d'après les ouvrages hindoustani (1831; 1869).
- Les Aventures de Kamrup, par Tahcin-Uddin, traduites de l'hindoustani (1834).
- Appendice aux Rudimens de la langue hindoustani, contenant, outre quelques additions à la grammaire, des lettres hindoustani originales, accompagnées d'une traduction et de fac-simile (1833).
- Les Œuvres de Walî, publiées en hindoustani (2 volumes, 1834–36).
- Manuel de l'auditeur du cours d'hindoustani, ou Thèmes gradués, accompagnés d'un vocabulaire français-hindoustani (1836)
- Histoire de la littérature hindoui et hindoustani (2 volumes, 1839–47).
- La Rhétorique des nations musulmanes d'après le traité persan intitulé : Hadayik Ul-Balagat (1844–48). Réédition (2^{e} édition revue et augmentée) : Maisonneuve, Paris, 1873.
- Les Séances de Haidari, récits historiques et élégiaques sur la vie et la mort des principaux martyrs musulmans, ouvrage traduit de l'hindoustani par M. l'abbé Bertrand, Suivi de l'Élégie de Miskin, traduite de la même langue par M. Garcin de Tassy (1845).
- Prosodie des langues de l'Orient musulman, spécialement de l'arabe, du persan, du turc et de l'hindustani (1848).
- Chrestomathie hindie et hindouie à l'usage des élèves de l'École spéciale des langues orientales vivantes (1849).
- Analyse d'un monologue dramatique indien (1850).
- Tableau du Kali yug ou de l'Âge de fer, par Wischnu-Dâs (1854; 1880).
- Mémoire sur les noms propres et les titres musulmans (1854). Réédition : Mémoire sur les noms propres et les titres musulmans, 2^{e} édition, suivie d'une notice sur des vêtements avec inscriptions arabes, persanes et hindoustanies (1878).
- Les Femmes poètes dans l'Inde (1854).
- Chants populaires de l'Inde (1854).
- Les Auteurs hindoustanis et leurs ouvrages (1855; 1868). Réédition : Les Auteurs hindoustanis et leurs ouvrages d'après les biographies originales, Ernest Thorin, Paris, 1968.
- La Poésie philosophique et religieuse chez les Persans. Le Langage des oiseaux (1856; 1860; 1864)
- Mantic Uttaïr, ou le Langage des oiseaux, poème de philosophie religieuse, par Farid-Uddin Attar, publié en persan (1857; 1863). Réédition : La Conférence des oiseaux. Farîd Uddîn Attâr. Traduit du persan par Garcin de Tassy, Albin Michel, Paris, 1996.
- La Doctrine de l'amour, ou Taj-Ulmuluk et Bakawali, roman de philosophie religieuse, par Nihal Chand de Dehli, traduit de l'hindoustani (1858).
- Le Bostan, poëme moral de Saadi, analyse et extraits (1859).
- Description des monuments de Delhi en 1852 d'après le texte hindoustani de Saïyid Ahmad Khan (1863).
- Un Chapitre de l'histoire de l'Inde musulmane, ou Chronique de Scher Schah, sultan de Delhi (1865).
- Histoire de la littérature hindouie et hindoustanie (3 volumes, 1870–71).
- La Langue et la littérature Hindoustanes en 1871 (1872).
- Science des religions. L'Islamisme, d'après le Coran, l'enseignement doctrinal et la pratique (1874).
- La Langue et la Littérature hindoustanies en 1876 (1876)
- Allégories, récits poétiques et chants populaires, traduits de l'arabe, du persan, de l'hindoustani et du turc (1876).
- La Langue et la littérature Hindoustanes en 1870, A. Labitte et Maisonneuve et Cie, Paris, 1971.
- Bag o bahar, le Jardin et le printemps, poème hindoustani (1878). Réédition : Institut national des langues et civilisations orientales, Paris, 1973.
- Saadi, auteur des premières poésies hindoustani, Journal asiatique 1843, réédition en 2006 in La Danse de l'âme, recueil d'odes mystiques et de quatrains des soufis, collection « D'Orient et d'Occident », éditions InTexte.

Translations

- Farid Ud-Din Attar. The Conference of the Birds (Mantiq Ut-Tair). Rendered into English from the literal and complete French translation of Garcin de Tassy by C. S. Nott, The Janus Press, Londres, 1954.
- Muslim Festivals in India and Other Essays. Translated and edited by M. Waseem, Oxford University Press, Delhi, 1995.
