= Asghar Hussain Deobandi =

Indian Sunni Islamic scholar (1877-1945)

Mawlana Mian Sayyid Asghar Hussain Deobandi

Personal life
- Born: 16 October 1877 Deoband, Saharanpur District, North-Western Provinces, British India
- Died: 8 January 1945 (aged 67) Surat, Bombay Presidency, British India
- Resting place: Rander, Surat, Gujarat
- Region: Indian subcontinent

Religious life
- Religion: Islam
- Denomination: Sunni
- Jurisprudence: Hanafi
- Movement: Deobandi

Muslim leader
- Disciple of: Haaji Imdadullah Muhajir Makki, Miyanji Munne Shah
- Students: Badre Alam Merathi, Sharif Hasan Deobandi
- Influenced: Muhammad Shafi, Manazir Ahsan Gilani

Asghar Hussain Deobandi (also known as Mian Sayyid Asghar Hussain) (16 October 1877 — 8 January 1945) was a Sunni Muslim scholar from the Indian subcontinent who co-founded Madrasatul Islah.

Born on 16 October 1877 in a Deoband-based family, claiming descent to Abdul Qadir Jeelani, Asghar Hussain Deobandi was an alumnus of Darul Uloom Deoband, where he studied with Mahmud Hasan Deobandi, Azizur Rahman Usmani and Hafiz Muhammad Ahmad. Hussain was a disciple of Imdadullah Muhajir Makki in the Chishti Sufi order. He taught religious sciences at Atala Masjid, Jaunpur and at his alma mater, Darul Uloom Deoband. He co-edited Al-Qasim, a monthly journal published by Darul Uloom Deoband. Hussain died on 8 January 1945 in Surat, and was buried in Rander. His students include Manazir Ahsan Gilani and Muhammad Shafi.

== Family background ==
Mian Asghar Hussain's ancestors came to India from Baghdad and are descended from Abdul Qadir Jeelani. During the era of Shah Jahan, Sayyid Ghulam Rasool had moved to India along with his family. He was entrusted the imamat and khitabat at the Shahi Masjid of Deoband. He had two sons, Ghulam Nabi and Ghulam Ali. Both brothers married daughters of Shah Ameerullah.

Sayyid Ghulam Ali had three daughters and two sons. The elder son Alam Meer was the grandfather of Mian Asghar Hussain. Alam Meer married Azeemun Nisa, the daughter of Shah Hafeezullah. They had a daughter Wajeeh-un-Nisa and son Muhammad Hasan, who was the father of Mian Asghar Hussain. Muhammad Hasan married twice, first to Maryam-un-Nisa, who whom he had a son, Sayyid Khursheed, and a daughter Masum-un-Nisa. After Maryam-un-Nisa's death, Muhammad Hasan married her sister Naseeb-un-Nisa; (Note: Maryam-un-Nisa and Naseeb-un-Nisa were daughters of Sayyid Mansab Ali) they had a son, Asghar Hussain.

== Birth and education ==
=== Birth ===
Mian Asghar Hussain was born on 16 October 1877 in Deoband to Sayyid Muhammad Hasan and Naseebun Nisa bint Sayyid Mansub Ali.

=== Name and lineage ===
His ism (given name) was Asghar Hussain. His nasab (patronymic) is: Sayyid Asghar Hussain ibn Sayyid Shah Muhammad Hasan ibn Sayyid Shah Alam Meer ibn Sayyid Ghulam Ali ibn Sayyid Ghulam Rasool Baghdadi ibn Sayyid Shah Faqeerullah Baghdadi ibn Sayyid A’zam Saani ibn Sayyid Nazar Muhammad ibn Sayyid Sultan Muhammad ibn Sayyid A’zam Muhammad ibn Sayyid Abu Muhammad ibn Sayyid Qutbuddin ibn Sayyid Baha’uddeen ibn Sayyid Jamalauddin ibn Sayyid Qutbuddin ibn Sayyid Dawud ibn Muhi’uddin Abu Abdullah ibn Sayyid Abu Saleh Nasr ibn Sayyid Abdur Razzaq ibn Abdul Qadir Jilani.

=== Education ===
Aged eight, he began studying with Muhammad Abdullah, alias Miyanji Munne Shah (Note: Miyanji Munne Shah is brother of Azeemun Nisa, the wife of Syed Alam Meer, so he comes to be maternal uncle of Asghar Hussain's father Sayyid Muhammad Hasan and Sayyid Muhammad Hasan is his nephew. At the request of Muhammad Qasim Nanautawi, he had laid the first stone of the new building of Darul Uloom Deoband. He was then preceded by Sayyid Muhammad Abid, and then Rasheed Ahmad Gangohi. Finally all of them laid down stones along with Muhammad Qasim Nanautawi.) and studied Quran from his father and then started to study Persian from him. Later he was enrolled in Darul Uloom Deoband. He continued with the Persian class and studied Persian from Muhammad Yaseen, the father of Muhammad Shafi. He studied mathematics from Manzoor Ahmad. He passed the class of Persian with first position and soon received Muwatta Imam Malik as an honorary gift. As Asghar Hussain turned 17 or 18 and reached the Arabic classes in Darul Uloom Deoband, his father died on 20 September 1894. He discontinued his studies for almost one year and started to teach in his ancestral madrasa.

At the request of Mahmud Hasan Deobandi, Asghar Hussain entered the Darul Uloom Deoband again on 1 April 1896 and continued with Arabic classes. He studied Sahih al-Bukhari, Sahih Muslim, Jami` at-Tirmidhi and Sunan Abu Dawood with Mahmud Hasan Deobandi. His other teachers included Azizur Rahman Usmani and Ghulam Rasool Baghwi. He graduated in 1320 AH and was awarded his certificate from Mahmud Hasan Deobandi and Hafiz Muhammad Ahmad.

He was an authorized disciple of Imdadullah Muhajir Makki in the Chishti branch of Tasawwuf.

== Career ==
After graduating from the Darul Uloom Deoband, he worked in the office department of the Darul Uloom for more than one year. Then his teachers Mahmud Hasan Deobandi and Hafiz Muhammad Ahmad sent him to the madrassa of the Atala Masjid, Jaunpur for the post of head-teacher and he served there for seven years. In the meantime in 1327 AH, he laid the foundation stone of Madrasatul Islah in Sarai Meer, Azamgarh in 1908. He was called to Darul Uloom Deoband and was entrusted with co-editorship of the journal Al-Qasim of the Darul Uloom, while the editor was Maulana Habeebur Rahman. He was entrusted the teaching of Sunan Abu Dawud in Darul Uloom Deoband and he also taught the books of tafsir and fiqh like Jalalayn and Durr-e-Mukhtar. His notable students include Muhammad Shafi, Manazir Ahsan Gilani. and Mufti Naseem Ahmad Fareedi. He restarted his ancestral madrasa which had been closed since the death of his father. The madrasa came later under the care of his son Sayyid Bilal Hussain Mian (d. 9 February 1990) and is now known as Madrassa Asgharia Qadeem whilst its historical name is Darul Musafireen, Madrasa Taleemul Quran.

== Literary works ==
Asghar Hussain has written about thirty books in the Urdu language, including:

- Fatawa Muhammadi
- al-Jawab al-Matin bi-Ahadith Sayyid al-Mursaleen
- Miras al-Muslimin
- Mufeed-ul-Wariseen
- Hayat-e-Khizer
- al-Qawl al-Matin fi al-Iqamati wa at-Taziin
- Gulzar-e-Sunnat
- Molvi Ma'anwi (biography of Rumi)
- Hayat-e-Shaykhul Hind (biography of Mahmud Hasan Deobandi)
- Kulliyat Shaykhul Hind
- Irshadun Nabi
- Chehel Hadith
- Nqabil Itibar Riwayat

== Marriage and family life ==
During his student days at Darul Uloom Deoband, Hussain married the daughter of Mushtaq Hussain. They had two sons, Sayyid Akhtar Hussain and Mian Bilal Hussain, and one daughter, Fehmeeda. Fehmeeda died eight years after her marriage, and was survived by her son Syed Farhat Hussain who had been associated with Hamdard Dawakhana in Karachi. Hussain's son Sayyid Akhtar Hussain was a teacher of hadith at Darul Uloom Deoband, and served in the seminary's administration. Hussain's another son Sayyid Bilal Hussain is survived by three sons, Sayyid Jameel Hussain, Sayyid Khaleel Hussain, and Sayyid Jaleel Hussain; and two daughters, Sajida Khatun and Aabida Khatun.

== Death ==
Mian Asghar Hussain died of cardiac arrest on 8 January 1945 (22 Muharram 1364 AH). He is buried in Rander, Surat.

== See also ==
- List of students of Mahmud Hasan Deobandi
- List of Deobandis

== Bibliography ==
- Hussayn, Sayyid Jameel. Tadhkirah Hadhrat Miyan Saheb [Biography of Miyan Saheb] (in Urdu). Deoband: Madrasa Islamia Asgharia.
