= Murtaza Hasan Chandpuri =

Indian Islamic Scholar

Ibn Sher-e-Khuda Murtaza Hasan Chandpuri

Personal life
- Born: 1868
- Died: 31 December 1951 (aged 83) Chandpur, Bijnor, Uttar Pradesh, India
- Education: Darul Uloom Deoband

Religious life
- Religion: Islam

Muslim leader
- Teacher: Yaqub Nanautawi, Syed Ahmad Dehlavi
- Disciple of: Ashraf Ali Thanwi

Murtaza Hasan Chandpuri (1868-1951) was an Indian Sunni Islamic scholar. He was a disciple of Ashraf Ali Thanwi in the Chishti order of Sufism.

== Biography ==
Murtaza Hasan Chandpuri was a student of Syed Ahmad Dehlavi and Muhammad Yaqub Nanautawi. He graduated from the Darul Uloom Deoband in 1304 AH. He was concerned with Shah Rafi'uddin for his Sufism and later turned to Ashraf Ali Thanwi and became his disciple.

Chandpuri served as principal for a long time in the Islamic schools of Darbhanga and Moradabad but later joined Darul Uloom Deoband. He served the administration of the educational branch first and later he was entrusted with the administration of the Department of Preaching. He retired from the Deoband seminary on 1 Ramadan 1350 AH, and moved to his native place Chandpur, Bijnor, where he died on 31 December 1951 coinciding Islamic month Rabi' al-Thani 1371 AH. He was survived by his son Muhammad Anwar.

Chandpuri debated with Ahmadis and Barelwis. His students include Sulaiman Nadvi, who co-authored Sirat-un-Nabi and established the Shibli Academy.

== Literary works ==
Chandpuri mainly wrote articles and leaflets in refutation of the accusations and allegations which Ahmed Raza Khan Barelvi had leveled against the scholars of the Deoband, especially Muhammad Qasim Nanautavi, Rashid Ahmad Gangohi, Khalil Ahmad Saharanpuri and Ashraf Ali Thanwi. Most of his articles have been compiled and published under the name Majmua' Rasa'il-e-Chandpuri. Nizamuddin Asir Adrawi has mentioned the following works under his name:

- Mirza'iyat Ka Khatma
- Qadiyaniyat Mai Qiyamat Khez Bhonchaal
- Mirza Aur Mirzaiyon Ko Darbar-e-Nabuwwat Se Challenge
- Mirzaiyon Ki Tamam Jamaton Ko Challenge
- Tehqeeq-ul-Kufr
- Taleem al-Khabir fi Hadith Ibn Kathir
- Qadiyaniyon Se 70 Sawalat
- Saa'iqa Aasmani bar Firqa Qadyani

== See also ==
- List of Deobandis

== Sources ==
- Rahmāni, Atā-ur-Rahmān. "Ra'īs al-Munāzirīn Mawlāna Sayyid Murtaza Hasan Chāndpuri". In Bukhāri, Akbar Shah (ed.). Bīs Ulama-e-Haq (in Urdu). Lahore: Maktabah Rahmaniyah. pp. 94–97.
- Jāmpuri, Akbar Shah. "Sayyid Murtaza Hasan Chāndpuri". In Bukhāri, Akbar Shah (ed.). Bīs Ulama-e-Haq (in Urdu). Lahore: Maktabah Rahmaniyah. pp. 98–101.
