= Shaikh-Ul-Hind Maulana Mahmood Hasan Medical College =

Medical college in Uttar Pradesh, India

- Other names: Government Allopathic Medical College, Saharanpur
- Type: State medical college
- Established: 2015; 11 years ago
- Affiliations: Atal Bihari Vajpayee Medical University, NMC
- Principal: Dr. Sanjeeta Aneja
- Students: 509
- Undergraduates: 100
- Postgraduates: MD - 9
- Location: Saharanpur, Uttar Pradesh, India; 29.9919°N 77.4774°E
- Website: smmhmedicalcollege.com

Government Medical College or Shaikh-Ul-Hind Maulana Mahmood Hasan Medical College or S.M.M.H. Medical College is a state medical college located in Saharanpur. It was inspected by NMC and given letter of permission for admission of first foundation batch in 2015.

== Courses ==
Since 2015, 100 students were allowed to take admission in the M.B.B.S. Admission will be by single competitive examination. The NEET-UG accounts for both the filling of 15% all India quota seats and remaining 85% state quota seats.
