= Sadruddin Khan Azurda Dehlawi =

Sadruddin Khan Azurda Dehlawi (1804–1868) was an Islamic scholar, leader of the Indian Rebellion of 1857 and poet during British era. He was Grand Mufti Delhi and worked for the rebellion against British government.

== Career ==
Dehlawi received education from Shah Abdul Aziz, an authority on ahadith in Delhi, and from scholar Fazle Imam Farooqi Khairabadi. Sadruddin Azurda was an examiner of Arabic at the Anglo-Oriental College and was also a disciple of both the Madrassahs Khairabadi and the Madrassah Rahimiyyah. He was authorities on Ilm al-Hadith and Ilm al-Fiqh during 19th century.

He was the Sadr Amin of Delhi from 1827 to 1846 and Sadrus Sudoor also known as Grand Mufti of Delhi from 1846 to 1857. The houses of Sadruddin Azurda was the meeting places of rebel leaders, scholars, poets, and literary figures.

Thirty scholars at Delhi, including Rahmatullah Kairnawi, Sadruddin Khan Azurda, Sarfraz Ali, and Fazle Haq Khairabadi signed the declaration stating the uprising of 1857 was a jihad. Due to his position among the scholars he influenced number of scholars and among them prominent fighter of mutiny was Maulana Ahmadullah Shah Madrasi. Madarasi was one of the main leader of Indian rebel movement who launched revolts in all of the Awadh region

He mediated between the English and Mughal elites and held consultations with Bahadur Shah Zafar during the rebellion to strengthen the mutiny and reconciled the jihadis, the court and the sepoys to avoid a possible civil war between Indian fighters.

He was tried in court of Law due to his involvement in 1857 rebellion and his property was confiscated. Mufti Sadruddin 'Azurda', himself a poet, was known to be an acquaintance and admirer of Ghalib.

Syed Ahmed Khan considered him accomplished Scholar. Hakim Abdul Hai Rae Barelwi considered him as the pride of India who had no match in scholarly accomplishments and excellence.

== Students ==
Dehlawi taught in the madrasa Darul Baqa at Shahjahani Masjid Red Fort.

His students include:

- Khairuddin Dehlavi (Abul Kalam Azad's father)
- Mohammad Hadi Dehalvi
- Sa'dullah Moradabadi,
- Faizul Hasan Saharanpuri,
- Yusuf Ali Khan (the Nawab of Rampur),
- Nawab Ziauddin Khan Nayyar,
- Nawab Mustafa Khan Shaifta,
- Sami'ullah Dehlavi,
- Faqeer Mohammad Jahlami
- Rashid Ahmed Gangohi
- Qasim Nanawtawi

== Poet ==
As a poet Dehlawi used the pen name Azurda in literary circles.

== Death ==
He died in 1868.
