= Pakistan Girl Guides Association =

National Guiding organization of Pakistan

- Headquarters: Islamabad
- Country: Pakistan
- Founded: 1911
- Membership: 117,692 (2010)
- Affiliation: World Association of Girl Guides and Girl Scouts
- Website http://www.pgga.org.pk

Junior Guide	Guide

The Pakistan Girl Guides Association (PGGA) (Urdu: پاکستان گرل گائڈزایسوسی ایشن) is the national Guiding organization of Pakistan. It serves 117,692 members (as of 2010). Founded in 1911 as part of Indian Girl Guiding, the girls-only organization became independent in 1947 and a full member of the World Association of Girl Guides and Girl Scouts in 1948.

== Mission ==
“To provide opportunities for the development of girls and young women, so that they become confident, patriotic and law-abiding citizens capable of performing their duties in the home, as well as community and country”

Vision: We are a National Movement of empowered girls and young women working as the agents of change to build a better world.

== Program and ideals ==
The movement aims to help girls develop potentials as individuals and prepare them into useful and caring citizens of the country. The association is divided in three sections according to age:

- Junior Guides - 6 to 11 Years
- Girl Guides - 11 to 16 Years
- Senior Guides - 16 to 21 Years

=== Guide Promise ===
I promise to do my best,
to do my duty to Allah Taala and Pakistan,
to serve mankind and participate in nation building activities,
to obey the Guide Laws.

=== Guide Law ===
1. A guide is trustworthy
2. A guide is loyal
3. A guide is friendly and a sister to all other Guides.
4. A guide is polite and considerate and develops a sense of civic responsibility.
5. A guide is a polite and considerate
6. A guide is kind to animals and respects all living things.
7. A guide is obedient.
8. A guide is helpful and makes good use of her time.
9. A guide is courageous and cheerful in difficult times.
10. A guide is thrifty and takes care of her own and other people's possessions.
11. A guide's deeds follow her words.

== See also ==
- Pakistan Boy Scouts Association
- Afghanistan Scout Association
