= Pakistan Historical Society =

Historical society in Pakistan

Pakistan Historical Society (PHS)
- Formation: 1950; 76 years ago
- Type: Historical society
- Website: phs.com.pk pakistanhistoricalsociety.com

The Pakistan Historical Society (PHS) is a democratically organised organisation founded in 1950. The Society promotes historical research through the publication of research monographs, the compilation and publication of original sources, and their authoritative translations. Its officials and members of the executive committee are elected for a term of three years. From 1953, the society began publishing a quarterly research journal, now known as Historicus.

== Journal of Pakistan Historical Society - "Historicus" ==
The Journal of the Pakistan Historical Society (Historics) is a quarterly research journal of international repute, published by the PHS since 1953 without interruption. It had published its 68th volume, No.1: January - March 2020, No. 2: April - June 2020, No.3: July - September 2020, No. 4: October - December 2020. They are continue to Publish without any break.
