= Silk Letter Movement =

1913–1920 Indian movement for independence

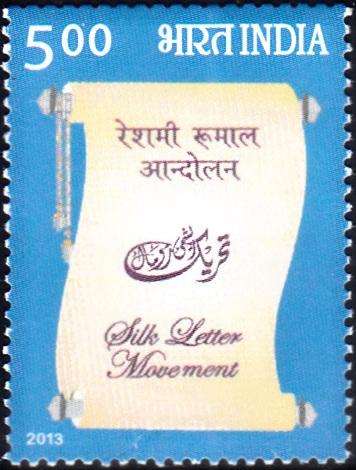
Stamp from 2013 commemorating the Movement.

The Silk Letter Movement ('Tehreek-e-Reshmi Rumal') was organised by Deobandi leaders between 1913 and 1920, aimed at gaining Indian independence from British rule by forming an alliance with the Ottoman Empire, the Emirate of Afghanistan and the German Empire. This plot was uncovered by the Punjab CID with the capture of letters from Ubaidullah Sindhi, one of the Deobandi leaders then in Afghanistan, to Mahmud Hasan Deobandi, another leader then in Hejaz. The letters were written on silk cloth, hence the name.

== Overview ==
Muhammad Mian Mansoor Ansari went to Hejaz with Mahmood Hasan in September 1915. He returned to India in April 1916 with Ghalib Nama (Silk Letter) which he showed to freedom fighters in India and the autonomous areas, and then took to Kabul where he arrived in June 1916.

With the onset of World War I, Ubaidullah Sindhi and Mehmud Hasan (principal of the Darul Uloom Deoband) had travelled to Kabul and Hejaz, respectively, in October 1915 with plans to initiate a Muslim insurrection in the tribal belt of India. For this purpose, Ubaidullah was to propose that the Amir of Afghanistan declare war on Britain, while Mahmud Al Hasan sought German and Turkish help. Hasan proceeded to the Hejaz Vilayet. Ubaid Allah, in the meantime, was able to establish friendly relations with Amir. As the plans unfolded in what came to be called the Silk Letter Movement, Ubaidullah was able to establish friendly relations with Amir. At Kabul, Ubaidullah, along with some students who had preceded him to Turkey to join the Caliph's Jihad against Britain, decided that the pan-Islamic cause would be best served by focusing on the Indian Freedom Movement.

The Berlin-Indian Committee (which became the Indian Independence Committee after 1915) also produced an Indo-German-Turkish mission to the Indo-Iranian border, with the purpose of encouraging the local tribes to attack British interests. This group met the Deobandis in Kabul in December 1915. The mission, along with bringing members of the Indian movement right to India's border, also brought messages from the Kaiser, Enver Pasha and Abbas Hilmi, the displaced Khedive of Egypt, expressing support for Pratap's mission and inviting the Amir to move against British India

The mission's immediate aim was to rally the Amir against British India and to obtain from the Afghan Government a right of free passage. But after the leakage of the plan, the top Deobandi leaders were arrested – Mehmud Hasan was arrested in Makkah and together with Husayn Ahmad, was exiled to Malta, later being released on account of advanced T.B.

== Prison of Malta ==
Maulana Hakim Syed Nusrat Hussain, a freedom fighter, was arrested in 1917 by the British along with Sheikh-ul-Hind Mahmood Hasan Deobandi during the Silk Letter Movement and imprisoned in Malta Jail. He was the only one among the group who died in prison, earning him the title, "Shaheed-e-Malta". The remaining companions—Maulana Hussain Ahmad Madani, Maulana Waheed Ahmad Madani, and Maulana Uzair Gul Peshawari—were known as "Aseerān-e-Malta" (Prisoners of Malta).

== Legacy ==
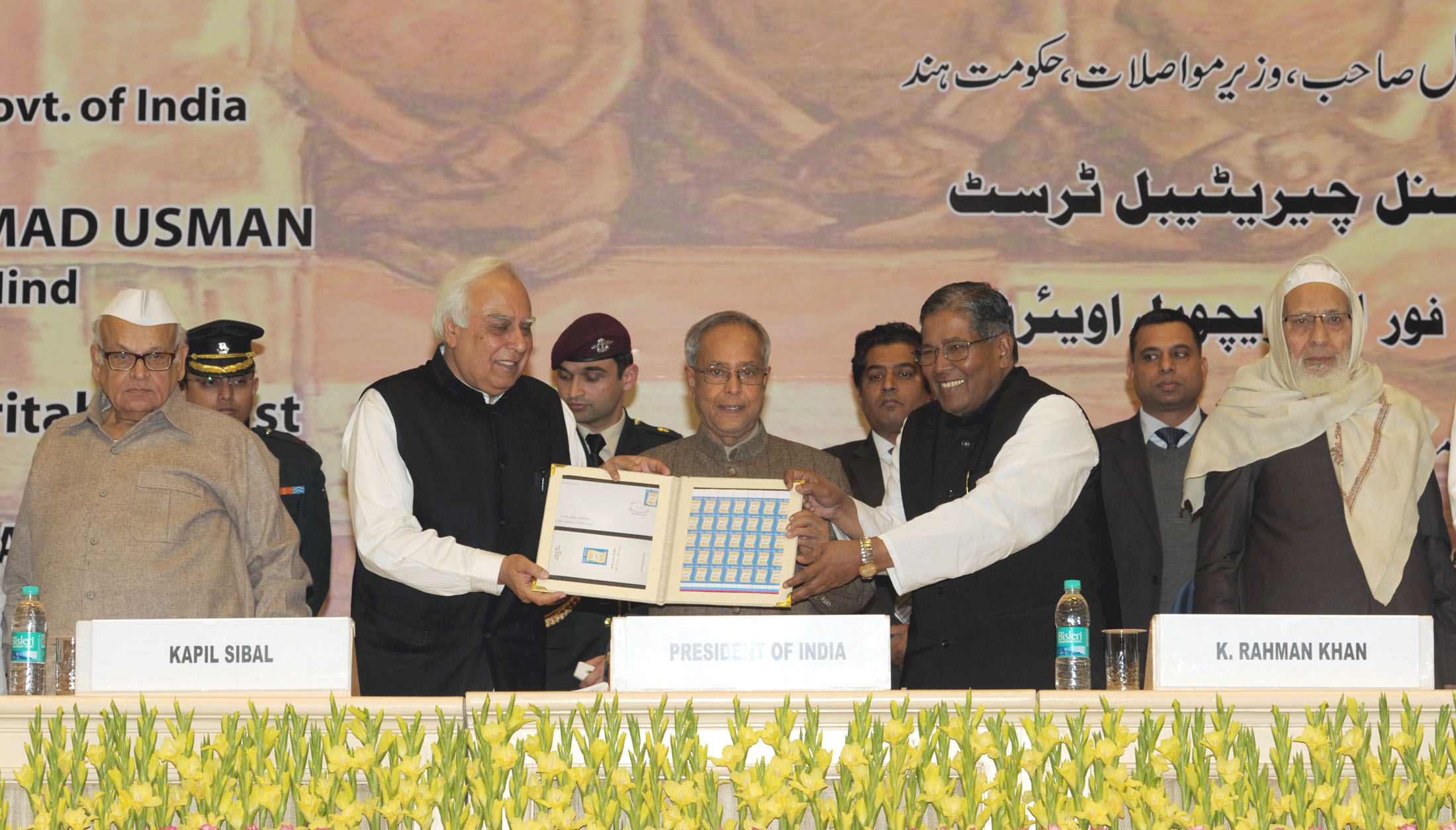
Pranab Mukherjee, the former President of India, releasing commemorative stamp on the Silk Letter Movement.

In January 2013, the President of India, Pranab Mukherjee released a commemorative postage stamp on the Silk Letter Movement, to commemorate the sacrifices these groups made for the Indian independence movement. Indian author and historian Ela Mishra wrote Reshmi Rumaal Sharyantra: Ek Muslim Kraantikari Aandoloan.
