= Pakistan Boy Scouts Association =

National Scouting organization

- Headquarters: Sumbul Park. Garden Avenue, P.O. Box 1792, Islamabad, Pakistan
- Country: Pakistan
- Founded: 1947
- Membership: 710,201
- Chief Scout of Pakistan: Asif Ali Zardari
- Affiliation: World Organization of the Scout Movement
- Website www.pakscouts.org

The Pakistan Boy Scouts Association (PBSA) (Urdu: پاکستان بوائے اسکا وٹ ایسوسی ایشن) is the national Scouting organization of Pakistan and has 526,626 members (as of 2011). Scouting was founded in Pakistan as part of the British Indian branch of The Scout Association. The PBSA was officially founded in 1947, immediately after independence from the British and became a member of the World Organization of the Scout Movement in April 1948.

== History ==
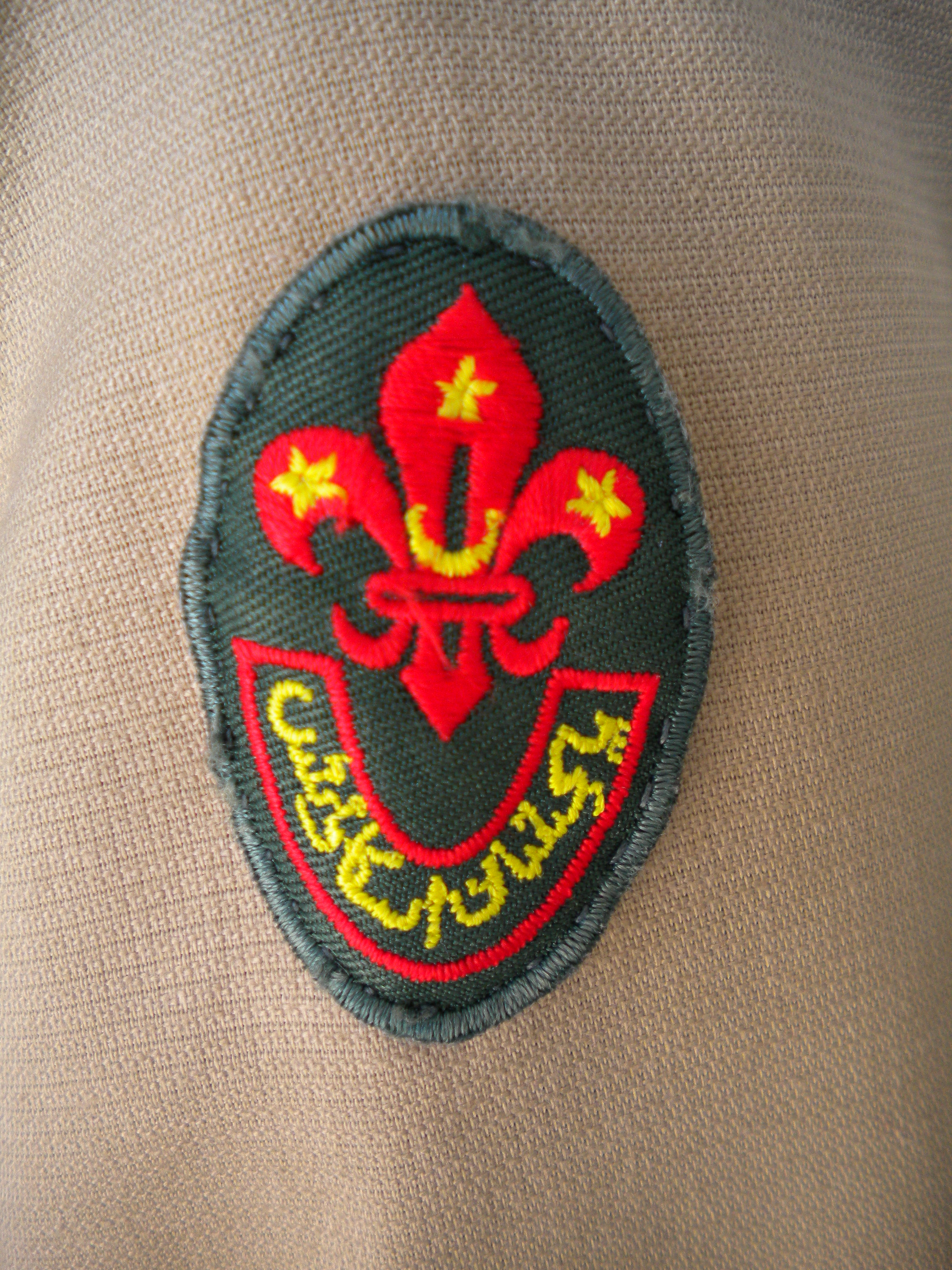

On Scouting, Pakistan's founder Muhammad Ali Jinnah said

Scouting can play a very vital role in forming the character of our youth, promoting their physical, mental and spiritual development and making them well disciplined, useful and good citizens. We are living in a far from perfect world. Despite the progress of civilization, the law of jungle, unfortunately, still prevails. Might is considered right and the strong do not refrain from exploiting the weak. Self advancement, greed and lust for power sway the conduct of individuals, as that of nations.

J. S. Wilson, Director of the Boy Scouts International Bureau, visited Karachi in 1952 as guest of J.D. Shuja, the General Secretary of the Pakistan Boy Scouts Association. During his visit, he saw Bhit Island, off Karachi, a fishing community primarily of refugees, who had been adopted by a Karachi Scout group, the Rovers and older Scouts of which were staffing a school until a regular teacher could be appointed. In Bahawalpur, Wilson was welcomed by Brigadier M.A. Abbasi, Deputy Chief Scout Commissioner who had been at the 1951 World Jamboree in Austria and would later lead the Pakistani contingent at the 1957 Jubilee Jamboree. At Lahore, Wilson met the Scouts and Bluebirds (Brownies) of the Deaf and Dumb Institute, and visited A.R. Sardar Hussain, Scout Camp Chief for Pakistan, Squadron Leader H.V. Bhatty, Scout Provincial Secretary, Nicholas Rozario, Deputy Camp Chief (East Pakistan), and Mir M. Mohsin, Deputy Camp Chief (West Pakistan), who later succeeded Shuja as General Secretary.

Scouting continued in East and West Pakistan as part of the Pakistan Boy Scouts Association until the country was split in the 1970s.

Niaz M. Khan served on the World Scout Committee of the World Organization of the Scout Movement from 1963 to 1969. In 1969, Mr. Khan was awarded the Bronze Wolf of the World Organization of the Scout Movement by the World Scout Committee for exceptional services to world Scouting.

Shafiq Ahmed Jaskani formerly served as National Secretary of Pakistan Boy Scouts.

== Structure ==
The Scouting movement in Pakistan is governed by the Ordinance No. XLIII of 1959 (known as Pakistan Boy Scouts Association Ordinance, 1959) and the subsequent rules, latest being those published vide SRO 140/KE/93 in the Gazette of Pakistan, Extra July 27, 1993, and known as Pakistan Boy Scouts Association Rules, 1992. These rules of 1992 which define the policies to follow organizational setup for effective management and rules for administration of Pakistan Boy Scouts Association (PBSA) are also termed as Policy, Organisation and Rules (POR) of PBSA.

From September 2007, Scouting became compulsory in schools. The aim is to have one million youth volunteers to help out in emergencies. Two per cent of exam fees collected by the examination boards are paid to the various Scouting and Guiding organisations.

Scouting is practically managed in Pakistan by the provincial Scout associations; the purpose of the smaller Districts is to manage the movement efficiently and as per the rules and regulations of PBSA.

Currently PBSA has Ten provincial associations, namely:

- Punjab Boy Scouts Association
- Sindh Boy Scouts Association
- Khyber Pakhtunkhwa (formerly Northwest Frontier Province) Boy Scouts Association
- Balochistan Scouts Association
- Gilgit-Baltistan Boy Scouts Association
- Azad Jammu and Kashmir Boy Scouts Association
- Islamabad Boy Scouts Association
- Federally Administered Tribal Areas Boy Scouts Association
- Pakistan International Airlines (PIA) Boy Scouts Association
- Pakistan Railways Boy Scouts Association

=== Sea Scouting in Pakistan ===
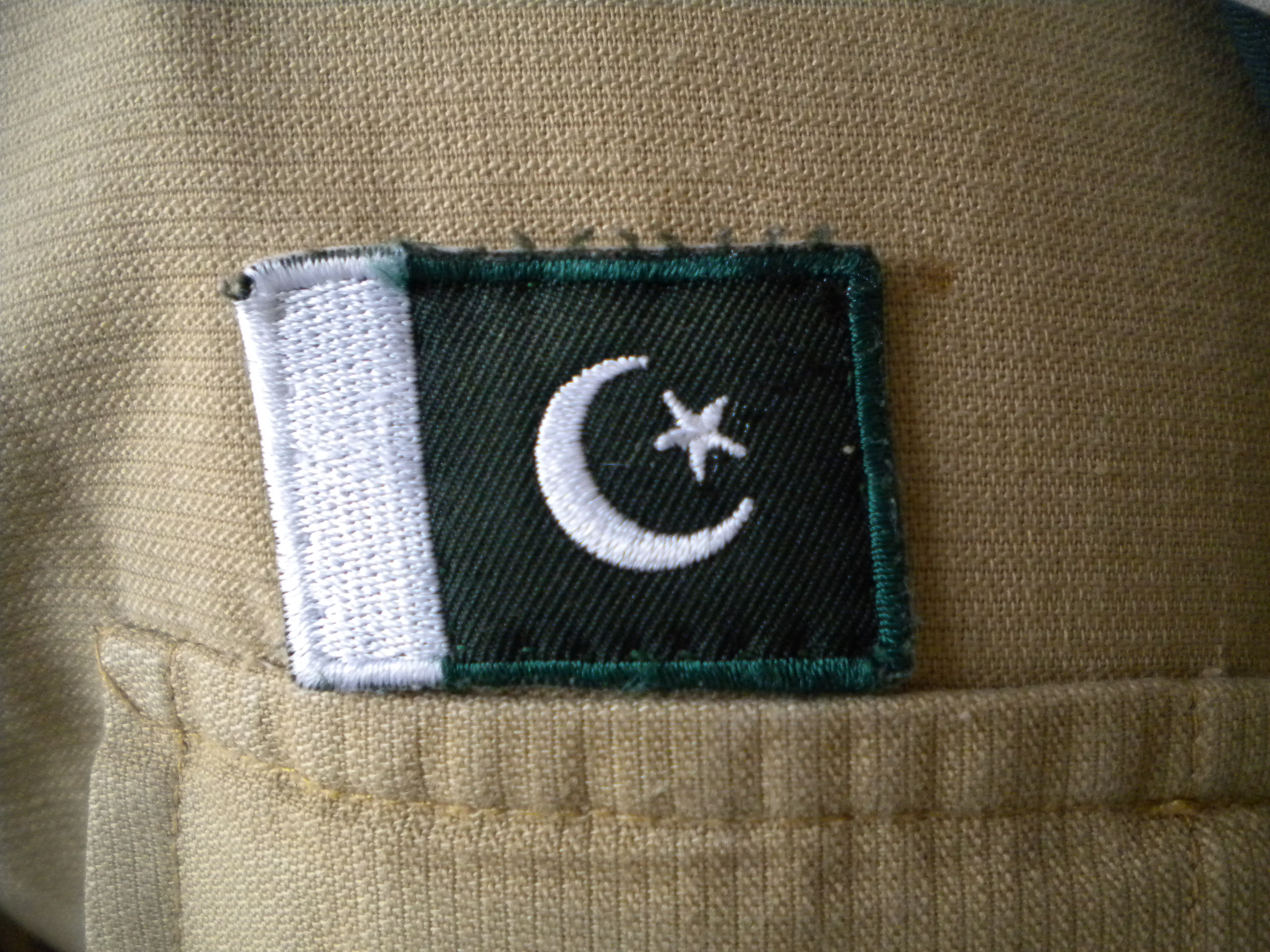
Flag on Pakistani Scout uniform

Karachi Sea Scout is currently the only scout group offering Sea Scouting in Pakistan. It was established in 1938 and is registered with Karachi Open District of Sindh Boy Scout Association. Currently its Skipper and Chief Sea Scout Shaikh Mohammed Altaf is leading the group.

=== Ismaili District Boy Scouts Association ===
The Ismaili District Boy Scouts Association (IDBSA) is a branch of the Sindh Boy Scouts Association (SBSA), one of the nine provincial Scout associations of the Pakistan Boy Scouts Association, comprising 18 districts throughout the Sindh Province. There are four Scouts Districts in Karachi: City Scouts District Karachi, Karachi Open Scouts District, Karachi Private Schools Scouts District and Ismaili District Boy Scouts Association. In 1994, the Executive Committee of SBSA decided to form the fourth district, the Ismaili District Boy Scouts Association, for the management of Ismaili Scouts Groups of Karachi, which were earlier registered with Karachi Open Scouts District.

Scouting in Pakistan's Ismaili community was commenced with guidance of the first Ismaili Chief Scout of Ismaili Scout Groups, H.S.H. Prince Ali Salman Khan in 1930. At that time, Scouting in the Ismaili community was lacking in expertise and trained manpower. Mr. Ramchandani Bulchand, a trained and qualified leader was brought in as Group Scoutmaster of Kharadar Scouts Group, as well as Honorary Commissioner for Ismaili Scouts Association, and later became the Scoutmaster of Garden Scouts Group.

In 1936, the H.H. Prince Aga Khan Ismaili Scouts Association (ISA) was established, consisting of Scout Groups, Girl Guide Companies, bands and orchestras. Later, upon advice and instruction from Sindh Provincial Scouts Headquarters, the name of the association was changed to H.H. Prince Aga Khan Association for Ismaili Scouts, Guides, Bands and Orchestras, and finally known as Shia Imami Association for Ismaili Scouts, Guides, Bands and Orchestras, Karachi.

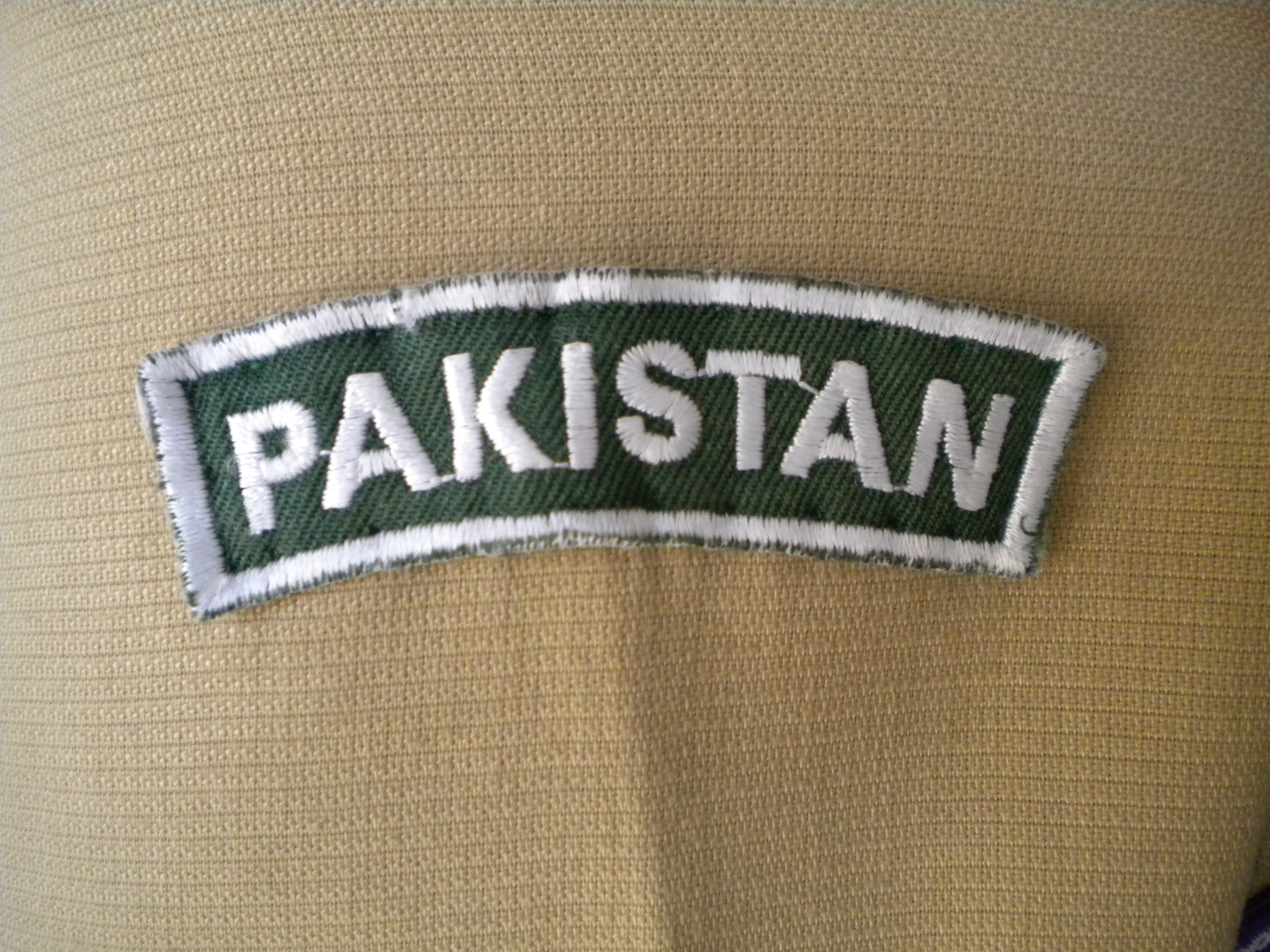

As Bulchand emigrated to India in 1952, Mr. Iqbal Ahmed Qureshi, Skipper and Chief of the Karachi Sea Scouts was appointed as Honorary Organizer of the association in 1954.

The present Chief Scout of Ismaili Scout Groups is H.S.H. Prince Amyn Muhammad Aga Khan. There are 26 Ismaili Scouts Groups under Ismaili District Boy Scouts Association.

== National Executives ==
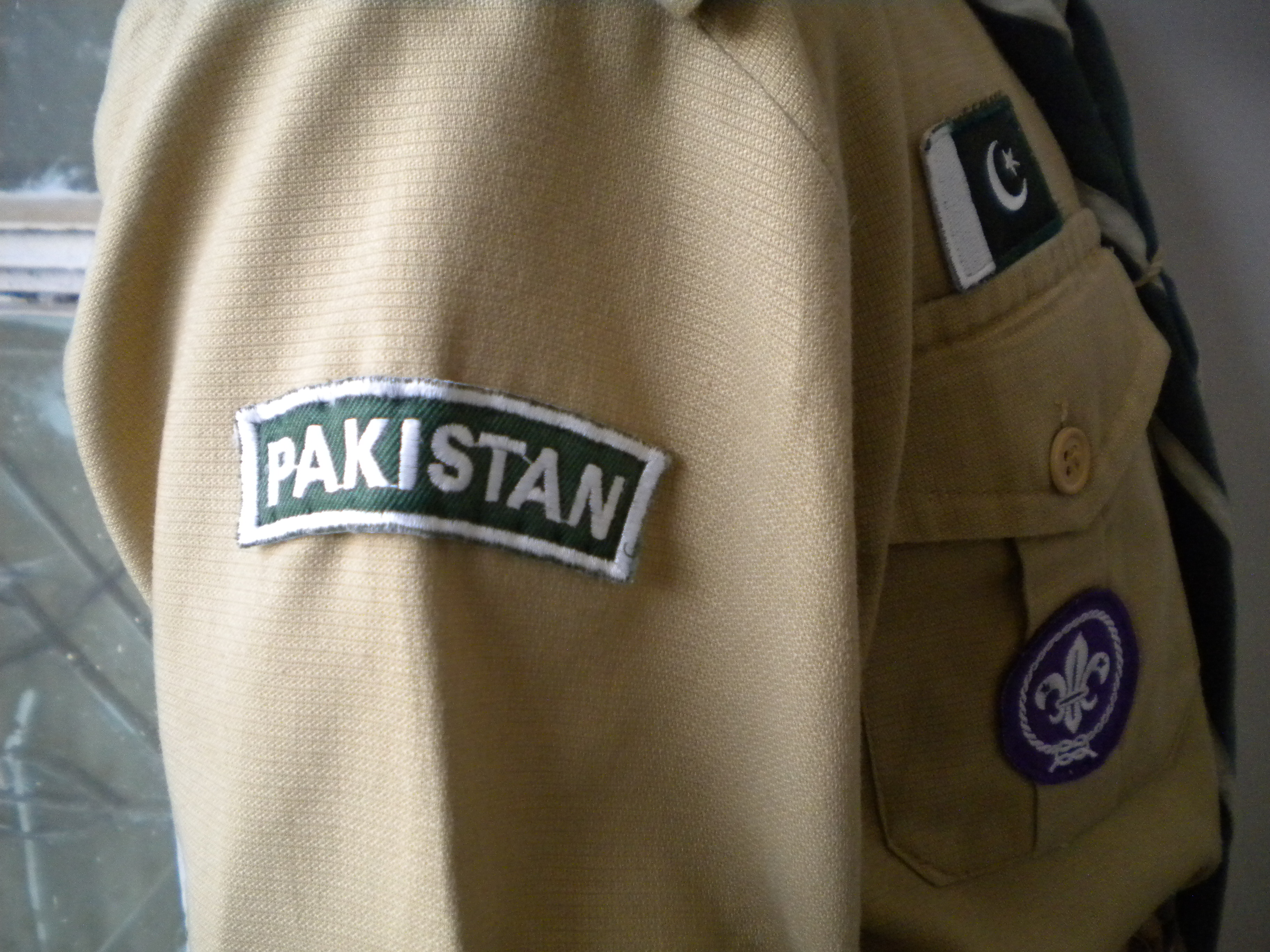
Emblem on Pakistani Scout

The national executive body will be elected upon the next meeting of National Council of Pakistan Boy Scouts Association.

== Program ==
Scouts have gained the respect of the citizens for their untiring work during floods, earthquake and other human and natural disasters. They have collected and distributed food and clothing. They have evacuated trapped people to safety, and run first aid stations in refugee camps. They have been active in helping rebuild destroyed villages.

Scout program emphasis is on community service and conservation.

There is a program for handicapped Scouts supported by former Scouts in the Baden-Powell Guild.

=== Sections ===
- Shaheen Scouts/Cubs-ages 6+ to 11
- Scouts-ages 11+ to 17
- Rovers-ages 17+ to 25

=== Shaheen Motto ===
The Shaheen Motto is Buland Perwaz (Fly High).

=== Scout Motto ===
The Scout Motto is Al-Mustaid (Be Prepared).

=== Rover Motto ===
The Rover Motto is Khidmat (Service).

Scout Wadah (for all levels of scouts)

May wadah karta hun kai Allah Tallah; Mohammed Rasool Allah Khatim-ul-nabeen salallahu wa aliy wasalm; Pakistan kai aid karda faraiz ki adaigi, dosroon ki madad aur Scout kanoon ki pabandi mai apni puri koshish karoon ga. oath

=== Scout and Rover Law ===
- Scout/Rover qabil-e-aitmaad hota hai

(A Scout/Rover is trustworthy)

- Scout/Rover wafadar aur farmanbardar hota hai

(A Scout/Rover is loyal and obedient)

- Scout/Rover khush ikhlaq aur madadgar hota hai

(A Scout/Rover is courteous and helpful)

- Scout/Rover har aik ka dost aur har Scout ka bhai hota hai

(A Scout/Rover is a friend to all and a brother to every other Scout)

- Scout/Rover meharban aur bahadur hota hai

(A Scout/Rover is kind and courageous)

- Scout/Rover kifayat shuar hota hai (A Scout/Rover is thrifty)
- Scout/Rover pakeeza aur hans mukh hota hai

(A Scout/Rover is clean and cheerful)

== Emblems ==
The membership badges of the Pakistan Boy Scouts Association incorporate elements of the flag of Pakistan.

== See also ==
- Pakistan Girl Guides Association
- Afghanistan Scout Association
- Ghous Ali Shah

== Bibliography ==
- Policy, Organization, Rules (Altered/Amended till 2013) National Headquarters, Pakistan Boy Scouts Association
- Rahnuma-e-Scout Leader (Scout Leader Handbook) published by National Headquarters, Pakistan Boy Scouts Association
