= Nizamabad =

Nizamabad, Nezamabad, or Nazmabad, may refer to:

== India ==
- Nizamabad, Telangana, a city
  - Nizamabad Municipal Corporation
  - Nizamabad district
    - Nizamabad mandal
  - Nizamabad Lok Sabha constituency
- Nizamabad, Uttar Pradesh, a town

== Iran ==
=== Fars Province ===
- Nezamabad, Arsanjan, a village in Arsanajan County
- Nezamabad, Darab, a village in Darab County
- Nezamabad, Eqlid, a village in Eqlid County
- Nezamabad, Fasa, a village in Fasa County
- Nezamabad, Jahrom, a village in Jahrom County
- Nezamabad, Kazerun, a village in Kazerun County

=== Golestan Province ===
- Nizamabad, Golestan, a city in Golestan Province, Iran
- Nezamabad Rural District, in Golestan Province

=== Hamadan Province ===
- Nezamabad, Hamadan, a city in Hamadan Province, Iran

=== Hormozgan Province ===
- Nizamabad, Hormozgan, a village in Hormozgan Province, Iran

=== Kerman Province ===
- Nizamabad, Kerman, a city in Kerman Province, Iran
- Nazmabad, Anbarabad, a village in Kerman Province, Iran
- Nezamabad, Bardsir, a village in Kerman Province, Iran
- Nazmabad, Rafsanjan, a village in Kerman Province, Iran
- Nazmabad, Rudbar-e Jonubi, a village in Kerman Province, Iran

=== Kermanshah Province ===
- Nezamabad, Kermanshah, a village in Kermanshah County

=== Markazi Province ===
- Nazmabad, Markazi, a village in Markazi Province, Iran
- Nezamabad, Markazi, a village in Markazi Province, Iran
- Nezamabad, Shazand, a village in Markazi Province, Iran

=== Mazandaran Province ===
- Nezamabad, Mazandaran, a village in Amol County

=== Qazvin Province ===
- Nezamabad, Qazvin, a village in Qazvin Province, Iran

=== Razavi Khorasan Province ===
- Nezamabad, Razavi Khorasan, a village in Razavi Khorasan Province, Iran

=== Tehran Province ===
- Nezamabad, Tehran, a village in Tehran Province, Iran

=== West Azerbaijan Province ===
- Nezamabad, Miandoab, a village in Miandoab County
- Nezamabad, Naqadeh, a village in Naqadeh County

=== Zanjan Province ===
- Nezamabad, Zanjan, a village in Zanjan County

== Pakistan ==
- Nizamabad, Pakistan, a small town in Gujranwala District, Punjab, Pakistan

== See also ==
- Nazemabad (disambiguation)
- Nazimabad, Karachi, Pakistan
- Nizam (disambiguation)
- Nizampatnam, village in Andhra Pradesh, India
