= Nizam (disambiguation) =

Nizam of Hyderabad was the title of the ruler of Hyderabad State in India.

Nizam or Nezam may also refer to:

- Nizam (name), a given and surname, including a list of people with the name
  - Nizam (lyricist) (1951–2015), lyricist in the Odia movie industry
- Nizam (title), a title for sovereigns of Indian states
- Nizam Club, in Saifabad, Hyderabad, India
- Nizam College, Hyderabad, India
- HMAS Nizam (G38), a Royal Australian Naval vessel
- O R Nizam Road, in Chittagong, Bangladesh, named after Obaidur Rahman Nizam (1902–1970)
- Rover Nizam, a 1930s car model

== See also ==
- Nizam al-Din (disambiguation)
- Nizami (disambiguation)
- Nizam-ul-Mulk (disambiguation)
- Nizamabad (disambiguation)
- Nazim (disambiguation)
