= Nazemabad =

Nazemabad (Persian: ناظم اباد) may refer to:

- Nazemabad, East Azerbaijan
- Nazemabad, Kurdistan

== See also ==
- Nizamabad (disambiguation)
