= Nizami =

Nizami (Persian: نظامی), also spelled Nezami, may refer to:

== People ==
- Nizami (name), a list of people with the given name or surname
- Nizami Aruzi, Persian author and poet often referred to as Nizami

== Places ==
- Nizami raion, a settlement and rayon in Baku, Azerbaijan
- Nizami, Goranboy, a village and municipality in the Goranboy Rayon of Azerbaijan
- Nizami, Sabirabad, a village and municipality in the Sabirabad Rayon of Azerbaijan
- Nizami Order, a Sufi order in South Asia
- Nizami, Armenia, a village in the Ararat Province of Armenia
- Nezami, Iran, a village in Semnan Province, Iran

== Other uses ==
- Nizami (opera)
- Dars-i-Nizami, an Islamic study curriculum used in South Asia
- 3770 Nizami, an asteroid
- Nizami Museum of Azerbaijan Literature, in Baku, Azerbaijan
- Nizami Mausoleum, built in honor of Nizami Ganjavi in Ganja, Azerbaijan
- Nizami Gəncəvi (Baku Metro), built in honor of Nizami Ganjavi in Baku, Azerbaijan
- Nizami (plural: Nizamis), people who were serving Nizam of Hyderabad in various capacities

== See also ==
- Nizamiyya (disambiguation)
- Nizam (disambiguation)
- Nizam al-Din (disambiguation)
