= Alvis FWD =

The Alvis FWD, also called the Alvis 12/75, is a car produced by the British car manufacturer Alvis from 1928 to 1930. It was one of the first production road cars to have front-wheel drive. (hence the name FWD, or Front Wheel Drive).

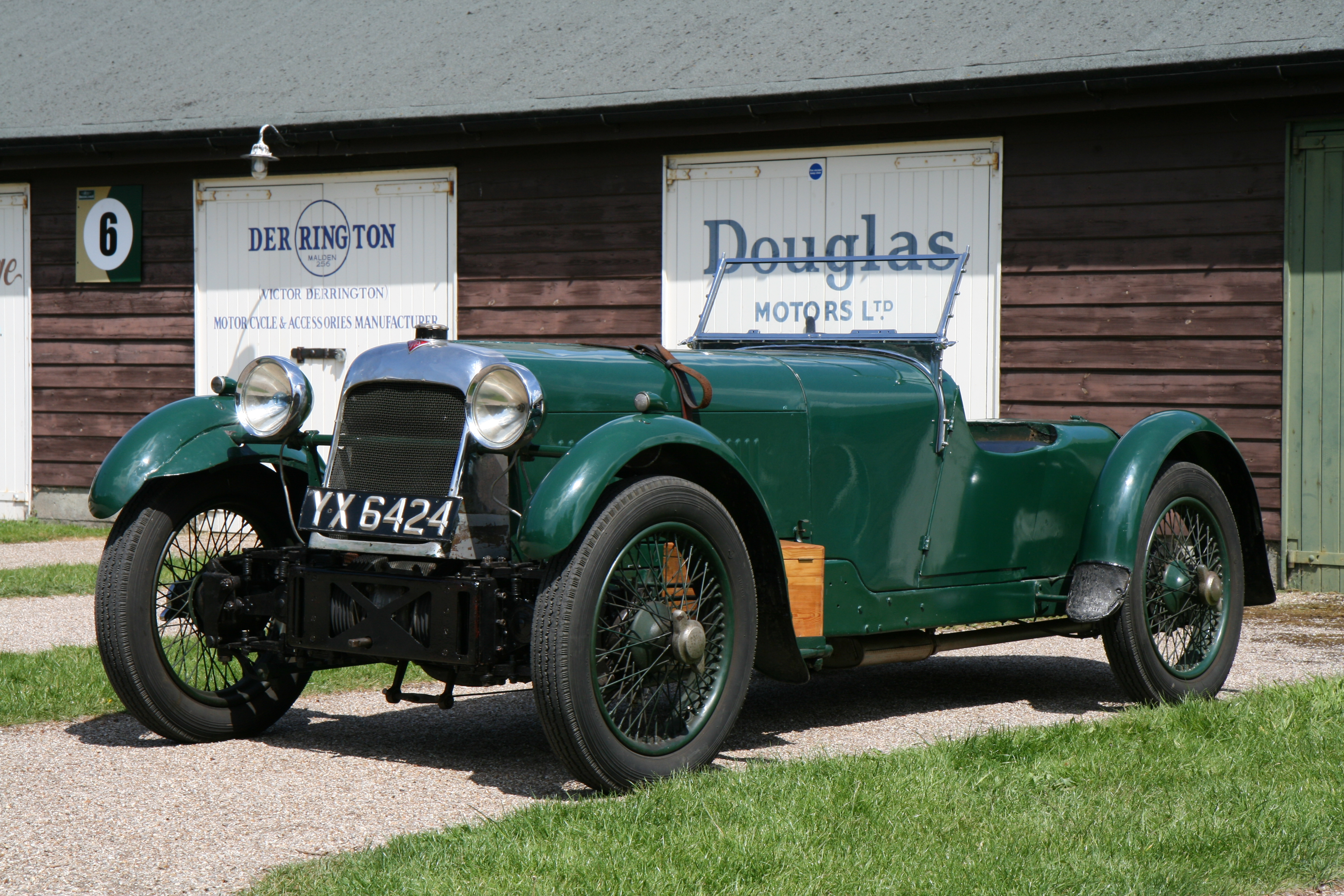
1928 Alvis 12/75 Front Wheel Drive open 2-seater

== Description ==
This model was completely redesigned and technically bore little resemblance to the road models produced previously. Rather, it was the result of experience Alvis had gained with front-wheel drive vehicles, which had been used and continuously developed in motorsports since 1925. The considerable effort Alvis had put into motorsport, which had tied up significant resources in technical development and financial resources, was now to pay off with the new, advanced road model.

With the FWD model, which was intended to replace the previous 12/50 SD, 12/50 TG and 12/50 TH models, Alvis addressed a new group of buyers in the mid-range market segment, away from the previous, rather conservative, towards a younger, more technically open-minded group.

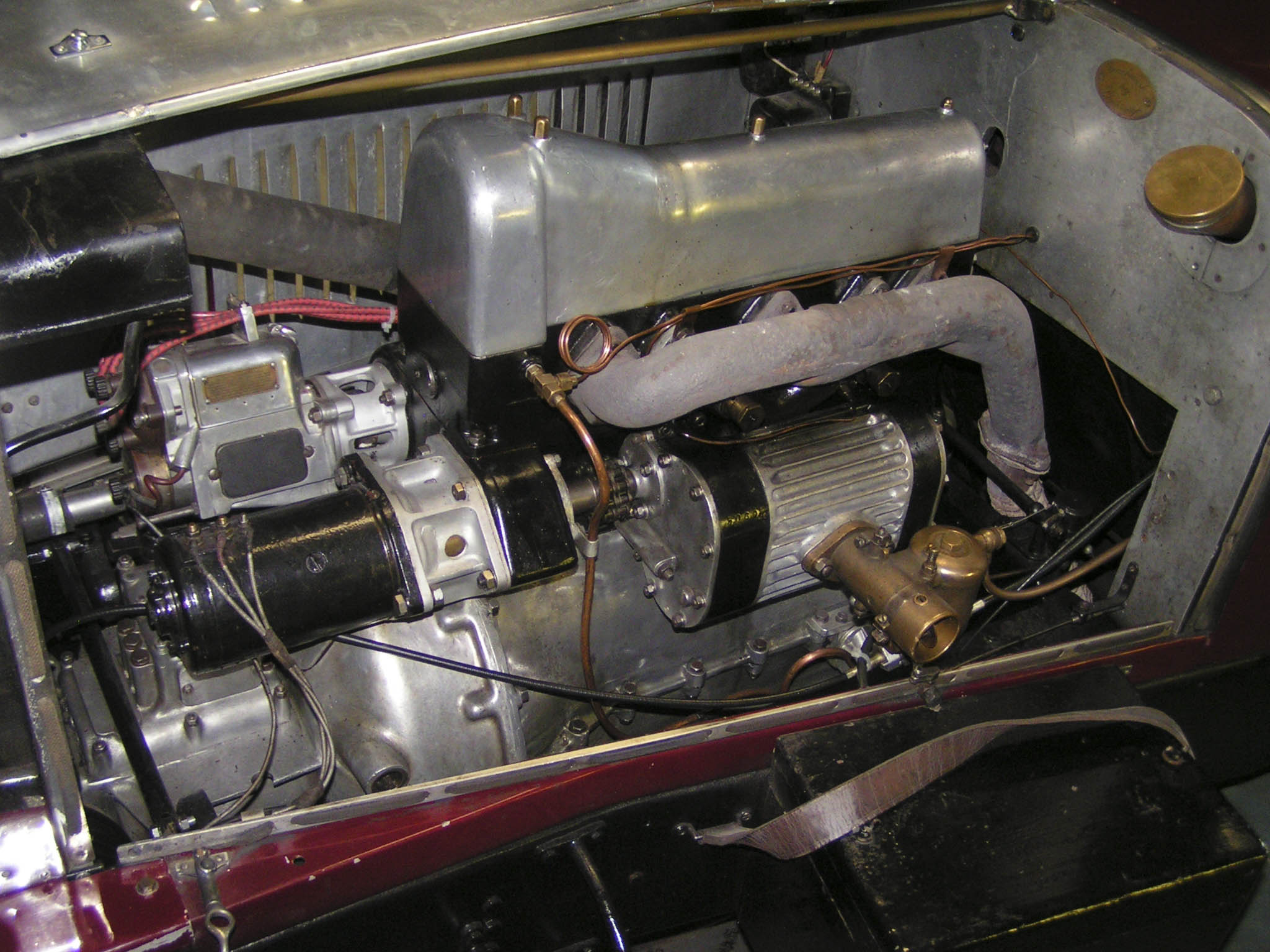
1928 Alvis Model F.D. 12/75 (Front Wheel Drive), showing 1.5L supercharged engine

The car had a four-cylinder inline engine with an overhead camshaft. Equipped with a single Solex carburettor, the 1482 cc engine (bore × stroke = 68 mm × 102 mm) produced 50 brake horsepower (37 kW) at 5500 rpm. Optionally, a supercharger could be fitted, the carburettor system could be expanded to two Solex carburettors, and the compression ratio could be reduced from 1:5.7 to 1:5.0. This gave the engine a peak output of 75 brake horsepower (56 kW). The cars reached a top speed of approximately 136 km/h.

The chassis was also unique: all four wheels had independent suspension on quarter-elliptic transverse leaf springs, similar to a double-wishbone suspension. The front wheels were driven.

The FA and FD variants had a short wheelbase of 2591 mm, while the FB and FE (the former only produced in 1928) had a significantly longer wheelbase of 3048 mm. However, all of these variants failed to meet the manufacturer's sales expectations and were therefore discontinued in 1929.

== Eight-cylinder variant ==
In 1929, a roadster appeared on the long chassis, equipped with an eight-cylinder engine with two overhead camshafts. The displacement of the 8/15, at 1491 cc (bore × stroke = 55 mm × 78.5 mm), was only slightly larger than that of the four-cylinder, but the engine, equipped with a single SU carburettor, produced 125 brake horsepower (93 kW). This enabled the car to reach a top speed of 104 miles per hour (167 km/h) and was also successful in several races. In 1930, the model was discontinued without replacement.

== End of production ==
For the manufacturer Alvis, the FWD was ultimately not a commercial success, but actually exacerbated the company's financial crisis: The advanced technology was not yet mature enough for everyday use, and the break with technical habits was too great for the previously rather conservative customer base. Above all, the introduction of the FWD coincided with the general economic decline in the wake of the Great Depression. After restructuring, Alvis replaced the FWD series (after producing some 155 such cars) with the more conservative 12/50 TJ model.

== Gallery ==
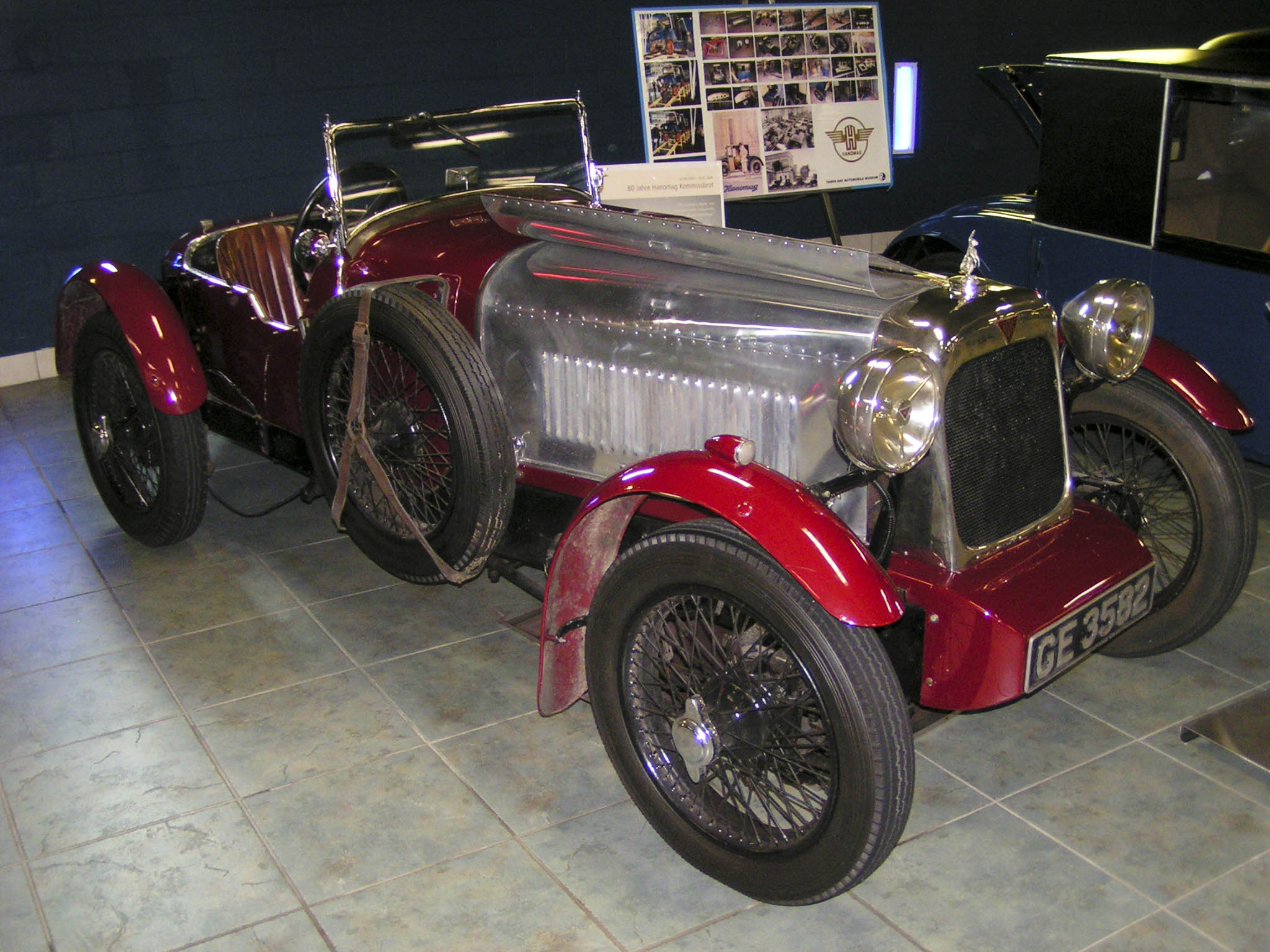
1928 Alvis Model FD 12/75 (supercharged engine and Tourist Trophy Race bodywork)

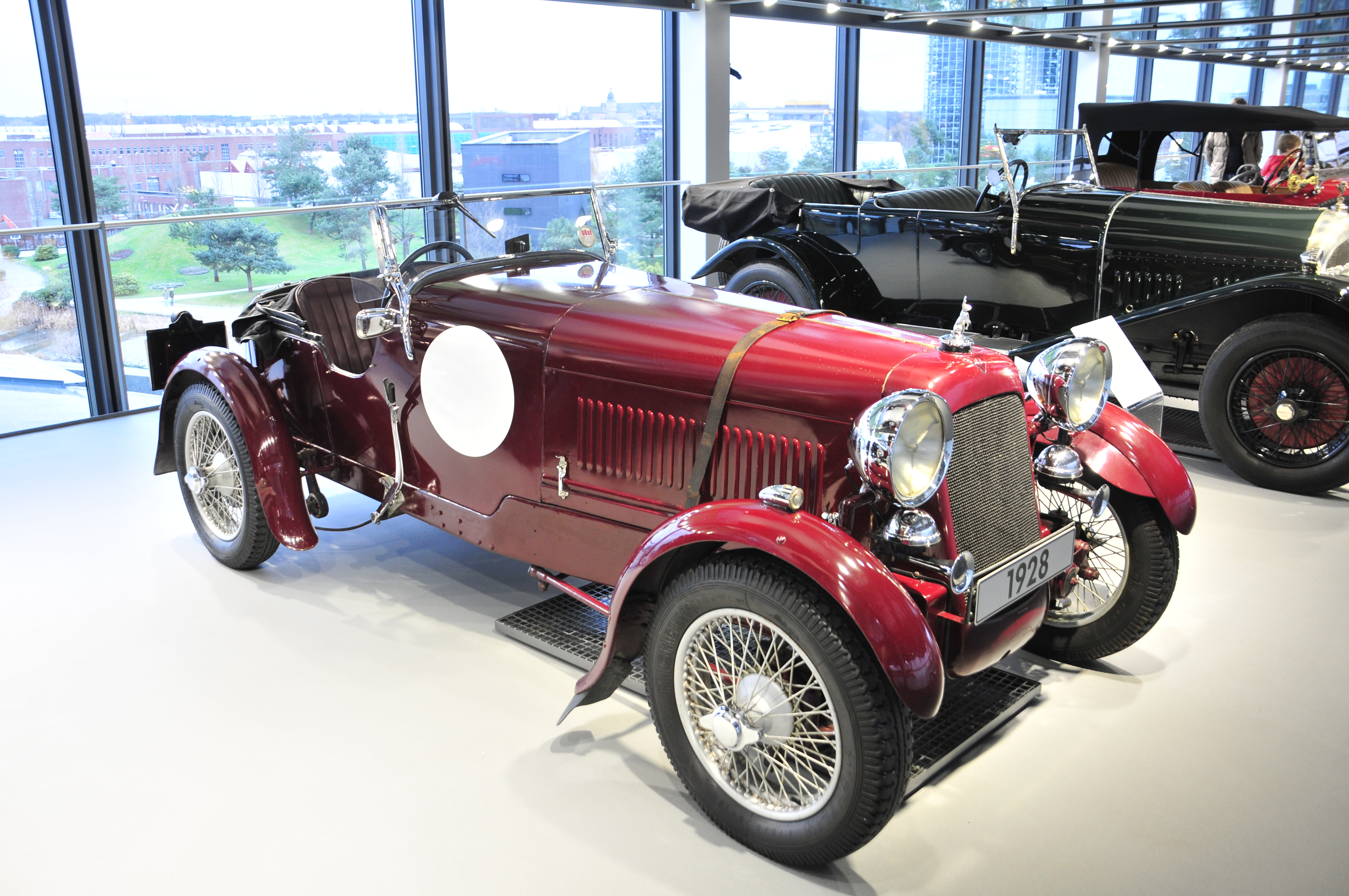
Alvis 12/75 "Tourist Trophy Replica" (1928) (Autostadt Wolfsburg)

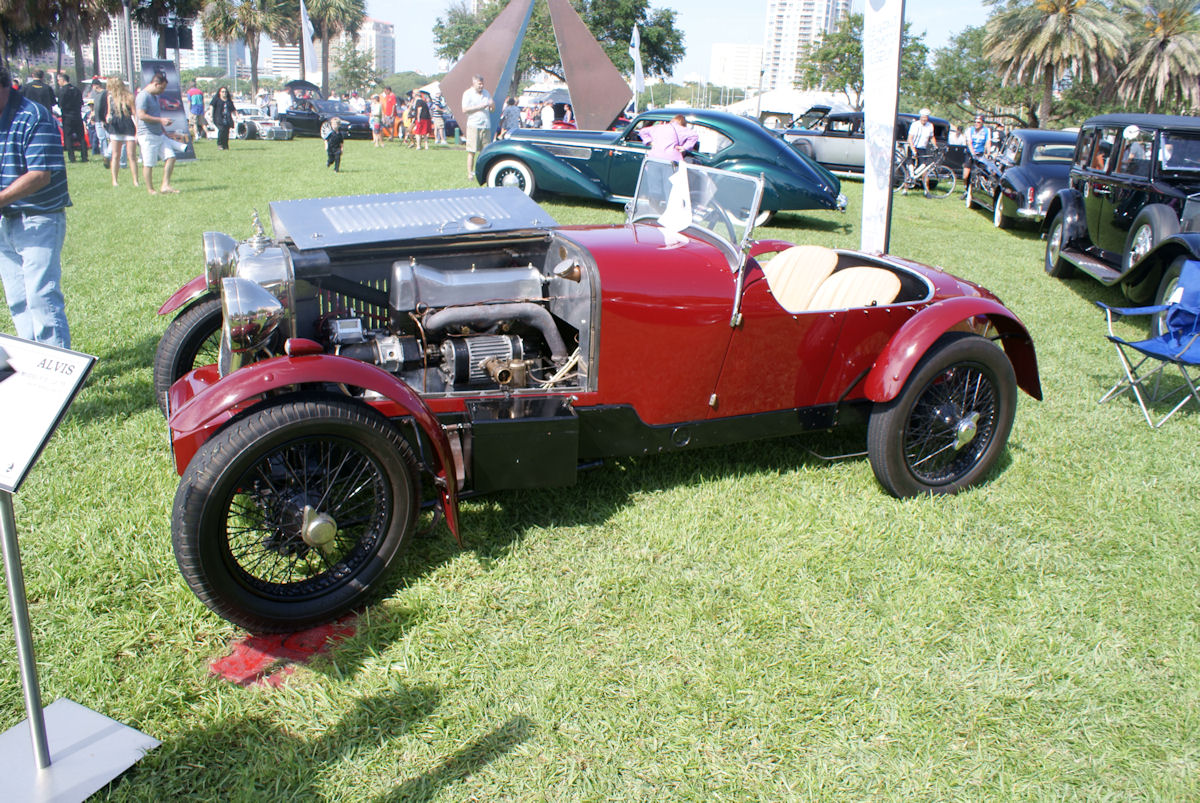
Alvis Model F.D. 12/75 1928

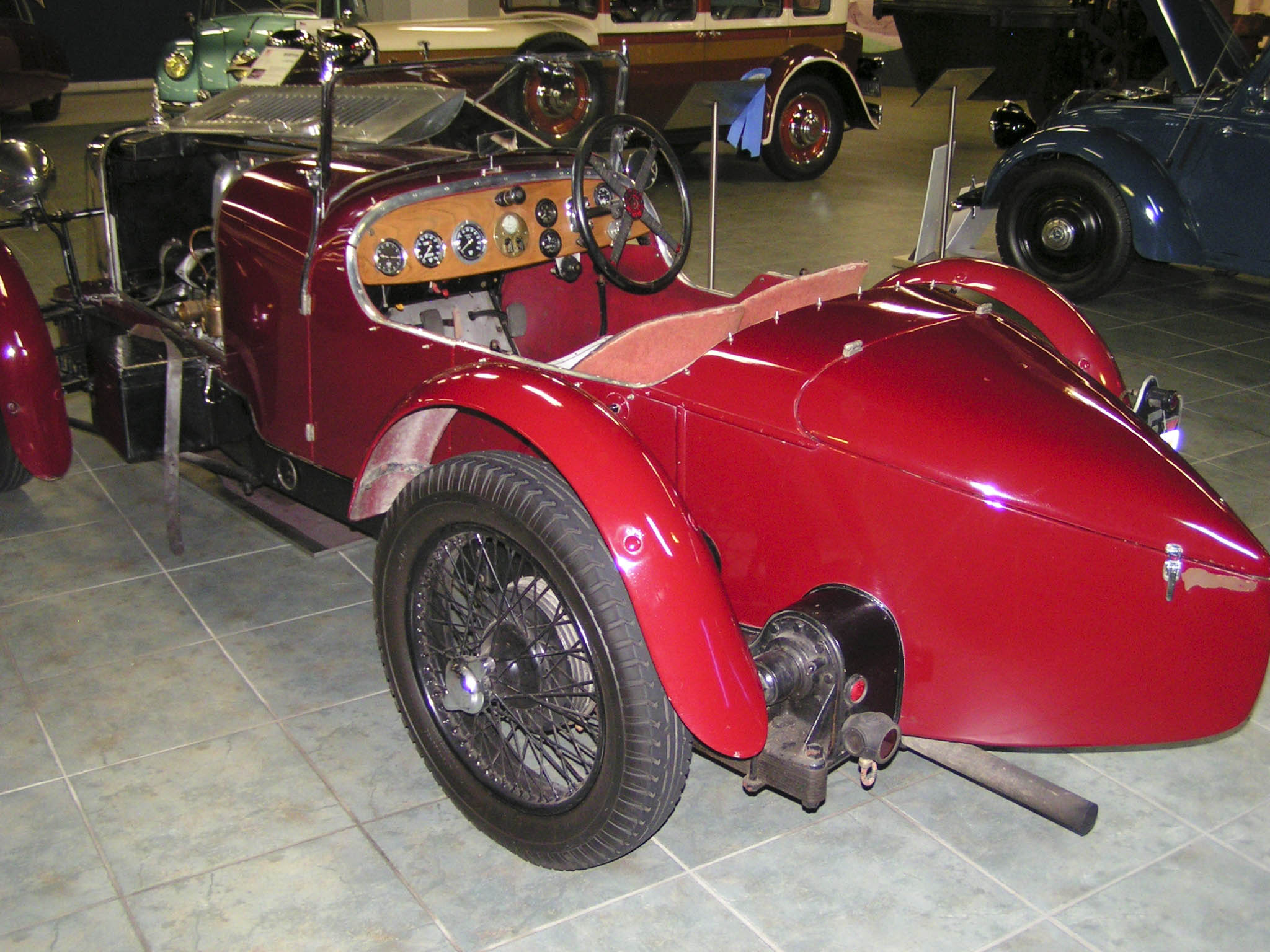
Alvis FWD, 1.5L supercharged engine and Tourist Trophy Race bodywork.

== Sources ==
Culshaw, David; Horrobin, Peter (1997). The complete catalogue of British cars: 1895 - 1975 (New ed.). Dorchester: Veloce Publ. p. 35-40. ISBN 1-874105-93-6.
