= Nizami (name) =

Nizami, also spelled Nezami, is both a surname and a given name of Iranian origin. It is popular in the Middle East, South Asia and the Caucasus. According to the US Census Bureau, the estimated population in the US is 223. Notable people with the name include:

== Surname ==
- Khwaja Hasan Sani Nizami, descendant of Nizamuddin Auliya and a Sufi
- Kamaluddin Nizami, Afghan politician
- Farhan Nizami (born before 1977), Islamic scholar at the University of Oxford
- Hameed Nizami (1915–1962), Pakistani journalist
- A. H. Nizami(1911-2005), Indian historian
- Saghar Nizami (1905–1983), Indian poet
- Majid Nizami (born 1928), Pakistani editor and publisher
- Hamid Nizami (1915–1962), Pakistani journalist
- Khalid Nizami, Pakistani comedian and actor
- Arif Nizami (1948–2021), Pakistani Journalist
- Motiur Rahman Nizami (born 1943), Bangladeshi politician
- Saifur Rahman Nizami (born 1916), Bangladeshi Islamic scholar
- Hasan Nizami, Persian language poet and historian
- Z.A. Nizami (1931–2013), Pakistani educationist
- Ayaz Nizami, Pakistani blogger and political prisoner
- Feroz Nizami (1910–1975), Pakistani filmmaker
- K. A. Nizami (1925–1997), Indian historian and diplomat
- Moeen Nizami (born 1965), Pakistani Urdu poet
- Bari Nizami, lyricist from West Punjab
- Khwaja Hasan Nizami (1878–1955), Indian sufi saint

== Given name ==
- Nezami Qunavi, 15th-century poet
- Nizami Aruzi (fl. 1110–1161), writer of Persian prose and poetry in the 12th century, famous for the Chahar Maqala
- Nizami Bahmanov (1948–2008), Azerbaijani politician
- Nizami Ganjavi (1141–1209), considered the greatest romantic epic poet in Persian history
- Nizami Hajiyev (born 1988), Azerbaijani football midfielder
- Nizami Pashayev (born 1981), Azerbaijani weightlifter
