= Nizamiyya (disambiguation) =

A Nizamiyya was a type of higher education institution founded in the 11th century by Nizam al-Mulk, vizier of the Seljuk Empire.

Nizamiyya, Nizamia, Nizamiye or Nezamiyeh may also refer to:

- Nizami order, a branch of the Chishti order
- Regular Ottoman army
- Nezamiyeh, Iran, a village in Razavi Khorasan, Iran

== See also ==
- Nizamia observatory, an observatory in Hyderabad, India
- Jamia Nizamia, an Islamic seminary in Hyderabad, India
- Nizamiye Courts, secular courts established in the Ottoman Empire during the Tanzimat era
- Nizamiye Mosque, a mosque in Midrand, South Africa
- Nizami (disambiguation)
