= Abul Wafa al-Afghani =

Hanafi scholar (1893–1975)

Maulana Abul Wafa al-Afghani

Personal life
- Born: Mahmud Shah; 25 June 1893 Qandahar
- Died: 23 July 1975 (aged 82) Hyderabad
- Resting place: Anwar-e-Naqshbandi Chaman, Misriganj, in Hyderabad
- Education: Madrasa Nizamia
- Occupation: Islamic research scholar, Hadith scholar, faqih

Religious life
- Religion: Islam
- Denomination: Sunni
- Jurisprudence: Hanafi

Muslim leader
- Teacher: Anwarullah Farooqui

Abul Wafa Syed Mahmūd Shah al-Qadri al-Hanafi al-Afghani (25 June 1893 – 23 July 1975), also known as Abu Wafa Al Afghani, was a Hyderabad-based Afghani Islamic scholar, Hanafi faqih, and researcher.

== Early life and education ==
Abul Wafa Al-Afghani was born in Qandahar on 10 Dhu al-Hijjah 1310 AH (25 June 1893 AD). His father, Syed Mubarak Shah Qadri, was an Islamic scholar.

He came to India from Qandahar for study and studied with scholars in Rampur and Gujarat in his teenage years. He subsequently traveled to Hyderabad, Deccan, in 1330 AH (1912) and enrolled in Madrasa Nizamia, where he graduated. His teachers included Anwarullah Farooqui, the founder of Jamia Nizamiya and Dairat al-Maarif al-Usmania, as well as Sheikh Abdus Samad, Sheikh Abdul Karim, Sheikh Ruknuddin, and Qari Muhammad Ayyub.

== Career ==
Following graduation, Afghani was appointed as a teacher at Madrasa Nizamia, where he spent several years teaching literary Arabic, jurisprudence, and hadith.

In 1948, under his supervision and with the support of his friends, he established a committee for the revival of Nu'mani sciences, Lajnat-u-Ihya al-Ma'ārif an-Nu'maniyyah, under which he published many valuable books of the Imams of the second and third centuries of Hijri. He volunteered his time, wealth, and knowledge to the extent possible.

Abd al-Fattah Abu Ghudda, who visited him, states that "there was nothing in his house except books, manuscripts, and writings. These books would be spread all around him. Abul Wafa would have only a few morsels at night, and his nights would be spent supplicating Allah."

== Books worked on ==
Afghani worked on the following books:

- At-Tahawi's Mukhtasar in Fiqh (in a volume)
- Research work on the third volume of Al-Bukhari's At-Tārīkh al-Kabīr
- Al-Khassaf's Kitāb an-Nafaqāt
- Al-Sarakhsi's Usool al-Sarakhsi
- Al-Sarakhsi's Sharh az-Ziyadāt – in 2 volumes
- Al-Dhahabi's Manaqib-u-Abi Hanifa Wa Sahibaihi Yousuf Wa Muhammad with al‑Kawthari
- Muhammad al-Shaybani's Kitab al-Hujjah Alā Ahl al-Madīnah (This book was researched by Mahdi Hasan Shahjahanpuri and published in 4 volumes under the supervision of Afghani.)
- Al-Shaybani's Kitāb al-Āthār
- Al-Shaybani's Kitab al-Asl (known as al-Mabsūt)
- Abu Abdullah As-Saimari (d. 1045 AD)'s Akhbār-u-Abi Hanīfa Wa Ashābihi
- Muhammad bin Yousuf As-Sālihi ash-Shāmi (d. 942 AH)'s Uqūd al-Jumān Fi Manāqib Al-Imam Al-Aẓam Abi Ḥanifah Al-Numan
- Abu Yusuf's Kitāb al-Āthār
- Abu Yusuf's Kitāb ar-Radd 'Alā Siyar al-Awza'i
- Abu Yusuf's Ikhtilaf Abi Hanifa wa Ibn Abi Layla
- Muhammad al-Shaybani's Kitāb al-Asl
- Al-Shaybani's Al Jami' al-Kabīr
- Al-Shaybani's Sharh Kitāb al-Āthār
- Al-Sharakhsi's An-Nukat on Al-Shaybani's Ziyādāt az-Ziyadāt

== Death ==
Afghani died on 13 Rajab 1395 AH (23 July 1975) in Hyderabad and was buried in Anwar-e-Naqshbandi Chaman, Misriganj, in Hyderabad.

== See also ==
- Anwarullah Farooqui
- Jamia Nizamia
- Muhammad Hamidullah

== Bibliography ==
- Nizami, Muhammad Fasihuddin (October 2000). Hazrat Allama Abul Wafa al-Afghani Ahl-e-Nazar Ki Nazar Mein [Hazrat Allama Abu al-Wafa al-Afghani In the eyes of the perspicacious] (in Urdu) (1st ed.). Hyderabad: Jamia Nizamia.
