= Nizami, Azerbaijan =

Nizami, Azerbaijan may refer to:

- Nizami, Goranboy
- Nizami, Sabirabad
