= Anwarullah Farooqui =

Indian university administrator

Muhammad Anwaarullah Farooqui
- Born: c. 1848 CE 4th Rab’ee Thani 1265 AH; Kandhar, Nanded, Hyderabad State, British India
- Died: 1917 (aged 68–69); Hyderabad, Hyderabad State, British India
- Resting place: Jamia Nizamia, Hyderabad, India
- Spouse: Daughter of Maulvi Haji Ameeruddin

Shaykh Ul Islam Imam Muhammad Anwaarullah Khan Farooqui is the founder of the Islamic university Jamia Nizamia, Hyderabad. His actual name is Muhammad Anwaarullah Farooqui and was bestowed the title of "Fadheelat Jung" by the Nizam.

== Early years ==
=== Birth ===
Imam Muhammad Anwaarullah Farooqui was born on 4th Rab’ee Thani 1265 Hijri in Kandhar, Nanded into a pious and respected family of Qazi's of Kandahar to Shujauddin Mir Adl (1810-1871) and Anwarunnisa Begum.

Shaykh Ul Islam's mother said that in the course of her pregnancy, she saw the Islamic prophet Muhammad reciting the Qur'an in a dream.

=== Family background ===
Shaykh Ul Islam's grandfather was Qazi Sirajuddin II, then Qazi of Kandhar and his grandmother was named Fatima.

As the name implies, Imam Muhammad Anwaarullah Farooqui is a descendant of the second Caliph of Islam,‘Umar Al Farooq through his ancestors who descend from Shaykh Badruddin Sulaiman, the eldest son of Shaykh Fariduddin Ganjshakar.

Shaykh Ul Islam was 23rd descendant of Shaykh Fariduddin Masud Ganjshakar.

Shaykh Farid was the 5th Generation of Sultan Shihabuddin Ali Farrukh Shah Kabuli (King of Balkh and the Governor of Khorasan, Khwarazmian Empire), who was again a descendant of Ibrahim ibn Adam, king of Balkh, who later on denounced kingdom and became a sufi saint also an early master of Chishti Order of Sufis

=== Education ===
When he was 7 years of age, his father handed over the Imam to Hafidh Amjad Ali, who was blind, to memorize the Qur'an. The Imam completed the memorization of the Quran at 11 years of age.

He received his introductory education from his father. He studied jurisprudence (Fiqh) and logic under Maulana Abdul Haleem Firangi Mahalli and Maulana Abdul Hayy Firangi Mahalli. He studied some works of jurisprudence under Maulvi Fayyazuddin Aurangabadi as well. He studied exegesis of the Quran (Tafseer) Shaykh ‘Abdullah Yemeni and received his authorization in Hadith from the same Shaykh.

== Employment and resignation ==
In 1285 Hijri, the Imam was appointed to a clerical position. After one and a half years, he was asked to record a usurious transaction. Instead, he tendered his resignation. His superior promised him that from then on such transactions would not be given to him. However, the Imam demurred and resigned.

== Jamia Nizamia ==
On 19th Dhul Hijjah, 1292 Hijri, a meeting was held at the house of Maulvi Muzafarruddin in which the thought was expressed that founding an Islamic university in Hyderabad, which would provide higher and specialized education in Islamic sciences was the need of the hour. This proposal was accepted by the 7th Nizam and Jamia Nizamia came into existence. A large number of scholars expressed the view that other than Imam Anwaarullah Farooqui, there seems to be none who can head such an institution. Thus, the Imam was appointed as the head of the institution.

== Appointment as a teacher to the Sixth Nizam ==
After the martyrdom of Maulvi Zamaan Khan Shaheed, his brother was appointed as the teacher of 6th Nizam - His Highness Nawab Mir Mahboob Ali Khan. However, he had other responsibilities to handle as well. Thus, he proposed the name of Imam Anwaarullah Farooqui and Syed Ashraf Hussain and got it approved from the court.

First, the Imam performed Istikhara and then accepted it. Thus, Imam Anwaarullah Farooqui became the teacher of the Sixth Nizam in 1295 Hijri.<

== Pilgrimage ==
Imam Anwaarullah Farooqui traveled to the two holy cities three times. The first time was in 1294 Hijri, the second was in 1301 Hijri and the third time was in 1305 Hijri. The third time, the Imam stayed there for three years. Apart from the necessities of life, he spent all his time in worship or in scouring the libraries. His book "Anwaare Ahmadi" was written at that time.

The Imam also got many important Islamic books copied at his own expense. The most important among them are: Kanz Ul ‘Ummaal (a compendium of Hadith in 9 volumes), Jame’ Masaneed Imam Azam, Sunan Baihaqui and many others.

In this journey, his sister and son died. The Imam himself got very sick and his life was despaired of. Finally on the insistence of the scholars and saints of Madina, chiefly on the insistence of Haji Imdadullah Muhajir Makki, Imam Anwaarullah Farooqui consented to return to Hyderabad.

== Appointment as the teacher of the Seventh Nizam ==
After returning from the holy cities, Imam Anwaarullah Farooqui was appointed as the teacher to the Seventh Nizam, His Exalted Highness Nawab Mir Osman Ali Khan.

== Minister of religious affairs ==
After the Seventh Nizam was crowned, Imam Anwaarullah Farooqui devoted all his time to the service of Islamic sciences. However, the Nizam asked him to become the Sadr Us Sudoor for all Deccan. Though the Imam objected that he was past the maximum age of government employment (55 years), the Nizam told him that there was none more suitable than him for this post.

Later on, the Imam was made the minister of Religious Affairs.

== Death ==
In 1336 Hijri, the Imam developed some abscesses on his back. No treatment availed and doubts were expressed that it was cancer. At last, the doctors confirmed that it was indeed cancer. By order of the Nizam, expert doctors were summoned, who reached the same conclusion. Surgery was performed.

After an extensive operation, the tumor was removed. The doctor congratulated the Imam that he was now absolutely healthy. The Imam thanked the doctor and asked him to check on him after Salaat Ul Maghrib.

The Imam was laid on the bed and he fainted. He started reciting the Declaration of Faith (La Ilaaha Illallaah..). As the sun set on the last day of Jamaadi Ul Ula, the Imam died.

Imam Muhammad Anwaarullah Farooqui was buried in Jamia Nizamia. Each year the ‘Urs of the Imam is held on 29th Jamaadi Ul Ula. The convocation of Jamia Nizamia is also held on the same date.

== Family ==
Imam Muhammad Anwaarullah Farooqui was married in 1289 Hijri to the daughter of Maulvi Haji Ameeruddin Sahab. She died in 1304 Hijri on 26th Ramadhan in Hyderabad. After this, the Imam did not remarry.

The Imam had two sons and four daughters. His first son, ‘Abdul Jaleel, was born in 1292 Hijri and died in 1295 Hijri. His second son, ‘Abdul Quddus, was born in 1297 Hijri and died in 1307 Hijri in Madina.

== Writings ==
Imam Muhammad Anwaarullah Farooqui was a prolific writer. He wrote the following books:

Al Kalaam Ul Marfoo’ Fee Maa Yata ‘Allaqa bil Hadeethil Maudhoo

Afaadatul Afhaam, Vol.1 and 2

Anwaarul Haqq

Anwaar-e-Ahmadi ANWAR E AHMADI

Haqeeqatul Fiqh, Vol. 1 and 2

Kitaab Ul Aql

Maqasid Ul Islam, Vol. 1 – 11 Maqasid-ul-Islam-vol-1 Anwar-Al-Tamjid-Fi-Adillati-Al-Touhid انوار التمجيد فى ادلة التوحيد

== As a Sufi ==
The Imam took acquired the introductory teachings of Tasawwuf from his father himself and received the Khilafah (i.e. the authorization to accept and guide disciples) in all the Sufi orders.

Later on, when he traveled to the holy cities for the first time, he again gave his allegiance to Haji Imdadullah Muhajir Makki and traversed the Sulook (the path to the Lord Almighty) under the guidance of the Shaykh.

Haji Imdadullah Muhajir Makki granted him the Khilafah in all the Sufi orders without any representation from the Imam’s side and instructed his disciples of Deccan to seek his help in their spiritual affairs. However, the Imam himself never asked anybody to give his pledge to him. If someone would request of their own accord, he would humbly say: I am not worthy of it. Give your pledge to someone worthy. If that person would insist, the Imam would include him in the order.

Usually, the Imam would accept disciples in the Qadri order. However, if a disciple desired to enter some other Sufi order, the Imam would oblige the disciple. If so desired, the Imam would give daily recitations and invocations as well. If someone had the eagerness to learn the sciences of gnosis and realization of Allah, the Imam would ask that person to attend the lessons of Futoohaat-e-Makkiyya.

=== Miracles ===
One night, a student of the Shaykh, Maulvi Abdul Samad was sleeping and the Imam was busy in reading. Suddenly, Maulvi Abdul Samad felt a certain uneasiness and woke up. The Imam requested him to get some water to drink. He did so and then went back to sleep.

The next day, after the class, the Imam told some selected students that the previous night he had felt thirsty, but there was no one to fetch water. Then, the Imam had cast his attention on the person who was sleeping who got up and fetched water for him.

Najeeba Khatoon, a student of the Imam was a great saint as well. She attended the lessons of Futuhaate Makkiyya, the great classic of Mohiuddin ‘Arabi, seated in a separate room. She said that she had seen Ghouse Azam coming to the lesson numerous times.

She said that once the Imam could not explain a point in the book properly. He would stop repeatedly. Najeeba Khatoon said that she saw a path cleared from there to the Ka’aba where Muhammad was seated and teaching. He said to his students: You please wait. This moment, my child Anwaarullah is unable to handle the text. Muhammad cast his benevolent attention on Imam Muhammad Anwaarullah. When the point was cleared with his attention, Muhammad became very happy and turned back to his students.

== See also ==
- Jamia Nizamia
- Zujajat al-Masabih
- Abul Wafa Al Afghani- (former Shaykh Ul Fiqh of Jamia Nizamia and Founder of Ihya Al Ma’arif An Nomaniya)
