= Nizam al-Din =

Nizam al-Din (Arabic: نظام الدّین, romanized: Niẓām al-Dīn, lit. 'Good Order of the Faith'), spelled variously Nizamuddin or Nizamüddin or etc. may refer to:

== People ==
- Niżām ad-Dīn Abū Muḥammad Ilyās ibn-Yūsuf ibn-Zakī ibn-Mu‘ayyad, or Nizami Ganjavi (1141–1209), Persian epic poet
- Nizamuddin Auliya (1238–1325), Sufi saint of the Chishti Order
- Nizamüddin Ahmed Pasha (died 1380), Ottoman grand vizier
- Koca Mehmed Nizamüddin Pasha (died 1439), Ottoman grand vizier
- Nizam al-Din Yahya (1417–1480), Mihrabanid malik of Sistan
- Jam Nizamuddin II (1440–1509), sultan of the Samma Dynasty
- Mohammed Nizamuddin (died 2016), Indian trade unionist and politician
- Nizamuddin Ahmad (1551–1621), Muslim historian of India
- G. Nizamuddin (born 1954), Indian politician
- Nizamuddin Shamzai (1952–2004) (Pakistani Islamic scholar)

== Places in India ==
- Nizamuddin West, Delhi
- Nizamuddin East, Delhi
- Hazrat Nizamuddin railway station, Delhi
- Nizamuddin Dargah, mausoleum in Delhi

== See also ==
- Hazrat Nizamuddin (disambiguation)
- Nizamettin (disambiguation)
- Nizami (disambiguation)
- Nizam (disambiguation)
