= Rover Nizam =

Sports car

The Rover Nizam was a small light-weight two seater sports bodied version of the 1931/32 Rover 10/25. The chassis was produced by Rover and the body came from Carbodies of Coventry.

The look of the car resembled the Alvis 12/60 and Silver Eagle models of the time, but lurking some considerable distance beneath the enormous bonnet/hood and proud (albeit false) radiator at its front was a 1,200 cc push-rod engine which ruled out membership of their elite club. A contemporary advertisement described the car not as a sports-car but as a semi-sports 2/seater.

The body, sitting on the standard Rover 10/25 chassis, was constructed of cellulose over a frame of "selected seasoned hardwood": the cellulose bodywork triggered mild derision in some quarters, but its light weight was an aid to performance. Two body colours were offered. Cars with light blue bodies were fitted with light blue leather seats and darker blue wheels and wings, while the black bodied car came with green or red wheels and wings and green or red leather seats.
