= Sir Syed University of Engineering and Technology =

Private research university in Karachi, Pakistan

Coordinates: 24°55′N 67°05′E

- جامعہَ سرسید برائے علومِ مہندسی و فنونِ سائنسی
- Motto: عَلَّمَ الْإِنسَانَ مَا لَمْ يَعْلَمْ
- Motto in English: He (Allah) has taught man that which he knew not.
- Type: Private university
- Established: 1993
- Founder: Z.A. Nizami
- Academic affiliations: Higher Education Commission of Pakistan; Pakistan Engineering Council
- Chancellor: Akber Ali Khan
- Vice-Chancellor: Dr. Munawwar Hussain
- Students: ~90,000
- Location: Karachi, Sindh, Pakistan
- Campus: Urban
- Colours: Purple, gold, olive green
- Nickname: SSUET
- Website: www.ssuet.edu.pk

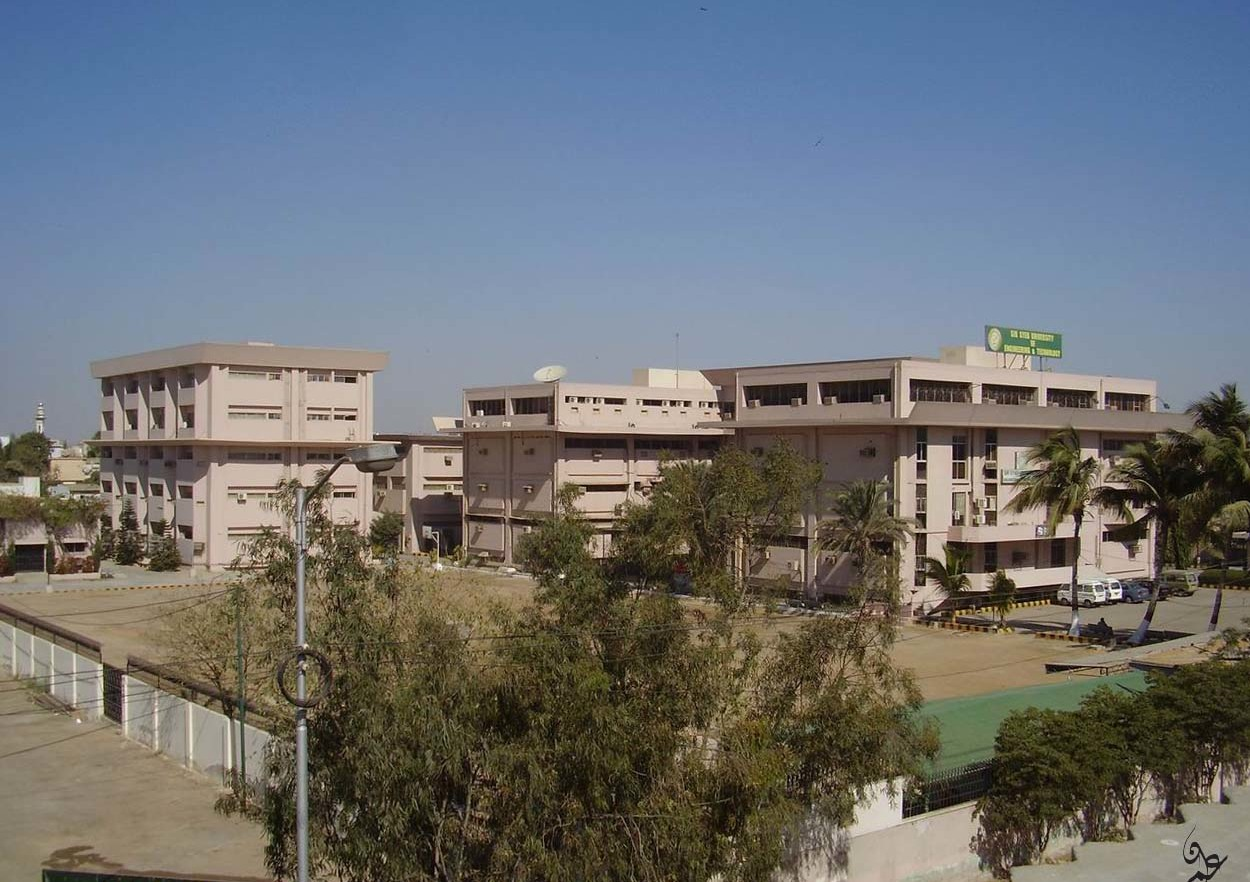
Sir Syed University of Engineering and Technology, Karachi

Sir Syed University of Engineering and Technology (Urdu: دانشگاہِ سرسید برائے علومِ مہندسی و فنونِ سائنسی) (known as "SSUET") is a private research university located in the urban area of Karachi, Sindh, Pakistan. The university is honored in the name of notable 19th-century Indian Muslim reformer and philosopher, Sir Syed Ahmad Khan.

== History ==
Sir Syed University of Engineering and Technology is based on the heritage of Sir Syed Ahmed Khan and of the Aligarh Movement. An education and social reformer, Sir Syed emerged on the scene in the sub-continent towards the middle of the 19th century. In the spirit of the Aligarh Movement, AMUOBA (Aligarh Muslim University Old Boys Association) focused attention on furthering education in Pakistan, especially science and technology. An achievement in this field has been the establishment of Sir Syed University of Engineering and Technology (SSUET). SSUET came into being on 8 October 1993, and its Charter formalities were completed by an Act passed by the Sindh Assembly on 17 September 1995. The founder of this university is Z.A. Nizami.

== Affiliated institution ==
- Aligarh Institute of Technology (AIT)

== Academic profile ==
SSUET provides degrees in 11 disciplines.

=== Undergraduate program ===
The university offer undergraduate programs in various disciplines for BS and BSc, leading to a bachelor's degree.

==== Faculty of Electrical and Computer Engineering (FOECE) ====
- BS in Biomedical Engineering
- BS in Biomedical Sciences
- BS in Biotechnology
- BS in Computer Engineering
- BS in Electrical Engineering
- BS in Electronic Engineering
- BS in Telecommunication Engineering
- BS in Mobile Communication and Security
- BSc in Electrical Engineering Technology
- BSc in Electronic Engineering Technology

==== Faculty of Computing and Applied sciences (FOCAS) ====
- BS in Bioinformatics
- BS in Computer Science
- BS in Information Technology
- BS in Software Engineering
- BS in Mathematics
- BS in Cloud Computing and Information Science's

==== Faculty of Civil Engineering and Architecture (FOCVA) ====
- Bachelor of Architecture
- BS in Civil Engineering
- BSc in Civil Engineering Technology

==== Faculty of Business, Management and Social sciences (FOBMS) ====
- Bachelor of Business Administration
- BA in Business Administration (2.5 Years Program, For 14 Years Degree Holders only)

=== Master's program ===
==== Faculty of Electrical and Computer Engineering (FOECE) ====
- MS Biomedical Engineering
- MS Computer Engineering
- MS in Electrical Engineering
- MS in Electronic Engineering
- MS Telecommunication Engineering

==== Faculty of Computing and Applied sciences (FOCAS) ====
- MS Computer Science
- MS in Software Engineering
- MS Mathematics

==== Faculty of Civil Engineering and Architecture (FOCVA) ====
- MS Civil Engineering

==== Faculty of Business, Management and Social sciences (FOBMS) ====
- Master of Business administration

=== Doctoral degree ===
- PhD Biomedical Engineering
- PhD Computer Engineering
- PhD in Electronic Engineering

SSUET has an Institute of Human Settlement and Environment specializing in Environmental Management Science.

== Recognized university ==
Higher Education Commission of Pakistan (HEC) places Sir Syed university at No. 12 in its rankings in the engineering category.

It is one of the leading universities in Karachi and is listed among the country's top universities in "engineering and technology" category by the Higher Education Commission of Pakistan, as of 2013. In addition, the university is also a member of the Association of Commonwealth Universities of the United Kingdom as well as the member of the International Association of Universities.

== Associations ==
- International Association of Universities
- Pakistan Engineering Council
- Higher Education Commission of Pakistan
- Association of Commonwealth Universities

== Student affairs ==
=== Online Classes ===
Sir Syed University of Engineering & Technology starts online classes in 2020.

=== Sport ===
The university has a sports ground in front of its main gate. This includes a basketball court, volleyball ground and cricket pitch for net practice. Steps for developing hockey and football grounds are in progress. A room contains equipment for health activities and body building.

Indoor games available are table tennis and badminton.

Outdoor games available are cricket, athletic track, soccer field, hockey, basketball and volleyball.

Ahmad Ali Rafi Ahmad S/O Major (R) Rafi uddin Ahmad was one of the brilliant athlete that Sir Syed University has produced. He has many national and international awards under his belt and was named the best sports man of the period from 2004 - 2008.

=== Music ===
The university has always promoted extra curricular activities and Musical events are arranged yearly in which opportunities are given to the students who are good in Singing and Music.

Syed Muhammad Umer S/O Major Syed Basith is one of the prominent names in Pakistan's Music Industry who has graduated from Sir Syed University of Engineering and Technology and throughout his tenure in University he was famous for his Musical/Guitars and Singing Skills. Imran Butt, the vocalist of F&I has also graduated from this university as electronic engineer.

=== Student Societies ===
Sir Syed university of engineering & technology has a Literary Art & Cultural forum (SSULACF) formerly known as Brig. Qamarussalam Forum. In this forum extra curricular activities are to be carried out. e.g. debates, Qira'at, Naat, Speeches, Quizzes Musical events & other positive creative activities

==== IEEE SSUET Student Branch ====
Institute of Electrical and Electronics Engineers (IEEE) recently opened its student branch in Sir Syed University of Engineering and Technology. The IEEE SSUET Student Branch is responsible for organizing IEEE related seminars along with other technical and non-technical workshops in the university. According to their website, the goal of IEEE SSUET Student Branch is to bring students closer to the latest development that is being made in the field of science and technology and to groom students to be motivated and bring out the best in them to help reshaping the future. IEEE SSUET Student Branch consists of five sub-branches: IEEE SSUET Computer Society, IEEE SSUET EMB Society, IEEE Power and Energy Society, IEEE Robotics and Automation Society, and the recently inaugurated IEEE Women in Engineering Society.

== Career planning and placement ==
The Career Planning and Placement Bureau is aimed at establishing liaison between the engineers/graduates and employers, and provides internships go-ahead forms only to organizations. The objective is to have a department that sets a platform to provide job opportunities for students and employees for the firms, so far the resources at disposable are rudimentary and great amount of efforts and dedication is needed to fulfill its responsibilities which should include :

- Counseling and guidance
- Career planning of students
- Placement services
- Arrangements for visits of delegates/prospective employers
- Projects collaboration
- Research collaboration
- Higher education of counseling
- Collaboration with professional bodies
- Industrial tours
- and workshops
- Exhibitions
- Internship
- Higher education of counseling

== Festivals and Events ==
=== Academic events ===
- SSUET Job fair
- Flyover dedication
- Foundation stone laying ceremony
- International Forum For Researchers
- 2nd International student convention Lahore

=== Sports events ===
- Seminar: State of sports in Pakistan
- NED Inter University cricket tournament, 2016
- Jashn-e-Azadi cricket tournament
- Ceremony of Astro Truff
- Sports Gala 2018
- HEC zone G Hockey championship 2018–19
- HEC zone G Interuniversity volleyball championship, 2018–19
- Pakistan day tug of war championship

=== Miscellaneous events ===
- SSUET new campus' tree plantation drive at education city
- Global Women Entrepreneur
- Forum on Pakistani and European Construction Industry
- Aligarh Muslim University Old Boys’ Association held AGM

== Future campus ==
The second campus of SSUET (200 acres) is planned to be developed in Education City, Karachi. The development of the campus has been delayed and currently in progress.

== Notable alumni ==
- Sajid Ahmed, Member of National Assembly of Pakistan and leader of Muttahida Qaumi Movement – Pakistan
- Abdul Haseem Khan International Hockey Player, (Pakistan Hockey Federation)
