= Kafilur Rahman Nishat Usmani =

Indian Muslim jurist

Mawlānā, Mufti Kafilur Rahman Nishat Usmāni

Personal life
- Born: 5 March 1942 Deoband, United Provinces, British India
- Died: 1 August 2006 (aged 64)
- Resting place: Qasmi cemetery
- Notable work: Urdu translation of Fatawa 'Alamgiri
- Education: Darul Uloom Deoband, Aligarh Muslim University
- Relatives: Usmani family of Deoband

Religious life
- Religion: Islam

Kafīlur Rahmān Nishāt Usmānī (5 March 1942 – 1 August 2006) was an Indian Muslim scholar, jurist, and a poet who served as a Mufti of Darul Uloom Deoband. He was the grandson of Azizur Rahman Usmani. He was an alumnus of Darul Uloom Deoband and the Aligarh Muslim University. He translated Fatawa 'Alamgiri into the Urdu language and issued more than fifty thousand religious edicts.

== Biography ==
Kafīlur Rahmān Nishāt Usmānī was born into the Usmani family of Deoband on 5 March 1942. His father was Jalilur Rahmān Usmānī, one of the sons of Azizur Rahman Usmani and a teacher of "tajwid" and "qirat" in the Darul Uloom Deoband.

Usmānī graduated from Darul Uloom Deoband in 1961 and received an M.A in Arabic from the Aligarh Muslim University in 1975. His teachers include Syed Fakhruddin Ahmad, Muhammad Tayyib Qasmi, and Mahdi Hasan Shahjahanpuri. In 1392 AH, Usmāni was appointed as a Mufti in the Darul Uloom Deoband. He served in this role for 32 years, during which time he issued more than fifty thousand religious edicts. He was also a poet and wrote in the ghazal, hamd, naat, nazm, marsiya, and qasīda genres of Urdu poetry.

Usmānī died on 1 August 2006 and was buried in Qasmi cemetery next to the grave of his grandfather Azizur Rahman Usmani. His funeral prayer was led by his elder brother Fuzailur Rahman Hilal Usmani.

== Literary works ==
Usmānī wrote books including his poetic collection, Shanāsa (transl. Acquaintance), Ziyārat-e-Quboor (transl. Visiting the graves), Hayāt Ibn Abbās (transl. Biography of Ibn Abbas), Hayāt Salmān Fārsi (transl. Biography of Salman the Persian), Hayāt Abu Hurairah (transl. Biography of Abu Hurairah), Sirāj al-Īdāh (Urdu commentary to Hasan Shurunbulali's Nur ul Idāh) and Ā'īna-e-Bid'at (transl. A Mirror Look of religious innovations).

Usmānī translated and annotated number of books concerning "dars-e-nizami" from Arabic and Persian into the Urdu language. The Arabic-Urdu translations include Sirāj al-Ma'āni, Sirāj al-Wiqāya (Urdu translation and commentary to Sharh-ul-Wiqāya), Sirāj al-Matālib, Tafhīm al-Muslim (Urdu translation and commentary to Shabbir Ahmad Usmani's Fath al-Mulhim), and Fatawa 'Alamgiri. The Persian-Urdu translations include Gulzār-e-Dabistān, Tuhfat al-Muwahhidīn, Masā'il Arba'īn, and Rubāʿiyāt of Baha' al-Din Naqshband.
