= Mahdi Hasan Shahjahanpuri =

Indian mufti and scholar of Hadith (1882–1976)

Mufti Mahdi Hasan Shahjahanpuri

Head Mufti of Darul Uloom Deoband
- In office 1948–1967
- Preceded by: Izaz Ali Amrohi
- Succeeded by: Mahmood Hasan Gangohi

Personal life
- Born: Khwaja Hasan; 2 May 1882 Shahjahanpur, North-Western Provinces, British India (now Uttar Pradesh, India)
- Died: 28 April 1976 (aged 93) Shahjahanpur, Uttar Pradesh, India
- Main interest(s): Hadith, Rijal, Fiqh
- Notable work(s): Qala'id al-Azhār, Al-la'ali al-Masnoo'ah fī al-Riwāyāti al-Marjoo'ah, Rijāl-u-Kitab al-Athar, Ad-Durr as-Samīn
- Education: Madrasa Aminia; Darul Uloom Deoband
- Occupation: Islamic scholar

Religious life
- Religion: Islam
- Denomination: Sunni Islam
- Jurisprudence: Hanafi
- Creed: Maturidi
- Movement: Deobandi

Senior posting
- Teacher: Kifayatullah Dehlawi
- Students: Mufti Abdul Razzaq; Kafilur Rahman Nishat Usmani; Saeed Ahmad Palanpuri; Arshad Madani
- Influenced by: Rashid Ahmad Gangohi; Mahmud Hasan Deobandi; Khalil Ahmad Saharanpuri; Anwar Shah Kashmiri; Anwar Shah Kashmiri

Mahdi Hasan Shahjahanpuri (1882–1976), also known as Mufti Mehdi Hasan and Mahdi Hasan Gilani Qadri, was an Indian Islamic scholar and mufti. He served as grand mufti at Darul Uloom Deoband for twenty years. He was an alumnus of Madrasa Aminia and Darul Uloom Deoband. He was a student of Mahmud Hasan Deobandi and Kifayatullah Dehlawi. Along with jurisprudence, he also had access to hadith and biographical evaluation. His literary works include Rijāl-u-Kitāb al-Āthār, Sharh-u-Balāghāt-i-Muhammad Fī Kitāb al-Āthār, Al-la'ali al-Masnoo'ah fī al-Riwāyāti al-Marjoo'ah, and a critical commentary on certain ideas of Ibn Hazm in the Science of Hadith entitled As-Sayf al-mujalla 'ala al-Muḥalla. He has done research and commentary work on Muhammad al-Shaybani's two books, Kitab al-Hujjah Alā Ahl al-Madīnah and Kitab al-Āthār.

== Early life and education ==
Mahdi Hasan Shahjahanpuri was born on 2 May 1882, (Rajab 1300 AH) in Mullakhel, Shahjahanpur. His ancestors had settled in India from Baghdad. (Note: His genealogy is as follows: Mahdi Hasan bin Syed Kazim Hasan bin Syed Fazlullah bin Syed Muhibullah Shah bin Syed Qutbuddin bin Syed Darwaish bin Syed Shahabuddin Ahmad Shah Shahabadi bin Syed Abu Ishaq Ibrahim bin Syed Shahabuddin Ahmad Shah Gilani. Among his ancestors, Abu Ishaq Ibrahim came to Delhi from Baghdad in the reign of Shah Jahan and returned to Baghdad after nine years. He again came to India and died in Aurangabad, Deccan. Then his son Syed Ahmad came to Delhi from Baghdad in the reign of Alamgir in 1090 AH, settled in Shahabad, died, and was buried there. His grave is a special and common place of pilgrimage there.)

He memorized the Quran from his father, Syed Kazim Hasan, at the age of about twelve. He received his primary education in Arabic and Persian from his father and elder brother, then at Madrasa Ainul Ilm in his city, where he was taught by Sheikh Abdul Haq (an authorized disciple of Rashid Ahmad Gangohi) and Kifayatullah Dehlawi. When Dehlawi was moved to Madrasa Aminia, Delhi, he was sent to Madrasa Aminia by his father, where he received further education in Dars-e-Nizami from Dehlawi and other teachers and graduated in 1908 AD (1326 AH).

He obtained permission (Ijazah) for hadith narration from Mahmud Hasan Deobandi by reading parts of Sahih al-Bukhari and Jami' al-Tirmidhi in front of him, and he was also granted the turban of proficiency in the convocation held at Darul Uloom Deoband in 1910 AD (1328 AH). He also received Ijazah in Hadith from Khalil Ahmad Saharanpuri, and Anwar Shah Kashmiri.

He pledged allegiance to Rashid Ahmad Gangohi in Tariqah and was authorized by Shafiuddin Makki, an authorized disciple of Gangohi.

== Career ==
After graduating from education, Kifayatullah Dehlawi sent Shahjahanpuri to Madrasa Ashrafia in Rander, Surat, where he continued to teach Kutub al-Sittah and perform ifta services for seven years. Then he performed the duties of teaching Kutub al-Sittah for four years as the principal of Madrasa Muhammadia in Rander. Between 1920 and 1947 AD (1338 and 1366 AH), he worked as a mufti in Bombay province.

In 1948 AD (1367 AH), he was appointed as Head Mufti of the Dar-ul-Ifta at Darul Uloom Deoband, and he held this position for about twenty years. In 1967 AD (1387 AH), due to his long illness and weakness, he retired from Darul Uloom Deoband and went to his homeland, Shahjahanpur. During his presidency, 75,324 fatwas were issued from the Dar-ul-Ifta of Darul Uloom Deoband. Muhammad Tayyib Qasmi reported the number of these fatwas at 133752.

Throughout his stay at Darul Uloom Deoband, he continued to teach Al-Tahawi's Sharh Ma'ani al-Athar. His notable students included Mufti Abdul Razzaq, Kafilur Rahman Nishat Usmani, Saeed Ahmad Palanpuri, and Arshad Madani.

He was also an Urdu and Arabic poet, and he learned from Husain Ahmad Miyan Bebak, a student of Daagh Dehlvi.

== Literary works ==
Shahjahanpuri has done twenty years of research on the book Kitab al-Hujjah Alā Ahl al-Madīnah by Muhammad al-Shaybani in four volumes; similarly, he has also done research on al-Shaybani's book Kitab al-Āthār in three volumes. Besides these, he authored and compiled about 28 books in Arabic and Urdu, including:

- Qalā'd al-Azhār (a two-volume commentary on Imām Muḥammad's recension of Imām Abū Ḥanīfah's Kitāb al-Āthār.)
- Rijāl-u-Kitāb al-Āthār
- Sharh-u-Balāghāt-i-Muhammad Fī Kitāb al-Āthār
- Ad-Duur as-Samīn
- Al-Ihtidā’-u-Fī Radd al-Bidʿah
- Sharh Nukhbat-ul-Fikr (in Urdu; unpublished)
- As-Sayf al-mujalla 'ala al-Muḥalla (a critical commentary on certain ideas of Ibn Hazm in the Science of Hadith in four volumes.)
- Al-la'ali al-Masnoo'ah fī al-Riwāyāti al-Marjoo'ah

== Death ==
Shahjahanpuri died on 28 April 1976 (Rabi' al-Thani 28, 1396 AH) in Shahjahanpur and was buried there.

Religious titles
Preceded by Izaz Ali Amrohi	Head Mufti of Darul Uloom Deoband; 1948 - 1967	Succeeded by Mahmood Hasan Gangohi
