= Muhammad Hamidullah =

Indian Islamic scholar (1908–2002)

Personal life
- Born: 19 February 1908 Hyderabad, Hyderabad State, British India
- Died: 17 December 2002 (aged 94) Jacksonville, Florida, United States
- Era: Modern era
- Main interest(s): Islamic law, international Law, Quranic tafsir and hadith
- Notable idea(s): Evolution of Islamic, international Law
- Education: Jamia Nizamia, Osmania University, Bonn University, Sorbonne University

Religious life
- Religion: Islam
- Denomination: Sunni
- School: Shafi‘i

Muslim leader
- Teacher: Manazir Ahsan Gilani, Abul Wafa Al Afghani
- Influenced: Contemporary Islamic philosophy

Muhammad Hamidullah (19 February 1908 – 17 December 2002) was an Islamic scholar from the princely state of Hyderabad. He wrote dozens of books and hundreds of articles on Islamic science, history and culture.

== Early life and education ==
Hamidullah was born in Hyderabad, the capital city of Hyderabad State, (now Hyderabad, Telangana, India) the youngest amongst three brothers and five sisters. Both his great-grandfather and his grandfather were Islamic scholars who authored commentaries on the Quran.

Hamidullah's father Mufti Abu Mohammad Khalilullah, was a scholar of Islamic jurisprudence, a director of revenue in the government of the Nizam of Hyderabad, and a pioneer in establishing an interest-free banking system in Hyderabad.

Hamidullah obtained the degree of Maulawi Kamil with distinction from Madrasah Nizamiyah, followed by a BA, LLB and MA in international law from Osmania University. He then travelled to Germany and was awarded a D.Phil. by Bonn University in 1932. After serving in the faculty of Bonn as a lecturer in Arabic and Urdu for a short time, he registered at Sorbonne University in France for his second doctorate. He was awarded D.Litt. by the university after 11 months. He taught international law at Osmania University between 1936 and 1946.

== Career ==
In 1948, Hamidullah was appointed by the Nizam as a representative of Hyderabad at the United Nations. Following India's annexation of Hyderabad in 1948, Hamidullah rejected both Pakistani and Indian citizenship. Classed as a Refugee of Hyderabad by the French Government, he lived in exile in Paris. Hamidullah was a research fellow at the French National Centre for Scientific Research from 1954 until he retired in 1978. He also gave regular lectures at Turkish universities during this time.

He is known for his contributions to the research of Hadith, translating the Quran into multiple languages, and for his biography of the Islamic prophet Muhammad in French.

Hamidullah received the Hilal-i-Imtiaz award from the government of Pakistan in 1985. He donated the award's prize money to the Islamic Research Academy at the International Islamic University in Islamabad.

== Later life and death ==
In 1996, Hamidullah moved to Jacksonville, Florida in the United States of America. He died on 17 December 2002.

== Literary works ==
Having "authored over 100 books in English, French, German, Arabic and Urdu, and about 1000 scholarly essays and articles on the various aspects of Islam and related areas", Muhammad Hammidullah's notable publications include :

- The Muslim Conduct of State: Being a Treatise on Siyar (Siyar), General Introduction (1941, 1953)
- The First Written Constitution in the World (1941, 1975 and 1986)
- Islamic Notion of Conflict of Laws (1945)
- Die Rezeption Europaischen Rechts in Haiderabad (1953)
- Le "Livre des genenalogies" [D'al-Baladuriy by al-Baladuri] (1954)
- Introduction to Islam (from 1957 onwards in numerous languages besides English)
- Le Saint Coran: Traduction et commentaire de Muhammad Hamidullah avec la collaboration de M. Leturmy (from 1959 onwards)
- Muhammad Ibn Ishaq, the Biographer of the Holy Prophet (Pakistan Historical Society) (1967)
- Muhammad Rasulullah: A Concise Survey of the Life and Work of the Founder of Islam (1979)
- Islam: A General Picture (1980)
- Islam, Philosophy and Science: Four Public Lectures Organized By Unesco June 1980 (editor) (1981)
- Why Fast?: Spiritual & Temporal Study of Fast in Islam (Centre Culturel Islamique Paris Series) (1982)
- The Prophet's Establishing a State and his Succession (1988)
- The Prophet of Islam: Prophet of Migration (1989)
- Kurʼân-ı Kerîm tarihi: Bir deneme (Ilmi eserler) (1991)
- Battlefields of the Prophet Muhammad (1992)
- Emergence of Islam (1993)
- Islam in a Nutshell (1996)
- The Life and Work of the Prophet of Islam (1998)
- The Prophet Establishing a State (1986)

== See also ==
- Contemporary Islamic philosophy
- International Islamic University, Islamabad Dr. Hamidullah Library
