= Nizamettin =

Nizamettin is the Turkish version of the Muslim name Nizam al-Din. It may refer to:

- Nizamettin Arıç (born 1956), Kurdish singer
- Nizamettin Çalışkan (born 1987), Turkish footballer
- Nizamettin Erkmen (1919 - 1990), Turkish politician
- Nizamettin Tas (born 1961), Turkish military commander
