= Fatawa 'Alamgiri =

Islamic edict book

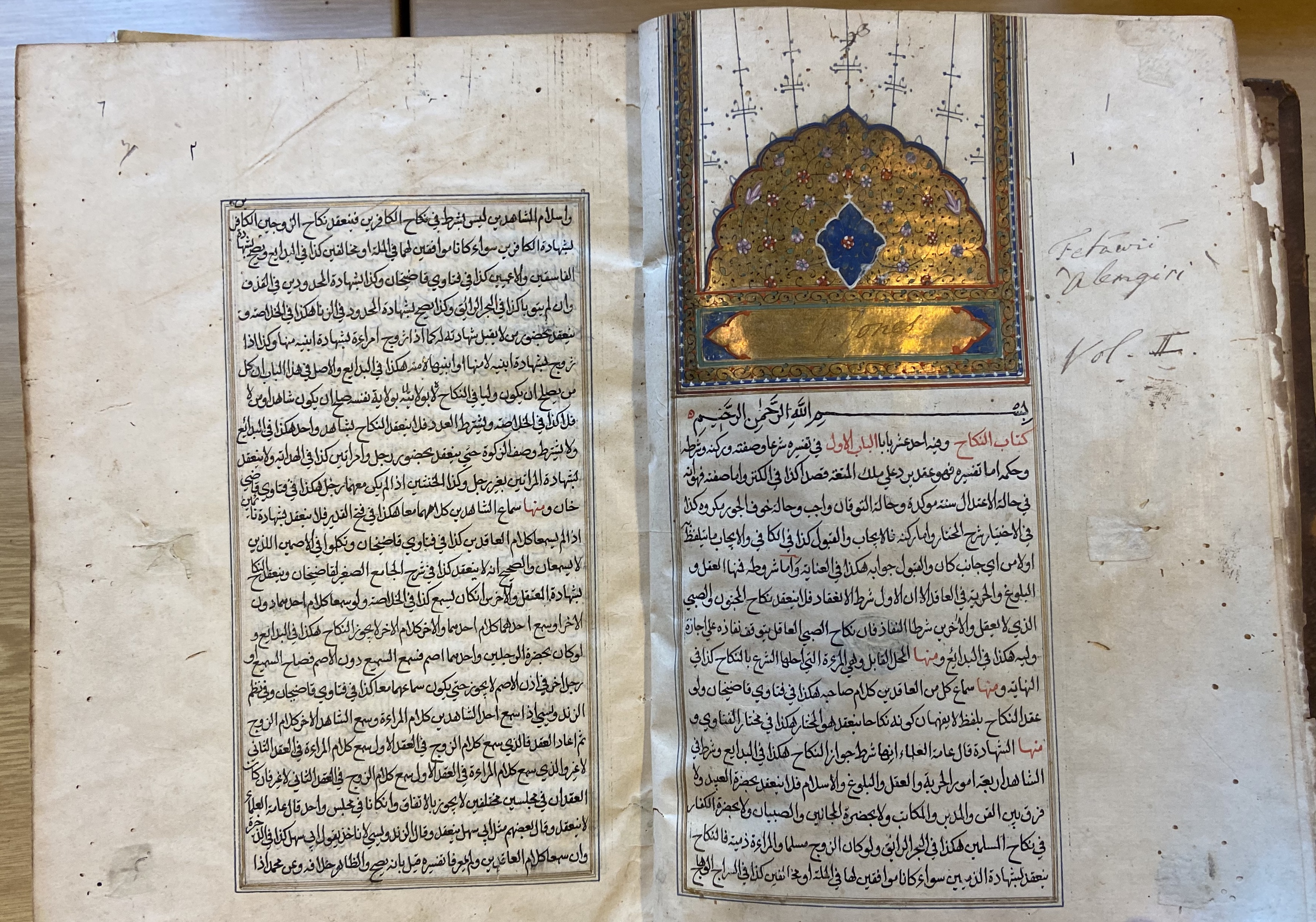
- Manuscript of the Fatawa 'Alamgiri
- Author: 500 prominent Islamic scholars
- Language: Arabic and Persian
- Genre: Islamic law (Hanafi)
- Publisher: Emperor Aurangzeb
- Publication date: 1672

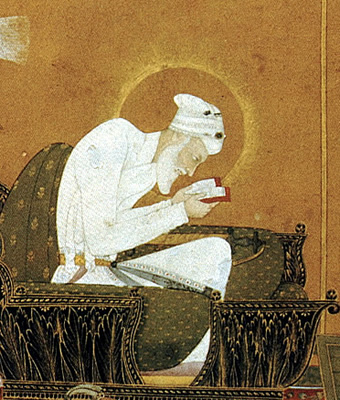
Emperor Aurangzeb reading Quran

Fatawa 'Alamgiri, also called Al-Fatawa al-Hindiyyah (Arabic: الفتاوى الهندية; lit. 'Fatwa of India'), Fatawa Hindiyyah, Fatawa-e-Alamgiri or Al-Fatawa al-'Alamkiriyyah (Arabic: الفتاوى العالمكيرية; lit. 'Fatwa of the Alamgir'), is a 17th-century sharia based compilation on statecraft, general ethics, military strategy, economic policy, justice and punishment, that served as the law and principal regulating body of the Mughal Empire, during the reign of the Mughal emperor Muhammad Muhiuddin Aurangzeb Alamgir. It subsequently went on to become the reference legal text to enforce sharia in colonial South Asia in the 18th century through early 20th century, and has been heralded as "the greatest digest of Muslim law during the Mughal India".

== Outline ==
Fatawa-e-Alamgiri was the work of many prominent scholars from different parts of the world, including Hejaz, principally from the Hanafi school. In order to compile Fatawa-e-Alamgiri, emperor Aurangzeb gathered 500 experts in Islamic jurisprudence, 300 from South Asia, 100 from Iraq and 100 from the Hejaz. Shaikh Nizam, a celebrated lawyer from Lahore was appointed the chairman of the commission which would compile the Fatawa-e-Alamgiri. The years long work of these scholars resulted in an Islamic code of law for South Asia, in the late Mughal Era. It consists of legal code on personal, family, slaves, war, property, inter-religious relations, transaction, taxation, economic and other law for a range of possible situations and their juristic rulings by the faqīh of the time.

The collection comprises verses from the Qur'an, supplemented by hadith narratives, including those of Sahih al-Bukhari, Sahih Muslim, Sunan Abu Dawood and Sahih at-Tirmidhi.

The Fatawa is notable for several reasons:

- It spanned 30 volumes originally in various languages, but is now printed in modern editions as 6 volumes
- It provided significant direct contribution to the economy of South Asia, particularly Bengal Subah, waving the proto-industrialization.
- It served as the basis of judicial law throughout the Mughal Empire
- It created a legal system that treated people differently based on their religion

In substance similar to other Hanafi texts, the laws in Fatawa-i Alamgiri describe, among other things, the following:

=== Criminal and personal law ===
- Personal law for South Asian Muslims in the 18th century, their inheritance rights,
- Personal law on gifts,
- Apostates neither have nor leave inheritance rights after they are executed,
- The guardian of a Muslim girl may arrange her marriage with her consent,
- A Muslim boy of understanding, requires the consent of his guardian to marry.
- Laws establishing the paternity of a child arising from valid or invalid Muslim marriages,
- A Muslim man with four wives must treat all of them justly, equally and each must come to his bed when he so demands,
- Hudud punishments for the religious crime of zina (pre-marital, extra-marital sex) by free Muslims and non-Muslim slaves. It declared the punishment of flogging or stoning to death (Rajm), depending on the status of the accused i.e. Stoning for a Married (Muhsin) person (free or unfree), and as for the non-Muhsin, a free person will get one hundred stripes and a slave will get fifty if they self confess.

=== Pillage and Slavery ===
- If two or more Muslims, or persons subject to Muslims, who enter a non-Muslim controlled territory (properties of non-combatants are excluded) for the purpose of pillage (seizing booties of the fighters) without the permission of the Imam, and thus seize some property of the inhabitants there, and bring it back into the Muslim territory, that property would be legally theirs.”
- Plundering and pillaging of residential areas is forbidden in Islam.
- The right of Muslims to purchase and own slaves.
- A Muslim man's right to have sex with a captive slave girl he owns.
- No inheritance rights for slaves.
- The testimony of all slaves was inadmissible in a court of law.
- Slaves require permission of the master before they can marry.
- An unmarried Muslim may marry a slave girl owned by another but a Muslim married to a Muslim woman may not marry a slave girl.
- Conditions under which the slaves may be emancipated partially or fully.

=== Office of Censor ===
The Fatwa-e-Alamgiri also formalized the legal principle of Muhtasib, or office of censor that was already in use by previous rulers of the Mughal Empire. Any publication or information could be declared as heresy, and its transmission made a crime. Officials (kotwal) were created to implement the Sharia doctrine of hisbah. The offices and administrative structure created by Fatawa-e-Alamgiri aimed at Islamisation of South Asia.

== Development ==
The Fatawa-e-Alamgiri (also spelled Fatawa al-Alamgiriyya) was compiled in the late 1672, by 500 Muslim scholars from Medina, Baghdad and in the Indian Subcontinent, in Delhi (India) and Lahore (Pakistan), led by Sheikh Nizam Burhanpuri. It was a creative application of Islamic law within the Hanafi fiqh. It restricted the powers of Muslim judiciary and the Islamic jurists ability to issue discretionary fatwas. It is compiled in eight years between 1664 and 1672. Ahmet Özel from Atatürk University has reported in his work on TDV İslâm Ansiklopedisi, el-alemgiriyye, that Fatawa-e-Alamgiri has spread fast to Anatolia during Aurangzeb rule due to the promotions of travellers, scholars, and officials.

As the power shifted from Muslim rulers in India to the British, the colonial authorities decided to retain local institutions and laws, to operate under traditional pre-colonial laws instead of introducing secular European common law system. Fatawa-i Alamgiri, as the documented Islamic law book, became the foundation of legal system of India during Aurangzeb and later Muslim rulers. Further, the English-speaking judges relied on Muslim law specialist elites to establish the law of the land, because the original Fatawa-i Alamgiri (Al-Hindiya) was written in Arabic. This created a social class of Islamic gentry that zealously guarded their expertise, legal authority and autonomy. It also led to inconsistent interpretation-driven, variegated judgments in similar legal cases, an issue that troubled British colonial officials.

The assumption of the colonial government was that the presumed local traditional sharia-based law, as interpreted from Fatawa-i Alamgiri, could be implemented through common law-style law institution with integrity. However, this assumption unravelled in the 2nd half of the 19th century, because of inconsistencies and internal contradictions within Fatawa-i Alamgiri, as well as because the Aurangzeb-sponsored document was based on Hanafi Sunni sharia. Shia Muslims were in conflict with Sunni Muslims of South Asia, as were other minority sects of Islam, and they questioned the applicability of Fatawa-i Alamgiri. Further, Hindus did not accept the Hanafi sharia-based code of law in Fatawa-i Alamgiri. Thirdly, the belief of the colonial government in "legal precedent" came into conflict with the disregard for "legal precedent" in the Anglo-Muhammadan legal system which emerged during the Company period, leading colonial officials to distrust the Maulavis (Muslim religious scholars). The colonial administration responded by creating a bureaucracy that created separate laws for Muslim sects, and non-Muslims such as Hindus in South Asia. This bureaucracy relied on Fatawa-i Alamgiri to formulate and enact a series of separate religious laws for Muslims and common laws for non-Muslims (Hindus, Buddhists, Jains, Sikhs), most of which were adopted in independent India after 1947.

The British tried to sponsor translations of Fatawa-i Alamgiri. In the late 18th century, at the insistence of the British, the al-Hidaya was translated from Arabic to Persian. Charles Hamilton and William Jones translated parts of the document along with other sharia-related documents in English. These translations triggered a decline in the power and role of the Qadis in colonial India. Neil Baillie published another translation, relying on Fatawa-i Alamgiri among other documents, in 1865, as A Digest of Mohummudan Law. In 1873, Sircar published another English compilation of Muhammadan Law that included English translation of numerous sections of Fatawa-i Alamgiri. These texts became the references that shaped law and jurisprudence in colonial India in late 19th and the first half of the 20th century, many of which continued in post-colonial India, Pakistan and Bangladesh.

== Contemporary comments ==
Burton Stein states that the Fatawa-i-Alamgiri represented a re-establishment of Muslim ulama prominence in the political and administrative structure that had been previously lost by Muslim elites and people during Mughal Emperor Akbar's time. It reformulated legal principles to expand Islam and Muslim society by creating a new, expanded code of Islamic law.

Some modern historians have written that British efforts to translate and implement Sharia from documents such as the Fatawa-e Alamgiri had a lasting legal legacy during and in post-independence India (Pakistan, India, Bangladesh and Sri Lanka).

According to Jamal Malik, the document stiffened the social stratification among Muslims and broke from the consensus of Hanafi Law. He argues certain punishments reified the established categories: it introduced that Muslim nobles such as Sayyids were exempt from physical punishments, (Note: However Hadd (scripturally proscribed) punishments applied to all subjects regardless of status and could not be modified by the Judge.) the governors and landholders could be humiliated but not arrested nor physically punished, the middle class could be humiliated and put into prison but not physically punished, while the lowest class commoners could be arrested, humiliated and physically punished. The emperor was granted powers to issue farmans (legal doctrine) that overruled fatwas of Islamic jurists.

Mona Siddiqui notes that while the text is called a fatawa, it is actually not a fatwa nor a collection of fatwas from Aurangzeb's time. It is a mabsūts style, furu al-fiqh-genre Islamic text, one that compiles many statements and refers back to earlier Hanafi sharia texts as justification. The text considers contract not as a written document between two parties, but an oral agreement, in some cases such as marriage, one in the presence of witnesses.

== Translation ==
In 1892, Bengali scholar Muhammad Naimuddin published a four-volume Bengali language translation of the Fatawa ʿAlamgiri with the assistance of Wajed Ali Khan Panni and the patronage of Hafez Mahmud Ali Khan Panni, the Zamindar of Karatia. Kafilur Rahman Nishat Usmani, a Deobandi jurist translated the Fatawa 'Alamgiri into Urdu language.

== See also ==
- Law of India
- Muslim personal law
- History of Indian law
- Anglo-Hindu law
- Fatawa-e-Razvia
- Delhi Sultanate
- Khums
- Qisas
- Radd al-Muhtar
- Bada'i' al-Sana'i'
