= Hazrat Nizamuddin (disambiguation) =

Hazrat Nizamuddin or Nizamuddin Auliya (1238–1325) was a Sufi saint of India from Delhi.

Hazrat Nizamuddin may also refer to these places associated with him:

- Nizamuddin Dargah, his dargah (mausoleum) in Delhi
  - Hazrat Nizamuddin Ki Baoli, a baoli or stewell at the dargah, see Stepwell#Delhi
- Nizamuddin East, a neighbourhood in Delhi
  - Hazrat Nizamuddin railway station, a railway station in Delhi in the Nizamuddin locality
- Nizamuddin West, a neighbourhood in Delhi
- Hazrat Nizamuddin metro station, of the Delhi metro
- Sarai Kale Khan Nizamuddin metro station, of the Delhi metro

== See also ==
- Nizam al-Din (disambiguation)
