= Nizamabad, Punjab =

Town in Punjab, Pakistan

Nizamabad
- Town
- Location within Pakistan
- Coordinates: 32°25′46″N 74°07′09″E
- Country: Pakistan
- Province: Punjab
- Time zone: UTC+5 (PST)

Nizamabad (Urdu: نظام آباد) is a small town near Wazirabad in Gujranwala District, Punjab, Pakistan. It is about a kilometer from Wazirabad towards Lahore. Its distance to Gujranwala and Lahore is 40 km and 100 km, respectively.

Nizamabad has many manufacturers of cutlery, which mainly provide raw material for bigger industries in Wazirabad. Nizamabad has a girls college and a school for primary education.

== See also ==
- Wazirabad
