= Nezami Qunavi =

Turkish poet (born 1435–1440)

Neẓāmi Qunavi, Neẓāmi of Konya or Neẓāmi Qaramāni was a poet writing in Persian, Arabic, and Turkish. He was born between 1435 and 1440, the son of Mollā Wali-al-Din, a well-known preacher and master of a religious order in Konya.
