= Nezamabad, Eqlid =

Nezamabad نظام اباد
- Village
- Location within Iran
- Coordinates: 30°42′27″N 52°35′22″E
- Country: Iran
- Province: Fars
- County: Eqlid
- Bakhsh: Central
- Rural District: Khonjesht

Population (2006)
  - Total: 1,275
- Time zone: UTC+3:30 (IRST)
  - Summer (DST): UTC+4:30 (IRDT)

Nezamabad (Persian: نظام اباد, also Romanized as Nez̧āmābād; also known as Nizāmābād) is a village in Khonjesht Rural District, in the Central District of Eqlid County, Fars province, Iran. At the 2006 census, its population was 1,275, in 267 families.
