= Nazemabad, Kurdistan =

Nazemabad ناظم آباد
- Village
- Location within Iran
- Coordinates: 35°06′23″N 47°58′21″E
- Country: Iran
- Province: Kurdistan
- County: Qorveh
- Bakhsh: Chaharduli
- Rural District: Chaharduli-ye Gharbi

Population (2006)
  - Total: 396
- Time zone: UTC+3:30 (IRST)
  - Summer (DST): UTC+4:30 (IRDT)

Nazemabad (Persian: ناظم آباد, also Romanized as Nāz̧emābād; also known as Tāzehābād and Tāzehābād-e Dīzaj) is a village in Chaharduli-ye Gharbi Rural District, Chaharduli District, Qorveh County, Kurdistan Province, Iran. At the 2006 census, its population was 396, in 97 families. The village is populated by Kurds.
