= Nazemabad, East Azerbaijan =

Nazemabad ناظم اباد
- Village
- Location within Iran
- Coordinates: 38°27′00″N 47°17′00″E
- Country: Iran
- Province: East Azerbaijan
- County: Ahar
- Bakhsh: Central
- Rural District: Qeshlaq

Population (2006)
  - Total: 250
- Time zone: UTC+3:30 (IRST)
  - Summer (DST): UTC+4:30 (IRDT)

Nazemabad (Persian: ناظم اباد, also Romanized as Nāz̧emābād) is a village in Qeshlaq Rural District, in the Central District of Ahar County, East Azerbaijan Province, Iran. At the 2006 census, its population was 250, in 58 families.
