= Alvis 12/50 =

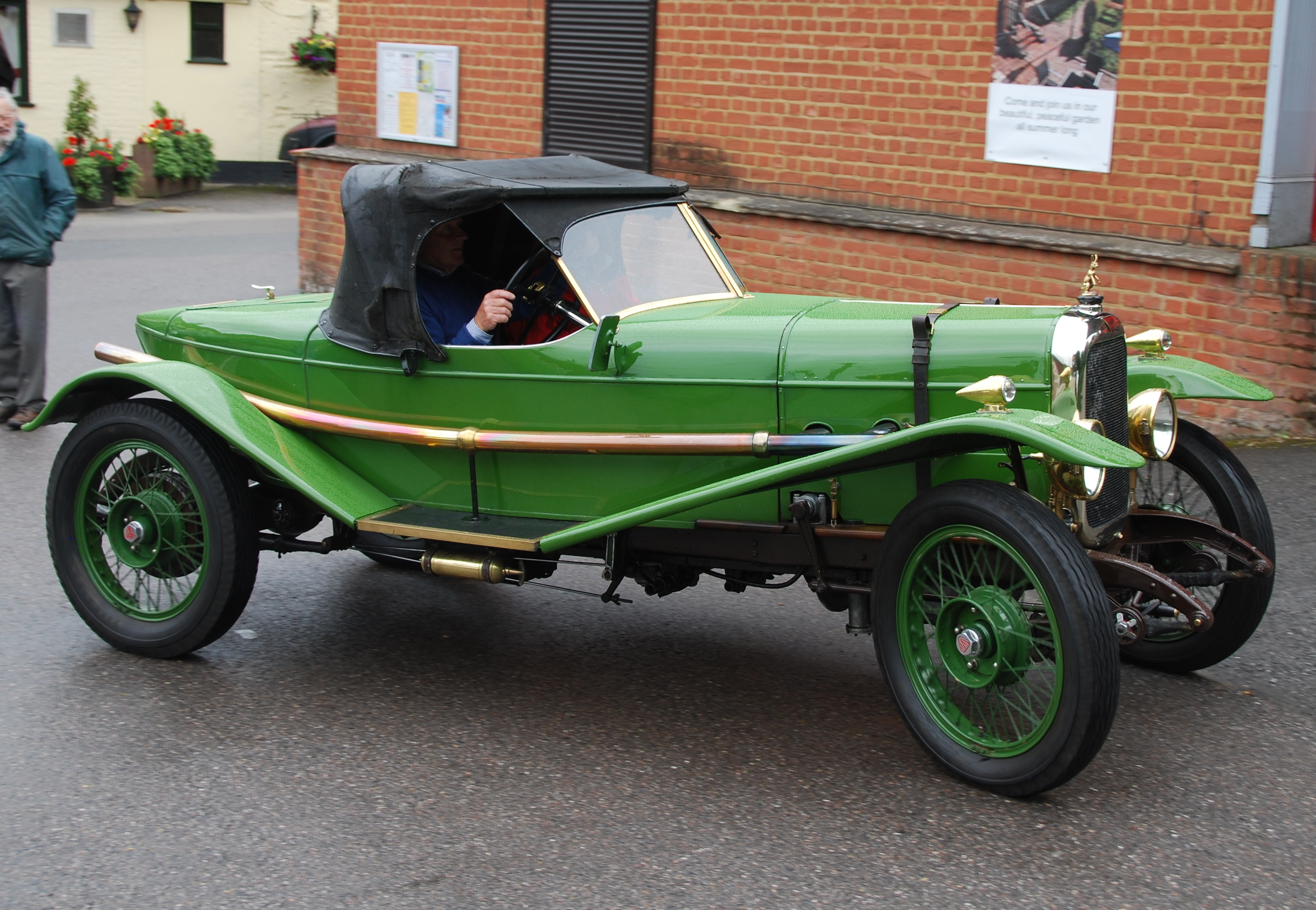
- SA, 2-seater 'duck's back' body by Carbodies, despatched November 1923

Overview
- Manufacturer: Alvis
- Production: 1923–1932; 3,705 made

Powertrain
- Engine: 1,496, 1,598 or 1,645 cc Straight-4 overhead valve

Dimensions
- Wheelbase: SA: 108.5 in (2,756 mm); others: 112 in (2,845 mm)
- Length: 153 in (3,886 mm) to 158 in (4,013 mm)
- Width: 60 in (1,524 mm)

Chronology
- Predecessor: Alvis 10/30

The Alvis 12/50 is a car introduced by British business Alvis Car and Engineering Company Ltd in 1923. It went through a series of versions, with the last ones being made in 1932. A range of factory bodies (made by Carbodies and Cross & Ellis) could be specified in two- or four-seat form, with either open or closed bodies.

== The subframe cars ==
=== SA and SB ===
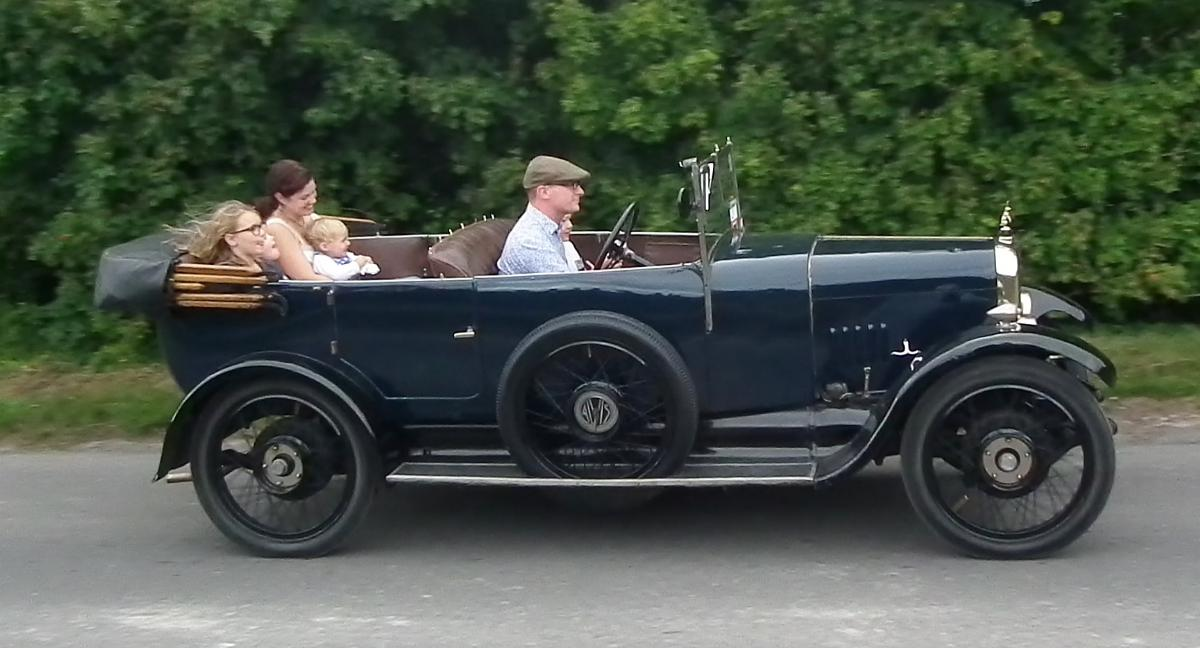
SB, 5-seater tourer by Cross & Ellis, registered June 1924

The first 12/50s were produced in late 1923 for the 1924 model year. The cars from this first year of production were designated SA and SB. The SA had a 1496 cc four-cylinder overhead valve engine in a chassis with a wheelbase of 108.5 in (2,756 mm), while the SB had a wheelbase of 112.5 in (2,858 mm). The SB was initially fitted with the 1496 cc engine, but after the introduction of a 1598 cc version of the OHV engine this became the standard fitment. The engines of these early cars were carried in a subframe bolted to the relatively slender ladder chassis. The SA usually carried two-seat bodywork, typically the Super Sports 2/3-seater nicknamed "duck's back" because of its pointed rear end, said to resemble that of a duck. The majority of SB cars carried Super Sports four-seater bodywork, but a good number were also fitted with touring bodies from the standard Alvis range. The SA and SB 12/50s were built with (twin shoed) brakes on the rear wheels only. All the 12/50s had a four speed non-synchromesh gearbox with right hand change. The clutch was a fabric-faced aluminium cone. The cars were right hand drive.

=== SC ===
The SC arrived in Autumn 1924 for the 1925 model year with the larger 1598 cc engine as standard (though the 1496 cc unit could be specified for sporting use). Most SC 12/50s were built on the longer chassis, which would be standard for the 12/50 until the end of production. Front wheel brakes were offered as an option on this model: a front axle of new design could be supplied with or without brakes. Power transmission was via a roller-bearing prop shaft of new design.

== The 12/50 redesigned ==
=== TE and TF ===
The 12/50 was redesigned for the 1926 model year. From Autumn 1925 a new stronger chassis was used for the TE, which had its engine (now built around a redesigned crankcase) enlarged again to 1645 cc, and the TF of the same year with a short stroke version of the same engine, displacing 1496 cc. A single-plate clutch replaced the previous cone type, and this was fitted with a clutch-stop to facilitate upward changes. For these and all subsequent 12/50s the engine was bolted directly to the flange-frame chassis, dispensing with the subframe of previous models. From the TE and TF models onwards four-wheel brakes were fitted as standard, single-shoe drums on the rear replacing the double-shoe drums of the previous model. The TE and was superseded for the 1927 model year by the TG. Confusingly, the short-stroke TF was replaced in the 1927 range by a car with an 'S' prefix: the SD.

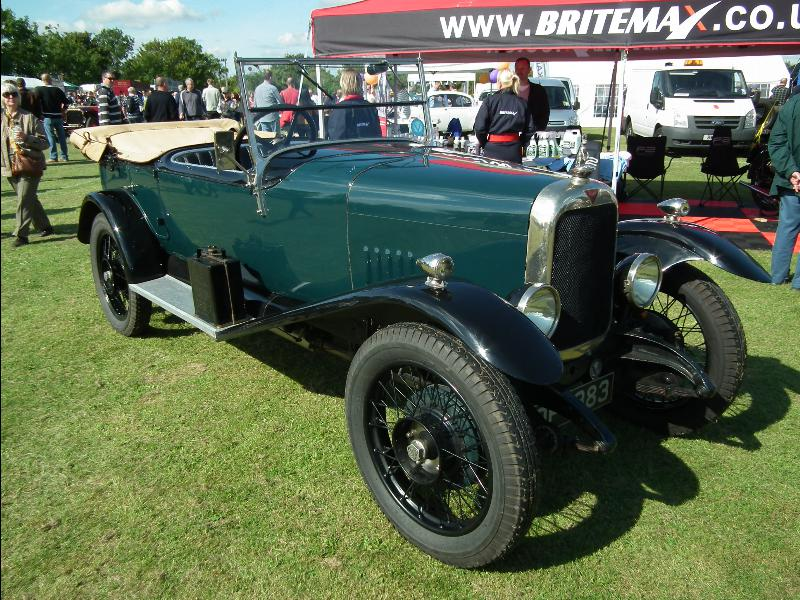
TE, Sports Tourer by Cross & Ellis, despatched August 1926

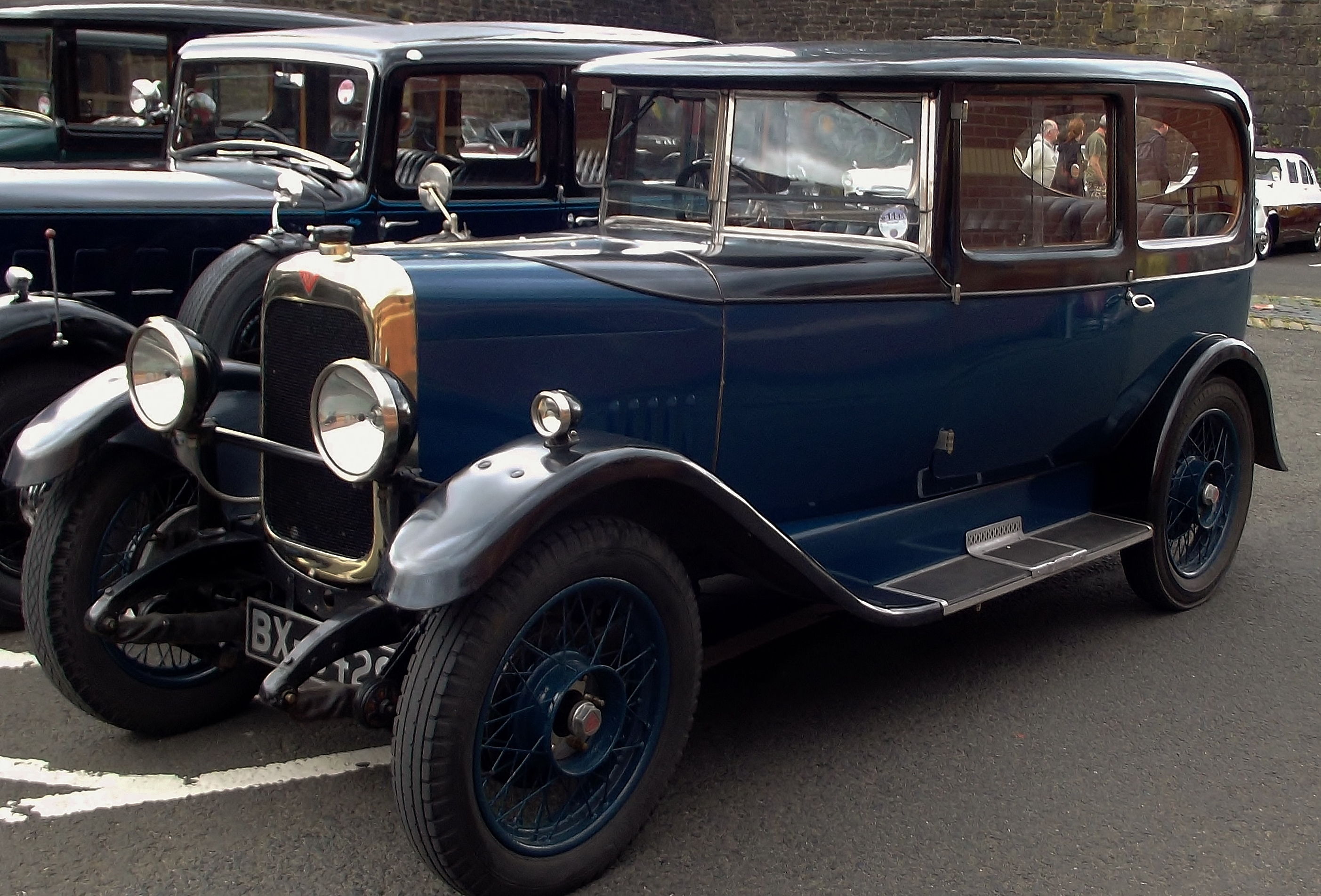
TG, Sportsman's Saloon by Carbodies, despatched January 1928

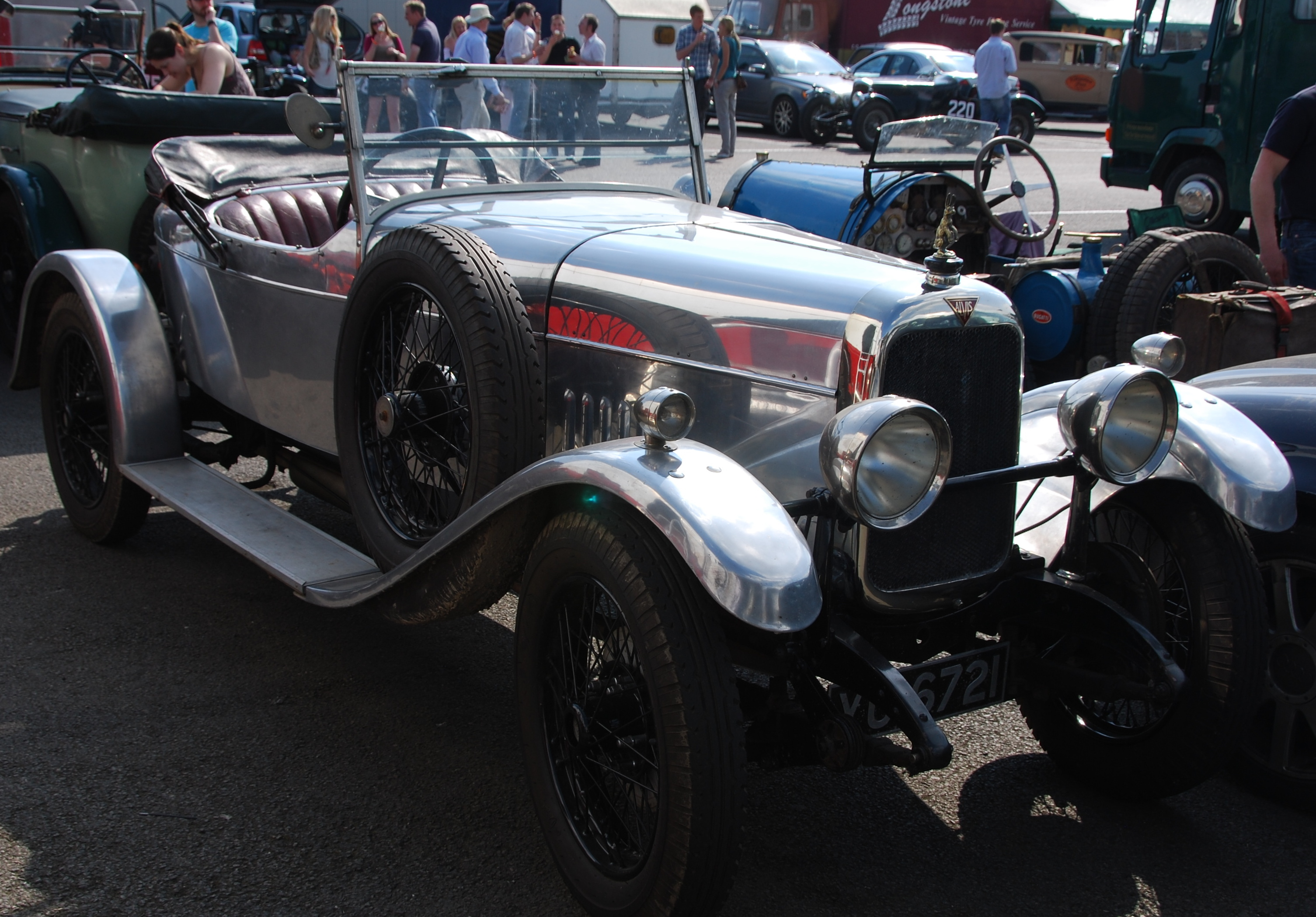
SD, two-seater 'beetle back' by Carbodies, despatched September 1927

=== TG, TH and SD ===
The TG was the standard 'touring' model, while the SD - powered by the 1496 cc engine, now fitted with a large-port cylinder head - satisfied the needs of the sporting motorist. Also available in this year was the TH, which had the gearbox and rear axle ratios of the 'touring' TG, but the sub-1500 cc engine of the SD. The TG and SD models were available until 1929. The TG and (very rare) TH models can be recognised by their taller radiators, with a noticeably deeper top section. Cars from the 1928 and 1929 model years also sported higher-set lamps, with horizontal crossbar, in accordance with the fashion of the time.

== The post-vintage years ==
=== TJ ===
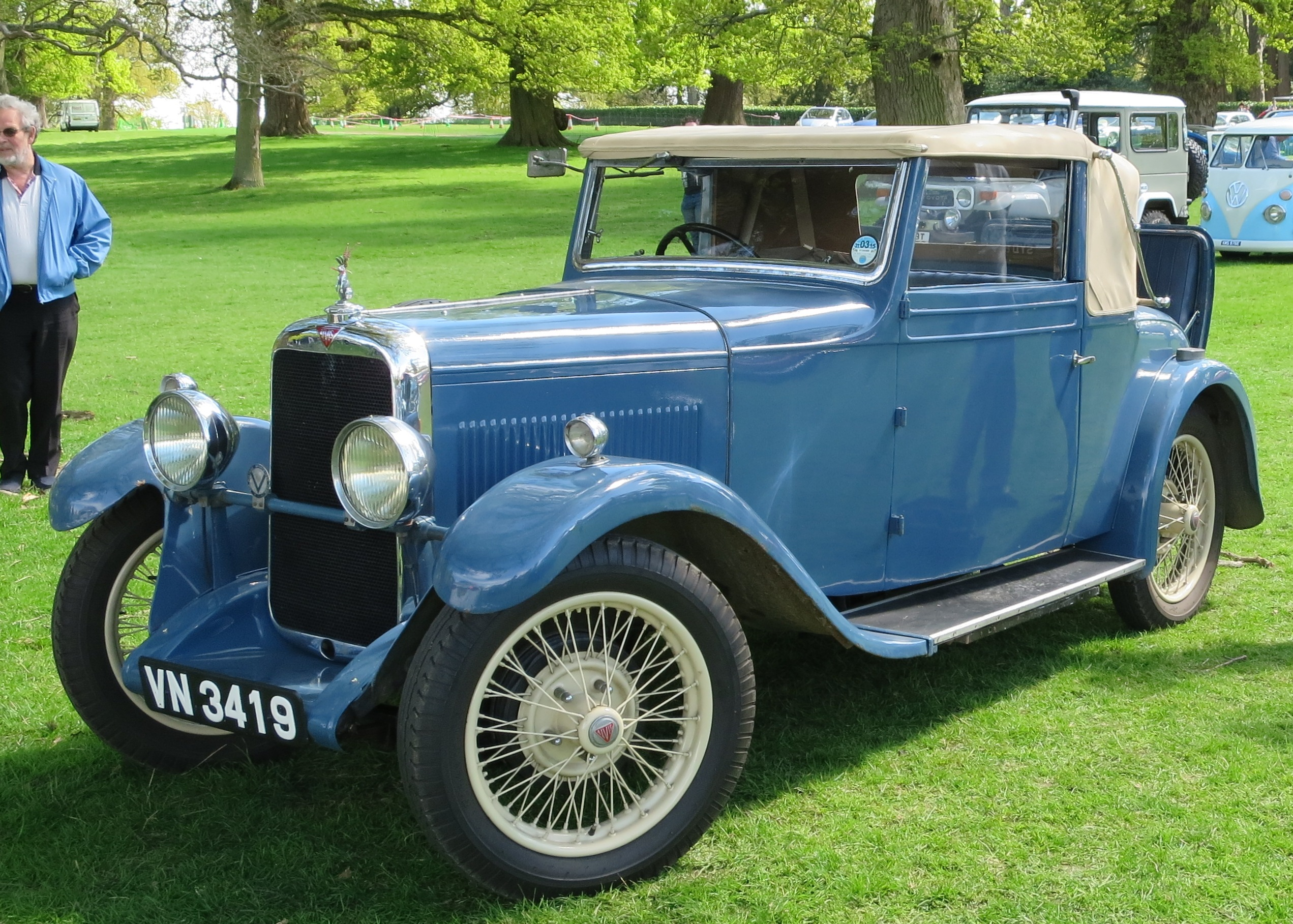
TJ, drophead coupe by Carbodies, registered January 1932

The 12/50 was withdrawn between 1929 and 1930 when the company decided that the future lay with the front-wheel drive FD and FE models, but when these did not reach the hoped for volumes a final version of the 12/50 was announced for the 1931 model year as TJ. Fitted with the 1645 cc engine this continued in production until 1932.

The 'post-vintage' TJ is referred to by Alvis historians as being from the 'revival period', and it differs from its predecessor in a number of ways, notably coil instead of magneto ignition, deep chromed radiator shell, and rear petrol tank in place of the scuttle-mounted tank on most older 12/50s.

The TJ was joined in the range by a more sporting version of the same chassis, but this car was marketed not as a 12/50, but as the 12/60. The TK 12/60 was available in 1931, and the TL 12/60 in 1932.
