= Jamia Nizamia =

Islamic seminary in Hyderabad, India

- Type: Islamic seminary
- Established: 1876; 150 years ago
- Founders: Anwarullah Farooqui
- Affiliation: Sunni Islam
- Chancellor: Mufti Khaleel Ahmed
- Vice-Chancellor: Mohammed Saif Ullah
- Location: Hyderabad, Telangana, India; 17.36040°N 78.46469°E
- Campus: Urban
- Website: www.jamianizamia.org

Grand Mufti of Palestine Shaykh Ekrima Sa'id Sabri at Jamia Nizamia

Jamia Nizamia more properly, Jami'ah Nizamiyyah, is one of the oldest Islamic seminaries of higher learning for Muslims located in Hyderabad, India.

== History ==
It was founded by Anwarullah Farooqui, honorifically known as Fadilat Jung (the title was bestowed upon him by the Nizam), in Hyderabad in 1876. It flourished under the patronage of the Nizam of Hyderabad, Mir Osman Ali Khan. It is located in the Hussaini alam area of today's old city, Hyderabad.

Over the last 146 years the Jamia has preserved the understanding of Islam and its sciences by the means of unbroken chains of Islamic authorization, viz, the Ijazah and the Isnad, which go back fourteen centuries to tie the institution and its scholars to Muhammad. It was mainly known due to the scholarly works accomplished by the faculty of the Jamia Nizamia in the late 19th and 20th centuries that the Hyderabad served as a major hub of academic activities for the sub-continent. The Jamia constitutes a major part of Islamic history in the sub-continent, particularly, the Deccan.

== Organisation ==
Jamia Nizamia has not the status of a university or deemed to be university according to the Indian University Grants Commission Act of 1956 and, therefore, can not confer or grant degrees. According to the Jamia Nizamia website, their "Moulvi", "Alim", "Fazil" and "Kamil" are recognized by Osmania University as equivalent to degrees in oriental languages such as B.A.L. and M.A.L. After passing exams in English language prescribed for B.A., Fazil-passed students can be given admission to M.A. at Osmania University. Although previously the students would only be given admission into the Faculty of Oriental Languages at Osmania University, in 2022, Fazil certified graduates can directly gain admission into the MA Arabic, Faculty of Arts at Osmania University. Further recognizing universities would be Aligarh Muslim University, Al-Azhar of Egypt, Jamia Umm al-Qura of Mecca, the Islamic University of Madinah and the University of Kuwait The Jamia set up the Girls College in 1995.

Arabic language students found employment in Arabic call centers in the last years, and student enrollment at Jamia Nizamia soared from 500 to 1,300 between 2004 and 2007.

The Jamia Nizamia budget in 2004–2005 was 97,72,000.00 INR (US$220,000), expenditure in 2004–2005 was 1,41,56,000 INR (US$31,5000 in 2004).

== Research ==
The scholars of Jamia Nizamia researched and published around 1000 books including rare Arabic Manuscripts which are the essential books for Islamic knowledge. The project was mainly accomplished under the auspices of another research institute known as the Dairatul Ma'arif an-Nizamiyyah or Dairat al- Ma'arif al-Uthmaniyyah. The graduates of Jamia Nizamia established the Lajnah Ihya al-Ma'arif an-Nu'maniyyah which enabled them to advance research and publish Arabic manuscripts pertaining to the Hanafi fiqh, in particular, and Islamic legal theories in general.

== Fatwa ==
A fatwa is basically a ruling on a point of Islamic law given by a qualified jurist in response to a question posed by a private individual, judge or government to him.

The jurists also answer questions asked weekly by subscribers to the Siasat and the Etemaad Daily in print, and fatwas are available through email. In 2003–2004, fatwa fees earned 40,000.00 INR.

Fatwas covered a wide range of topics:

- 2000: In 2000, a fatwa banned Muslim actors like (Shabana Azmi) from performing "acts of polytheism" (such as puja) on screen and asked them to denounce themselves being Muslims if they can't follow it.
- 2005: In another fatwa, the Jamia Nizamia had absolved qazis from responsibility for data such as age, previous marriages that is entered on the nikahnama forms in relation to the bride.
- 2005: In October 2005, Jamia Nizamia issued a fatwa calling suicide bombings Un-Islamic.
- 2007: A fatwa was issued in 2007 against the state government's move to provide reservations or quotas to Muslims in education and employment on the basis of caste system.
- 2022: A fatwa was issued by Jamia Nizamia in September 2022, stated that Islamic punishment for blasphemy cannot be administered in a democratic, non-Islamic country like India. Legal avenues must be explored and no individual has right to enforce this Islamic punishment. The fatwa stated that enforcing Sharia penalties is the exclusive domain of Islamic countries.

== Notable alumni ==
- Abul Wafa al-Afghani, former Shaykh Ul Fiqh of Jamia Nizamia and Founder of Ihya Al Ma’arif An Nomaniya
- Muhammad Hamidullah, Islamic scientist, translator of the Qur'an in French and Muslim jurist
- Abdul Halim Chishti Nomani, Pakistani Islamic scholar and librarian

== See also ==
- List of Islamic educational institutions
- Al-Azhar Al-Sharif
- International Islamic University Malaysia
- Mazahir Uloom
- Darul Uloom Waqf
- Al Jamiatul Ashrafia
- Darul Uloom Deoband
- Jamiatur Raza
- Darul Uloom Nadwatul Ulama
- Al-Jame-atul-Islamia
- Markazu Saqafathi Sunniyya
- Manzar-e-Islam
- Ma'din
- Umm al-Qura University
