= Nezamabad-e Jadid =

Nezamabad-e Jadid نضام ابادجديد
- Village
- Location within Iran
- Coordinates: 28°31′51″N 53°35′14″E
- Country: Iran
- Province: Fars
- County: Jahrom
- Bakhsh: Central
- Rural District: Jolgah

Population (2006)
  - Total: 2,404
- Time zone: UTC+3:30 (IRST)
  - Summer (DST): UTC+4:30 (IRDT)

Nezamabad-e Jadid (Persian: نضام ابادجديد, also Romanized as Nez̧āmābād-e Jadīd; also known as Nez̧āmābād) is a village in Jolgah Rural District, in the Central District of Jahrom County, Fars province, Iran. At the 2006 census, its population was 2,404, in 533 families.
