= Nizam (name) =

Nizam or Nezam is both a given name and a surname. It is derived from the Arabic word نِظَام niẓām, meaning "order, system", often by way of Persian. Notable people with the name include:

== Given name ==
- Nizam Bai (1643–1692), Mughal princess consort
- Nezam Hafiz (1969–2001), Guyanese-born American cricketer
- Hairul Nizam Hanif (born 1979), Malaysian footballer
- Sikandar Lodi (1458–1517), born Nizam Kahn, Sultan of Delhi
- Saiful Nizam Miswan (born 1981), Malaysian footballer
- Ahmad ibn Nizam al-Mulk (died 1149/50), Persian vizier
- Nizam al-Mulk (1018–1092), Persian scholar and vizier
- Tuan Nizam Muthaliff (1966–2005), Sri Lankan military intelligence officer
- Nizam al-Din Nishapuri (died 1328/29), Persian mathematician and poet
- Nazim Pasha (1848–1913), Chief of Staff of the Army of the Ottoman Empire
- Nizam Peerwani, American medical examiner
- Burhan Nizam Shah I (1503–1553), ruler of the Ahmednagar Sultanate
- Burhan Nizam Shah II (died 1595), ruler of the Ahmednagar Sultanate
- Hussain Nizam Shah I (1565–??), ruler of the Ahmednagar Sultanate
- Murtaza Nizam Shah III, Sultan of Ahmadnagar
- Nizam al-Din Yahya (1417–1480), the Mihrabanid malik of Sistan

== Surname ==
- Ahmed Nizam (born 1986), Indian cricketer
- Khairul Nizam (born 1991), Singaporean footballer
- Mohamed Nizam (born 1974), Maldivian footballer
- Musa Nizam (born 1990), Turkish footballer
- Naem Nizam (born 1965), Bangladeshi newspaper editor
- Sarwar Jahan Nizam (1952–2025), Chief of Staff of the Bangladesh Navy
- Sheen Kaaf Nizam (born 1947), Urdu poet
- Zaiful Nizam (born 1987), Singaporean footballer
