= Nezamabad, Arsanjan =

Nezamabad نظام اباد
- Village
- Location within Iran
- Coordinates: 29°43′25″N 53°17′24″E
- Country: Iran
- Province: Fars
- County: Arsanjan
- Bakhsh: Central
- Rural District: Shurab

Population (2006)
  - Total: 518
- Time zone: UTC+3:30 (IRST)
  - Summer (DST): UTC+4:30 (IRDT)

Nezamabad (Persian: نظام اباد, also Romanized as Nez̧āmābād) is a village in Shurab Rural District, in the Central District of Arsanjan County, Fars province, Iran. At the 2006 census, its population was 518, in 119 families.
