= Nazmabad, Rudbar-e Jonubi =

Nazmabad نظم اباد
- Village
- Location within Iran
- Coordinates: 27°59′00″N 58°25′35″E
- Country: Iran
- Province: Kerman
- County: Rudbar-e Jonubi
- Bakhsh: Jazmurian
- Rural District: Kuhestan

Population (2006)
  - Total: 100
- Time zone: UTC+3:30 (IRST)
  - Summer (DST): UTC+4:30 (IRDT)

Nazmabad (Persian: نظم اباد, also Romanized as Naz̧mābād) is a village in Kuhestan Rural District, Jazmurian District, Rudbar-e Jonubi County, Kerman Province, Iran. At the 2006 census, its population was 100, in 20 families.
