= Nezamabad, Darab =

Nezamabad نظام اباد
- Village
- Location within Iran
- Coordinates: 28°27′59″N 55°04′16″E
- Country: Iran
- Province: Fars
- County: Darab
- Bakhsh: Rostaq
- Rural District: Rostaq

Population (2006)
  - Total: 105
- Time zone: UTC+3:30 (IRST)
  - Summer (DST): UTC+4:30 (IRDT)

Nezamabad (Persian: نظام اباد, also Romanized as Nez̧āmābād) is a village in Rostaq Rural District, Rostaq District, Darab County, Fars province, Iran. At the 2006 census, its population was 105, in 21 families.
