= Zujajat al-Masabih =

Compendium of Hadith (Hanfi Mishkaat)

Zujajat al-Masabih (Arabic: زجاجة المصابیح, romanized: Zujājat al-Maṣābīḥ) is a Sunni Islamic compendium of hadiths that supports the Sunni Hanafi school of thought. The book is compiled into five volumes and contains a total of 6634 Ahadith. Authored by Abd Allah Shah Naqshbandi Alaihirrahmah (an Islamic scholar from Hyderabad, India), the Zujajat was first published in 1960.

The book is modeled on the pattern and structure of Mishkat al-Masabih by Al-Tabrizi. The Mishkat has a leaning towards the Shafi'i school of thought while Naqshbandi composed the Zujajat giving preference to Hanafi proofs. The five volumes have a total of 6634 Hadith.

The book has been translated into Urdu with commentary by Maulana Mohammed Muneeruddin, former Khateeb of Makkah Masjid and Mohammed Abdus Sattar Khan Naqshbandi, former Head of Arabic Department, Osmania University, Hyderabad, India. Later, the scholars of Jamia Nizamia took up the work of translation.

== Compilation ==
The book contains five volumes that have a total number of 6634 Hadith.

- The first volume is from: the Book of Faith to the Book of Fasts, it has 2564 Hadith.
- The second volume starts from: the excellence of the Holy Quran and ends with the book of freeing (slaves), Chapter of oaths, it has 1255 Hadith.
- The third volume starts with the Book of retribution and ends with the Book of dreams, it has 1170 Hadith.
- The fourth volume starts with the Book of manners and ends with the book of trials, it has 1093 Hadith.
- The fifth volume starts with the book of excellence of the Holy Prophet and ends with Excellence of this Ummah, it has 552 Hadith.

== See also ==
- Mufti Syed Ziauddin Naqshbandi
