= Nizam-ul-Mulk =

Nizam-ul-Mulk may refer to:

- Nizam al-Mulk (1018–1092), Persian scholar and vizier of the Seljuk Empire
- Nizam-ul-Mulk, Asaf Jah I (1671–1748), Mughal nobleman who founded the Hyderabad State in India
- Malik Hasan Bahri (died 1486), prime minister of the Bahmani Sultanate 1481–1486

== See also ==
- Nizam of Hyderabad, the title of the ruler of Hyderabad State, used from 1724 to 1948
- Nizam Ali Khan, Asaf Jah II, 5th Nizam of Hyderabad State
