= Nezamabad, Bardsir =

Nezamabad نظم اباد
- Village
- Location within Iran
- Coordinates: 29°57′51″N 56°33′58″E
- Country: Iran
- Province: Kerman
- County: Bardsir
- Bakhsh: Central
- Rural District: Mashiz

Population (2006)
  - Total: 36
- Time zone: UTC+3:30 (IRST)
  - Summer (DST): UTC+4:30 (IRDT)

Nezamabad (Persian: نظم اباد, also Romanized as Nez̧amābād, Nez̧āmābād, Naz̧mābād, and Naz̧mābād) is a village in Mashiz Rural District, in the Central District of Bardsir County, Kerman Province, Iran. At the 2006 census, its population was 36, in 8 families.
