= Nazmabad, Anbarabad =

Nazmabad نظم آباد
- Village
- Location within Iran
- Coordinates: 28°20′29″N 57°52′27″E
- Country: Iran
- Province: Kerman
- County: Anbarabad
- Bakhsh: Central
- Rural District: Jahadabad

Population (2006)
  - Total: 545
- Time zone: UTC+3:30 (IRST)
  - Summer (DST): UTC+4:30 (IRDT)

Nazmabad (Persian: نظم آباد, also Romanized as Naz̧mābād) is a village in Jahadabad Rural District, in the Central District of Anbarabad County, Kerman Province, Iran. At the 2006 census, its population was 545, in 111 families.
