= Z.A. Nizami =

Pakistani educationist (1931 - 2013)

- Born: Zilley Ahmed Nizami; 31 May 1931; Meerut, British India
- Died: 7 April 2013 (aged 81); Karachi, Pakistan
- Education: Aligarh Muslim University (Civil Engineering)
- Occupations: Educationist, Administrator
- Known for: Founder of Sir Syed University of Engineering and Technology, Director-General of Karachi Development Authority
- Spouse: (Deceased in 2012)
- Children: 5 sons, 1 daughter

Z.A. Nizami or Zilley Ahmed Nizami (31 May 1931 – 7 April 2013) was a Pakistani educationist and also the founder of the Sir Syed University of Engineering and Technology.

== Early life and career ==
Born on 31 May 1931, in Meerut, Uttar Pradesh, British India, Nizami also served as the director-general of now defunct Karachi Development Authority (KDA). He graduated from Aligarh Muslim University in India with a degree in civil engineering. Nizami migrated to Karachi, Pakistan in 1951. He was also the president of the Aligarh Muslim University Old Boys Association. As the director general of the KDA, he guided and took the city of Karachi through 45 schemes of modernization. Besides being a good town planner, one of his outstanding achievements was the founding and establishment of Sir Syed University of Engineering and Technology in 1994 in Karachi, Pakistan.

Later his skills, knowledge and expertise were used by the Government of Saudi Arabia in the expansion of Makkah and Madinah cities.

== Death and legacy ==
Z.A. Nizami died on 7 April 2013. Among his survivors were five sons and a daughter. His wife, a short story writer, had died in 2012.

On his death, a noted Pakistani educator Pirzada Qasim reportedly said, "Nizami Sahab's biggest achievement was setting up a quality university for which he had received the inspiration through his Aligarh education...The Aligarh University instilled in its students a strong sense of brotherhood and an urge to surpass each other in helping out somebody. I believe Nizami Sahab spent all his life under this positive influence."

In April 2017, an event was organized in Karachi to pay tributes to Z.A. Nizami where many professionals associated with him from all over Karachi attended and participated.
