= Alvis 10/30 =

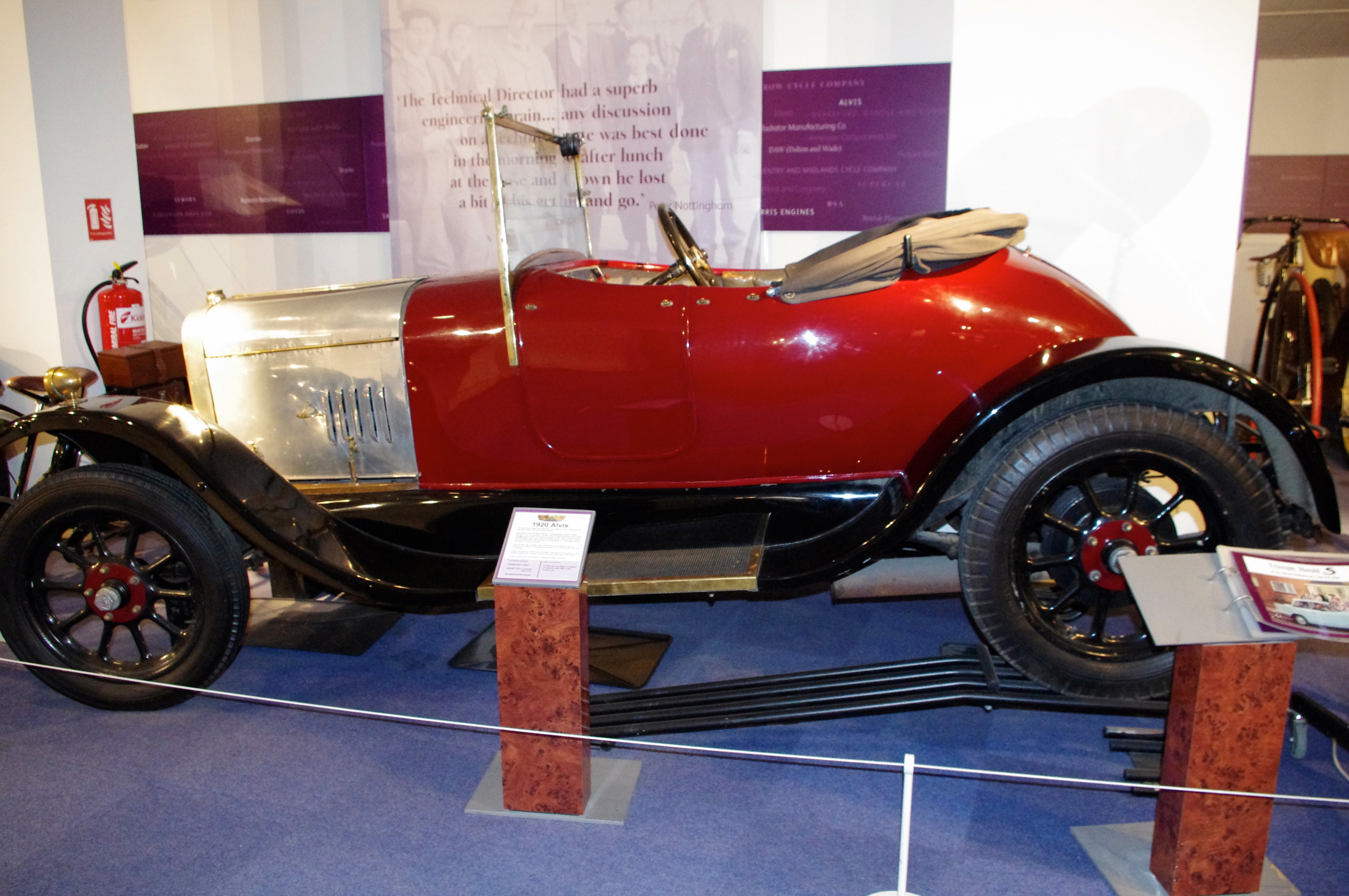
- 1920 Alvis 10/30

Overview
- Manufacturer: Alvis
- Production: 1920-1922; 770 made

Powertrain
- Engine: 1460 cc Straight-4

Dimensions
- Wheelbase: 110 in (2,794 mm) (SA) or 112 in (2,845 mm)
- Length: 153 in (3,886 mm) to 158 in (4,013 mm)

The Alvis 10/30 is a car introduced by British car maker Alvis Car and Engineering Company Ltd in 1920. It was the company's first production vehicle and was made until 1923. A range of body styles was available.

The car is powered by a water cooled, four cylinder 1460 cc four cylinder engine usually of the side valve type but some had overhead valves. The engine had a bore of 68mm and a stroke of 100mm. A Solex carburettor was used. This drove the rear wheels via a cone clutch and four speed gearbox. The chassis had rigid axles and half elliptic springs.

On the home market the car cost £450 in chassis form up to £470 with factory body.

A top speed of 60 mph (97 km/h) was claimed with the overhead valve Super Sports derivative said to be able to lap the Brooklands race track at 80 mph (130 km/h).

== Alvis 11/40 ==
In 1921 the car could be ordered with a larger 1598cc engine as the Alvis 11/40. The extra capacity was obtained by lengthening the stroke to 110mm. It was claimed to be able to reach 70 mph (110 km/h).

54 were made.

== Alvis 12/40 ==
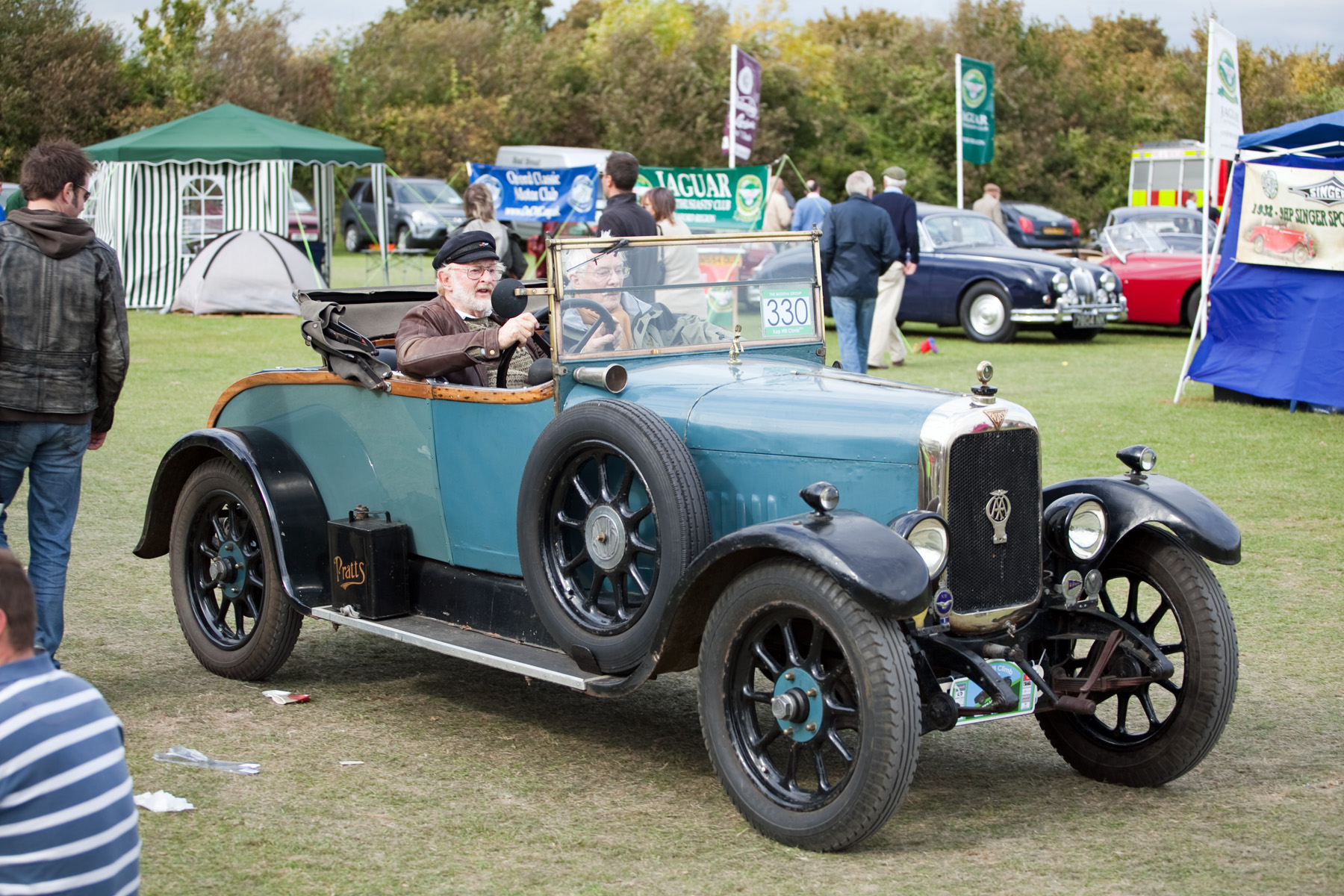
1923 Alvis 12/40

In 1922 the 11/40 was replaced by the 12/40 with the same engine but improved gearbox and rear axle. For the 1924 model year the 12/40 was designated 'TC', and for 1925 'TD'. The TD 12/40 was available with four-wheel brakes as an optional extra.

In 1923 the chassis cost £470 reducing to £375 in 1925.

It continued in production until Autumn 1925 by which time 1887 had been made.
