= Kitab al-Athar =

Hadith book by Muhammad al-Shaybani

- Author: Imam Muhammad Bin Hasan Al-Shaybani
- Original title: كتاب الآثار
- Language: Arabic
- Genre: Hadith collection

Kitab al-Athar (Arabic: كتاب الآثار), is one of the earliest Hadith books compiled by Imam Muhammad al-Shaybani (132 AH – 189 AH), the student of Imam Abu Hanifa. This book is sometimes attributed to Imam Abu Hanifa.

== Description ==
The book contains almost 1,000 hadiths according to Al-Maktaba Al-Shamela. It is one of the oldest Hadith book written. The book contains many Hadiths that connect directly to the Islamic prophet Muhammad while others are the narrations of Sahabas (companions of Muhammad). Some of its Hadiths also attributed to students of Sahabas.

== Publications ==
The book has been published by many organizations around the world:

- Al-Athar of Imam Abu Hanifah: Published: Turath Publishing (25 November 2006)
- Al-Athar. Edited and commented on by Abul Wafa al-Afghani. Hyderabad, India: Lajnat Iḥyāʾ al-Maʿārif al-Nuʿmāniyya, [Reprinted by Dār al-Kutub al-ʿIlmiyya, Beirut]

== See also ==
- List of Sunni books
- Kutub al-Sittah
- Sahih Muslim
- Jami al-Tirmidhi
- Sunan Abu Dawood
- Jami' at-Tirmidhi
- Either: Sunan ibn Majah, Muwatta Malik
