= Nizami, Goranboy =

Nizami
- Municipality
- Location within Azerbaijan
- Coordinates: 40°39′47″N 46°31′14″E
- Country: Azerbaijan
- Rayon: Goranboy

Population
  - Total: 1,430
- Time zone: UTC+4 (AZT)
  - Summer (DST): UTC+5 (AZT)

Nizami is a village and municipality in the Goranboy Rayon of Azerbaijan. It has a population of 1,430.
