= Madrasah as-Sawlatiyah =

Islamic school in Mecca, Saudi Arabia

- مدرسة الصولتية
- Mecca, Saudi Arabia

Information
- Other name: al-Sawlatiyya
- Type: Islamic school
- Founded: 1873
- Founder: Rahmatullah Kairanawi

Madrasah as-Sawlatiyah (Arabic: مدرسة الصولتية, Madrasah aṣ-Ṣawlatīyah; or abbreviation: "al-Sawlatiyya") is an Islamic school in Mecca, Saudi Arabia. It is the oldest continuing school in Saudi Arabia.

== History ==
Al-Sawlatiyya was founded in 1873 by Rahmatullah Kairanawi. Kairanawi had been appointed as a lecturer at the Masjid al-Haram by the Sheikh al-Ulama (Leading Scholar) Ahmad Zayni Dahlan. He started teaching and felt that lessons were delivered as sermons rather than planned academic lectures. He gathered with Indian Muslim immigrants and wealthy benefactors to establish an authentic Islamic Law School to teach the Islamic sciences through what he saw as a more sound curriculum.

The madrassah was established in 1290 hijrah (1874 CE) The major contributor was a woman of Calcutta by the name of Sawlat al-Nisa, on whose name the madrassah is named.

== Present day and legacy ==
The Madrassah is still in existence and has well-known alumni around the world.

According to historian Rosie Bsheer, the school represents a critical and under-explored history of anti-colonial intellectualism and politicization in Mecca that reached across continents and the Indian Ocean to other geographic locales. "Graduates of Sawlatiyya and other schools founded by Asian and African intellectuals in the city [Mecca] contributed to the intellectual, cultural, social and political life in the Arabian Peninsula and other parts of the world."

The Book Izhar ul-Haqq, written by the school's founder Ramatullah Kairanawi, was the main reason behind Ahmed Deedat's active interest in debates on Christianity.

Of the well known sources the Madrasah was founded by the Eminent Sheikh Haji Imdadullah Muhajir Makki Rahmatullahi Alayh and the donation was given by the said honorable lady who was a student of the Great Sheikh.
