= Imad ud-din Lahiz =

Indian Islamic scholar and Christian convert (1830–1900)

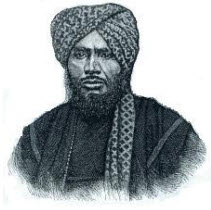
Imad ud-din Lahiz

Imad ud-din Lahiz (Urdu: عماد الدین لاہز) (1830–1900) was an Indian writer, preacher and Quranic translator, who converted to Christianity from Islam.

== Background ==
Imad ud-din Lahiz was among the fourth generation of Islamic scholars in the family. His father, Mohammed Siraj ud-din, grandfather and great-grandfather had all been maulvis (Muslim doctors of law or imams). The Lahiz family hailed from Panipat, a town situated in the modern day Haryana state of India. The Muslims of Panipat had a reputation for being zealous in the faith of Islam and were well-versed in Islamic jurisprudence.

Imad ud-Din Lahiz was a prolific writer. He translated the Quran into Urdu and also composed several Bible commentaries. In addition to Lahiz’s writings about Islam, its history, faith and practices, his translation of the Quran into Urdu and his many Bible commentaries, he wrote many rebuttals to the works of Sir Syed Ahmad Khan and Mirza Ghulam Ahmad, the founder of the Ahmadiyyah movement in Islam.

He assisted Rahmatullah Kairanawi alongside Muhammad Wazîr Khân to represent the Muslim side in a widely publicised Muslim-Christian debate featuring German Christian Karl Gottlieb Pfander in Agra, 1854. The interest of the debate aroused, led a number of Muslims to read Pfander's literature and consider the questions that had been discussed. Some, such as Imad ud-Din Lahiz himself and Sufi Maulvi Safdar Ali who was also in attendance and a close friend, subsequently converted to Christianity. Imad ud-din Lahiz was so impressed with Pfander's arguments in his work Mizan Al Haqq (The Balance of Truth) that he noted upon his conversion to Christianity:

"We can now, I think, say that the controversy has virtually been complete ... [that] the Christians have obtained a complete victory, while our opponents have been signally defeated."

== Conversion ==
Lahiz converted to Christianity at Amritsar on 29 April 1866, together with his aged father and brother. The primary cause behind his conversion was to ensure his attainment of salvation. His conversion was followed by that of his wife, five sons and four daughters.

This is his own account from the document referred to:

"The writer became a Christian on April 29, 1866, simply for the sake of attaining salvation. But many people, among them my elders, friends, acquaintances and others, have expressed various ideas of their own about me. There are those who say that Imad ud-Din is merely a fictitious person, a doubt shared by some persons in Peshawar. Others say, that I became a Christian for worldly gain. Some orthodox Muslims cannot believe that I have really become a Christian, an opinion expressed by people in Qaroli and elsewhere. Thus, I have deemed it necessary to relate my full story in such a way that all who know me may know that the subject of this account is truly I."

== Works ==
Imad-ud Din Lahiz wrote his autobiography in 1866. After becoming a Christian, Lahiz wrote a book entitled Tahqiq ul-Iman, criticizing those Maulvis who he felt were unnecessarily putting faith in Islam.

== See also ==
- Christianity in India
- List of former Muslims
- List of converts to Christianity
- Pfander Vs Rahmatullah debate
- Noor-ul-Haq, book written by Mirza Ghulam Ahmad in response to Imad-ud-Din's Tawzinul-Aqwal

== Bibliography ==
- Tahqiq ul-lman,
- Tauzin ul-Aqwal
- Hidayat ul-Muslimin,
- Haqiqi Irfan,
- Naghma-i Tamburi,
- Talim-i Muhammadi,
- Tarikh-i Muhammadi,
- Ittifaqi Mubahatha,
- Athar-i Qiyamat,
- Tafsir-i Mukashafa,
- Waqiat-i Imadiyya

== Sources ==
- History of the Church Missionary Society Vol.11, pp. 561–572.
- Heirs of the Prophets: An account of the clergy and Priests of Islam, Samuel Marinus Zwemer, Moody press, 1946, p. 127
