= A'la-Hazrat (disambiguation) =

A'la-Hazrat is a Persian form of address.

A'la-Hazrat may also refer to:

- Shah Abdul Wahhab (born 1831)
- Ahmed Raza Khan Barelvi (1856–1921)
- Ala Hazrat Express (via Bhildi), a train
- Ala Hazrat Express (via Mahesana), a train
- Ala Hazrat, magazine of the Barelvi movement
