= Shah Abdul Wahhab =

Shah Abdul Wahhab may refer to:

- Shah Abdul Wahhab (born 1831), Sunni scholar from South India
- Shah Abdul Wahhab (born 1894), Sunni scholar from southeastern Bangladesh
