= Ibrahim Ali Khan =

- Nawab, Sir, GCSI GCIE
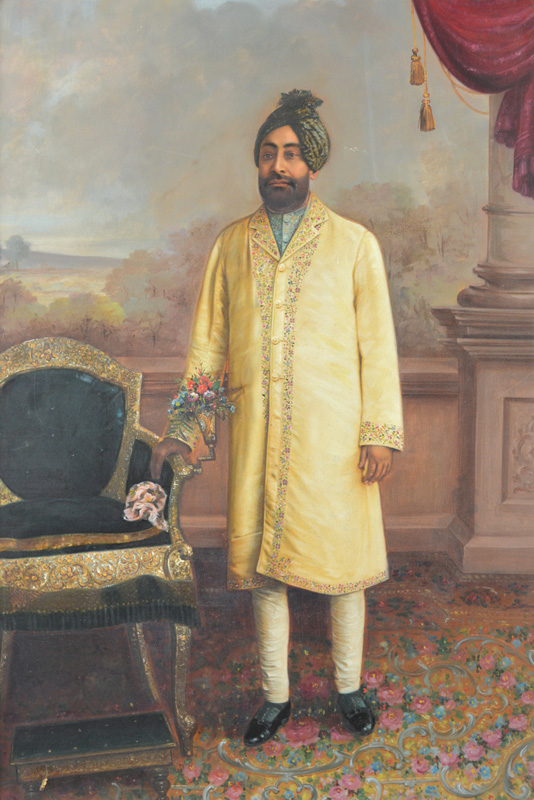
- Ibrahim Ali Khan in 1910

Nawab of Tonk
- Reign: 20 December 1867 – 23 June 1930
- Predecessor: Muhammad Ali Khan
- Successor: Saadat Ali Khan
- Born: Muhammad Ibrahim Ali Khan; 8 November 1849; Tonk State, Rajputana Agency, British India (present-day Rajasthan, India)
- Died: 23 June 1930 (aged 80); Tonk State, Rajputana Agency, British India (present-day Rajasthan, India)
- Begum: Ladli Begum & 5 more
- Issue: 36
- House: Salarzai
- Father: Muhammad Ali Khan
- Religion: Islam

Muhammad Ibrahim Ali Khan GCSI GCIE (8 November 1849 – 23 June 1930) was the Nawab of Tonk from 1867 until his death in 1930.

He ascended the throne of Tonk following the deposition of his father by the British, who was charged guilty of mass murder. He attended all three Delhi Durbars. In 1901, he passed a law for the conservation of wildlife and the environment in his state. This was also the first law enacted in present day Rajasthan for such a purpose.

== Early life ==
Ibrahim Ali Khan was born on 8 November 1849 at Tonk State, British India. His father Muhammad Ali Khan was the third Nawab of Tonk. His mother was a daughter of Ahmad Ali Khan.

In 1864, Ibrahim Ali Khan started a practise of sacrificing camels on Eid al-Adha. The family discontinued the practise in 2014, after Rajasthan declared the camel as a state animal.

== Reign ==
Ibrahim Ali Khan's father Muhammad Ali Khan was found guilty in the mass-killings of the Thakur of Lawa state and his relatives. As a result, he was deposed by the British and exiled to Varanasi with a yearly pension of ₹60,000 (equivalent to ₹26 million or US$280,000 in 2023). Subsequently, Ibrahim Ali Khan ascended the throne of Tonk on 20 December 1867 at the age of 20. As a punishment, his gun salute was reduced to 17 from 21.

As the Tonk State was in debts to the British at the time of Ibrahim Ali Khan's coronation, a regency council under the leadership of his grand-uncle Ubaidullah Khan was appointed. The council was removed in 1870 and Ibrahim Ali Khan was invested to rule the state. At the 1877 Delhi Durbar, he was given a salute of 17 guns in the presence of Edward VII, the Prince of Wales. He also attended the other two Delhi Durbars held in 1903 and 1911. He was appointed a Knight Grand Commander of the Order of the Star of India in the 1913 New Year Honours.

In 1901, Ibrahim Ali Khan passed the Shikar Act of 1901. This was the first law enacted in present day Rajasthan for the conservation of natural resources, wildlife and the environment.

Ibrahim Ali Khan died on 23 June 1930 at Tonk. He was succeeded by Saadat Ali Khan, a son of Ladli Begum.

== Personal life ==
Ibrahim Ali Khan married six times. While four of his wives were from the royal family, one wife was from the royal family of Rampur State. His wives are - Nawab Ladli Begum, Nawab Hajira Begum, Nawab Maimuna Begum, Nawab Mulka Jamil-uz-Zamani Begum, Amir-uz-Zamani Begum and Mubarak-uz-Zamani Begum. He fathered twenty-one sons and fifteen daughters.

Ibrahim Ali Khan's full name with titles is "His Highness, Wazir-ul-Mulk, Nawab Hafiz Sir Muhammad Ibrahim Ali Khan Sahib Bahadur, Saulat Jung, Nawab of Tonk".
