= Shah Abdul Wahhab (born 1831) =

Islamic scholar and reformer (1831-1921)

Shah Abdul Wahhab Sahib
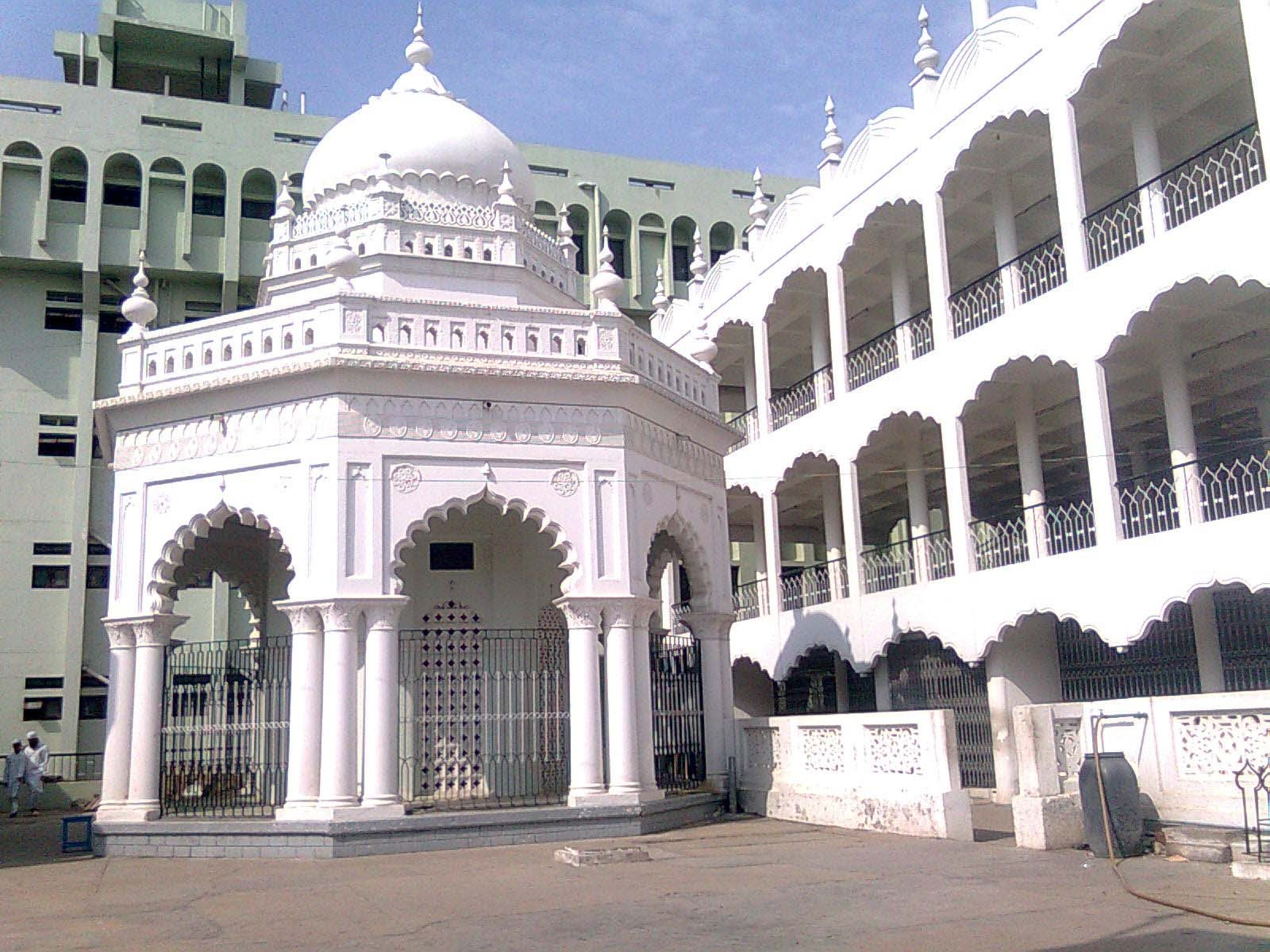
- Maqbara of Shah Abdul Wahhab
- Title: A'la Hadrat

Personal life
- Born: Abdul Wahhab; 1 Jumādā al-Ūlā 1247 Hijri (19 October 1831) Vellore, Tamil Nadu, India
- Died: 22 Rabi al- Aakhir 1337 Hijri (25 January 1919 (aged 87)) Vellore, Tamil Nadu, India
- Resting place: Waranda of Masjid Al-Baqiyat As-Salihat 12.919711°N 79.135758°E
- Region: Tamil Nadu, India
- Notable work(s): Islamic Social Reform during the later part of the 19th century, Fight against Bid'ah or Unislamic Innovations in Islam, Founder of Madrasa Al-Baqiyat As-Salihat,
- Occupation: Muhaddtih, Faqeeh, Historiographer

Religious life
- Religion: Islam
- Denomination: Sunni
- Tariqa: Qadiriyya, Chishtiya

Shah Abdul Wahhab (Note: Tamil: அஃலா ஹள்ரத் மவ்லானா ஷாஹ் அப்துல் வஹ்ஹாப், Arabic: اعلى حضرت مولانا شاه عبد الوهّاب) (9 October 1831 – 1921), also known as A'la Hadrat, (Note: Also transliterated A'la Hazrat, Ala Hadrat, Ala Hazrat; Tamil: அஃலா ஹள்ரத்,அஃலா ஹஜ்ரத்) was a Sunni Islamic scholar and reformer. He was active in the late 19th and early 20th centuries. He was from the southern part of India. Like Shah Waliullah Muhaddith Dehlvi, he was worried about the state of the South Indian Muslims, especially those of Nagore and its nearby regions. In 1857, he founded the Madrasa Al-Baqiyat As-Salihat in Vellore.

== Early life ==
Shah Abdul Wahhab was born on 1 Jumādā al-Ūlā of Hijri 1247 (19 October 1831) in Vellore. His father, Abdul Qadir Sahib, died when he was 4 years old in Madurai, India. He moved into his mother's household in Vellore and gained early education there.

== Early education ==
In Vellore, after having finished his pre-school education with his mother and uncle, Shah Abdul Wahhab did his primary schooling with Hakeem Jainul Abideen, a teacher and medical practitioner, who lived in the same street. He completed his primary education in Arabic and Persian languages with him.

To complete the necessary education of the time, Shah Abdul Wahhab left for Madurai. There he stayed together with Abdus Salaam Ibrahim, along with whom he learnt from Bahrul uloom Saahibul Karaamaat Ash Sheikh Meer Amjad Ibrahim Chinna Hazrat the second of Madurai Maqbara hazrats in Madurai for seven years.

Having finished his schooling, Shah Abdul Wahhab returned to Vellore. He married and started his family life. On 15 Sha'ban 1284 AH, he left for Hijaz, Arabia, while his three-year-old son and family stayed in India.

== Higher education ==
In Mecca, he learned from Rahmatullah Kairanawi, Imdadullah Muhajir Makki and Muhammad Hussein Peshawari.

Shah Abdul Wahhab learned some Islamic books and Munazara from Rahmatullah Kairanawi. He completed his higher studies in the principles of Hadith from Syed Muhammad Hussein Peshawari. He pledged allegiance to his teacher Imdadullah Muhajir Makki and started his spiritual journey. He found yet another teacher in Abdul Latheef back home in Vellore.

== Strange coincidence ==
Muhammad Qasim Nanotvi, the founder of the Madrasa Darul Uloom Deoband in North India and A'la Hadrat, the founder of the Madrasa Al-Baqiyat As-Salihat in South India shared a common lineage in their Islamic Studies.

Shah Abdul Wahhab's teachers were Rahmatullah Kairanawi, Muhammad Hussein Peshawari and Abdul Latheef. And the scholar who taught these three was Maulana Shah Muhammad Is-haaq.

The teacher of Muhammad Qasim Nanautavi in his higher studies was Shah Abdul Ghani and his teacher was Shah Muhammad Is-haaq.

Shah Muhammad Is-haaq's teacher was Shah Abdul Aziz whose teacher was none other than Shah Waliullah Muhaddith Dehlvi. And thus this common lineage of Wahhab and Muhammad Qasim Nanotvi in Islamic Higher Studies goes as far as Shah Waliullah Muhaddith Dehlvi.

Further, in their spiritual studies and journey, Shah Abdul Wahhab and Muhammad Qasim Nanotvi are even more closely related. Both their spiritual teacher was none other than Haji Imdadullah Muhaajir Makki.

Though these two scholars, Shah Abdul Wahhab and Muhammad Qasim Nanotvi, shared a common lineage in the Islamic Studies and Spiritual path, there is no definite proof that these two Islamic Reformers of the Indian Sub-Continent ever met.

== Islamic services ==
After completing his studies,Shah Abdul Wahhab was offered the post of Deputy Collector when he was visiting Hyderabad. But he turned down the offer. Returning from Hyderabad, the first thing he did was to make himself financially stable. He sold off his ancestral land in Zameen Attur and bought land in Vellore. This provided him with an income. After he attended to his personal financial statement, he commenced his Islamic Social Services. He visited villages and towns and called Muslims to live their lives according to Shariah and stressed the need for it. When it came to Bid'ah, he vehemently opposed it and voiced against it publicly. In this course, he stayed in Thittachery for a long period and educated the Muslims about Islam and Bid'ah that had crept into their beliefs again and again. Though the people of Thittachery vowed to stay away from Bid'ahs and Shirk, they did it only for a short period.

At this juncture, Mohamed Ghouse advised him to start a Madrasa so that graduates could aid him in his Islamic social reforms. So he founded the Islamic Madrasa Al-Baqiyat As-Salihat in 1884. He also started the Khanqahey Baqiyat in Vaniambadi, which served as a centre for the Qadiriyya and Chishtiya orders.

== Madrasa Al-Baqiyat As-Salihat ==
On the lines of his teacher Rahmatullah Kairanawi, Shah Abdul Wahhab started a madrasa in his house without many resources. Rahmatullah Kairanawi was founding the Madrasa Sawlatiyya in Mecca around that time. There is no reference to the name of this small Madrasa.

This madrasa founded in a small house grew into the Madrasa Al-Baqiyat As-Salihat with a new Syllabus at its present location in 1884 (Hijri 1301).

The nadrasa had three objectives. The first was Islamic education, the second was emphasise and call Muslims towards the Sunnah and the third was to create service minded Islamic scholars who would be steadfast in their fight against Bid'ah or un-Islamic innovations in Islam.

Following the footsteps of his teacher Rahmatullah Kairanawi, who wrote authored the famous Islamic works, Izhar ul-Haqq, Izalathush Shukook, Izalathul Awham, A'la Hadrat spearheaded the Islamic Da'wah and answering Christians in South India. It is astonishing to find that there was no other Islamic scholar of his calibre when it came to Islamic social reform during the later part of the 19th century or the earlier part of the 20th century in Tamil Nadu.
