= Muhammad Ali Khan (Tonk State) =

Ruler of the princely state of Tonk from 1864 - 1895

- Nawab of Tonk

Nawab of Tonk
- Reign: 1864–1867
- Predecessor: Muhammad Wazir Khan
- Successor: Ibrahim Ali Khan
- Died: 1895; British Raj, Varanasi, modern day Uttar Pradesh
- Issue: Ibrahim Ali Khan
- Father: Muhammad Wazir Khan
- Religion: Islam

Muhammad Ali Khan (reigned 1864–1895) was the third Salarzai Pashtun ruler of Tonk, a princely state in Rajasthan. He succeeded his father Nawab Wazir Khan.

Muhammad Ali struggled with the Thakurs of Lawa state of Rajasthan. This driven to an arrangement of equipped clashes, coming full circle in the Khan's choice to resolve the matter by allocating with his equal and a many of his cousins. An examination by the Indian British Government in 1867 set up Muhammad Ali blameworthy, coming about in his statement and banish from Tonk State beneath the Viceroy's orders. He was transferred to spend the leftover portion of his life in Benares, Uttar Pradesh, where he died in 1895.

Preceded by Wazir Khan	Nawab of Tonk; 1864-1895	Succeeded by Ibrahim Ali Khan
