= Chitu Khan =

Pindari Jat chief and general

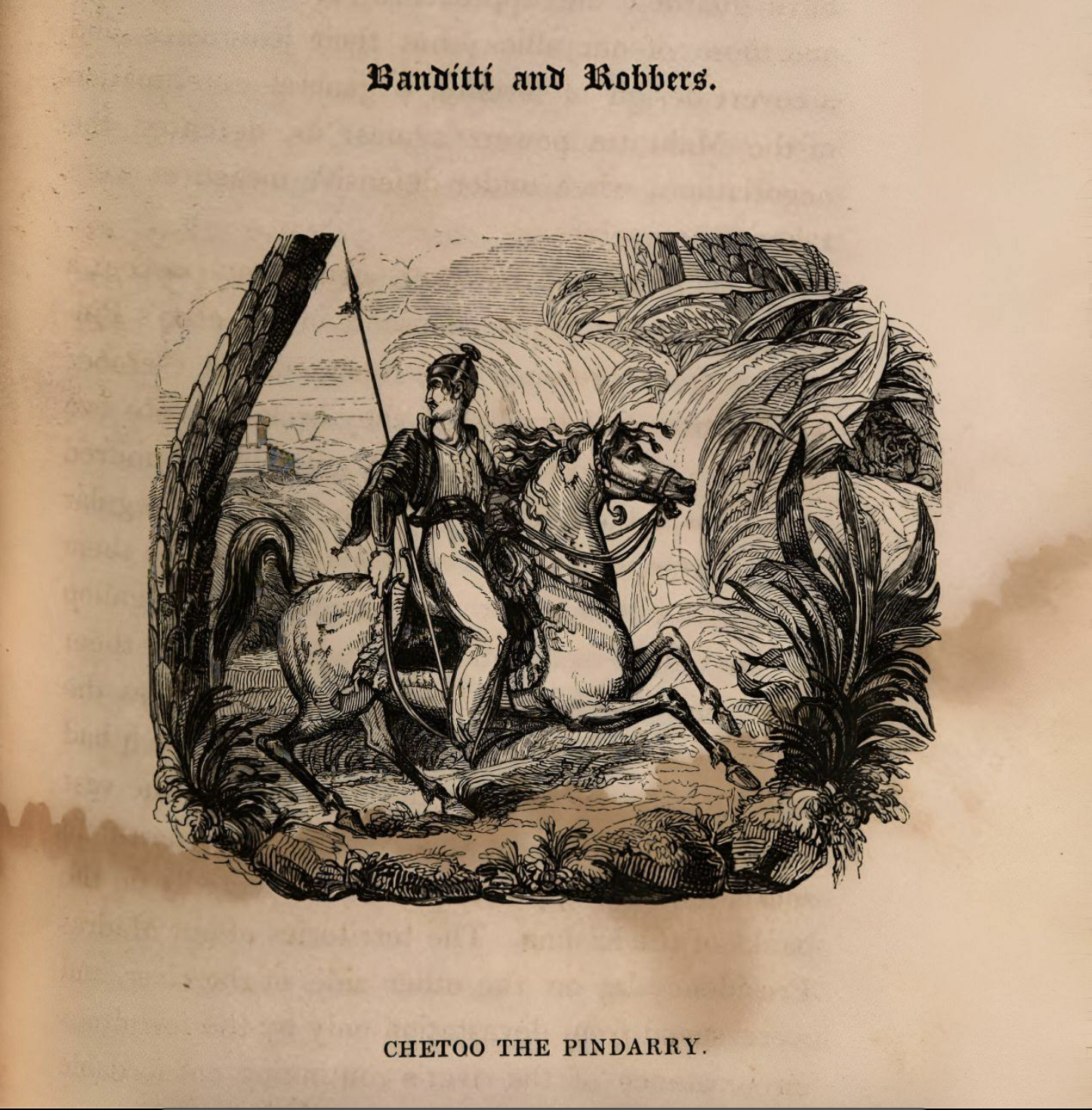
- Chitu Khan the Pindari Chief

Pindari Chief and General
- Preceded by: Doubla Khan

Personal details
- Born: near Delhi (present-day India)

Military service
- Branch/service: Pindaris
- Battles/wars: Third Anglo-Maratha War

Chitu Khan was a Pindari Muslim Jat chief and general, officially in the service of the House of Scindia. He was an able chief, and led in several campaigns to plunder Hyderabadi, Rajput, Maratha, and British domains. In 1805, Chitu was granted the title of Nawab by Scindia. He would assume the name of Nawab Muhammad Kamal Khan Mustakeen Jung Bahadur.

== Early life ==
Chitu Khan was born into a Jat family.

In his childhood, he was enslaved and later bought by Doubla Mehar (or Doobla Khan), a Pindari chief out on an expedition with Mahadji Scindia. Doabla would raise him as a son. Chitu would grow to become the de-facto leader of his own durrah (faction).

== Career ==
Chitu's durrah maintained a force of 25,000 troops. In addition, he had 2,000 infantry to garrison forts, 6 elephants, 2 palkees, a naubat, 2 grand bazars, 2 flags, and 100 hircarras (scouts). His banner was of bhugwa (saffron) color, with a white snake in the center. The first banner was presented to him by the Bhonsla Raja of Nagpur.

Chitu was granted the 'Panj Mahals' of Nimar, Rajgarh, Talien, Satwas, and Kilichpur from Scindia. Upon being recognized as an official chief, he was also granted Singpur Bari and Chipaner from Bhonsla, and Leileepur from Vazier Muhammad Khan. The jagir of Chitu (and Rajun) had an estimated worth of 5,87,000 rupees.

He was a competent and respected administrator, arguably the most powerful of his class. Sir John Malcolm, who would later take possession of his lands, was impressed by his previous governance. He was a liberal by nature, distributing land among his followers so they could maintain themselves without plunder. His word was honored among the Pindaris, while those of other chiefs could be disobeyed.

=== Relations with the Marathas ===
The Pindaris were officially in the service of the Maratha Confederacy. However, despite this arrangement, they would often take any opportunity to plunder their Maratha patrons. In Chitu's case, despite his allegiance to Scindia, he had made himself virtually independent of him, and often ravaged his territories. In 1813, Chitu laid waste to the territories south of Narbada. Scindia was forced to send expeditions against him, but they ultimately failed to stop his predations.

The Peshwa was not safe from the Pindaris either. After having plundered Burhanpur, Adilabad, and Ajanta regions, Chitu and Karim led a party of 5,000 into the Peshwa's territory, crossing into the Western Ghats to sack and loot the region, reaching as far as Sanganer.

=== Invasions of Rajputana, Gujarat and the Western Ghats ===
In 1808-9, Chitu would lead a party of four to five thousand to plunder Surat, entering Gujarat from Mewar and spreading out across the region. In 1812, the Pindaris returned to raid Surat again. Chitu would also lead a party of 14,000 into the Western Ghats, where he plundered several towns; Moha, Soopa, Kalayanwari, Navsari, and Attavesy suffered immensely.

In 1815, Chitu followed other Pindari chiefs into Rajputana. He would gather a party of 9,000 and encamp near Neemuch, from where he would begin his predations, marching towards Chitor and plundering villages along the way. He would remain at Chitor for a time, laying waste to the surrounding environs, before returning to his domain with the captured booty.

=== Invasions of the Hyderabad State ===
In 1815, the Pindaris looked to the wealthy Hyderabad State for a source of plunder. A party of 8,000 ventured south. They split into two parties to cover more ground. The raid was a monumental success, and the booty collected by them was greater than any previous expedition. Chitu's share alone had to be brought back on 4 elephants.

=== Invasions of British domains ===
Emboldened by the fabulous success of the previous year, the Pindaris organized another campaign into the Deccan, this time targeting British domains too. In 1816, Chitu led a party with the intention of attacking Madras, but, due to the unexpected overflow of the Krishna River, had to retreat. Later that year, another party from Chitu's durrah attempted to plunder the region, but suffered heavy losses from British forces; the Pindaris were only able to kill Captain Drake in retaliation.

In 1817, the Pindaris would take revenge of the previously failed invasions. They horribly ravaged British territories.

=== Pindari War (Third Anglo-Maratha War) ===
At last, the British resolved to end the Pindari threat. They assembled the largest military force in India thus far, and launched a campaign which would come to be known as the Pindari War, an extension of the larger Third Anglo-Maratha War.

Chitu sided with Scindia during the war. He was stationed with other Pindari chiefs north of the Narmada valley. He led 10,000 horsemen, most of which were only armed with spears. However, before the war properly began, the massive British force would induce Shinde into accepting a treaty, in which he would cede all his territories and forts.

== Death ==
Despite Shinde's surrender, Chitu would continue his resistance against the British until the very end. He was known for his fiercely anti-British sentiments, promising to "ravage and destroy the country of the English". He was determined to continue the fight, even as fellow chiefs, such as Amir Khan, accepted more favorable offers from the British.

Mahendra Roy wrote:

"It was [Chitu] who exhorted the Pindaris to carry on the struggle, when all of them wanted to give up... this may be animal courage, yet courage he had, courage to fight the mighty British... He was a man of extraordinary doggedness and tenacity. Once he had taken a decision, he would not flinch from it, whatever the obstacles. Having entered the fray with the English, he carried on the struggle single-handed, till the last moment."

Chitu was given no clemency. He was continuously tracked by British authorities, until he fell prey to a tiger.

== See also ==
- Jat Muslim
- Pindari
- Amir Khan (Tonk State)
- Maratha Empire
- British Empire

== Bibliography ==
- Roy, Mahendra Prakesh (1973). Origin, Growth, and Suppression of the Pindaris. Sterling Publishers.
- McEldowney, Philip (1966). Pindari Society and the Establishment of British Paramountcy in India. University of Wisconsin.
- Naravane, M. S. (2006). Battles of the Honourable East India Company: Making of the Raj. APH Publishing. ISBN 978-81-313-0034-3.
- Burton, R.G. (1910). The Mahratta And Pindari War. Simla: Government Press.
- Gott, Richard (2011). Britain's Empire: Resistance, Repression and Revolt. Verso Books. ISBN 9781844677382.
- Sinclair, David (1884), History of India, Madras: Christian Knowledge Society's Press.
- Martine van Woerkens (2002). The Strangled Traveler. University of Chicago Press. ISBN 9780226850856.
- Kothiyal, Tanuja (2016). Nomadic Narratives: A History of Mobility and Identity in the Great Indian Desert. Cambridge University Press. p. 112. ISBN 978-1107080317.
