= Tonk State =

Princely State of India

Coordinates: 26.17°N 75.78°E

- State Within the Maratha Confederacy (1806 - 1818); Princely State of British India
- 1806–1949
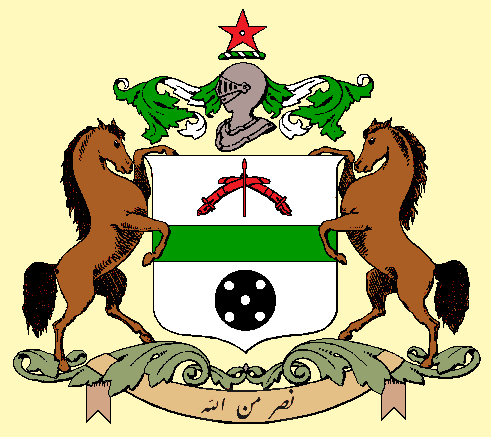
- Flag Coat of arms

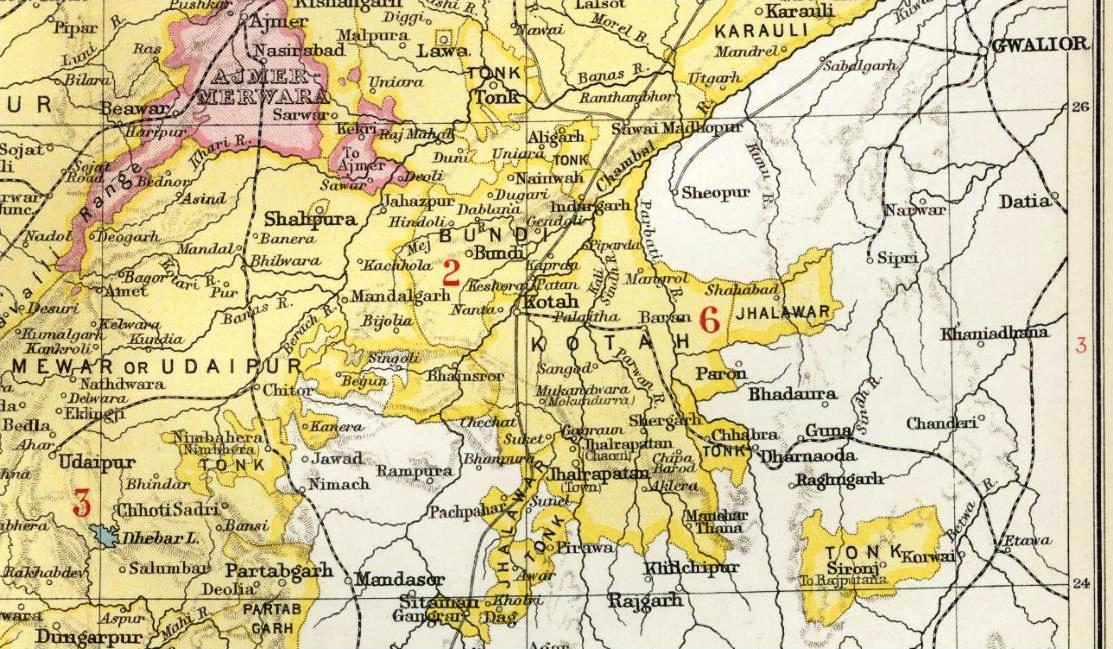
- Tonk State in the Imperial Gazetteer of India
- Capital: Tonk
- Area
  - 1931: 6,512 km^{2} (2,514 sq mi)
- Population
  - 1931: 317,360
- Government
  - Motto: "Nasr min Allah" (Victory from God)
- History
  - Established: 1806
  - Independence of India: 1949
Succeeded by
Dominion of India
- Today part of: Rajasthan (India)

Tonk was a princely state in India under the supervision of the Rajputana Agency of the British Raj. It was located primarily in the present-day Indian state of Rajasthan with small portions in Madhya Pradesh. The town of Tonk, which was the capital of the state, had a population of 273,201 in 1901. As a salute state, its ruler, styled the Nawab of Tonk, was granted a 17-gun salute. The state came to an end after the partition of India when the Nawab of Tonk acceded to India. At that time, it was the only princely state of Rajputana with a Muslim ruling dynasty.

Its first ruler, Muhammad Amir Khan was originally granted the state by the Holkar dynasty in 1806. Tonk and the surrounding regions were captured from Jaipur State and rewarded to Amir Khan for his services. In 1817, after the Third Anglo-Maratha War, Amir Khan submitted to the British East India Company; the British acknowledged Amir Khan as the hereditary ruler of Tonk on the condition that he disbanded his army, which consisted of 52 battalions of infantry, 15,000 Pashtun cavalry and 150 artillery. He surrendered on the condition that the British enlist his men and buy his artillery. Rampura and Aligarh were presented as gift by the British to Amir Khan for his co-operation.

== Geography ==
The state was formed of several enclaves located in an area covered by the alluvium of the Bands, and from this, a few rocky hills composed of schists of the Aravalli Range protrude, together with scattered outliers of the Alwar quartzites. Nimbahera is for the most part covered by shales, limestone and sandstone belonging to the Lower Vindhyan group, while the Central India districts lie in the Deccan trap area, and present all the features common to that formation.

Besides the usual small game, antelope or ravine deer, and nilgai (Boselaphus tragocamelus) used to be common in the plains, and leopards, sambar deer (Cervus unicolor) and wild hog were found in many of the hills. Formerly, an occasional tiger was met in the south-east of Aligarh, the north-east of Nimbahera and parts of Pirawa and Sironj.

The total area of the princely state was 2,553 square miles (6,610 km^{2}) with a population in 1901 of 273,201.

By treaty Tonk became a British protectorate in 1817. Following the Independence of India, Tonk acceded to the newly independent dominion of India on 7 April 1949. It was located in the region bordering present-day Rajasthan and Madhya Pradesh states that are now the Tonk district.

== History ==
The founder of the state was Nawab Muhammad Amir Khan (1769–1834), an adventurer and military leader of Pashtun descent from Salarzai Sub-Clan of Yusufzai Tribe of District Buner. He rose to be a military commander in the service of Yashwantrao Holkar of the Maratha Empire in 1798. In 1806, Khan received the state of Tonk from Yashwantrao Holkar. In 1817, after the Third Anglo-Maratha War, Amir Khan submitted to the British British East India Company. As a result, he kept his territory of Tonk and received the title of Nawab. While retaining internal autonomy and remaining outside British India, the state came under the supervision of the Rajputana Agency and consisted of six isolated districts. Three of these were under the Rajputana Agency, namely, Tonk, Aligarh (formerly Rampura) and Nimbahera. The other three, Chhabra, Pirawa and Sironj, were in the Central India Agency. The Haraoti-Tonk Agency, with headquarters at Deoli, dealt with the states of Tonk and Bundi, as well as with the state of Shahpura.

A former minister of Tonk state, Sahibzada Obeidullah Khan, was deputed on political duty to Peshawar during the Tirah campaign of 1897.

In 1899–1900, the state suffered much distress due to drought. The princely state enjoyed an estimated revenue of £128,546 in 1883–84; but no tribute was payable to the government of British India. Grain, cotton, opium and hides were the chief products and exports of the state. Two of the outlying tracts of the state were served by two different railways.

Nawab Sir Muhammad Ibrahim Ali Khan GCIE (ruled 1867–1930) was one of few chiefs to attend both Lord Lytton's Durbar in 1877 and the Delhi Durbar of 1903 as ruler.

In 1947, on the Partition of India whereby India and Pakistan gained independence, the Nawab of Tonk decided to join India. Subsequently, most of the area of the state of Tonk was integrated into Rajasthan state, while some of its eastern enclaves became part of Madhya Pradesh.

The foundation of the principality of Tonk led to the creation of a large Rajasthani Pathan community.

== Rulers ==
The rulers of the state were Salarzai subtribe of Yusufzai Pashtuns of Buner. They were entitled to a 17-gun salute by the British authorities. The last ruler before Indian independence, Nawab Muhammad Ismail Ali Khan, had no issue.

=== Nawabs ===
- Muhammad Amir Khan (1806–1834)
- Muhammad Wazir Khan (1834–1864)
- Nawab Muhammad Ali Khan (1864–1867)
- Ibrahim Ali Khan (1867 – 23 June 1930)
- Nawab Muhammad Saadat Ali Khan (23 June 1930 – 31 May 1947)
- Nawab Muhammad Faruq Ali Khan (1947–1948)
- Nawab Muhammad Ismail Ali Khan (1948-1974)
- Nawab Masoom Ali Khan (1974–1993)
- Nawab Aftab Ali Khan (1993–present)

== See also ==
- Lawa Thikana
- List of Pashtun empires and dynasties
- Political integration of India
- List of Sunni Muslim dynasties
