= A'la-Hazrat =

A'la-Hazrat (Classical Persian: اعلیٰ‌حضرت Aʿlā-Ḥażrat) (Note: Iranian Persian transliteration: Aʿlâ-Ḥażrat; Tajik: Аълоҳазрат.) for a man, or 'Ulya-Hazrat (Classical Persian: علیاحضرت ʿUlyā-Ḥażrat) (Note: Iranian Persian transliteration: ʿOlyâ-Ḥażrat; Tajik: Улёҳазрат.) for a woman, is a form of address used in the Persian language as well as in languages of the Persianate world including Turkic languages (Note: Azerbaijani: Əlahəzrət/Ülyahəzrət; Turkish: Alahazret/Ulyahazret; Uzbek: Aʼlohazrat/Ulyohazrat.) and Urdu. (Note: Urdu: اعلیٰ حضرت Aʿlā Ḥażrat / علیا حضرت ʿUlyā Ḥażrat.) It is a compound of the words اعلیٰ aʿlā, from Arabic أعلى ʾaʿlā (feminine: عليا ʿulyā), and Persian حضرت ḥażrat, from Arabic حضرة ḥaḍra. Its literal meaning is 'the presence of the most high', and it is equivalent to Majesty in English.

The form of address has also been used in reference to some Islamic scholars such as Imdadullah Muhajir Makki (1817–1899), Shah Abdul Wahhab (1831–1921) and Ahmed Raza Khan Barelvi (1856–1921).
