= Safdar Ali =

Christian writer (1830–1899)

Safdar Ali (Urdu: صفدر علی; 1830–1899) was a convert from Islam to Christianity. He was born in the native state of Dholpur, and was the son of an orthodox Syed gentleman. Ali's father personally saw to his education which was deeply rooted in the religion of Islam but he also received instruction from other Islamic and philosophical scholars from around their city of residence. While Ali was still young, his father, who held the position of Qazi in Dholpur, was dismissed from this role and he chose to move their family to Agra. From here Ali continued his studies which led to his philosophical and theological questioning of his childhood religion of Islam. Ali's questioning led to what he called a three-year struggle through the Christian and Mohammedan scriptures as well as other works of controversy pertaining to either faith. At the end of his three-year journey, Ali finally attained what he called his full assurance of salvation. He was finally baptized on Christmas Day in 1864.

== Early life and education ==
Since an early age, Ali showed great interest in topics of metaphysical sciences, philosophy, polemical debates, and various topics in Muslim theology. When he was young, Ali's father began to teach and guide him in his study of the religion of Islam. Ali recounted in one of his letters to the Church Missionary Society, the extent to which his father went to ensure that his son received the best education possible. Giving up much of his free time away from work, his father was the largest influence in his training to become a Muslim scholar. Ali states again in the same letter that even after his father had been removed from his position in Dholpur and they had settled in Agra, despite the luxuries that they could no longer afford, his father remained steadfast and encouraged Ali daily which as he states, "produced the deepest longings in my mind". In addition to his father's teaching, he also received instruction from other Islamic scholars in Agra. Ali dedicated much of his time into studying other religions and philosophies as well. Religious Hindu books, ancient Greek philosophical texts (in their Arab translations), as well as works by atheists, sophists and deists, were all in addition to his regular study of orthodox Islam. However, despite his studying of other religious texts, the Christian Scriptures did not come across his study until later in his life when he was appointed Deputy Inspector of Schools in Rawul Pindee. After his homeschooling, Safdar Ali then went on to receive an education from the British Governmental College in Agra which focused on physical sciences, mathematics, and introductions to English literature.

== Career ==
After graduating from the college in Agra, Ali was granted the distinction of being a maulvi. He was in attendance during the great debate in 1854 where public controversy broke out between Pfander and the leading maulvis of that time in reaction against his writings, particularly that of Mizan-Ul-Haqq. In his evidence given before the 1882 Education Commission presided over by W. W. Hunter, Safdar Ali gave an overview of his career in the Educational Department of the British Raj from 1854 to 1872. From 1854 to 1856 he was Persian teacher and Assistant Professor of Natural Philosophy in the Agra Government College. For the next four years he was Deputy Inspector of Schools in the Punjab including Rawalpindi. From 1860 to 1872, he held a similar position in Jubbulpore. During this time he also officiated as Inspector of Schools and was on tour in the Districts of Narsinghpur and Narmadapuram. After he left the Education Department in 1872, he continued his service as Extra Assistant Commissioner in Jabalpur in the Central Province's, where he was serving at the time of the Education Commission and at Union Eternal.

== Journey to conversion ==
In his years of scholarship, both in the governmental school and his religious studies, Ali came to find that Islam's sources of theology (the Koran and the Hadith) appeared to be in contradiction to what his studies in physical science had proven to be true. Yet in spite of this, he fortified himself in his faith by making the assertion (similar to that of Tertullian centuries prior), “What has reason to do with revelation?” However, as he continued his scholarly pursuits, his findings remained true.

While being Deputy Inspector of Schools, Ali came across a group of Sufi philosophers and fakirs whose practices of austerity and self-mortification enticed him greatly, and, in an attempt to fill his feelings of spiritual emptiness, he took up their disciplinary practices. These practices had the intended purpose of creating inner life, purity, and holiness of heart. However, as time went on they had the reverse effect on Ali than what he had hoped. His spiritual longings became greater, and the outward disciplines of which the Sufi's had taught him became the means through which his spiritual pangs grew. In his relationship with this group of mystics he became aware of what they described as a "spiritual guide" which was necessary in order to pursue this inward purity. With this knowledge Ali went about searching in an attempt to find a guide that would give him direction toward spiritual fulfillment but none were found. With regard to his search for a spiritual guide, Ali later wrote a letter to the Church Missionary Society in which he stated:

In my search after a guide, I waited upon a great number of Sheikhs and Fakeers, but many of them turned out to be nothing better than worldlings and hypocrites. Some, indeed, had the true Sufi temper, and were devout persons, loving God, and worshipping Him according to the instructions and directions of their spiritual guides, and employing themselves day and night in religious exercises and prayers. However, I was seeking for an infallible guide and unfailing director--for one who could discern and particularize my spiritual disease, and indicate its cause, and work a complete cure, and bring me full assurance--one who was not a quack-one who was not himself diseased.

In the midst of his endless search Ali was transferred to a new region called Jabalpur. It was here that his spiritual mourning deepened, and with advice from friends, and perhaps a last attempt to find spiritual fulfillment, he planned a pilgrimage to Arabia. However, financial obligations connected to his property forced him to postpone his pilgrimage to Arabia to a later date. It was at this time while going through his books that he stumbled upon Mizan-ul-Haqq by Rev. C. G. Pfander (with whom he had prior contact), as well as some Christian scriptures, both of which enticed him to study the controversy between Islam and Christianity thoroughly. It was then between the years of November 1861 and December 1864 that Ali suffered through his inquiries, spending as much time that he could afford, both day and night, in pursuit of the truth about the two religions.

In the first year of his intense struggle, Ali had discerned what he believed to be the truth: that Muhammad was not the prophet of God, and that the Koran, and the Hadith were not divinely inspired pieces of literature. He still held his previous disciplinary practices in high regard however, but only in so far as how he perceived that they revealed to a person their spiritual state of depravity. Additionally, he found that the Christian scriptures held a diagnosis and cure for what he felt was his 'spiritual disease' and that the scriptures themselves gave such purposeful care in their presentation of this process, that he believed that he had found within them divine and infallible character.

In the second year of Ali's struggle he became convinced of not only what he called the "triumph of Christianity" but also of what he found to be the falsehood of all other religions and religious philosophies. Even the disciplinary practices of other religions that he had once held in such high esteem became pointless as far as he was concerned as, comparably, he thought that these practices only produced a false sense of piety to those that participated in them. Ali also found it important to note, that during this second year he was filled with great anguish over his predicament as to being "without creed or faith, and still unpossessed of eternal salvation," and in addition to this he was also afflicted with a strong bodily illness which left him in desolate condition.

By the time the third year of his struggle came around Ali was so deeply entrenched in his study and his ailment had gotten so severe that many of his close friends came to him and pleaded with him to reconsider his study. They pleaded that no religion was without small discrepancies and that his study was not worth the effect it was having on his health. Despite the constant warnings, rebukes, and pleas, Ali's resolve remained the same as he was convinced that God's revelation had indeed been made clear and he was determined to discover the full extent of what that was. Finally, at the end of his spiritual struggle, Ali found what he called his 'full assurance of salvation' and he was baptized Christmas Day of 1864. In addition, Ali's two close companions, who had also endured similar hardships and struggles, were baptized. Kasim Khan was baptized on the same day as Ali, and, Karim Bakhsh who was baptized shortly thereafter.

After his baptism and conversion, Ali received persecution from some of his friends and family, to the point of which his wife, child, and father-in-law all left him and returned to Agra. Other people ceased communication with Ali entirely, and others still, intrigued by his findings were spurred to begin some questioning of their own.

== Influence and writings ==
Being a public figure in his occupation, as well as a learned and reputable man within the Muslim religious community, Safdar Ali had a substantial amount of influence, and after his conversion he was active in Christian missionary efforts to the Muslim communities around him. He also wrote a few works about the conclusions of his study between Islam and Christianity. Much of his works have not been translated into English.

Some of his more influential and popular works are: Ghizai Ruh, which consists of hymns and sacred songs; Khallat Nama, which was a treatise regarding the issues of religious toleration; and Niaz Namah (currently only available in Urdu, the language in which it was originally written), which is a volume consisting of his letters that he wrote to his family shortly after his conversion explaining the reasons why he decided to abandon Islam as well as some refutations of popular arguments held against Christianity by Islamic theologians.

Ali also worked much with the Church Missionary Society after his conversion and he submitted several letters, papers, and treaties to help the missionary efforts in the regions that he was involved in. Some of these correspondences can be found in a journal entitled Church Missionary Intelligencer.
