= Ahmed Deedat =

South African–Indian Islamic orator and author (1918–2005)

Shaykh Ahmed Deedat

Personal life
- Born: Ahmed Husein Deedat; 1 July 1918 Tadkeshwar, Bombay Presidency, British India
- Died: 8 August 2005 (aged 87) Verulam, KwaZulu-Natal, South Africa
- Resting place: Verulam cemetery
- Spouse: Hawa Deedat (m. 1937)
- Children: Yusuf Deedat
- Parents: Hussien Kazem Deedat (father); Fatma Deedat (mother)
- Website: Ahmed-Deedat.net

Religious life
- Religion: Islam
- Denomination: Sunni
- Jurisprudence: Hanafi
- Profession: Missionary; Orator; Writer

Muslim leader
- Influenced by: Rahmatullah Kairanawi
- Influenced: Zakir Naik
- Awards: King Faisal International Prize (1986)
- Years active: 1942–1996
- Known for: Comparative religion

Ahmed Husein Deedat (Note: Gujarati: અહમદ હુસેન દીદત; Urdu: احمد حسین دیدات; Arabic: أحمد حسين ديدات) (1 July 1918 – 8 August 2005) was an Indian-South African Islamic author, intellectual, and orator on comparative religion. He was best known as a Muslim missionary, who held numerous inter-religious public debates with evangelical Christians, as well as video lectures on Islam, Christianity, and the Bible.

Deedat established the IPCI, an international Islamic missionary organisation, and wrote several widely distributed booklets on Islam and Christianity. He was awarded the King Faisal International Prize in 1986 for his fifty years of missionary work. He wrote and lectured in English.

== Early years (1918–1942) ==
Deedat was born to Gujarati Muslim parents in the town of Tadkeshwar, British India in 1918. His father had emigrated to South Africa shortly after his birth. At the age of 9, Deedat left India to join his father in what is now known as Kwazulu-Natal. His mother died only a few months after his departure. Arriving in South Africa, Deedat applied himself with diligence to his studies, overcoming the language barrier and excelling in school, even getting promoted until he completed standard 6. However, due to financial circumstances, he had to quit school and start working by the time he was at the age of 16.

In 1936, while working as a furniture salesman, he met a group of missionaries at a Christian seminary on the Natal South Coast who, during their efforts to convert people of Muslim faith, often accused the Islamic prophet Muhammad of having "used the sword" to bring people to Islam. Such accusations offended Deedat and created his interest in comparative religion.

Deedat took a more active interest in religious debate after he came across the book Izhar ul-Haqq (Truth Revealed), written by Rahmatullah Kairanawi, while he was rummaging for reading material in his employer's basement. This book chronicled the efforts of Christian missionaries in India a century earlier. The book had a profound effect on Deedat, who bought a Bible and held debates and discussions with trainee missionaries, whose questions he had previously been unable to answer.

He started attending Islamic study classes held by a local Muslim convert named Mr. Fairfax. Seeing the popularity of the classes, Mr. Fairfax offered to teach an extra session on the Bible and how to preach to Christians about Islam. Shortly thereafter, Fairfax had to pull out and Deedat, by this point quite knowledgeable about the Bible, took over teaching the class, which he did for three years. Deedat never formally trained as a Muslim scholar.

== Early missionary work (1942–1956) ==
Deedat's first lecture, entitled "Muhammad: Messenger of Peace", was delivered in 1942 to an audience of fifteen people at a Durban cinema named Avalon Cinema.

A major vehicle of Deedat's early missionary activity was the 'Guided Tours' of the Jumma Mosque in Durban. The vast ornamental Jumma Mosque was a landmark site in the tourist-friendly city of Durban. A program of luncheons, speeches and free hand-outs was created to give an increasingly large number of international tourists what was often their first look at Islam. Deedat himself was one of the guides, hosting tourists and giving introductions to Islam and its relationship with Christianity.

In 1949, Deedat moved to Pakistan with his family and lived in Karachi for three years near Pakistan Chowk during which he became a Pakistani citizen under the Pakistan Citizenship Act, 1951. According to an interview on Pakistan Television, he had been a strong proponent of the idea of an Islamic state.

== IPCI and as-Salaam (1956–1986) ==
Among Deedat's close friends were Gulam Husein Vanker and Tahir Rasul, whom many refer to as 'the unsung heroes of Deedat's career'.

In 1957, these three men founded the Islamic Propagation Centre International (IPCI) with the aim of printing a variety of books on Islam and offering classes to new Muslims converts. The next year Deedat established an Islamic seminary called As-Salaam Educational Institute on a donated 75-acre (30 ha) piece of land located in Braemar in the south of Natal province. The experiment was not a success, however, because of the IPC's lack of manpower and paucity of funds, and was taken over by the Muslim Youth Movement of South Africa in 1973. Deedat then returned to Durban and expanded the IPC's activities.

== International efforts (1985–1995) ==
By the early 1980s Ahmed Deedat's work was beginning to be known outside his native South Africa. His international profile grew in 1986, when he received the King Faisal Award for his services to Islam in the field of Dawah (Islamic missionary activity). As a result, aged 66, Deedat began a decade of international speaking tours around the world. His tours included:

- Saudi Arabia and Egypt (on several occasions)
- United Kingdom (on several occasions between 1985 and 1988, as well as Switzerland in 1987)
- Pakistan, where Deedat met Zia al-Haq
- UAE and Maldives Islands (Nov–Dec 1987), where Deedat was honoured by President Maumoon Abdul Gayoom
- The US (late 1986 featuring debates with Swaggart, Robert Douglas and several lectures including two in Arizona)
- Sweden and Denmark (late 1991, featuring three debates)
- US and Canada (1994, tour featuring debates in Canada and lectures in Chicago)
- Australia (his last tour in early 1996, just before his stroke)

On the other hand, Deedat received heavy criticism from liberal Muslim groups in South Africa which felt he inaccurately represented Islam and was intolerant of people of other religions, including Christians, Hindus, Jews and Jains. Several monthly editions of the Muslim Digest of South Africa (July, August, September, October) in 1986 were almost entirely devoted to criticising Deedat's stance and "his various dangerous activities".

Problems arose after the publication of From Hinduism to Islam (1987), a critique of Hindu beliefs and practices. Among others, Deedat criticised South African Hindus for praying to their various deities and being easily moved to convert to Christianity. Hindus and Christians had respected his oratory skills and arguments until then. But now, they rejected Deedat and united with other South African Muslim organisations in denouncing his attacks on other religions. Two years later, Jews joined the criticism after Deedat published Arab and Israel – Conflict or Conciliation?

In 1988, following the publication of Salman Rushdie’s fictional work The Satanic Verses, Deedat supported the fatwā of the Ayatollah Ruhollah Khomeini calling for Rushdie's death. He said that Rushdie "is a hypocrite and has blasphemed holy personalities. He should not be pardoned."

In his last tour to Australia, the publicity resulting from the presence of Deedat caused Franca Arena, member of the Legislative Council of the government of New South Wales to comment in her speech concerning racism:

Of course, other victims of racism are often Australians who are visibly different, especially women who wear Muslim attire. While I condemn such attacks, I also condemn attacks against Christians by Muslims who come to Australia to sow the seed of religious hatred. In this regard I refer to Islamic evangelist Sheik Ahmed Deedat, a South African who, on Good Friday, spoke about Easter, indulged in bible-bashing and incited racial hatred. I am all for freedom of speech, but our leaders should show some understanding and, above all, respect for the views and beliefs of others. Australia can do without people like Sheik Deedat. I do not know why he came to Australia or why he adopted such a confrontationist approach on Good Friday at a big public meeting at Sydney Town Hall when he disparaged the Christian faith. I certainly do not support such an approach.

== Illness and death (1996–2005) ==
Ahmed Deedat suffered a stroke which left him paralyzed from the neck down because of a cerebral vascular accident affecting the brain stem (on 3 May 1996), leaving him unable to speak or swallow. He was flown to King Faisal Specialist Hospital in Riyadh, where he was reported to be fully alert. He learned to communicate through a series of eye-movements via a chart whereby he would form words and sentences by acknowledging letters read to him.

He spent the last nine years of his life in a bed in his home in South Africa, looked after by his wife, Hawa Deedat, encouraging people to engage in Da'wah (proselytizing Islam). He received hundreds of letters of support from around the world, and local and international visitors continued to visit him and thank him for his work.

On 8 August 2005, Ahmed Deedat died at his home on Trevennen Road in Verulam in the province of KwaZulu-Natal. He is buried at the Verulam cemetery. Hawa Deedat died on Monday 28 August 2006 at the age of 85 at their home. His funeral prayer was led by Ismail ibn Musa Menk.

== Writings and speeches ==
Cover of Ahmed Deedat's book The Choice

With funding from the Gulf states, Deedat published and mass-produced over one dozen palm-sized booklets focusing on the following major themes. Most of Deedat's numerous lectures, as well as most of his debates in fact, focus on and around these same themes. Often the same theme has several video lectures to its credit, having been delivered at different times and different places.

- Is the Bible God's Word?
- What The Bible Says About Muhammad.
- Combat Kit Against Bible Thumpers.
- Crucifixion or Cruci-Fiction
- Muhammad: The Natural Successor to Christ.
- Christ in Islam
- Muhammad The Greatest.
- Al-Qur'an the Miracle of Miracles

His famous quote is :

Islam will win with or without you. But without Islam, you will get lost and you will lose.

Capitalizing on his popularity in the Middle East following his receipt of the King Faisal Award, Deedat secured a grant to print a collated volume of four of his popular booklets. 10,000 copies of this book titled The Choice: Islam and Christianity were initially printed in April 1993; this book was very popular in the 1990s, available for free at many missionary outlets across North America. Subsequently, several printing houses offered to print more, and within two years another 250,000 copies had been printed in several print runs across the Middle East.

Later, a second paperback volume entitled The Choice: Volume Two containing six more of Deedat's booklets was published. Deedat also widely promoted a South African printing of The Holy Qur'an Translation by Abdullah Yusuf Ali with commentary and a detailed index. This was widely sold at subsidised cost to the general public, and is often mentioned in Deedat's speeches.

Deedat also produced a booklet entitled "Al-Qur'an: the Ultimate Miracle" featuring the theory of 'the Number 19' that was popularised by Arizona-based Egyptian computer analyst Dr. Rashad Khalifa. However, this booklet was withdrawn after Dr. Khalifa disclosed some controversial beliefs, including his rejection of the entire Hadith literature of Islam.

== Style ==
According to one scholar, Brian Larkin, "Deedat's da’wa is of a particular kind. He has little to say about the errancy of Sufism or Shi’ism, for instance, and makes no particular demand for establishing an Islamic state (though he was supportive of these efforts in Nigeria). Rather his entire effort is directed at undermining and refuting Christian evangelism and arming Muslims against Christian attacks. His fame is thus based not on the mastery of Islamic sciences but on his thoroughgoing knowledge of the Bible. As one Nigerian characterized him, Deedat opened the eyes of millions of Muslims in the fine art of inter-religious dialogue." His knowledge of English, his skill at debating, and his mastery of other scriptures "endeared him to the millions who have seen his videos or read his tracts, millions of which are sent free of charge all over the world. ... Deedat's source of authority, then, is an unusual one, drawing on the mastery of Christian rather than Muslim texts and his skill at English rather than Arabic."

== Criticism ==
The building housing the IPCI was originally named the Bin Laden Centre, after Sheikh Muhammad bin Laden (patriarch of the Bin Laden family and father of Osama bin Laden) made a substantial donation toward its construction. A family member later told South Africa's Sunday Times that the Bin Ladens had contributed around $5 million to the IPCI over the years. In interviews given after the September 11 attacks, Deedat and his son Yusuf said Deedat had met Osama bin Laden in the 1980s through this family connection, describing him at the time as a "freedom fighter" recently returned from fighting in Afghanistan. Deedat, who consistently argued against the use of force in religious propagation stating "he who takes his sword and tries to propagate with that will do little for himself" restricted his own missionary activity to public debate and written argument.

"Deedat's debates and writings have been labelled as a form of "Apologetics through Polemics" by David Westerlund, an associate professor at the department of comparative religion, Stockholm University and an expert on Islam in Africa."

Muslim scholar Farid Esack has criticised Deedat, comparing him to such fundamentalists as Rabbi Meir Kahane and Jerry Falwell, and writing:

"Deedat's multitude of anti-Christian, anti-Jewish and anti-Hindu videotapes have told us all that there is to be told about the other, and we are comfortable with that. There are times, of course, when questions surface about the importance of correct dogma, about the importance of labels to a God whom we believe sees beyond labels and looks at the hearts of people. Instead of pursuing these questions, we hasten back and seek refuge in "the known." We order another of those Deedat tapes."

The Stephen Roth Institute for the Study of Contemporary Antisemitism and Racism called Deedat "anti-Jewish" without providing any explanation. In France sale and distribution of his books has been forbidden since 1994 as they are said to be violently anti-western, antisemitic and inciting to racial hate.

His supporters, among them his son maintain that he was "a promoter of free speech and dialogue," while Abdulkader Tayob of University of Cape Town comments that he was only responding to Christian proselytization in a manner that was "not good or bad – but worth reflecting on."

== See also ==
- Dawah
- Islamic view of Jesus' death
- Swoon hypothesis
- Zakir Naik
