= Amir Khan (Tonk State) =

Ruler of the Princely State of Tonk in India from 1798 to 1834

Amir Khan Pindari
- Nawab of Tonk
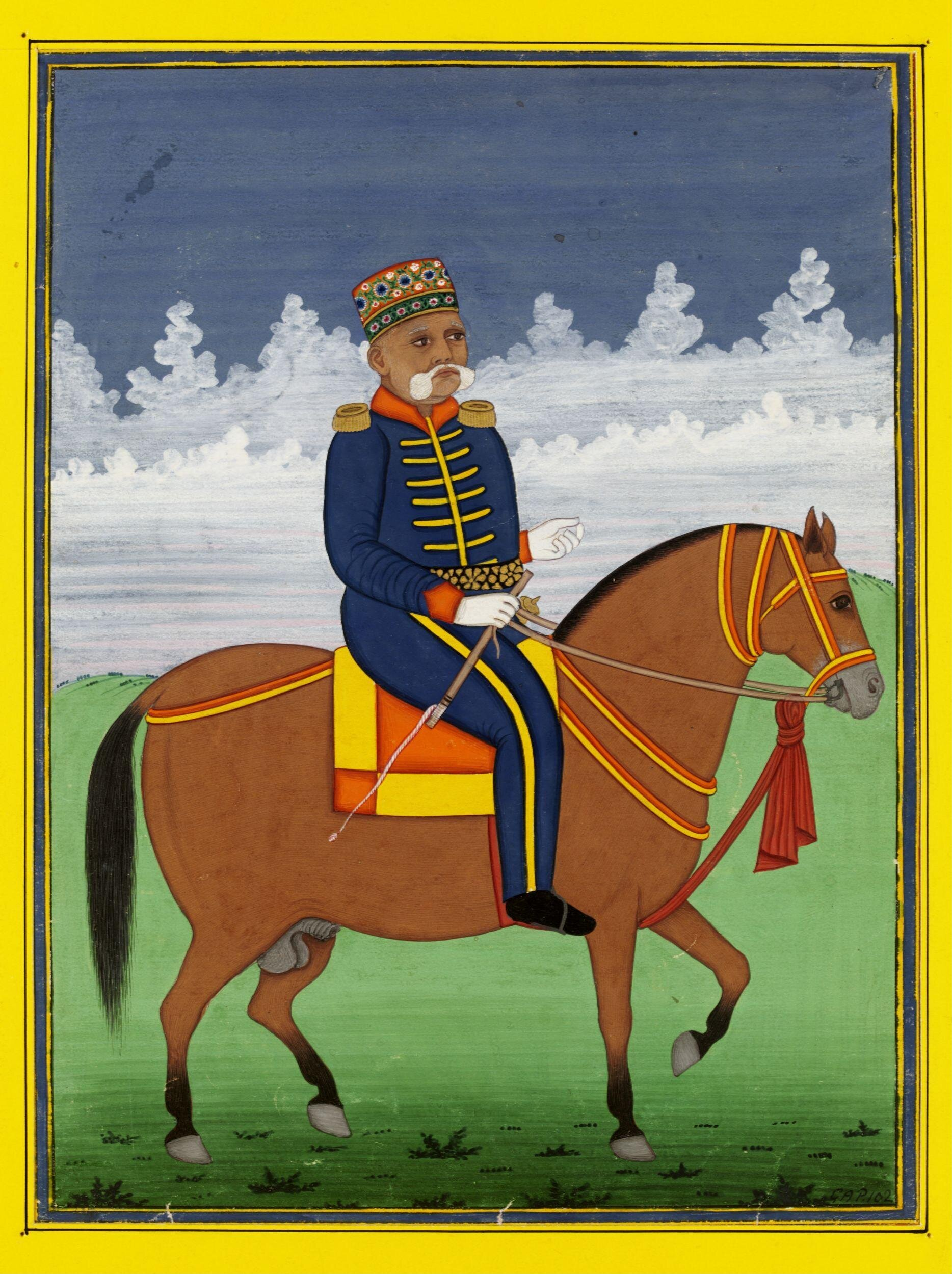
- Amir Khan Pindari (Nawab of Tonk)

Commadar of Pindaris of Maratha Empire
- Reign: 1799–1818
- Predecessor: Position Established
- Successor: Position Deestablished

Nawab of Tonk
- Reign: 1806–1834
- Predecessor: Position Established
- Successor: Muhammad Wazir Khan
- Born: 1769; Maratha Empire, modern day Uttar Pradesh
- Died: 1834 (aged 64–65); Tonk State, British Raj, modern day Rajasthan
- Issue: Muhammad Wazir Khan; 11 other sons
- Father: Hayat Khan
- Religion: Islam
- Occupation: Commander of Marathas

Nawab Amir Khan (1769–1834) was a military general in the service of Yashwantrao Holkar of the Maratha Empire and later became the first ruler of the princely state of Tonk (in present day Rajasthan, India). Amir Khan was a Hindustani Pathan and a North Indian Muslim. Born and bred in Sambhal, Amir Khan was the son of a Zamindar in Uttar Pradesh, Hayat Khan, while his grandfather Taleh Khan was a Pashtun from the Salarzai tribe, sub-tribe of Illyaszai of Musazai Yusufzai Tribe of Village Jowar, District buner in modern-day Pakistan who had migrated to and acquired land in Rohilkhand.

== Life ==
Amir Khan rose to be a military commander in the service of Yashwantrao Holkar of the Maratha Empire in 1798. In 1806, Khan received the state of Tonk from Yashwantrao Holkar of the Maratha Empire. Amir Khan's troops were composed of Hindustani Pathans from Uttar Pradesh, Afridis of Malihabad in Oudh, and south-country Hindus. The Hindustani immigrants also included Indian Muslims from Hindustan such as Mir Zafar Ali, a Barha Sayyid of Fatehpur Haswa in Oudh.

While the Pindaris tended to concentrate on the east and south central India, Amir Khan and his Pathans concentrated on the north and Rajasthan. At the height of his power, he is said to have controlled a personal following of 8,000 cavalry, 10,000 infantry and up to 200 guns. The largest contingent amongst the Maratha chiefs, by far.

After the defeat of the Rohillas in the Rohilla War of 1774–5 against the British, he fought against them. He had acquired the town and pargana of Tonk and the title of Nawab from Yashwantrao Holkar in 1806, and this area together with some other scattered parganas that he held, was combined with the pargana of Rampura (Aligarh) and erected into a new principality. Ultimately he established his rule in Tonk in 1806.

In 1817, after the Third Anglo-Maratha War, Amir Khan submitted to the British British East India Company, the Governor-General and Commander-in-Chief, The Marquess of Hastings, resolved to extinguish the Pindaris whom they deemed a menace. The Treaty of Gwalior severed the link between them and Scindia. Moreover, the treaty required the latter to join forces with the British to eliminate the Pindaris and Pashtuns.

Bowing to the inevitable, Amir Khan assiduously came to terms with the British, agreeing to disband his men in return for a large stipend and recognition as a hereditary ruler. Amir Khan was recognized as hereditary nawab, disbanded his forces and quietly settled down to consolidating his little state. He became a faithful friend to the British, earning praise and consideration from successive pro-consuls.

Amir Khan died in 1834. He was succeeded by the oldest of his twelve sons, Muhammad Wazir Khan (r. 1834–1864).

Preceded by Creation	Nawab of Tonk; 1798–1834	Succeeded by Muhammad Wazir Khan

== See also ==
- Tonk State
- Pindari
