= Pendhā =

Indian intoxicating beverage

Pendhā (or pindia) was an intoxicating beverage, originating from the Indian subcontinent, made by the Pindari community of mercenaries in central India in the 18th and 19th centuries, and possibly the etymological origin or the group's name. The drink was said to have been made by fermenting sorghum (jowār), or possible Indigofera linifolia (pandhi, pandheri pati).
