= Pindari =

Irregular military in India

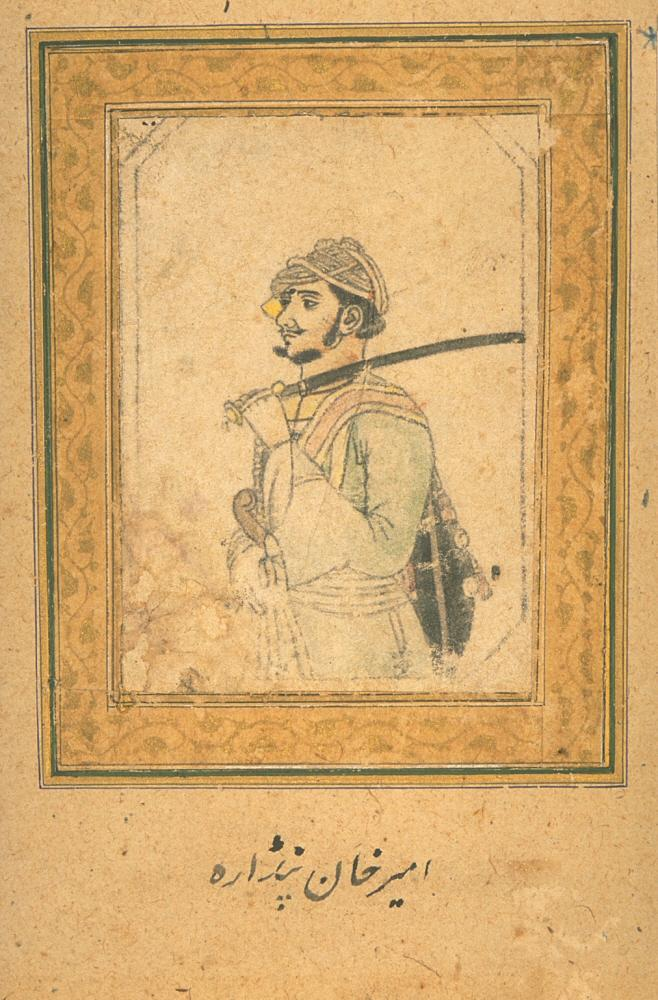
- Disbanded: 1818
- Allegiance: Mughal Empire; Maratha Empire
- Role: Plunderers, foragers, Reconnaissance units
- Size: 20,000 to 30,000 (1800–1818)

Commanders
- Notable commanders: Amir Khan; Chitu Khan; Namdar Khan; Nawab Faqir Muhammad Khan

The Pindaris (Bhalse, Maratha, Rohilla and Pathans) were irregular military plunderers and foragers from 17th- through early 19th-century Indian subcontinent who accompanied initially the Mughal Army, and later the Maratha Army, and finally on their own before being eliminated in the 1817–19 Pindari War. They were unpaid and their compensation was entirely the loot they plundered during wars and raids. They were mostly horsemen armed with spears and swords who would create chaos and deliver intelligence about the enemy positions to benefit the army they accompanied. The majority of their leaders were Muslims, but also had people of all classes and religions.

The earliest mention of them is found in the Mughal period during Aurangzeb's campaign in the Deccan Plateau, but their role expanded with the Maratha Empire armed campaigns against the Mughal Empire. They were highly effective against the enemies given their rapid and chaotic thrust into enemy territories, but also caused serious abuses against allies such as during the Pindari raid on Sringeri Sharada Peetham in 1791. By the early 1800s, armed Pindari militia groups sought wealth for their leaders and themselves. There were an estimated 20,000 to 30,000 Pindari militia during the "Gardi-ka-wakt" ("period of unrest") in north-central India around 1800–1815 CE, who plundered villages, captured people as slaves for sale, and challenged the authority of local Muslim sultanates, Hindu kingdoms, and the British colonies.

Francis Rawdon-Hastings, the Governor-General of British India, led an 120,000 strong force in early 19th-century against the Pindaris during the Third Anglo-Maratha War; the campaign became known as the Pindari War.

== Etymology ==
The term Pindar may derive from pinda, an intoxicating drink. It is a Marathi word that possibly connotes a "bundle of grass" or "who takes". They are also referred to as Bidaris in some historic texts, indicating that they originally came from the Bidar district in central India.

== Appearance and society ==
The Pindaris were horsemen who were mostly armed with a talwar and a large spear. They were organised into groups called durrahs each of which had a leader and were organised into different castes and classes. Allegiances were usually hereditary but membership of each durrah could be interchangeable.

The Pindaris were from a variety of traditional backgrounds, all of which appear to have been accepted within their society. In addition to their individual beliefs, the Pindaris worshipped Ramasah Veer, an ancient Pindari raider, as an icon. Pindari women would place small icons of horses in a shrine dedicated to Veer before the commencement of their raids, and the men would wear tokens stamped with his image. The Pindaris were of all classes but most of their important leaders were Muslims. They converted many of their children and the men whom they took as prisoners. Many Hindus also became converts to obtain honourable association with the fellow Pindaris.

The raids, called luhbur, would be conducted in the dry-season starting from late October. During the rainy season, the Pindari would stay with their families in their native lands around the Narmada River.

== History ==
=== Era of the Deccan Sultanates and the Mughal Empire ===
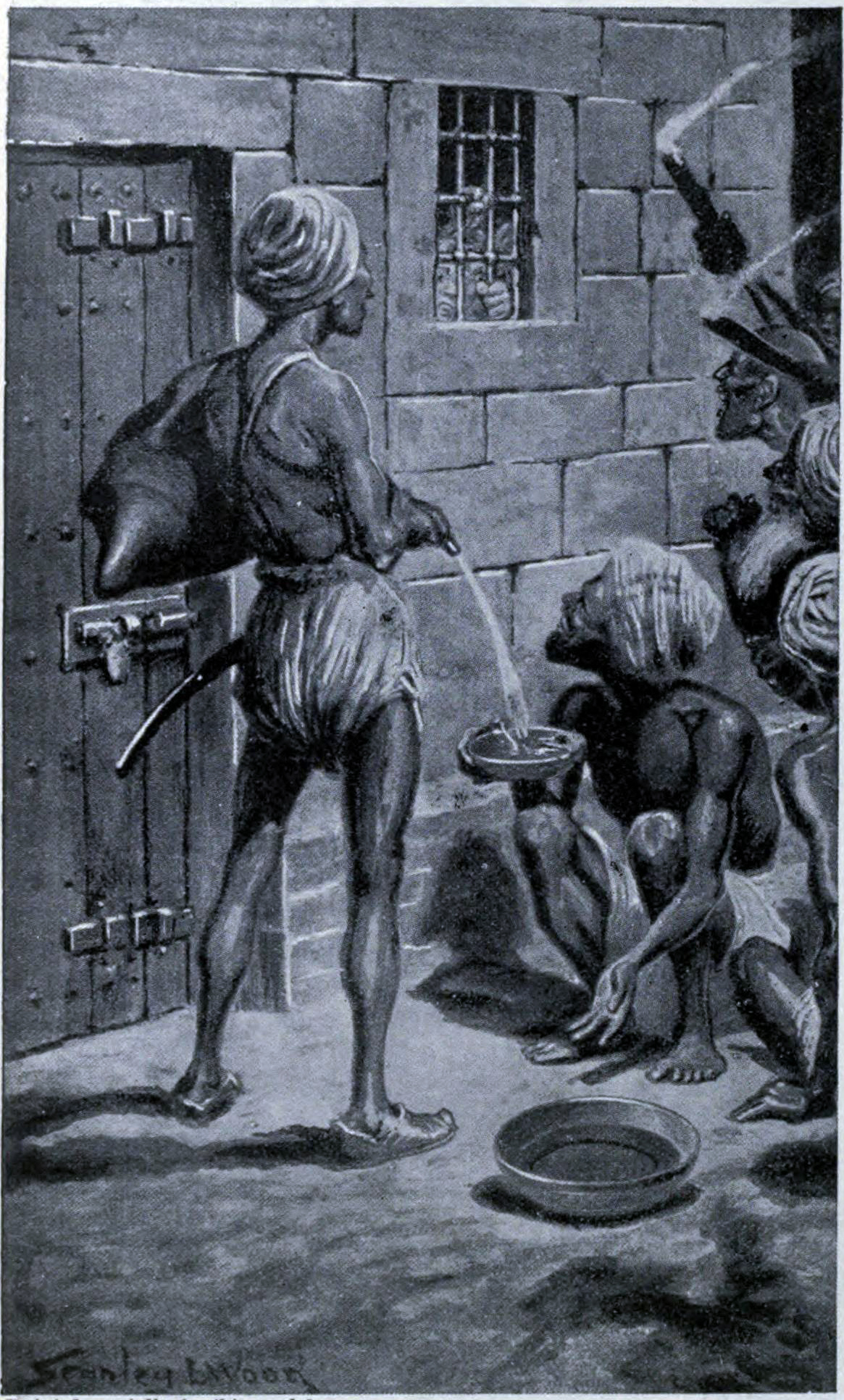
Pindaris loyal to Siraj-ud-Daulah carry out the Black Hole of Calcutta incident, 20 June 1756.

The first clear mention of Pindaris in historical texts occurs in the works of the Persian historian, Firishta, who refers to them marching with the Mughal armies of Aurangzeb during his 1689 campaign in the Deccan Plateau. Around the same time, the Italian traveler Niccolao Manucci, in his memoir about the Mughal Empire, wrote about Bederia (Pidari), stating that "these are the first to invade the enemy's territory, where they plunder everything they find."

According to Tapan Raychaudhuri et al., the Mughal Army "always had in its train the "Bidari" (as pronounced in Persian), the privileged and recognized thieves who first plundered the enemy territory and everything they could find". The Deccan sultanates and Aurangzeb's campaign in central India deployed them against kingdoms such as Golconda, and in Bengal. The unpaid cavalry got compensated for their services by "burning and looting everywhere". The disintegration of the Muslim kingdoms of the Deccan led to the gradual disbandment of the Pindaris. These Muslim Pindaris were at that stage taken in the service of the Marathas. The inclusion of the Pindaris eventually became an indispensable part and parcel of the Maratha Army. As a class of freebooters in Maratha armies they acted as a "sort of roving cavalry...rendering them much the same service as the Cossacks for the armies of Russia." The Pindaris would also later be used by kings such as Tipu Sultan. The Hindu Marathas, in their war against the Mughals, evolved this concept by encouraging the Pindaris not only to plunder the Muslim territories in the north but gather and deliver food to their regular army. The Maratha army never carried provisions, and gathered their resources and provisions from the enemy territory as they invaded and conquered more regions of the collapsing Mughal state. According to the historian Richard Eaton, plunder of frontier regions was a part of the strategy that contributed wealth and propelled the Sultanate systems in the Indian subcontinent. Plunder, along with taxes and tribute payments contributed to growing imperial revenues for the Mughal rulers.

The Bidaris of the Aurangzeb's army and the Pindaris of the Maratha army extended this tradition of violence and plunder in their pursuit of the political and ideological wars. Shivaji, and later his successors, included the Pindaris in their war strategy. Deploying the Pindaris, they plundered the Mughal and Sultanate territories surrounding the Maratha Empire and used the plundered wealth to sustain the Maratha Army.

The devastation and disruption by the Pindaris not only strengthened the Marathas, the Pindaris helped weaken and frustrate the Muslim sultans in preserving a stable kingdom they could rule or rely on for revenues. The Maratha strategy also embarrassed Aurangzeb and his court. The same Pindari-assisted strategy help the Marathas block and reverse the Mughal era gains in South India as far as Gingee and Tiruchirappalli.

=== Maratha era ===
Marathas adopted the Bidaris militia of the earlier era. Their Pindaris were not from any particular religion or caste. Most of the Pindari leaders who plundered for the Marathas were Muslims, such as Gardi Khan and Ghats-u-Din who were employed by the Maratha Peshwa Balaji Baji Rao. Other famed Pindari leaders in the historic literature include Namdar Khan, Dost Mohammad, Wasil Mohammad, Chitu Khan, Khajeh Bush, Fazil Khan and Amir Khan. Similarly, Hindu leaders of Pindaris included the Gowaris, Alande, Ghyatalak, Kshirsagar, Ranshing and Thorat. Hindu ascetics and monks were another pool that volunteered as militia to save their temples and villages from the Muslim invaders but also disrupted enemy supply lines and provided reconnaissance to the Marathas.

According to Randolf Cooper, the Pindaris who served the Marathas were a volunteer militia that included men and their wives, along with enthusiastic followers that sometimes swelled to some 50,000 people at the frontline of a war. They moved swiftly and performed the following duties: destabilize enemy's standing army and state apparatus by creating chaos; isolate enemy armed units by harassing them, provoke and waste enemy resources; break or confuse the logistical and communication lines of the enemy; gather intelligence about the size and armament of the enemy; raid enemy food and fodder to supply resources for the Marathas and deplete the same for the enemy.

The Pindaris of the Marathas did not attack the enemy infantry, rather operated by picketing the civilians, outposts, trade routes and the territorial sidelines. Once the confusion had set in among the enemy ranks, the trained and armed contingents of the Marathas attacked the enemy army. The Marathas, in some cases, collected palpatti – a form of tax – from the hordes of their Pindari plunderers to participate with them during their invasions.

The Pindaris were a major resource for the Marathas, but they also created problems when they raided and plundered the Maratha allies. Shivaji introduced extensive regulations to check and manage the targeted predatory actions of the Pindari.

From 1784, Shinde began recruiting large amounts of Indian Muslim cavalrymen from Mughal, Farrukhabad and Rohilkhand regions. At a time when the Marathas would mobilize 78,000 cavalry, 27,000 were Pindari Muslim cavalry.

=== British Empire era ===
Villagers committing suicide by burning themselves during a Pindari raid

Most of the Pindaris in this time were from Uttar Pradesh and northern parts of Malwa. The decline of Muslim rule in northern India, for the Indian Muslim elite, meant the destruction of a way of life more than a destruction of livelihood. The East India Company's disciplined armies based on the well-drilled musketeer provided little employment and had little use for irregular cavalry. Many of these Indian Muslim cavalrymen, seeking employment, would join the Pindaris. These unemployed Muslim soldiers from the land of Awadh and Rohilkhand in Uttar Pradesh began ravaging and desolating central India, armed with twelve-foot long spears.

With the decline of the prestige of Maratha power in India, the Pindaris almost became supreme. After the arrival of the British East India Company among the chaos of a collapsed Mughal Confederacy and the weakening of the Maratha leadership, the Pindaris became a semi-independent power centred in the area just north of the Narmada River. By late 18th-century, the Maratha Confederacy had fragmented, the British colonial era had arrived and the Pindaris had transformed from being involved in regional wars to looting for the sake of their own and their leaders' wealth. They conducted raids for plunder to enrich themselves, or to whichever state was willing to hire them. Sometimes they worked for both sides in a conflict, causing heavy damages to the civilian populations of both sides. They advanced through central India, Gujarat and Malwa, with protection from rulers from Gwalior and Indore. With the plundered wealth, they had also acquired cannons and more deadly military equipment to challenge local troops and law enforcement personnel. The Amir Khan-linked Pindaris, for example, brought 200 canons to seize and plunder Jaipur. According to Edward Thompson, the Pindaris led by Amir Khan and those led by Muhammad Khan had become nearly independent mobile satellite confederacy that launched annual loot and plunder campaigns, after the monsoon harvest season, on rural and urban settlements. Along with cash, produce and family wealth, these Pindari leaders took people as slaves for sale. They attacked regions under British control, the Hindu rajas, and the Muslim nawabs.

In 1812 and 1813 the Pindaris conducted successful plundering raids on Mirzapur and Surat which were located in areas controlled by the British. In 1816, they undertook an extensive expedition into the East India Company territories around the Guntur district, raiding 339 villages and taking an estimated £100,000 worth of loot. Some of the inhabitants of village Ainavolu committed suicide by throwing themselves into the flames of their burning houses. The British reacted, not only to the financial cost of these raids, but also to the loss of trust the inhabitants had in them as a protective power. They established military outposts south of the Narmada River which contained the Pindaris and prevented any further raids.

=== Pindari War (1817-19) ===
Ultimately, the British East India Company under the governorship of Lord Hastings became so frustrated with Pindari raids that they formed the largest military force they had ever assembled in India to launch a campaign against the Pindaris known as the Pindari War. Rawdon-Hastings, with the approval of the Court of Directors of the East India Company, also utilized this 120,000 strong force to fight against the remaining Maratha forces and annex their remaining territories in what became known as the Third Anglo-Maratha War. From November 1817 until 1819, the British military force entered the Malwa and Maratha regions which were traditional Pindari strongholds; according to the Encyclopædia Britannica, the "Pindaris themselves offered little resistance; most of the leaders surrendered, and their followers dispersed".

In addition to the military action, the British East India Company also offered regular employment to some of the Pindari militia by converting them into a separate contingent of its own forces. A minority were given jobs as police and offered pensions or nawab positions along with land to their leaders such as Namdar Khan and Amir Khan. Chitu Khan, who was a Muslim of Jat origin born near Delhi, harbored violent anti-British feelings, saying he would "ravage and destroy the country of the English". Not given any clemency, he hid in a jungle where he was continuously tracked by authorities and eventually was killed by a tiger.

== In popular culture ==
- Veer, a 2010 film directed by Anil Sharma and starring Salman Khan, depicts the story of a Pindari warrior named Veer Pratap Singh who fought against British colonial rule in Rajasthan.
- In the film Baahubali 2: The Conclusion, when Amarendra Bahubali visit Kuntala Kingdom he successfully nullifies the attack of Pindari and save the state.
- A tribe of Pindaris terrorize British Indian villages in Devil: The British Secret Agent, they're hired by Kenneth Bracken to violate and kill Azad Hind Fauj resistance member Nyshadha until Devil saves her.

== See also ==
- Thuggee
- Bargi
