= Rahmatullah Kairanawi =

Indian Muslim scholar (1818–1891)

- رحمت اللہ کیرانوی

Personal life
- Born: Rahmatullah; 1818 Kairana, British India
- Died: May 1, 1891 (aged 72–73) Makkah, Hejaz Vilayet, Ottoman Empire
- Resting place: Jannat al-Mu'alla
- Era: 19th century
- Region: North India
- Main interest: Countering Christian missionary efforts
- Notable work: Izhar ul-Haqq
- Occupation: Muhaddith, Faqeeh, Historiographer

Religious life
- Religion: Islam
- Denomination: Sunni
- Jurisprudence: Hanafi
- Creed: Maturidi

Muslim leader
- Students: Abdul Awwal Jaunpuri
- Influenced by: Shah Wali Ullah, Shah Abdul Aziz, Shah Ishaq Dehlavi, Haji Imdadullah Muhajir Makki
- Influenced: Ahmed Deedat, Taqi Usmani, Zakir Naik

Rahmatullah Kairanawi al-Hindi (Urdu: رحمت اللہ کیرانوی ہندی; 1818–1891) was a Sunni Muslim scholar and author who is best known for his work, Izhar ul-Haqq.

== Early life and education ==
Kairanawi was born in Kairana, in Muzaffarnagar, in 1818. He is a descendant of the third Caliph, Uthman ibn Affan. He began receiving traditional Islamic education at the age of 6, memorising the Qur'an at 12. He also learned Arabic and Persian. Later, he moved to Delhi where he studied different disciplines, including mathematics and medicine. He privately studied with scholars like Imam Bakhsh Sahbai in Delhi, and Sadullah in Lucknow.

Working as a Mufti and Sharia teacher, he founded a religious school in Kairana. Part of the family wealth, a large property in Kairana, was granted by Akbar the Great.

== Debate with Pfander ==
In 1837 the Church Mission Society appointed Karl Gottlieb Pfander, described by Eugene Stock as "perhaps the greatest of all missionaries to Mohammedans", to Agra in Northern India, where in 1854 he engaged in a famous public debate with leading Islamic scholars. The main Muslim debater was Kairanawi, being assisted by English-speaking Muhammad Wazîr Khân and influential Islamic writer Imad ud-din Lahiz. Kairanawi used arguments from recent European theologically critical works that Pfander was unfamiliar with, having left Europe before these were published, though his main source of reference was the apocryphal sixteenth-century Gospel of Barnabas, which he held to be authentic.

== Indian Rebellion of 1857 ==
Following armed uprisings against the British in which he personally took part, Kairanawi (his property was confiscated by the Imperial British Raj) had to leave all of his property (auctioned later), and board a ship in Bombay. Arriving at the port of Mokha, Yemen, he walked to Mecca. The journey took two years.

== Author ==
Kairanawi wrote books in Arabic, Persian and Urdu.

=== Izhar ul-Haq (Truth Revealed) ===
Written originally in Arabic, the book Izhar ul-Haqq in six volumes was translated later into Urdu, and from Urdu into a summarized English version published by Ta-Ha. The book aims to respond to Christian criticism of Islam. It is the first Muslim book to use Western scholarly works in order to ascertain the errors and contradictions of the Bible. The doctrine of Trinity is purportedly contested using biblical, Christian and other sources. Christine Schirrmacher, a German scholar of Islamic Studies, states in an article on the Pfander-Kairanawi debate: "The Demonstration of the Truth' (izhâr al-haqq) served as a summary of all possible charges against Christianity and was therefore used after al-Kairânawî's death as a sort of encyclopaedia since al-Kairânawî extended the material of former polemicists like 'Ali Tabarî, Ibn Hazm or Ibn Taymiyya to a great extent."

== The Madrasa Sawlatia ==
While residing in Mecca, Kairanawi founded a religious school there named Madrasah as-Sawlatiyah. Rahmatullah Kairanawi was appointed as a lecturer at the Masjid-e-Haram by the Sheikh-ul-Ulama (The Leading Scholar) Sheikh Ahmad Dahlan As-Shafiee. Kairanawi started teaching and realized that lessons were delivered as sermons, rather than, planned academic lectures. He gathered some of the Indian Muslim immigrants, wealthy benefactors to establish an authentic Islamic Law School to teach the Islamic sciences through a sound curriculum. He established the Madrassah in 1290 hijrah corresponding to 1874 A.D. The major contributor was a lady of Calcutta by the name of Sawlat-un-Nisa, on whose name the Madrassah is named. The Madrassah is still in existence and has well known alumni around the world, Madrasah as-Sawlatiyah.

== Death ==
Kairanwi died in 1891 (22 Ramadan 1308 AH) in Mecca and was buried in Jannat al-Mu'alla.

== See also ==
- Ahmed Deedat

== Bibliography ==
- مولانا رحمت اللہ کیرانوی کی علمی و دینی خدمات کا تحقیقی جائزہ
- Mawlāna Abd al-Rashīd Arshad. "Mujāhid-e-Islām Mawlāna Rahmatullāh Kairānwi". In Deobandi, Nawaz (ed.). Sawaneh Ulama-e-Deoband (in Urdu). Vol. 1 (January 2000 ed.). Deoband: Nawaz Publications. pp. 380–470. "adapted from Imdād Sābri's Āsār-e-Rahmat"
