= Zameen Attur =

Zameen Attur Zamin Attur
- village
- Location in Tamil Nadu, India Zameen Attur (India)
- Coordinates: 10.6890007°N 77.9693806°E
- Country: India
- State: Tamil Nadu
- District: Karur

Languages
  - Official: Tamil
- Time zone: UTC+5:30 (IST)
- PIN: 639203
- Telephone code: 04320
- Vehicle registration: TN 47
- Nearest city: Karur, Dindigul, Tiruchirappalli
- Nearest International Airport: Tiruchirapalli International Airport
- Literacy: 90%
- Lok Sabha constituency: Karur
- Vidhan Sabha constituency: Aravakurichi

Zameen Attur (Tamil: ஜமீன் ஆத்தூர்), also spelled Zamin Attur, Zamin Athur, or Zameen Athur), is a small village in Karur, Tamil Nadu, India near Esanatham. It is part of Karur District and surrounded by villages of Dindigul district. The village produces large quantities of drumstick, much of which is exported. Chettinad Cement Factory can also be found in the village. Agriculture is the most important source of work in the area.

== Schools in Zameen Attur ==
(Panchayath union middle school)

== Nearest towns and cities ==
- Dindigul -47 km
- Karur -36 km
- Trichy -94 km
- Madurai -111 km
- Coimbatore -139 km
