= Karl Gottlieb Pfander =

Lutheran Christian missionary and scholar (1803–1865)

- Born: 3 November 1803; Württemberg
- Died: 1 December 1865 (aged 62); Richmond, London
- Occupations: Priest, missionary, apologist

Ecclesiastical career
- Church: Lutheran Church
- Writings: Mizan al-Haqq (The Balance of Truth) and others

Karl Gottlieb Pfander (1803–1865), spelt also as Carl Gottlieb Pfander or C.G. Pfander, was a Lutheran Christian priest, missionary and apologist; he served as a missionary in Central Asia and Trans-Caucasus under the Basel Mission, and as a polemicist to the North-Western Provinces of India under the Church Missionary Society. He was known for converting Muslims to Christianity.

He authored Mizan al-Haqq (The Balance of Truth), an apologetic, Remarks on the nature of Muhammedanism, and more.

== Biography ==
One of nine children, the son of a village baker was born on 3 November 1803 at Württemberg, Germany—Württemberg, his birthplace was one of the few places notorious for Pietistic form of Evangelism, influenced by Pietistic Lutherans like J.A. Bengel and F.C. Oetinger. Pfander attended a local Latin school, and then grammar school in Stuttgart. At the age of sixteen, he had already decided to become a Protestant Christian missionary; accordingly, he got his missionary training in Germany between 1819 and 1821. In due course, he was accepted for training at the newly established Evangelical Institute at Basel in Switzerland between 1821 and 1825, and became fluent in Persian, Turkish, and Arabic languages. Karl Gottlieb Pfander was ordained as a Lutheran priest, with his holy orders being conferred in the state church. During his first appointment with the Basel Mission (BM) [German: Evangelische Missions Gasellschaft] at Shusha in Karabakh Khanate, Azerbaijan, he quickly learned Armenian and Azerbaijani languages, and fine-tuned his Persian language skills; he served for twelve years at BM society between 1825 and 1837, studying the Arabic language and Quran. He married Sophia Reuss, first wife; a German, in Moscow on 11 July 1834; however, she died in a childbed in Shusha on 12 May 12, 1835. In 1837, he joined the Church Missionary Society (CMS) when BM was closed by Russia in Central Asia; consequently, he was sent to India for sixteen years between 1837 and 1857. He married Emily Swinburne, second wife; an English woman, in Calcutta on 19 January 1841, who bore him three boys and three girls. In 1858, he was sent to Istanbul by CMS following an uprising against the British rule in India. Pfander returned to Britain when CMS activity in the city was suspended as Ottoman opposed his controversialist approach. He died on 1 December 1865 at Richmond, London.

He is buried at St Andrew's Church, Ham Common. His epitaph reads that he was "a leading champion in the great controversy between Christianity and Mahommedanism."

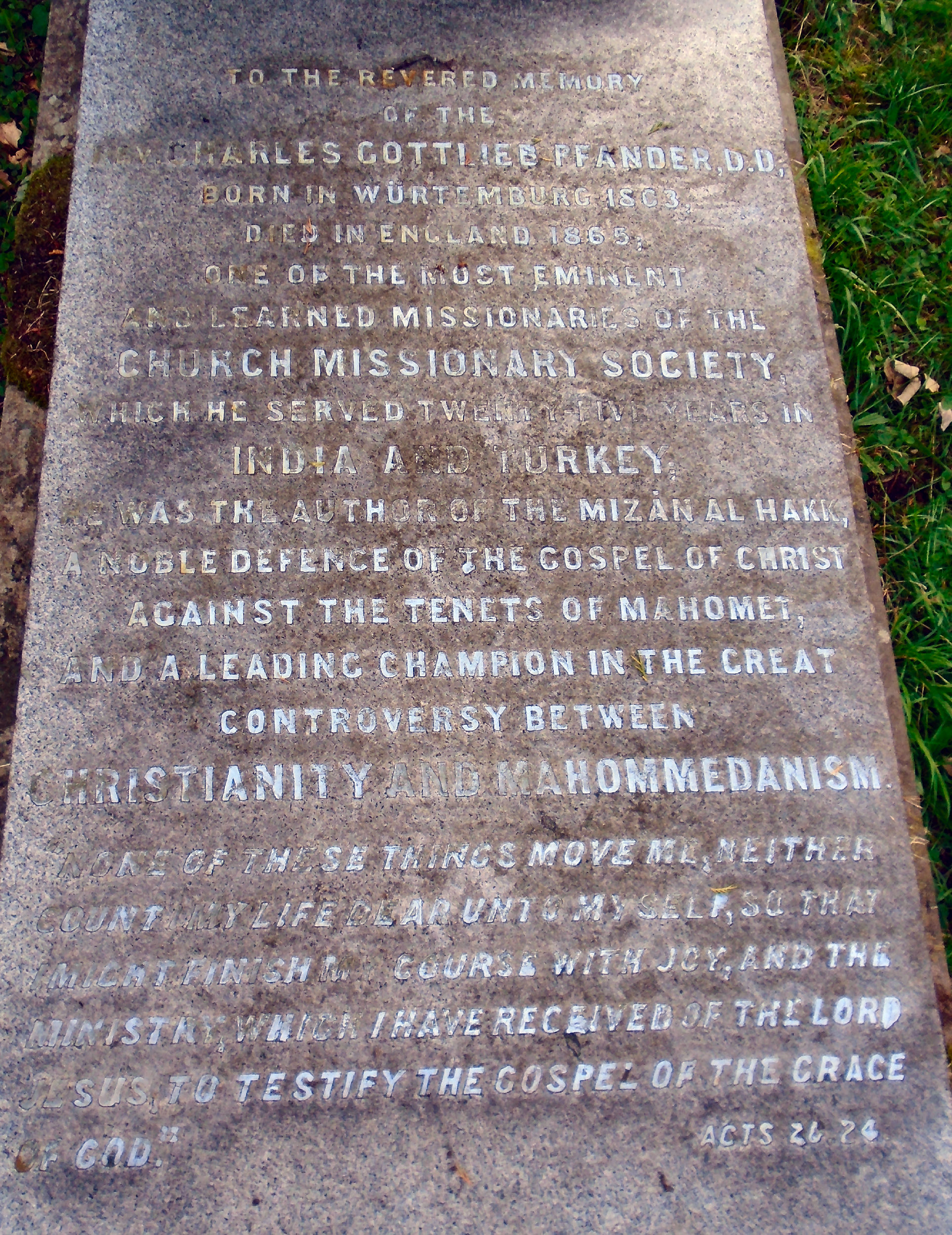

=== South Caucasus (1825–1836) ===
In 1825, after Pfander was ordained, he was stationed at Shusha, provincial-capital of Karabakh, Transcaucasus - also called South Caucasus - north of Russia, west of Turkey, and south of Iran - All of Azerbaijan. Pfander did missionary work in Karabakh and neighbouring lands. Out of several Basel Mission missionaries, some missionaries concentrated on reforming Armenian Orthodox Church, which they believed to be corrupt and bankrupt—one-third of the local population were Armenian Christians - this newly established province had migration of Armenian people before and after 1828 from Persia (present Iran).

Pfander, on behalf of Basel Mission concentrated in evangelizing and communicating Gospel to local Muslims—about two-thirds of local population were Muslims. Pfander believed that if Muslims read New Testament translated into Persian language, their preferred language, they would automatically abandon Islam and acknowledge its superiority and truth. For this, Pfander made several excursions to Iran and also spent a year at Baghdad, Iraq, to master Persian language. From 1825 to 1829, he worked in Shusha and neighbouring lands.

In 1835, Russia forbade all missionary operations in Shusha except those of the Greek church; consequently, he was forced to leave Shusha. He returned to Shusha in 1836 after he went to Istanbul in 1835, but left to Calcutta, India, in 1837.

=== Central Asia (1829–1835) ===
Between 1829 and 1831, he worked with Anthony Norris Groves in Baghdad, and for a year assisted Groves' efforts to establish a mission base and school there. From March 1831, he worked in Persia, and returned to Shusha. While working in Trans-Caucasus, he made several visits to Central Asia – Iran—to master the Persian language.

=== Colonial India: Agra Province (1841–1855) ===
With British parliament opening up for Protestant missionary activities in 1813 in India, several missionaries started operating in India that were under control of the East India Company. In 1814, the first Anglican bishop was secretly consecrated in Calcutta. From 1832, non-British missionaries were also allowed to operate in the Indian subcontinent. Agra, famous for Islamic learning and culture, had been transformed into an administrative centre for India's North-West province by the British government. Both Agra and Lucknow became home to missionaries who engaged in interfaith dialogue with the local Muslim ulema and published polemical books against the Islamic creed. Stationed here at the time included former Muslim convert to Christianity Abdul Masih and Joseph Wolff.

After a disastrous famine in 1837, a large orphanage was opened by the authorities in Agra and several orphaned children were taken in and subsequently baptized as Christians. With the financial success of the orphanage, the East India Company launched Orphan Press, employing the orphans at Agra. The success of Serampore Baptist Press for the East India Company in lower Bengal by Serampore Trio was soon replicated at Sikandra in the 1840s for printing Urdu and Persian tracts in criticism of Islam. This further escalated with the transfer of "Sadr courts" from Allahabad to Agra.

At the heart of this new publishing activity, CMS recruited Pfander, a German Pietistic Lutheran missionary with Swiss missionary training and considerable linguistic skills combined with experience in preaching on the Persian frontier (Central Asia). Pfander had been posted to Agra to evangelize Muslims and also to assist the already working German missionary colleagues, who like Pfander had been exiled from Central Asia by the Tsar's prohibition on any further Pietist missionary activity.

Pfander started to India in 1837 and arrived at Calcutta (present Kolkata) on 1 October 1838, due to closure of his previous mission station in the Russian Caucasus-South Caucasus. On his arrival, he had an impression that Muslims in India were on the verge of turning to Christianity; accordingly, he translated some of the books on Islam and Christianity which he had already written during the previous years into Urdu. Mizan al-Haqq was one such book that was used as starting point at Agra, and it was translated into several other languages of the Muslim world as well. With consent from the Basel Mission, he joined CMS on 12 February 1840.

In January 1841, the CMS posted Pfander to Agra in Northern India. After he took his new job at Agra, he immediately began engaging local Muslims through written letters, sending copies of the Persian and Arabic Bibles. The East India Company also posted administrators who were sympathetic to evangelicalism, such as James Thomason, the Lieutenant general of North-West Provinces, and William Muir. These new Company recruits provided unofficial support for Protestant missionary preaching, publishing, and educational initiatives. Stephen Wheler, a Colonel notorious for his provocative role in preaching to Sepoys at Barrackpore, meanwhile started a second orphanage at Fatehgarh (near Agra) in 1838 - with his departure, he handed over Orphanage maintenance to American Presbyterian missionaries. In 1854, under these circumstances, Pfander engaged in a famous public debate with leading Islamic scholars in Agra.

==== Pfander vs. Rahmatullah debate ====
While in India, he engaged with Muslim religious leaders in a famous public debate at Agra on 10 and 11 April 1854 at the invitation of Islamic scholar Rahmatullah Kairanawi. Several hundred Muslims and Christians gathered in the school room of Agra's Church Missionary Society to listen to a series of public debates between Pfander, a German CMS Protestant missionary, and Kairanawi, a Sunni theologian. Pfander supporters included British East Indian Company servants, who represented India's colonial power and its protection of European missionaries; Pfander's co-workers including Thomas Valpy French, who later became the first bishop of Lahore; local Christian converts from Islam, and representatives of the Anglican Church. Local Shi'ites and Sunni audiences; Muhammad Wazîr Khân, a physician in British-run medical hospital; and prolific Islamic writer and scholar Imad ud-din Lahiz were in the crowd on Kairanawi's side. Local Catholic missionaries were present as well.

Although the debate had been slated to address the topics of the Quran as the word of God, the Trinity and the sending of Muhammad, the debate centered around a single point, the authenticity of Christian scriptures. Pfander, well versed in the traditional argument, defended the integrity of the New Testament and Old Testament, while Kairanawi insisted that the Christian scriptures had been abrogated using the apocryphal 16th century Gospel of Barnabas as his main source, which he thought was the only authentic Gospel. Pfander was surprised by Kairanwi's use of European biblical critics.

William Muir, Secretary to the Government of the North West Provinces, described these debates between Pfander and Kairanawi in an article published by the "Calcutta Review," along with recent history of Christian mission to Muslims. Having observed the debate by himself, he later labeled these articles as The Mohammedan Controversy in 1897.

=== Colonial India: Peshawar (1855–1857) ===
In 1837 the CMS relocated Pfander to Peshawar, in the north-west frontier of India, where he continued his distribution of literature and his apologetics discussions. At the outbreak of the Indian Rebellion of 1857, he "went on preaching in the streets right through the most anxious time, when plots to murder all the Europeans were revealed by intercepted letters." That same year he received the degree of Doctor of Divinity from Cambridge University in recognition of his scholarship.

=== Istanbul (1858–1865) ===
He was sent as CMS missionary to Istanbul in 1859. When he arrived at Istanbul, many Turks showed interest in the doctrines of Christianity for the first few years. When in Istanbul, then the Ottoman capital, while he was on Middle Eastern mission, he commented:

If Istanbul were to be in the hands of a Christian government and a Christian people, it would with its unquestionably propitious surroundings be one of the most beautiful and fascinating places in the world.

The Turks soon retaliated violently against Christian missions, confiscating printing presses used by the missionaries, closed rooms and bookstores of the missionaries, including imprisonment of the missionaries, spurring the British government to interfere to free the missionaries. The mission never recovered, and forbade Istanbul for good.

== Legacy ==
Pfander's wrote Mizan ul-Haqq (The Balance of Truth), modelled on the style of Islamic theological works, and attempting to present the Christian gospel in a form understandable to Muslims. He said that the Bible is the inspired word of God, neither corrupted nor superseded, and that the Qur'an itself testifies to the reliability of the Christian scriptures and the supremacy of Christ. He said the Qur'an and other Islamic writings showed fallibilities in Islam and Muhammad, and that there was a historical contrast between the violence of Islamic expansion and the peaceable spread of the early church. The Mizan ul-Haqq stimulated a number of attempted refutations from Islamic scholars, followed by further writings from Pfander. It marked an important new phase in Muslim-Christian relations, when profound theological issues were addressed for the first time by recognised scholars.

In his history of the CMS, Eugene Stock said Pfander was "the greatest of all missionaries to Mohammedans." Temple Gairdner said that Pfander possessed the three great requisites for public controversy: absolute command of his subject, absolute command of the language, thought and manner of the people, and absolute command of himself. Samuel Zwemer said of his dogmatic and controversial methods that Christ and his apostles engaged in similar public debate with individuals and crowds.

== View of William Muir ==
William Muir, having arrived in India before Pfander, devoted his leisure time during and after his forty years of service at North-West province, to the study of early Islamic history and the writings of evangelical tracts for Muslims. Responding to Pfander's call for reliable account of the life of Muhammad, he began serious and detailed work on a biography The Life of Mohammet and History of Islam, where Muir explained Pfander's role in urging him to make available critical materials on the early sources of Islamic history.

We pass on to the consideration of Dr. Pfander's writings, which consist of three treatises: first, Mîzân-ul-Haqq, or "Balance of Truth"; second, Miftâh-ul-Asrâr, or "Key of Mysteries"; and third, Tarîq-ul-Hyât, or " Way of Salvation." They were originally written in Persian, but have also been published in Urdoo, excepting the last which is in progress of translation. From his residence and travels in Persia, Pfander possesses advantages which fortunately qualify him in an unusual degree for the great controversy with our Moslem population. He was attached for ten or twelve years to the German mission at Fort Shushy on the confines of Georgia, from whence he made frequent and protracted visits to Persia, penetrating as far as Bagdad, and returning by a circuitous tour through Isfahan and Teheran. In 1836, the Russian Government, unable to tolerate the presence of foreign ecclesiastics, put a stop to the mission, and thus proved the means of providing us with labourers who in the field of Persia had acquired so valuable a knowledge of its language and so intimate an acquaintance with the religion and tenets of the Mohammedans. Pfander joined the Indian mission of the C. M. S. in 1838..... The original Persian edition was published at Shushy in 1835, and the Urdoo translation was lithographed at Mirzapore in 1843.......

== Bibliography ==
Pfander wrote his own apologetic, entitled Mizan al-Haqq (The balance of truth), translated from German language entitled Waage der Wahrheit, as he was frustrated by the lack of evangelical literature against Islam. He used this work to support the statements of the Bible against the Islamic views of its textual corruption and attacked the veracity of Quran and Muhammed's prophethood. This work typified Pfander's role in shaping missionary controversy with Islam in the nineteenth century.

While in Shusha, he drafted Waage der Wahrheit, considered as a missionary classic, in the German language in May 1829. It had been translated later into Persian language entitled Mizan al-Haqq in 1835 at Shusha, and also into Armenian, Turkish, and Urdu languages afterwards. Urdu translation is done in 1843 at Mirzapur, Uttar Pradesh, after Pfander arrived India. It has been translated into English as The balance of truth. This work is considered as a cogent and incisive attack on Mohammedanism.

While in India, he engaged Muslim religious leaders in public disputations in Agra and Peshawar;

In 1840, he published Remarks on the Nature of Muhammedanism that dealt with popular Muslim faith, emphasizing the importance of Islamic traditions (hadith) in the ways Muslims interpret the Quran and practice their faith.

In 1844, he published Miftah al-Asrar (The key of mysteries) that presents an account of Jesus and the Trinity; and discusses the doctrines of the deity of Christ and the Trinity. He also published Tariq al-Hayat (The way of life) or Taríqu'l-hyát (The Path of Life) - presenting the Christian understanding of salvation against the Islamic understanding of sin.

== Sources ==
- Dann, Robert Bernard, Father of Faith Missions: the Life and Times of Anthony Norris Groves, (Authentic Media, 2004) ISBN 1-884543-90-1
- Powell, Avril Ann, Muslims and Missionaries in Pre-Mutiny India (Richmond, Curzon Press, 1993)
- Schirrmacher, Christine, "The Influence of German Biblical Criticism on Muslim Apologetics in the 19th Century",
