= Imdadullah Muhajir Makki =

Indian Islamic scholar (1817–1899)

A'la Hazrat Imdadullah Muhajir Makki

Personal life
- Born: 1814 Nanauta, North-Western Provinces, British India
- Died: 1899 (aged 81–82) Mecca, Hejaz Vilayet, Ottoman Empire

Religious life
- Religion: Islam
- Denomination: Sunni
- Jurisprudence: Hanafi
- Tariqa: Chishti; Naqshbandi
- Creed: Maturidi

Muslim leader
- Influenced by: Sayyid Ahmad Shahid
- Military career
- Service years: 1857
- Conflicts: Indian War of Independence: Battle of Shamli

Imdadullah Muhajir Makki (1817 – 1899) was an Indian Sunni Muslim scholar who was affiliated with the Deoband Madrasah movement. A Sufi saint of the Chishti and Naqshbandi orders, his prominent disciples included Muhammad Qasim Nanawtawi, Rashid Ahmad Gangohi, Khalil Ahmad Saharanpuri, and Ashraf Ali Thanwi. In the Indian Rebellion of 1857, he led the Muslims in Thana Bhawan to fight against the British. Imdadullah is also referred to by the Persian title A'la Hazrat.

With the aim of promoting social and educational upliftment of Muslims, Imdadullah Muhajir Makki motivated his pupils to establish Sunni seminaries and advance his reformist vision across the Indian subcontinent. With Hajji Imdadullah's support and spiritual guidance, many of his disciples established several influential madrasahs, such as Dar ul-Uloom Deoband, Mazahir ul-Uloom, Nadwat ul-Ulema (Lucknow), in additional to several smaller educational institutions.

== Early life ==
Imdadullah Muhaajir Makki was born in Nanauta, British India in 1817. His father Muhammad Amīn named him Imdad Hussain. However, Shah Muhammad Ishaq gave him the name of Imdādullah.

Aged seven, Imdādullah lost his mother who wrote her will that none shall touch her kid after her, and kept Imdādullah more beloved to her in those seven years; this became a hurdle that no one took care of Imdādullah's education. He then started memorizing the Quran on his own but failed to do so. Aged 16, he traveled to Delhi with Mamluk Ali Nanautawi to seek education.

== Religious work and travels ==
At the age of eighteen he gave bay'at to Nasiruddin ad-Dihlawi, a Khalifa of Sayyid Ahmad Shahid and a member of the Tariqat-i Muhammadiyah movement, who initiated him into the Naqshbandi tariqah. According to Imdadullah's account, while he was outwardly inducted into the Naqshbandi order by Nasiruddin ad-Dihlawi, his honorary and hidden spiritual initiation into the order occurred through the mediation of Sayyid Ahmad Barelwi:

"Externally, my initiation in the Tariqa-i Naqshbandiyya is from Mawlana Nasir al-Din al-Dahlavi, khalifa of Muhammad Afaq. But inwardly, it is without intermediary from the Prophet in the following way: I saw the Prophet on a high pedestal and shining with light and he was holding the hand of Sayyid Ahmad and I, out of respect, stood afar. Hazrat Sayyid Ahmad then took hold of my hand and placed it in the Prophet's hand."

Later he went to study under Mianji (Noor Mohammad Jhanjhanvi), another Khalifa of Sayyid Ahmad, who initiated him into the Chishti-Sabiri Sufi order. After Nur Muhammad's passed away in 1843, he began to avoid social company and spent extended periods in spiritual seclusion. After wandering in the wilderness for six months he was overcome by a strong urge to travel to Medina. On 7 December 1845, he arrived at Banares. From there, he departed for Ottoman Arabia for Hajj and pilgrimage of the tomb of shrine of Muhammad.

After the completion of his hajj, Imadadullah remained with Ishaq Muhajir Makki and others. Shah informed him that, after his pilgrimage to Medina, he should return to India. Sayyid Qudratullah Banarasi Makki sent several of his murids to accompany him to Medina.

== Freedom struggle against the British ==
In Thana Bhawan, the local Sunnis declared Imdadullah their leader. In May 1857 the Battle of Shamli took place between the forces of Imdadullah and the British.

== Disciples ==
Disciples include:

- Ahmad Hasan Amrohi
- Asghar Hussain Deobandi
- Ashraf Ali Thanwi
- Khalil ur-Rahman Saharanpuri
- Muhammad Qasim Nanautawi
- Rashid Ahmad Gangohi
- Muhammad Anwaarullah Farooqui
- Muhammad Yaqub Nanautawi
- Mahmud Hasan Deobandi
- Maulana Badruddin Phulwarvi
- Pir Mehr Ali Shah
- Sayyid Muhammad Abid
- Najib Ali Choudhury

== Marriages ==
Imdadullah married for the first time at the age of 48. After the death of his first wife, he married a blind widow. Because she was blind, she could not manage all household work, so she requested him to take another wife so all household work. Imdadullah then married for the 3rd time. None of his three wives bore him children.

== Literary works ==
His books include:

- Faisla Haft Masala
- Kulliyat-e-Imdadiya
- Hashiya Mathnavi Moulana Rumi: This is an annotation in Persian on the Mathnawi-i Ma’nawi by Rumi. During Imadadullah's lifetime, only two parts could be printed. The remainder was printed after his death.
- Ghiza-e-Ruh (The Nourishment of the Soul): Imadadullah wrote this book in 1264 AH. Mianji Noor Mohammad Jhanjhanvi is also discussed. It consists of 1600 verses of poetry.
- Ikleelul Quran (Tafseer Quran in Arabi). First Published in Bahraich by Taj Offcet Press formerly Aqeel Press NazirPura Bahraich
- Jihad-e-Akbar (The Greater Jihad): He composed this book in 1268 AH. It is a poetic work in Persian that he translated it into Urdu. It consists of 17 pages with 679 verses.
- Mathnavi Tuhfatul Ushshaq (Mathnavi – A Gift for Lovers): This consists of 1324 poetic verses and was compiled in 1281 AH.
- Risala Dard Ghamnak (The Treatise of Painful Sorrow): It consists of 5 pages with 175 verses.
- Irshad-e-Murshid (The Directive of the Murshid): This book deals with wadha'if, muraaqabaat, aurad, and shajaraat of the four silsilas. It was written in 1293 AH.
- Zia ul Quloob (Glitter of the Hearts): This book is in Persian. He wrote this kitab in Makkah in 1282 AH on the request of Hafiz Muhammad Yusuf, the son of Hafiz Muhammad Zamin.

== Death and legacy ==
Imdadullah died at Mecca in 1899. He was buried in the Jannat al-Mu'alla cemetery besides the grave of Rahmatullah Kairanwi. His biographical works include: Imdadul Mustaq Ila Asraful Akhlaq by Ashraf Ali Thanwi, Shamaem Emdadiya by Muhammad Murtaza Khan Qanauji.

== Eponyms ==
- Jamia Arabia Imdadul Uloom, Faridabad, Bangladesh

== See also ==
- Muhammad Mian Mansoor Ansari

== Bibliography ==
- Kugle, Scott (2007). Body Revived The Heart of Ḥājji Imdādullah', Sufis & Saints' Bodies: Mysticism, Corporeality, and Sacred Power in Islam. Chapel Hill, NC: University of North Carolina Press. ISBN 9781469602684.
- Mawlāna Abd al-Rashīd Arshad. "Hadhrat Hāji Imdādullah Muhājir Makki". In Deobandi, Nawaz (ed.). Sawaneh Ulama-e-Deoband (in Urdu). Vol. 1 (January 2000 ed.). Deoband: Nawaz Publications. pp. 342–376.
- Tareen, SherAli (2013). "FAYSALA-YI HAFT MAS'ALA (A RESOLUTION TO THE SEVEN CONTROVERSIES): Haji Imdadullah's Hermeneutics of Reconciliation". SAGAR: South Asia Graduate Research Journal. 21. hdl:2152/28002.
