= Izhar ul-Haqq =

Book of Rahmatullah Kairanvi

Izhar ul-Haq
- Author: Rahmatullah Kairanawi
- Language: Arabic

Iẓhār al-Ḥaqq (or Izhar-ul-Haq) (Arabic: إظهار الحق) is a book by Rahmatullah Kairanawi. Kairanwi had written this book in response to the allegations made by certain Christian missionaries against Islam and especially to counter the Mizan al-Haqq of Karl Gottlieb Pfander against Islam.

The book was originally written in Arabic in 1864, this six-volume book was later translated (or summarized) into English, Turkish, Urdu and Bengali. Christine Schirrmacher describes the book:

'The Demonstration of the Truth' (izhâr al-haqq) served as a summary of all possible charges against Christianity and was therefore used after al-Kairânawî's death as a sort of encyclopaedia since al-Kairânawî extended the material of former polemicists like Ali ibn Sahl Rabban al-Tabarî, Ibn Hazm or Ibn Taymiyya to a great extent.

== Sources ==
Kairanawi made use of Western Biblical criticism as well as theological works.

== Urdu translation ==
Late Maulana Akbar Ali Khan of Darul Uloom Karachi translated the book into Urdu. Taqi Usmani wrote commentary to it. He also wrote a preface to the book which now comes as a separate book, What is Christianity? The translation and commentary have been published in three volumes.
