= Wazir Khan (Tonk State) =

Ruler of the princely state of Tonk from 1834 to 1864

Muhammad Wazir Khan
- Nawab of Tonk

Nawab of Tonk State
- Reign: 1834–1836
- Predecessor: Amir Khan Pindari
- Successor: Muhammad Ali Khan
- Died: 1864; Tonk State, British Raj, modern day Rajasthan
- Issue: Muhammad Ali Khan
- Father: Amir Khan Pindari
- Religion: Islam
- Occupation: Commander of British Raj

Muhammad Wazir Khan (reigned 1834–1864) was the second ruler of the princely state of Tonk (in the present day Rajasthan state of India). He was the son of Muhammad Amir Khan whom he succeeded. During the Indian Rebellion of 1857 he allied himself with the British and repulsed rebels.

Preceded by Amir Khan	Nawab of Tonk; 1834-1864	Succeeded by Muhammad Ali Khan
