= Salarzai =

Tarkalanai Pashtun tribe

The Salarzai (Pashto: سالارزی) are one of the four Tarkani clans. They inhabit Afghanistan as well as what is now Buner District and Bajaur District in Khyber Pakhtunkhwa. In 2014, they may have been the majority tribe among the area's 600,000 population. In common with some other tribes of the area, it has been reported that they have formed militias to oppose the Taliban.

The Salarzai have a close connection to some inhabitants of the neighbouring Kunar Province.
