= Abdul Rauf Azhar =

Pakistani militant commander (born 1974)

Abdul Rauf Azhar Alvi
- Born: 1974; Bahawalpur, Punjab, Pakistan
- Relatives: Masood Azhar (brother)
- Military career
- Allegiance: Jaish-e-Mohammed; Harkat-ul-Mujahideen; Harkat-ul-Jihad al-Islami
- Rank: Supreme Commander of Jaish-e-Mohammed
- Conflicts: Kashmir conflict; Insurgency in Jammu and Kashmir; War in Afghanistan

Abdul Rauf Azhar Alvi (born 1974) is a Pakistani militant, the supreme commander of the jihadist Islamist militant group Jaish-e-Mohammed (JeM) and one of the brothers of JeM founder Masood Azhar. He took command of JeM on 21 April 2007, and is listed on the NIA Most Wanted.

He has been charged in multiple terrorist attacks in India including the 1995 kidnapping of western tourists in Kashmir, 2016 Pathankot attack, 2016 Uri attack and the 2019 Pulwama attack.

== Early life ==
He was born in Bahawalpur, Punjab, Pakistan in 1974 in a Saraiki family. He is one of 11 children, 4 brothers and 7 sisters, and is the younger brother of Jaish-e-Mohammad chief Masood Azhar. His father, Allah Bakhsh Shabbir, was the headmaster at a government-run school as well as a cleric with Deobandi leanings, and his family operated a dairy and poultry farm. He studied at the Jamia Uloom-ul-Islamia and is himself is known by the title of mufti. He took part in the Afghan Civil War (1992–1996) and later the Taliban insurgency during the War in Afghanistan (2001–2021). He became involved in the insurgency in Jammu and Kashmir in the 1990s. He had close ties to Khalid Sheikh Mohammed (the mastermind of the 9/11 attacks) and Aafia Siddiqui.

== Activities ==
=== Indian Airlines Flight 814 ===
He planned the hijacking of Indian Airlines Flight 814 with the support of Inter-Services Intelligence (ISI), Pakistan's main intelligence agency and the Taliban to secure the release of 36 Islamist jihadists held in prison in India – fellow Harkat-ul-Mujahideen members, especially his older brother Masood Azhar and including jihadists like Ahmed Omar Saeed and Mushtaq Ahmed Zargar. The hostage crisis lasted for seven days and ended after India agreed to release three jihadists out of 36.

In 2000, the jihadists formed a new organisation named Jaish-e-Mohammed (JeM) and have since been implicated in other militant actions, such as the 2001 Indian Parliament attack, 2002 kidnapping and murder of Daniel Pearl, 2008 Mumbai terror attacks, 2016 Pathankot attack and the 2019 Pulwama attack. Rauf is a wanted person in India for his involvement in terror attacks.

=== Kidnapping and murder of Daniel Pearl ===
Abdul Rauf is known to have been one of the co-conspirators in the kidnapping and subsequent murder of Daniel Pearl, an American journalist associated with The Wall Street Journal.

=== Command of Jaish-e-Mohammed ===
Azhar took command of Jaish-e-Mohammed on 21 April 2007, when his older brother, Masood Azhar its leader, went underground with the support of the ISI intelligence agency of Pakistan. According to US Treasury sanctions, he serves as the senior military commander for India, is JeM's intelligence coordinator, has organised suicide attacks in India, runs JeM's terrorist training camps, and is also a member of the group's political front.

=== 2009 Pakistan Army General Headquarter attack ===
In 2009, the BBC News reported that Abdul Rauf Azhar was one of the leaders summoned to Islamabad to help the Pakistani government negotiate with hostage-takers who had seized 42 civilians in an attack on the General Headquarters of the Pakistan Army.

== Sanctions ==
In 2010, the Office of Foreign Assets Control of the United States Treasury designated Abdul Rauf Azhar as a Specially Designated Global Terrorist under the Specially Designated Nationals and Blocked Persons List.

He is on the NIA Most Wanted list of India's National Investigation Agency. Interpol Red Notices have been issued against him on NIA's request seeking arrest for charges related to the 2016 Pathankot attack. India and the US moved the United Nations Security Council's ISIL (Da'esh) and Al-Qaida Sanctions Committee to sanction Abdul Rauf Azhar, this was blocked by China which asked for a hold on the move without particularly specifying a reason.

Rana Sanaullah, Minister of Law of Punjab, Pakistan, had said in 2016 that while JeM and Lashkar-e-Taiba were banned in Pakistan and that military actions under Operation Zarb-e-Azb to stop these militant organizations from operating against other countries had been taken, legal action against them was not possible, stating "When the state itself has been involved in a matter, how action can be taken on that basis against such banned organisations".

After the 2019 Pulwama attack, he and Masood Azhar's son Hammad Azhar were taken into custody by the Pakistan's Ministry of Interior.

== Affiliations ==
As JeM commander he has maintained strong ties with the Taliban, Al-Qaeda (including Khalid Sheikh Mohammed), Lashkar-e-Taiba (LeT), Difa-e-Pakistan Council (an umbrella coalition of anti-NATO religious and nationalist organisations in Pakistan), and the Inter-Services Intelligence-sponsored United Jihad Council, an umbrella organisation of 13–16 separatist insurgent organisations active in Jammu and Kashmir.

Rauf's brother, Masood Azhar, had made contacts in Britain who helped to provide training and logistical support for the terror plots, including "7/7, 21/7 and the attempt in 2006 to smuggle liquid bomb-making substances on to transatlantic airlines." Rashid Rauf, who was implicated in the 2006 transatlantic aircraft plot, was married to their relative.

Under Rauf and Masood's leadership, after Pakistan had joined the war on terror, the JeM split into two groups due to the brother's loyalty to the Pakistani government. Three JeM commanders, Abdul Jabbar, Maulana Umar Farooq and Abdullah Shah Mazhar, left the group and formed Jamaat ul-Furqan; led by Jabbar, the faction was joined by members of LeT, Lashkar-e-Jhangvi and Harkat-ul-Mujahideen. The remaining group that stayed with Masood Azhar used the name Khuddam ul-Islam. The Inter-Services Intelligence demanded Masood to rein in the rival faction after they began attacking Pakistani officials and civilians.

When the Musharraf government banned Khuddam ul-Islam and Jamaat-ul-Furqan, the groups carried out two assassination attempts on President Musharraf himself, on 14 and 25 December 2003. Masood Azhar's group, which stayed loyal to the Pakistani but had fallen into relative obscurity by 2004, was allowed to rebuild itself after the problematic portions of the leadership were purged. Pakistan in turn protected his group despite the official bans and the group continued to grow in Bahawalpur. The rival factions eventually realigned themselves with Tehrik-i-Taliban Pakistan (Pakistani Taliban) in 2007.

== Claims of death ==
According to reports in the Indian media, Azhar was killed in Bahawalpur, Pakistan on 7 May 2025 in an airstrike by the Indian Air Force, as a part of Operation Sindoor. Masood Azhar, who confirmed the death of 10 family members and 4 associates in a statement, did not list his brother's name among those killed. Other reports listing key terrorists claimed to have been killed in the strikes do not include his name.
