= 1994 kidnappings of western tourists in India =

Terrorist incidents in Delhi, India

- Location: Delhi, India
- Date: 29 September 1994–19 October 1994
- Weapon: Firearms (guns)
- Victims: 4
- Perpetrators: Harkat-ul-Ansar (Al-Hadid), including Ahmed Omar Saeed Sheikh

The 1994 kidnappings of western tourists in India were the abductions of four foreign tourists in Delhi, India, between 29 September and 20 October 1994, by terrorists. The kidnappings were perpetrated by the anti-Indian terrorist group Harkat-ul-Ansar (HuA), (Note: Harkat-ul-Ansar was the merger of Harkat-ul-Jihad-al-Islami and Harkat-ul-Mujahideen in 1993. Harkat-ul-Mujahideen had split from Harkat-ul-Jihad-al-Islami 1985 but re-united, they split again in 1998. Jaish-e-Muhammad was formed as a splinter group of Harkat-ul-Mujahideen by Masood Azhar in 2000.) under the pseudonym of Al-Hadid, led by Ahmed Omar Saeed Sheikh to secure the release of HuA leaders. Sheikh was caught and ultimately imprisoned at the Tihar Jail in Delhi. The abductees included three British citizens, Myles Croston, Paul Rideout, and Rhys Partridge, and one American, Béla Nuss; all of them were rescued unharmed by the police.

HuA would also perpetrate the 1995 kidnapping of western tourists in Kashmir where most of the hostages were killed with one being beheaded. Sheikh was released (along with Harkat leader Masood Azhar and Mushtaq Ahmed Zargar) in 1999 in exchange for hostages of Indian Airlines Flight 814 which had been hijacked by fellow Harkat members. He would go on to kidnap and allegedly murder Daniel Pearl in 2002.

== Background ==
A violent insurgency had been going on in Jammu and Kashmir since 1989. Kidnappings of foreign tourists had been attempted by Kashmiri Militants, most notably the attempt to kidnap seven Israelis in 1991. However, until this point the separatists had not kidnapped anybody outside of the disputed state.

Three of those kidnapped, Paul Benjamin Ridout and Christopher Miles Croston (both kidnapped on 16 October) and Rhys Partridge (Australian citizen of British heritage, kidnapped on 29 September), were from Great Britain and a fourth, Béla Nuss (kidnapped on 19 October), was an American citizen of Hungarian heritage from San Francisco; all were kidnapped at gunpoint.

== Kidnapping ==
The tourists were all befriended by young British Ahmed Omar Saeed Sheikh who was a member of Harkat-ul-Ansar and pretending to be an Indian under the name "Rohit Sharma". He told them that his uncle had died and left a village for him. He then invited them to visit the village with him. The three Britons were taken to a village near Saharanpur and kept captive there by his associates. Béla Nuss was the last to be kidnapped and was kept in Ghaziabad just outside Delhi. The kidnappers demanded that the Indian government free ten militants imprisoned in Kashmir and threatened to behead their captives if the demand was not met.

== Rescue ==
Béla Nuss was freed on 31 October by the police, while investigating a robbery, police came across the house where he was being kept captive. After information given to the police by Nuss about other hostages being held, police staked out the house, captured one of the drivers, and the interrogation of two terrorists, later arrested at the site, led them to the village of Saharanpur, where the Britons were being held captive. Omar Saeed was also captured and wounded when he had returned to the Ghaziabad house to talk to Nuss after being informed that he had stopped eating four days before. Two policemen and a militant were killed in a pre-dawn shoot-out at the second location on 1 November. All the tourists were freed unhurt.

== Aftermath ==
Three Pakistani militants belonging to Harkat-ul-Ansar were given death sentences and three others life sentences by a Delhi court in April 2002 for their roles in the kidnapping, while Sheikh's charges had been dropped in exchange for his release.

Ahmed Omar Saeed Sheikh was incarcerated in Tihar Jail and stayed in prison till December 1999 when he was released in exchange for the passengers aboard hijacked Indian Airlines Flight 814. He subsequently was alleged to be involved in the murder of Daniel Pearl. He was sentenced to death on 14 July 2002 in Pakistan. Under CIA interrogation Khalid Sheikh Mohammed confessed to being the one who personally wielded the blade that killed Daniel Pearl.

== In popular culture ==
The kidnapping was the subject of a 2008 episode of the television series, Banged Up Abroad. The Indian film Omerta (2017 film) is based on this kidnapping and Ahmed Omar Saeed Sheikh.

== See also ==
- 1995 kidnapping of western tourists in Kashmir
