= Sajjad Afghani =

Indian Mujahid

- Born: Muhammad Sajjad Khan; Rawalakot, Azad Jammu and Kashmir, Pakistan
- Died: 10 March 1999; Bhalwal, Jammu and Kashmir, India
- Burial place: Jammu, Jammu and Kashmir, India
- Citizenship: Pakistan
- Occupation: Militant
- Years active: 1984–1996
- Organization: Harkat ul-Ansar
- Known for: Militancy
- Title: Commander
- Opponents: Indian Military; CRPF
- Family: Sudhan
- Military career
- Conflicts: Soviet-Afghan War; Insurgency in Jammu and Kashmir

Muhammad Sajjad Khan (died 10 March 1999), commonly known as Sajjad Afghani, was a prominent Pakistani militant leader, who was commander-in-chief of Harkat-ul-Mujahideen. He was known as Sajjad Afghani, due to his participation in the Soviet-Afghan War. Khan was killed during an unsuccessful jailbreak from the Kot Bhalwal Jail on 10 March 1999.

== Early life ==
He was born in the village of Baibakh, Rawalakot, in the Poonch District of Azad Kashmir, Pakistan.

== Soviet–Afghan War ==
Sajjad Afghani joined the militancy under the banner of Harkat-ul-Mujahideen in the 1980s. He was well trained and remained involved in the Soviet–Afghan War. He stayed in Afghanistan until 1989.

== Commander in Chief ==
In 1991 he became Commander in Chief of Harkat Ul Ansar in Srinagar. In June 1994 he was arrested along with Molana Masood Azhar by the Indian Border Security Force. Lt. Gen. Arjun Ray, then Brigadier General Staff (BGS), described Afghani, a frail but visibly tough militant who had fought the Russians, as the "biggest catch" given his importance in militant circles.

== Death ==
According to Indian sources, Afghani was killed during an unsuccessful jailbreak from the Kot Bhalwal Jail on 10 March 1999. His death led to the hijacking of Indian Airlines Flight 814 in December by Harkat members, which led to the release of Masood Azhar, Ahmed Omar Saeed Sheikh and Mushtaq Ahmed Zargar by the Indian Government. The handover of his body had also been one of the initial demands of the hijackers.
