= Amjad Hossain (disambiguation) =

Amjad Hossain (1942–2018) was a Bangladeshi filmmaker.

Amjad Hossain (also spelled Amzad or Hussain) may also refer to:

- Amjad Hossain (lawyer) (c. 1935 – 2015), a Bangladeshi lawyer and politician
- Amjad Hossain (1924–1971), a Bangladesh Awami League politician
- Sardar Amjad Hossain (1940–1971), a Bangladesh Jatiya Party politician
- Gazi M M Amjad Hossain (1949–2021), a Bangladesh Awami League politician from Sirajganj
- Amjad Hussain (born 1958), a Pakistani Royal Navy officer
- Amjad Farooqi (1972–2004), a Pakistani Islamic militant
- Md. Amjad Hossain Talukdar, a Bangladesh Awami League politician from Kurigram
- Amjad Hussain B. Sial, a Pakistani diplomat
- Amzad Hossain Sarker, a Bangladesh Nationalist Party politician from Nilphamari
- Amzad Hossain (Meherpur politician), a Bangladesh Nationalist Party politician from Meherpur
- Amzad Hossain (Dinajpur politician) (died 2005), Bangladesh Awami League politician from Dinajpur
- Amjad Hussain Azar, Pakistani politician
- Amjad Farooqi (also known as Amjad Hussain), Pakistani militant

== See also ==
- Amjad
