= 1995 kidnapping of western tourists in Kashmir =

1995 kidnapping in Kashmir

- Location: Liddarwat, Jammu and Kashmir, India
- Date: 4 July 1995
- Attack type: Kidnapping, hostage taking
- Victims: 6
- Perpetrator: Harkat-ul-Ansar (Al-Faran)
- No. of participants: 40
- Motive: Release of Harkat-ul-Ansar leaders and other militants
- Website: Incident Summary for GTDID: 199507040010

Six western tourists and their two guides were kidnapped in the Liddarwat area of Pahalgam in the Anantnag district of Jammu and Kashmir, India on 4 July 1995 by forty militants from the Kashmiri Islamist militant organisation Harkat-ul-Ansar, (Note: Harkat-ul-Ansar was the merger of Harkat-ul-Jihad-al-Islami and Harkat-ul-Mujahideen in 1993. Harkat-ul-Mujahideen had split from Harkat-ul-Jihad-al-Islami 1985 but re-united, they split again in 1998. Jaish-e-Muhammad was formed as a splinter group of Harkat-ul-Mujahideen by Masood Azhar in 2000.) under the pseudonym of Al-Faran, in order to secure the release of Harkat leader Masood Azhar and other militants.

When their demands were not met, Norwegian Hans Christian Ostrø was beheaded on 13 August 1995. American John Childs managed to escape on 8 July, while the rest have never been found, but are presumed dead by the Government of Jammu and Kashmir issuing death certificates for the four on 28 January 2003.

== Background ==
In 1989, Kashmiri militants began an Insurgency in Jammu and Kashmir. Harkat-ul-Ansar (HuA), an anti-Indian militant group under the similar pseudonym of Al-Hadid, had already perpetrated the 1994 kidnappings of western tourists in India in Delhi, led by Ahmed Omar Saeed Sheikh to secure the release of HuA leaders. Sheikh was caught and ultimately imprisoned at the Tihar Jail in Delhi. HuA then began using the pseudonym of Al-Faran and also committed a bus hijacking in Hapatnar in Anantnag district under that name.

== Kidnapping ==
The six victims included two British tourists, Keith Mangan of Middlesbrough and Paul Wells of Blackburn; two Americans, John Childs of Simsbury, Connecticut, and Donald Hutchings of Spokane, Washington; a German student, Dirk Hasert (14 August 1969–c. 1995); and a Norwegian actor, Hans Christian Ostrø (1968-13 August 1995). Mangan's and Hutchings' wives were left behind by the kidnappers as their husbands were abducted.

A note released by the kidnappers a day after the kidnappings read, "Accept our demands or face dire consequences. We are fighting against anti-Islamic forces. Western countries are anti-Islam, and America is the biggest enemy of Islam." John Childs managed to escape and was rescued four days later. Ostrø was beheaded by his abductors and his body was found near Pahalgam on 13 August 1995. His body was taken to AIIMS, New Delhi, where a postmortem was conducted by Professor Tirath Das Dogra, who established that the beheading was the cause of death, and reported that the words "Al Faran" were carved onto his chest. The kidnappers demanded the release of Pakistani militant Masood Azhar, who had been imprisoned by India, and 20 other prisoners. Several national and international organisations issued appeals to Al-Faran to release the tourists. Representatives of the embassies of the victims' countries also visited Kashmir frequently to seek their release, without success. In December 1995, the kidnappers left a note that they were no longer holding the men hostage. Mangan, Wells, Hutchings, and Hasert have never been found and are presumed to have been killed.

In May 1996, a captured militant told Indian investigators and FBI agents that he had heard that all four hostages had been shot dead on 13 December 1995, nine days after an operation by Indian security forces that killed four of the original hostage-takers, including the man said to have been leading them, Abdul Hamid Turki. Journalists Adrian Levy and Catherine Scott-Clark claim however, in their book The Meadow, that the remaining hostages were sold from Al-Faran to Ghulam Nabi Mir, also known as Azad Nabi, who held them for months before shooting them dead on 24 December 1995. Ghulam Nabi Mir was at the time leader of pro-Indian Islamic guerrilla group Muslim Mujaheddin, a faction of Hizbul Mujahideen, who organized themselves into the All Jammu & Kashmir Patriotic Peoples Front in 1995 or 1996 to contest local elections.

Al-Faran has been determined to be a pseudonym of Harkat-ul-Ansar; however HuA has denied having any ties to it.

== Rescue attempt ==
According to the US-based Terrorism Research Center, Norwegian Forsvarets Spesialkommando (FSK) made an attempt to locate and rescue the Norwegian hostage Ostrø. "In 1995, a small force from the unit was deployed in the Kashmir region of India in an attempt to find and free a Norwegian citizen who was held hostage and later beheaded by the Al-Faran guerrillas." The attempt was not successful. The Terrorism Research Center presented the information about FSK's missions in Kashmir without prejudice. The Ministry of Defence (Norway) has never admitted such an action had taken place.

== Aftermath ==
The kidnappings were widely covered by western press and helped bring terrorism in Kashmir to the international communities attention. Donald Hutchings' wife Jane Schelly made repeated trips to the region to try to get some answers in vain. In 1997, Indian police exhumed a body that was initially thought to be of British tourist Paul Wells. However, subsequent forensic tests showed that the body did not belong to any of the tourists. Masood Azhar was subsequently released in exchange for passengers aboard hijacked Indian Airlines Flight 814 along with Ahmed Omar Saeed Sheikh. Sheikh was arrested in 2002 and was later tried and convicted for the kidnapping and beheading of Daniel Pearl in Karachi.

Amjad Farooqi, accused of being one of the kidnappers, was reported killed in Pakistan in September 2004.

== See also ==
- Ghazi Baba, Pakistani militant, suspected of involvement in the kidnapping
- 1994 kidnappings of western tourists in India
- Murders of Louisa Vesterager Jespersen and Maren Ueland, Danish and Norwegian tourists killed by Islamists in Morocco in 2018
- Decapitation in Islam
- Islamic terrorism

== Bibliography ==
- "Erneut Urlauber in Kaschmir vermisst", Süddeutsche Zeitung, 12 July 1995.
- "Entführer in Kaschmir drohen erneut mit Geiselmord". Associated Press Worldstream, 11 July 1995.
- Qaiser Mirza, "American Flees Captors in Kashmir", Chicago Sun-Times, 10 July 1995.
- "Kaschmir-Geiseln wurden in Dorf gesichtet", Associated Press, 31 December 1995.
- "Indien. Ein Grab im Dschungel", Focus Magazin, 30 December 1996.
- "Western Hostages probably killed, says top Indian security official", Associated Press, 27 November 1998.
- Qaiser Mirza, "Kashmir police say skeleton may be of a foreign hostage", Associated Press, 25 October 2000.
- "Indian police exhume body, believed to be of Western hostage", BBC Summary of World Broadcasts, 27 October 2000.
- "Kashmir issues death certificates for Western hostages kidnapped in 1995", Global News Wire – Asia Africa Intelligence Wire, 28 January 2003.
- Izhar Wani, "American Beheading in Iraq revives memories of similar execution in Kashmir", Agence France Presse, 12 May 2004.
- Qaiser Mirza, "Kashmiri Separatists Kill One Western Hostage, Threaten Other Four", Associated Press, 13 August 1995.
- Dirk Hasert, Geisel in Kaschmir. Berliner Zeitung, 16 August 1995.
- Warten auf ein Zeichen / Seit einem Jahr schweigen die Entführer in Kaschmir. Berliner Zeitung, 27 November 1996.
- Carvajal, Doreen (10 July 1995). "American tricks captors in Kashmir and bolts to freedom". The New York Times. ISSN 0362-4331.
- "-Spesialkommandoen skulle befri Osterø". vg.no (in Norwegian Bokmål). 23 September 2001.
- Vatn, Vegar (23 November 2020). "(+) Janne Hoem får Hans Christian Ostrøs minnepris: – Han satte uforglemmelige spor". Tønsbergs Blad (in Norwegian).
