= Deobandi jihadism =

Militant interpretation of Islam

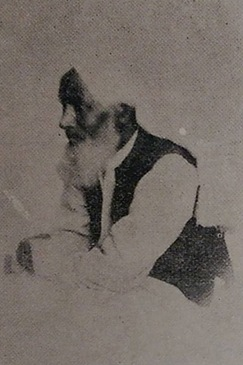
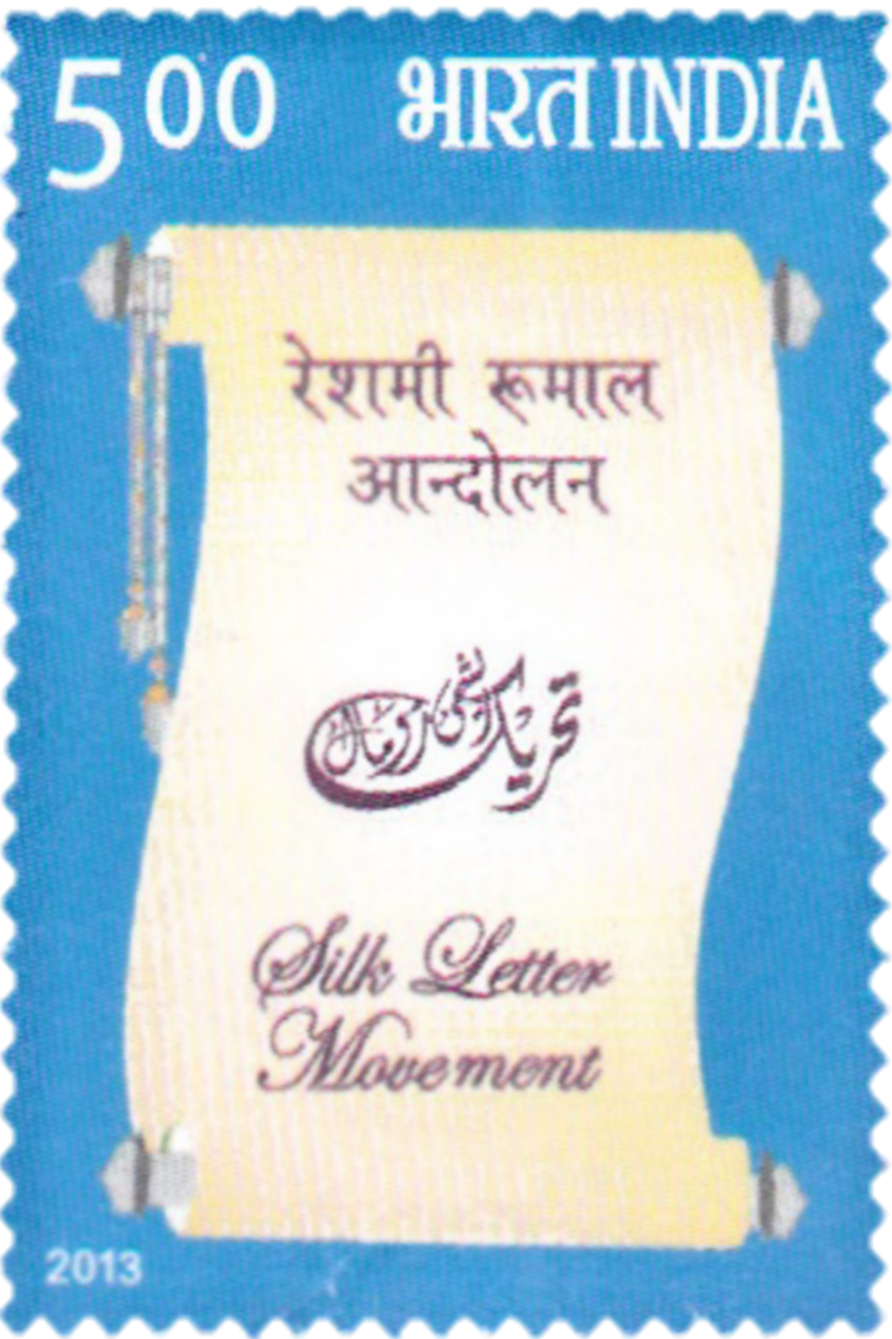
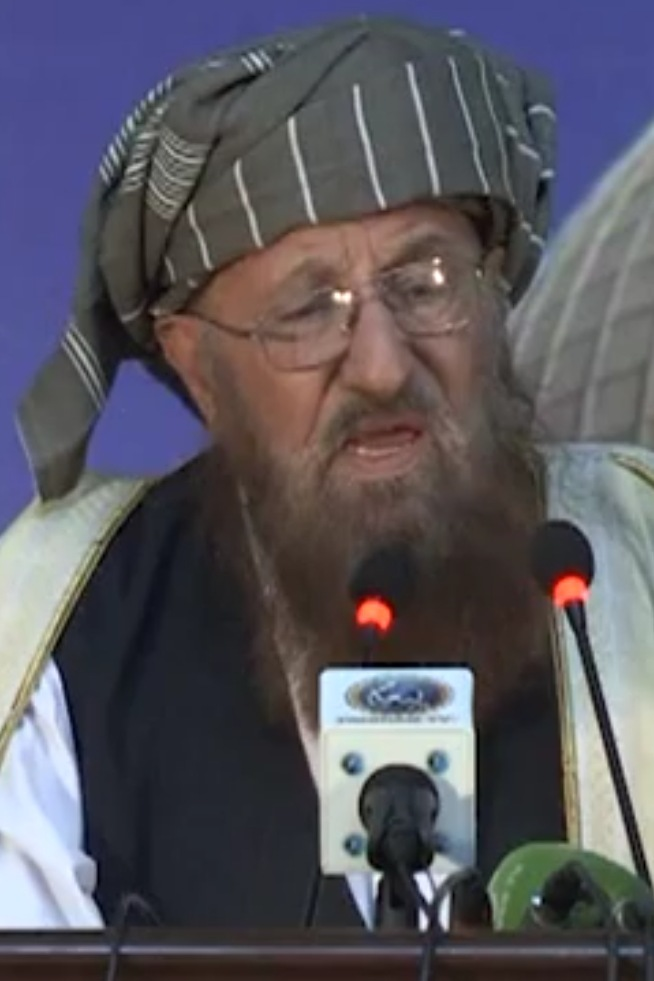
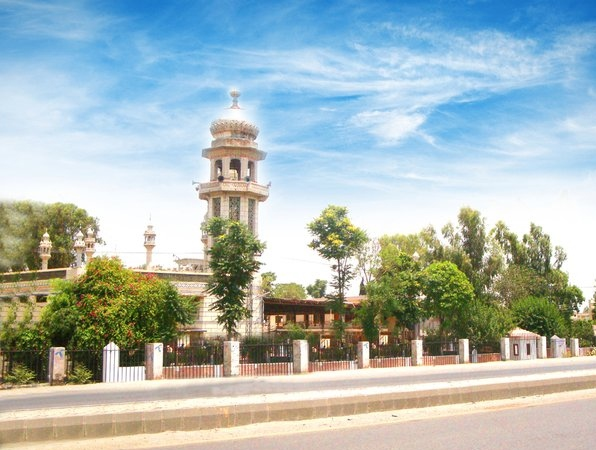
- Clockwise from top: Flag of the Islamic Emirate of Afghanistan, Silk Letter Movement, Darul Uloom Haqqania, Sami-ul-Haq, Mahmud Hasan Deobandi
- Leaders: Imdadullah Muhajir Makki, Muhammad Qasim Nanautavi, Rashid Ahmad Gangohi, Mahmud Hasan Deobandi, Sami-ul-Haq, Mullah Omar, Masood Azhar, Abdul Rauf Azhar, Hibatullah Akhundzada
- Active regions: British Raj (formerly), Afghanistan, Pakistan, Bangladesh, India

Deobandi jihadism is a militant and political interpretation of Islam that draws upon the teachings of the Deobandi movement, which originated in South Asia in the 19th century. The Deobandi movement underwent three waves of armed jihad. The first wave involved the establishment of an Islamic territory centered on Thana Bhawan by the movement's elders during the First Indian Revolution, before the founding of Darul Uloom Deoband. Imdadullah Muhajir Makki was the Amir al-Mu'minin of this Islamic territory; however, after the British defeated Deobandi forces in the Battle of Shamli, the territory fell. Following the establishment of Darul Uloom Deoband, Mahmud Hasan Deobandi led the initiation of the second wave. He mobilized an armed resistance against the British through various initiatives, including the formation of the Samratut Tarbiat.

When the British uncovered his Silk Letter Movement, they arrested Deobandi and imprisoned him in Malta. After his release, he and his disciples entered into mainstream politics and actively participated in the democratic process. In the late 1979, the Pakistan–Afghan border became the center of the Deobandi jihadist movement's third wave, which was fueled by the Soviet–Afghan War. Under the patronage of President Zia-ul-Haq, its expansion took place through various madrasas such as Darul Uloom Haqqania and Jamia Uloom-ul-Islamia. Jamiat Ulema-e-Islam (S) provided political support for it. Trained militants from the Pakistan–Afghan border participated in the Afghan jihad, and later went on to form various organizations, including the Taliban. The most successful example of Deobandi jihadism is the Taliban, who established Islamic rule in Afghanistan. The head of the Jamiat Ulema-e-Islam (S), Sami-ul-Haq, is referred to as the "father of the Taliban".

== Definition ==
Deobandism is a term used to describe the teachings and practices of the Deobandi movement, which originated in the town of Deoband in South Asia in the late 19th century. The Deobandi movement emerged as a response to colonialism and the perceived threat of cultural and religious domination by Western powers in India. The Deobandi movement is known for its emphasis on Islamic scholarship, piety, and adherence to the Hanafi school of Islamic law. Deobandis reject the use of innovation (Bid'ah) in religious practice and emphasize following the example of Muhammad as closely as possible.

Jihad is an Arabic word that means "struggle" or "effort." In Islamic terminology, it refers to the struggle to uphold the values and principles of Islam, which can take various forms, including spiritual, moral, and physical. The concept of Jihad is rooted in the Quran and Sunnah (the sayings and actions of Muhammad) and has been interpreted and applied in different ways throughout Islamic history. In its physical sense, Jihad refers to the struggle to defend Islam and the Muslim community (ummah) against aggression and oppression. This can take the form of defensive warfare in cases where Muslims are under attack or facing persecution, but it also includes other forms of resistance and activism aimed at promoting justice and protecting the rights of the oppressed. Jihadism is a term used to describe a modern, militant interpretation of the concept of Jihad in Islam that emphasizes the use of force to achieve political and religious goals. Jihadists believe that the entire world is divided into two opposing camps: the Islamic camp and the non-Islamic camp, and that it is the duty of all Muslims to engage in a perpetual struggle (jihad) to establish an Islamic state or caliphate. Jihadism emerged in the 20th century as a response to political and social issues facing the Muslim world, including colonialism, authoritarianism, and the failure of secular nationalist movements to address the needs and aspirations of Muslim populations.

Since the Soviet–Afghan War, some Deobandi groups have been linked to militant activity in different regions, such as Afghanistan and Pakistan. However, the vast majority of Deobandis do not engage in militant activities and are committed to peaceful and constructive engagement with the wider world.

== History ==
=== Fall of Muslim rule in India and Indian Rebellion of 1857 ===
In 1600, Elizabeth I of England granted a charter to the East India Company, giving it the privilege to conduct trade in the Orient. The company later secured the right to trade in Surat from the Mughal administration in 1612. In 1615, with the approval of Mughal Emperor Jahangir, the company established trading posts on both the western and eastern coasts of South India. Over time, the East India Company steadily expanded its trade and political influence throughout India. The company's rule over India began in 1757 when it defeated the Siraj ud-Daulah in the Battle of Plassey.

By the 12th century, the Indian subcontinents had been under the control of Muslim rulers. However, the power of the Muslims began to wane, and the British eventually took over, which was viewed by Indian Muslim scholars as undermining the economic, social, and political power of Muslim society in India. Shah Waliullah Dehlawi initiated efforts to revive the Muslim community in India, which he viewed as being in decline. Following his death, his son, Shah Abdul Aziz Dehlavi, carried on his work, declaring jihad as a duty to save India and issuing a fatwa to that effect. To lead this movement, he selected Syed Ahmad Barelvi, who was later killed in the Battle of Balakot in 1831 along with his disciple Shah Ismail Dehlvi. Despite these losses, the movement of Muslims in India continued to persist.

In 1857, it took the form of the Indian Rebellion. During this time, an independent Islamic territory was briefly established in the Thana Bhawan area of the Saharanpur district in Uttar Pradesh. The temporary government that was formed in this area was led by Chief Justice Rashid Ahmad Gangohi, Commander in Chief Muhammad Qasim Nanautavi, and Amir al-Mu'minin Imdadullah Muhajir Makki. On September 14, 1857, the Battle of Shamli was fought against the British under the leadership of this temporary government, in which Hafiz Muhammad Zamin was killed in action. The leadership subsequently went into hiding, and the government of the independent Thana Bhawan ultimately fell. Despite the failure of the Indian Rebellion, it marked a turning point in British colonial rule and paved the way for significant changes in the administration of India. The British government responded to the rebellion by offering rewards for the capture of Imdadullah Muhajir Makki, Muhammad Qasim Nanautavi, and Rashid Ahmad Gangohi. In 1858, the Government of India Act put an end to the East India Company's rule in India and established direct control of the British Crown over the country. After a long period of hiding, Imdadullah Muhajir Makki was eventually able to emigrate to Mecca in 1859. A few days later, when a general amnesty was declared, Muhammad Qasim Nanautavi and Rashid Ahmad Gangohi were released from hiding and resumed their activities.

In 1857, it was propagated that the British had won the war on behalf of God. In an effort to persuade and encourage the common people to convert to Christianity, they sought to change the educational system. This resulted in Indian Muslims being exposed to non-Muslim and Western influences, leading to a decline in Muslim educational institutions (which declined from a lack of patronage) and culture. In this situation, with the goal of creating activism and awareness about Islam and the Indian independence movement, a group of individuals under the guidance of Imdadullah Muhajir Makki and the leadership of Muhammad Qasim Nanautavi founded Darul Uloom Deoband on May 30, 1866. The institution was established under a pomegranate tree in the courtyard of the Chatta Mosque in the Saharanpur district of Uttar Pradesh, India. The founding members included those who had participated in the Indian Rebellion of 1857.

=== Mahmood Hasan Deobandi and Silk Letter Movement ===
Mahmud Hasan Deobandi, the first student of Darul Uloom Deoband, later became its principal and actively incited armed rebellion through his students. Upon being appointed as a teacher at Darul Uloom Deoband, he founded the Samratut Tarbiat in 1878. The organization's stated purpose was to establish relationships with empathetic individuals who supported the development of Darul Uloom Deoband. However, its hidden purpose was to create a militant organization with the aim of overthrowing British rule via armed rebellion. If this purpose were revealed, the organization could have been completely destroyed through legal means, as its activities were highly secretive. In 1880, the organization's patron, Muhammad Qasim Nanautavi, died, resulting in a leadership vacuum and the organization's failure to achieve its objectives. Thirty years later, in 1909, Mahmud Hasan Deobandi established a new organization named Jamiatul Ansar.

The Jamiatul Ansar's efforts to elevate the status of the Ulama class in Indian politics garnered the attention of the British Government. Two major conventions were held, drawing large crowds, which raised suspicions among the British that Muslims were plotting to launch a revolt. Consequently, the colonial government was wary of providing a platform for the influential Muslim community to participate in political affairs through the Ulama. Despite their reservations, they closely monitored Jamiatul Ansar. The first chairman of the Jamiatul Ansar conference, Ahmad Hasan Amrohi, was questioned, and Mahmud Hasan Deobandi was subjected to heavy taxation. During this time, some leaders of Darul Uloom Deoband disagreed with Ubaidullah Sindhi, resulting in disputes that justified breaking off the relationship with Darul Uloom. Nonetheless, Mahmud Hasan Deobandi maintained a secret and unbreakable relationship with Ubaidullah Sindhi, meeting him outside the Deoband area to exchange advice and provide guidance for necessary activities. After leaving Darul Uloom Deoband, Ubaidullah Sindhi resigned from his position in Jamiatul Ansar, leading to the organization's gradual weakening. Following Mahmud Hasan Deobandi's guidance, Ubaidullah Sindhi established the institution Nazaratul Maarif Al Qurania in Delhi.

Mahmud Hasan Deobandi aimed to overthrow the British Raj in India, and to achieve this goal, he focused on two geographic areas. The first area was the autonomous tribes living between Afghanistan and India, and the second area was within India itself. He aimed to influence sincere leaders who cared for their communities to support his cause, and he was quite successful in this regard. Scholars who worked on the first front included his students and companions, such as Abdul Ghaffar Khan, Abdur-Raheem Sindhi, Muhammad Mian Mansoor Ansari, Ubaidullah Sindhi, and Uzair Gul Peshawari. They propagated Hasan's program into the frontier areas and among the autonomous tribes. Scholars who worked on the second front included Mukhtar Ahmed Ansari, Abdur-Raheem Raipuri, and Ahmadullah Panipati. The program was designed to prepare the people inside India for a rebellion if the Afghan and Ottoman governments provided military aid, and if people within the country rose up during the invasion by this army. Yaghistan was the center of the movement of Mahmud Hasan, and the Provisional Government of India was designed by Hasan's pupil Ubaidullah Sindhi and his companions, with Mahendra Pratap appointed as the President. Hasan himself traveled to Hejaz to secure German and Ottoman support in 1915. He left Bombay on 18 September 1915, accompanied by scholars including Muhammad Mian Mansoor Ansari, Murtaza Hasan Chandpuri, Muhammad Sahool Bhagalpuri, and Uzair Gul Peshawari. On 18 October 1915, he went to Mecca, where he had meetings with Ghalib Pasha, the Ottoman governor, and Anwar Pasha, the Ottoman defense minister. Ghalib Pasha assured him of assistance and gave him three letters, one addressed to the Indian Muslims, the second to the governor Busra Pasha, and the third to Anwar Pasha. Hasan also had a meeting with Djemal Pasha, the governor of Syria, who concurred with what Ghalib Pasha had said. Hasan feared that if he returned to India, he might be arrested by the British, so he asked that he be allowed to reach the Afghanistan border from where he could reach Yaghistan. Djemal made an excuse and told him that if he feared arrest, he could stop at Hejaz or any other Ottoman-controlled area. Subsequently, the program called the Silk Letter Movement was leaked, and its members were arrested. Hasan was arrested in December 1916 alongside his companions and students, Hussain Ahmad Madani and Uzair Gul Peshawari, by Hussein bin Ali, the Sharif of Mecca, who revolted against the Ottomans and allied with the British. The Sharif then handed them over to the British, and they were imprisoned in the Fort Verdala in Malta. After the release of Mahmood Hasan Deobandi, he and his disciples entered into mainstream politics and actively participated in the democratic process.

=== Soviet–Afghan War and rise of Deobandi jihadism ===
The Soviet–Afghan War was a conflict that lasted from 1979 to 1989, fought between Soviet forces and Afghan resistance fighters known as the Mujahideen. The conflict had its roots in the political and social instability that had plagued Afghanistan since the late 1970s. In 1978, the People's Democratic Party of Afghanistan (PDPA) took power in a military coup known as the Saur Revolution, overthrowing the Republic of Afghanistan led by Mohammed Daoud Khan, who himself overthrew his brother Mohammed Zahir Shah in a 1973 coup against the Kingdom of Afghanistan. The new government, which was supported by the Soviet Union, implemented a series of controversial reforms, including land redistribution and the abolition of traditional Islamic practices. The reforms were deeply unpopular with many Afghans, particularly the country's conservative rural population, who felt that their way of life was being threatened. This led to a growing resistance movement against the PDPA government, which was largely made up of Islamist groups and tribal leaders. In December 1979, the Soviet Union, concerned about the growing instability in Afghanistan and the threat to its own security after Nur Muhammad Taraki was murdered by Hafizullah Amin, sent troops into the country to support the PDPA government. The intervention was met with widespread resistance from the Afghan population, and a long and bloody conflict ensued. The Soviet military, which was initially confident of victory, faced a determined and resourceful resistance from the Mujahideen, who were able to receive financial and military aid from the United States, Saudi Arabia, and other countries.

During this war, under the leadership of General Zia-ul-Haq, Pakistan underwent a process of Islamization, which was aimed at making the country a more Islamic state. Zia-ul-Haq, who came to power in a military coup in 1977, was a devout Muslim who believed that Pakistan should be a state that was based on Islamic principles and values. He played a significant role in the Soviet–Afghan War, both in terms of providing support to the Afghan Mujahideen and in terms of strengthening Pakistan's relationship with the United States. As a devout Muslim, Zia-ul-Haq was deeply opposed to the Soviet presence in Afghanistan and saw the conflict as a struggle between the forces of Islam and communism. He was a strong supporter of the Afghan resistance and provided the Mujahideen with training, weapons, and other forms of support through Pakistan's intelligence agency, the Inter-Services Intelligence (ISI). Zia-ul-Haq's support for the Afghan resistance was also tied to his broader foreign policy objectives, which included strengthening Pakistan's strategic relationship with the United States. The United States was also deeply opposed to the Soviet presence in Afghanistan and saw the conflict as part of the larger Cold War struggle between the West and the Soviet Union. Through its support for the Afghan resistance, Pakistan was able to deepen its ties with the United States and receive significant military and economic aid. The United States, in turn, saw Pakistan as a key partner in its efforts to counter Soviet influence in the region.

In Pakistan, the majority of the population follows the Deobandi school of thought, which has resulted in a majority of madrassas being affiliated with this doctrine. During the process of Islamization in Pakistan, General Zia, who was himself a Deobandi, focused on implementing Sunni policies and laws that aligned with the Deobandi school of thought. The number of madrassas increased during Zia's regime, which coincided with the Soviet Union's invasion of Afghanistan. As part of the Islamization process, General Zia incorporated Islamic laws and principles into the constitution and formed alliances with various religious and political parties, including the Jamiat Ulema-e-Islam (S). The Ulema of JUI (S) worked to further entrench the Deobandi school of thought in madrassas. Zia was particularly focused on promoting the Deobandi approach, which led to a significant increase in the growth of madrassas in Pakistan during his reign. The leader of Jamiat-Ulama-e-Islam (S), Sami-ul-Haq, also known as the "Father of the Taliban," was a prominent Pakistani religious scholar and politician who was a proponent of the Deobandi school of thought. He was a close associate of General Zia-ul-Haq and played an instrumental role in promoting the Deobandi approach in Pakistan. During Zia's regime, Samiul Haq was appointed to various political positions, including as a senator and as the head of the Darul Uloom Haqqania, which is known for its close ties to the Taliban. Through the joint efforts of General Zia and Jamiat Ulema-e-Islam (S), a number of Deobandi madrasas were established along the Pakistan-Afghanistan border. These institutions offered military training to individuals who later joined the Soviet–Afghan War as Mujahideen. The outcome of this training was the emergence of several organizations, including the Taliban, which marked the onset of the third wave of Deobandi jihadism.

== Activities ==
=== Afghanistan ===
The Soviet–Afghan War ended in 1989, when the last Soviet troops withdrew from Afghanistan. The war had lasted for over nine years and had resulted in the deaths of thousands of Afghans and Soviet soldiers. After the Soviet withdrawal, the Mujahideen, a loose coalition of Afghan rebel groups, took control of much of the country. However, the Mujahideen were not able to establish a stable government, and Afghanistan descended into a period of civil war. The Mujahideen were made up of various factions, many of which were united only in their opposition to the Soviet-backed government that had been in power prior to the Soviet invasion. These factions had differing ideologies and goals, and many of them continued to fight each other for control of Afghanistan after the Soviet withdrawal. However, their inability to establish a stable government after the Soviet withdrawal contributed to the rise of the Taliban, which was able to take control of much of the country and establish a new government based on Islamic law.

The Taliban was formed in Afghanistan in the mid-1990s, the founder of the Taliban was Mullah Muhammad Omar, a former mujahideen fighter who had lost an eye during the war against the Soviet Union. In 1994, he gathered a group of Islamic students and religious scholars, many of whom had received their education in Deobandi madrasahs located in Khyber Pakhtunkhwa and Balochistan, and established the Taliban as a political and military movement. The Taliban quickly gained support from many Afghans who were tired of the violence and instability that had plagued the country for years. They were able to take control of much of Afghanistan, eventually capturing the capital city of Kabul in 1996. Under the Taliban's rule, Afghanistan was run according to a strict interpretation of Islamic law. However, the group continued to maintain control of Afghanistan until they were ousted by US-led coalition forces in 2001, following the September 11 attacks.

The Islamic Emirate of Afghanistan is the name the Taliban gave to their government during their previous rule of Afghanistan from 1996 to 2001. After the US-led invasion of Afghanistan in 2001, the Taliban were removed from power, and the Islamic Emirate of Afghanistan was dissolved. However, over the next 15 years, the Taliban continued to operate as an insurgency, carrying out attacks against US and coalition forces, as well as against the Afghan government. In August 2021, the Taliban regained control of Afghanistan and declared the re-establishment of the Islamic Emirate of Afghanistan, the same name they used for their previous government from 1996 to 2001. Since then, the Taliban has been in control of the country, and they have set up a new government led by their own members. The Taliban has declared that Afghanistan will be ruled under Islamic law.

=== Pakistan and Kashmir ===
During the Soviet–Afghan War in the 1980s, FATA became a crucial base of operations for the Mujahideen, who were fighting against Soviet forces in Afghanistan. After the end of the war, many of the Mujahideen fighters returned to FATA and some of them shifted their focus to the Kashmir conflict and established their own militant organizations like Jaish-e-Mohammed, Harkat-ul-Mujahideen, Harkat-ul-Jihad al-Islami and slowly infiltrated Indian-administered Jammu and Kashmir from Pakistan-administered Azad Kashmir across the Line of Control with the goal of spreading a radical Islamist ideology to wage jihad against India in the region. The Pakistani Inter-Services Intelligence supported and supplied arms as well as provided training to these "mujahideen" militants. In 2015, former President of Pakistan, Pervez Musharraf, admitted that the Pakistani state had supported and trained insurgent groups in Kashmir throughout the 1990s. These new Islamist militant groups changed the ideological emphasis of the Kashmir conflict from that of plain separatism to Islamic fundamentalism. The ongoing insurgency in Jammu and Kashmir between Kashmiri separatists and Indian security forces in Kashmir has led to a large number of casualties on both sides.

One other such group is the Pakistani Taliban, which emerged in the early 2000s and quickly gained a foothold in FATA, it emerged as the Deobandi jihadist group.The Pakistani Taliban, also known as the Tehrik-i-Taliban Pakistan (TTP), is a loosely organized coalition of various militant groups, with the goal of establishing Islamic rule in Pakistan and overthrowing the Pakistani government. The relationship between the Pakistani government and the TTP has been contentious, with the government launching a number of military operations to try to weaken the group. In recent years, there have been some efforts to initiate peace talks between the Pakistani government and the TTP, but these have largely been unsuccessful.

=== Bangladesh ===
The Deobandi and Salafi jihadist factions emerged in Bangladesh during the Soviet-Afghan war and have an extensive network of organisations. When a network of 30 different jihadist factions was established and expanded in the following years within participating in Soviet-Afghan war the networks majorly influenced and expanded after the Soviet-Afghan war many indian experts believe that the networks are established under the alleged support of Pakistan's main intelligence agency to increase radical Islamist ideology in Bangladesh, end Indian influence and target Indian assets in the country; attacks increased against India after the Soviet-Afghan war. The main goal of most Islamist groups like Harkat-ul-Jihad al-Islami, Jamaat-ul-Mujahideen, Allah'r Dal and many various Islamist militant groups is to create Bangladesh as an Islamic state governed under Sharia law.There was a period of turbulence in Bangladesh between 2013 and 2016 where attacks on a number of secularist and atheist writers, bloggers, and publishers in Bangladesh; foreigners; homosexuals; and religious minorities such as Hindus, Buddhists, and Christians were seen, People accused of attacks on Islam and Muhammad were killed, as the government took no action to calm the situation and bloggers kept writing about Muhammad. The Jamaat-ul-Mujahideen aim is to replace the government of Bangladesh with an Islamic state based on Sharia Law. It has explicitly stated on more than one occasion that it opposes the political system of Bangladesh and ostensibly seeks to "build a society based on the Islamic model laid out in Holy Quran and Hadith." The Harkat-ul-Jihad al-Islami, Jamaat-ul-Mujahideen, Allah'r Dal have strong links with Al-Qaeda and they follows the ideals of the Taliban of Afghanistan. Its chief has been quoted as stating that "our model includes many leaders and scholars of Islam. But we will take as much (ideology) from the Taliban as we need." It opposes democracy as being in violation of Sharia or Islamic law They have claimed responsibility for several violent attacks and bombings in Bangladesh and India.

=== Iran ===
In Iran, the Jaysh al-Adl is the main Deobandi jihadist organization. It conducts attacks against the Iranian government mainly in the Sistan and Baluchestan province.

== Criticism ==
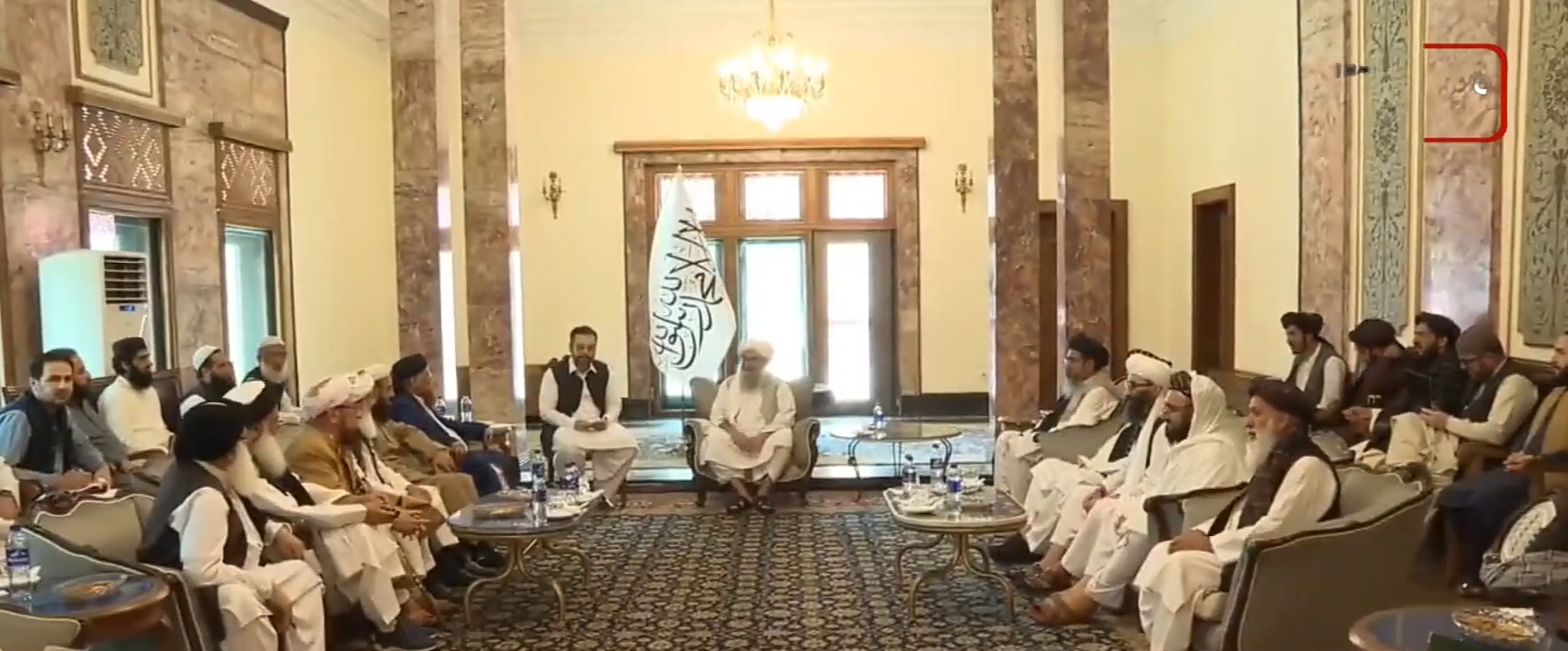
Taqi Usmani in Afghanistan, with Prime minister Hasan Akhund

Taqi Usmani is considered the intellectual head of the contemporary Deobandi movement and a former judge on the Federal Shariat Court of Pakistan. He has praised the Taliban's ability to "break the shackles of slavery" and "re-establish Islamic rule" in Afghanistan, and he has presented their victory as an example alongside the conquest of Mecca. According to him, the Taliban's triumph is a sign of the "resurrection of the Islamic Ummah" and a victory of "true Islam." However, Taqi Usmani has been critical of the Pakistani Taliban's violent activities in Pakistan, including suicide bombings and attacks on civilians. He has urged the TTP to follow a more peaceful path and has condemned their use of violence in the name of Islam. Additionally, he refers to the Pakistani Taliban as "rebels." In a related matter, the National Commission for Protection of Child Rights (NCPCR) in India objected to alleged "anti-India" content on the Darul Uloom Deoband website, claiming that references to Ghazwa-e-Hind could incite hostility. Darul Uloom Deoband clarified that the content was a 2009 response to a query about a hadith, not a fatwa, and stated it neither encouraged hatred nor influenced children against their nation.

== See also ==
- Index of Deobandi movement–related articles
