= Ahmed Omar Saeed Sheikh =

British Islamist (born 1973)

- Born: 23 December 1973 (age 52); London, England, UK
- Education: Forest School
- Alma mater: London School of Economics (dropped out)
- Organizations: Harkat-ul-Ansar; Harkat-ul-Mujahideen; Jaish-e-Mohammed
- Known for: 1994 kidnappings of Western tourists in India; Kidnapping and murder of Daniel Pearl
- Criminal charges: Kidnapping, murder
- Criminal penalty: 7 years imprisonment (for kidnapping); Death (for murder), overturned
- Criminal status: Imprisoned at Kot Lakhpat Jail
- Spouse: Saadia Rauf (m. 2000–present)
- Children: 1 (son)

Ahmed Omar Saeed Sheikh (Urdu: احمد عمر سعید شیخ; sometimes known as Umar Sheikh, Sheikh Omar, (Note: Note that this term is more commonly used in reference to Sheik Omar Abdel-Rahman) Sheik Syed or by the alias Mustafa Muhammad Ahmad; born 23 December 1973) is a British Pakistani terrorist. He became a member of the Islamist jihadist group Harkat-ul-Ansar or Harkat-ul-Mujahideen in the 1990s, and later of Jaish-e-Mohammed and was closely associated with Al-Qaeda. (Note: Harkat-ul-Ansar was the merger of Harkat-ul-Jihad-al-Islami and Harkat-ul-Mujahideen in 1993. Harkat-ul-Mujahideen had split from Harkat-ul-Jihad-al-Islami 1985 but re-united, they split again 1998. Jaish-e-Muhammad was formed as a splinter group of Harkat-ul-Mujahideen by Masood Azhar in 2000.) (Note: All of these groups played a role in the kidnapping and beheading murder of American journalist Daniel Pearl to varying degrees. (see #Daniel Pearl kidnapping).)

He was arrested in action during the 1994 kidnappings of Western tourists in India and served time in Indian prisons. He was released in 1999 and was provided safe passage into Afghanistan with the support of the Taliban in exchange for passengers aboard the hijacked Indian Airlines Flight 814. He is best-known for his role in the kidnapping and subsequent murder of Wall Street Journal reporter Daniel Pearl in 2002.

Sheikh was arrested by Pakistani police on 12 February 2002, in Lahore, in connection with Pearl's kidnapping and was sentenced to death on 15 July 2002 by a special judge of an anti-terrorism court for murdering Pearl. His complicity in the murder and the reasons behind it are in dispute. At his initial court appearance, he stated, "I don't want to defend this case. I did this ... Right or wrong, I had my reasons. I think that our country shouldn't be catering to America's needs", but he subsequently appealed his conviction for murder, only admitting his role in the kidnapping of Pearl. Saeed's lawyer has stated he will base his client's appeal on the admission of Khalid Sheikh Mohammed, made public in 2007, that he is the killer of Daniel Pearl. Sheikh's murder conviction was overturned (along with that of his accomplices Fahad Nasim Ahmed, Syed Salman Saqib and Sheikh Mohammad Adil) by Pakistan's Sindh High Court on 2 April 2020, and his seven-year sentence for kidnapping was considered as time served. As of March 2021, he is imprisoned at the Kot Lakhpat Jail, Lahore (where he had been moved to from Central Prison Karachi) but has been moved out of death row while his acquittal for Pearl's murder is in appeal at the Supreme Court of Pakistan.

== Early life ==
Ahmed Omar Sheikh was born in London, England on 23 December 1973 to Pakistani Muslim parents, Saeed and Qaissra Sheikh, who had emigrated from Pakistan to the UK in 1968 and ran a prosperous clothing business. He was the eldest of three siblings and in his youth he attended Forest School, an independent school in Walthamstow, a town in the Waltham Forest borough of North-East London, whose alumni include British cricket captain Nasser Hussain, filmmaker Peter Greenaway and singer Suzana Ansar.

Between the ages of 14 and 16, Sheikh attended Aitchison College, the most exclusive boys boarding school in Pakistan, where his family had temporarily relocated. He later returned to the United Kingdom to continue at Forest School. Reuters journalist Daniel Flynn, who was a childhood friend, says that he was already an admirer of Pakistan's Islamist dictator General Zia-ul-Haq and returned to London as "a junior boxing champion and full of stories of contacts with organised crime, gun battles in the ghettos of Lahore, visits to brothels."

Later, Sheikh attended the London School of Economics to study applied mathematics, statistics, economics and social psychology, but dropped out during his first year. The Guardian reported that a fellow student of Sheikh's at both the Forest School and the LSE, Syed Ali Hasan, had described him in 2002 as "bright but rather dysfunctional" and said that he had been suspended from school on several occasions because of his violent behavior. He was known for his violence since his childhood, having punched and thrown to the floor a teacher when he was eight years old, and grew up to be a bully. Becoming an adult, a "burly-chested six feet two inches" as per journalist Robert Sam Anson, he would eventually translate this violence into a love for martial arts and sports, participating in the 1992 World Armwrestling Championship in Geneva, while also being a chess champion during his days at the LSE. Noted for his academic abilities, he was also a polyglot who could speak five languages. The Guardian reported that Sheikh came into contact with radical Islamists at the LSE, quoting Hasan as saying "[he] told us he was going to Bosnia driving aid convoys, and he never came back to university".

Former Pakistani President Pervez Musharraf, in his book In the Line of Fire, stated that Sheikh was originally recruited by British intelligence agency MI6 while studying at the London School of Economics. He alleges Sheikh was sent to the Balkans by MI6 to engage in operations. Musharraf later says, "At some point, he probably became a rogue or double agent".

Omar Sheikh married Saadia Rauf (who holds an MA degree in English) in Lahore in December 2000 and became a father in November 2001.

In an interview with Massoud Ansari from Newsline dated April 2005, Omar Shaikh stated that "You can obtain details of my background from the book Who Killed Daniel Pearl? by Bernard-Henri Lévy. In this book, Levy traces my entire life story; the references are usually negative but he has done a lot of research."

== Kidnapping of American and British nationals, 1994 ==
He travelled to Bosnia in 1993 during the Bosnian War and met other Pakistani Islamist militants with whom he went to an Afghan training camp and joined the anti-Indian terrorist group Harkat-ul-Ansar. He served five years in prison including the Delhi Tihar Jail in the 1990s in connection with the 1994 kidnappings of Westerners in India perpetrated by the Harkat-ul-Ansar (under the pseudonym of Al-Hadid), during which he had been caught. The abductees included three British citizens, Myles Croston, Paul Rideout, and Rhys Partridge, and one American, Béla Nuss; all of them were rescued unharmed.

During his jail years, where he moved from jail to jail in different cities (e.g. New Delhi, Meerut, etc.), he was noted as wanting to read biographies of Adolf Hitler and Stalin and described "as a tough, militant youth with a sharp, calculating brain well capable of planning and executing terror acts with precision", while his counsel in Meerut, O.P. Sharma, remembers him as a "fanatic to the core" who "believed every non-Muslim is a kafir and must perish", that "there was no concept of democracy in Islam" and even that "at times he turned very violent and behaved like a mentally-challenged person" for instance when "he once beat up one of the deputy jailors at Meerut jail."

== Hijacking and release from prison ==
In 1999, Indian Airlines Flight 814 was hijacked by five Pakistani militants belonging to the Harkat-ul-Mujahideen (formerly Harkat-ul-Ansar) while on the way from Kathmandu, Nepal to New Delhi, India. The hijackers demanded the release of fellow Harkat-ul-Mujahideen members Sheikh and Masood Azhar (who went on to found Jaish-e-Mohammed which Sheikh later joined) and Mushtaq Ahmed Zargar, leader of another Pakistan-based anti-India terror organization. The plane landed in Kandahar and Taliban militia surrounded the plane, pre-empting any Indian commando operation. After negotiations between the Indian government and the hijackers, the hostages were freed eight days after the hijacking occurred, although a passenger, Rupin Katyal, was stabbed to death by one of the hijackers. The three prisoners were released in exchange for the hostages, including Sheikh who was imprisoned at the Tihar Jail in Delhi.

Sheikh also had financial connections with Aftab Ansari, perpetrator of the kidnapping of Partha Pratim Roy Burman and the 2002 attack on American cultural centre in Kolkata.

== Media descriptions ==
The Times has described Sheikh as "no ordinary terrorist but a man who has connections that reach high into Pakistan's military and intelligence elite and into the innermost circles of Osama Bin Laden and the al-Qaeda organisation." According to ABC, Sheikh began working for Pakistan's Inter-Services Intelligence (ISI) in 1993. By 1994, he was operating training camps in Afghanistan and had earned the title of bin Laden's "special son".

In May 2002, The Washington Post quoted an unnamed Pakistani source as saying that the ISI paid Sheikh's legal fees during his 1994 trial in India on charges of kidnapping.

== Possible connection with 9/11 hijackers ==
On 6 October 2001, a senior-level US government official, told CNN that US investigators had discovered Sheikh (Sheik Syed), using the alias "Mustafa Muhammad Ahmad" had sent about $100,000 from the United Arab Emirates to Mohamed Atta. Investigators said "Atta then distributed the funds to conspirators in Florida in the weeks before the deadliest act of terrorism on U.S. soil that destroyed the World Trade Center, heavily damaged the Pentagon and left thousands dead. In addition, sources have said Atta sent thousands of dollars – believed to be excess funds from the operation – back to Syed in the United Arab Emirates in the days before September 11." CNN later confirmed this.

The 9/11 Commission's Final Report states that the source of the funds "remains unknown."

More than a month after the money transfer was discovered, the head of ISI, General Mahmud Ahmed resigned from his position. It was reported that the Federal Bureau of Investigation (FBI) was investigating the possibility that Gen. Ahmed ordered Sheikh to send the $100,000 to Atta.

The Wall Street Journal was one of the only Western news organisations to follow up on the story, citing the Times of India: "US authorities sought General Mahmud Ahmed's removal after confirming that $100,000 was wired to WTC hijacker Mohamed Atta from Pakistan by Ahmad Umar Sheikh at the insistence of General Mahmud." Another Indian newspaper, the Daily Excelsior, quoting FBI sources, reported that the "FBI's examination of the hard disk of the cellphone company Sheikh had subscribed to led to the discovery of the "link" between him and the deposed chief of the Pakistani ISI, Mahmud Ahmed. And as the FBI investigators delved deep, reports surfaced with regard to the transfer of $100,000 to Mohamed Atta, one of the ringleaders of the 11 September attacks, who flew the hijacked American Airlines Flight 11 Boeing 767-223ER commercial airliner into the North Tower of World Trade Center. General Mahmud Ahmed, the FBI investigators found, fully knew about the transfer of money to Atta."

The Pittsburgh Tribune notes that there "are many in Musharraf's government who believe that Saeed Sheikh's power comes not from the ISI, but from his connections with our own CIA."

Sheikh rose to prominence with the 2002 killing of Wall Street Journal reporter Daniel Pearl, who at the time was in Pakistan investigating connections between the ISI and Islamic militant groups. In Pakistan, Sheikh was sentenced to death for killing Pearl, however his complicity in Pearl's execution and the reasons behind it are in dispute. Further adding to the confusion surrounding the issue is that Khalid Sheikh Muhammad personally claimed to have been Pearl's killer.

Saeed was seemingly implicated by Benazir Bhutto just before her own death in a hypothetical murder of Osama bin Laden (which must have occurred in late 2001 or 2002). Several commentators have noted that, as she had previously been speaking about one of the sons of bin Laden during the interview, in all likelihood, Bhutto simply misspoke and had intended to say, "Omar Sheikh, the man who murdered Daniel Pearl," rather than "the man who murdered bin Laden" – such an important revelation about bin Laden's fate would certainly not have been stated so casually. Additionally, in subsequent interviews, Bhutto spoke about bin Laden in the context of him being alive.

== Daniel Pearl kidnapping ==
The kidnapping (on 23 January 2002) and subsequent murder (on 1 February 2002) of American Wall Street Journal reporter Daniel Pearl in Karachi, who was following an investigative lead while working in post-9/11 Pakistan, was committed by several Islamist jihadist groups working in collaboration. (Note: On 23 January 2002, Pearl was on his way to what he thought was an interview with Mubarak Ali Gilani at the Village Restaurant in downtown Karachi about terrorist Richard Reid's alleged training at one of Gilani's camps in Pakistan. The interview was a set-up by Sheikh and Pearl was kidnapped near the Metropole Hotel at 7:00 p.m. The two had come in contact through Khalid Khawaja, a retired Pakistan Air Force officer.) Sheikh, a member of the Harkat ul-Ansar/Harkat-ul-Mujahideen and later Jaish-e-Mohammed, has admitted to planning and committing the kidnapping but denied being involved in Pearl's murder. The beheading video of Pearl was released by Jaish-e-Mohammed, under the pseudonym of "National Movement for the Restoration of Pakistani Sovereignty" and Jaish member Amjad Farooqi was reportedly involved in the kidnapping and murder. In a January 2011 report prepared by the Center for Public Integrity (CPI) and the International Consortium of Investigative Journalists (ICIJ), members of other Pakistani terrorist groups such as Harkat-ul-Jihad al-Islami and Sipah-e-Sahaba Pakistan were also stated to be involved in Pearl's kidnapping and murder. The lead author of the report was Pearl's friend and colleague, journalist Asra Nomani. All of the aforementioned groups were operating under the Lashkar-e-Omar umbrella. Al-Qaeda leaders were also involved in the kidnapping and murder of Pearl, with Saif al-Adel playing a role in organizing the kidnapping and Khalid Sheikh Mohammed was personally identified in investigative reports as the one who killed Pearl. Pearl was detained and later killed at an Al-Qaeda safe house in Karachi owned by Pakistani businessman Saud Memon. Matiur Rehman, another al-Qaeda leader has been identified as being involved in the kidnapping.

Sheikh was arrested by Pakistani police on 12 February 2002, in Lahore, in connection with the kidnapping of Pearl. Pearl after being kidnapped, had his throat slit, and then was beheaded on 1 February 2002. Sheikh told the Pakistani court, however, that he had surrendered to the Inter-Services Intelligence's Ijaz Shah a week earlier on 5 February.

Sheikh's lawyer Abdul Waheed Katpar claims Sheikh was arrested on 5 February 2002 and not on 12 February, and that evidence against the four suspects was fabricated by Pakistani police while the suspects were held in secret for a week. He also claims confessions were obtained under duress of torture and solitary confinement. However, Sheikh also told Pakistani officials in court in February 2002 that "as far as I know" Pearl had been killed.

The CPI and ICIJ report concluded Omar Sheikh was the mastermind of the plot to kidnap Pearl, leading to his subsequent murder. The report also confirmed the role of three codefendants convicted with Sheikh in Pearl's case. Khalid Sheikh Mohammed, a former CIA captive, who had been tortured in 2003 in the CIA's archipelago of black sites, had confessed to the murder, and the report concluded his confession was credible. The report noted that FBI forensic experts had confirmed Khalid Sheikh Mohammed's confession through "vein matching", identifying the pattern of the veins in the killer's hands in the video.

In February 2014, The Times of India reported that Saeed had attempted suicide at the Central Prison Karachi (where he was being held at the time) but had been discovered in time by prison guards and was in a stable condition. The newspaper quoted a senior prison official as saying: "He is kept in a separate cell and section of the jail as he is no ordinary criminal. […] We have filed a case against him for attempted suicide and he can face additional punishment now". A second prison official said: "He is a very intelligent, strong and sharp criminal with dangerous designs. So his attempt to commit suicide comes as a surprise".

== Hoax calls ==
In the aftermath of the 2008 Mumbai attacks; tensions increased dramatically between India and Pakistan. On 28 November, a hoax caller pretending to be then Indian Foreign Minister Pranab Mukherjee threatened Pakistan President Zardari with war, leading to the Pakistan military being put on high alert. Military aircraft with live ammunition were scrambled to patrol above Islamabad and Rawalpindi. The same caller tried to get in touch with the real Pranab Mukherjee and US Secretary of State Condoleezza Rice, claiming he was President Zardari but was unable to get through to either.

A year after the Mumbai attacks, Pakistan's Dawn newspaper revealed that the hoax caller had been Sheikh. Using a mobile phone smuggled into his prison cell, Sheikh made the calls using a British SIM card. After the source of the hoax calls became known, intelligence agents confiscated Sheikh's illegal phones and SIM cards and he was placed in solitary confinement.

== In popular culture ==
The Journalist and the Jihadi: The Murder of Daniel Pearl (2006) a television documentary by Indian directors Ahmed Alauddin Jamal and Ramesh Sharma which aired on HBO compares the contrasting lives of Sheikh and Danel Pearl.

Hollywood film A Mighty Heart (2007) is based on the life of slain journalist Daniel Pearl. Alyy Khan portrayed Sheikh in the film. The film's plot circulates around the memoir by Pearl's wife Mariane Pearl.

In 2008, National Geographic Adventure's docudrama show Locked up Abroad broadcast the episode "India: Hostage to Terror" about Sheikh's 1994 kidnappings of Westerners in India.

In 2017, an Indian biographical film Omerta based on the life of Sheikh was released. Rajkummar Rao portrays Sheikh and the film covers his initial radicalization, role in the 1994 kidnappings of Westerners in India, his release in exchange for hostages of the Indian Airlines flight 814, and his role in the kidnapping and murder of Daniel Pearl.
