= Supreme commander (militant) =

Supreme commander is a title given to a person who controls and runs a militant, insurgent or terrorist organization, especially in South Asia.

The title is often used for the head of a supreme council in many organizations, such as Tehrik-i-Taliban, Jaish-e-Mohammed and Hizbul Mujahideen.

== See also ==
- Mullah Mohammed Omar
- Osama bin Laden
- Taliban
- Tehrik-e-Taliban leadership
- Al-Qaeda
- Sri Lankan Tamil nationalism
- Ahmed al-Sharaa
- Al-Shabaab (militant group)
- Abdul Rauf Asghar
- Ahmad Massoud
