= Omerta (2017 film) =

2017 Indian film by Hansal Mehta

- Theatrical release poster
- Directed by: Hansal Mehta
- Written by: Mukul Dev; Hansal Mehta
- Produced by: Nahid Khan
- Starring: Rajkummar Rao
- Cinematography: Anuj Rakesh Dhawan
- Edited by: Aditya Warrior
- Music by: Ishaan Chhabra
- Production companies: Swiss Entertainment; Karma Features
- Distributed by: NH Studioz
- Release dates: 8 September 2017 (TIFF); 4 May 2018 (India)
- Running time: 105 minutes
- Country: India
- Languages: Hindi; English
- Budget: ₹18 crore
- Box office: est. ₹4.49 crore

Omerta is a 2017 Indian biographical crime drama film directed by Hansal Mehta and stars Rajkumar Rao in the role of Ahmed Omar Saeed Sheikh, British terrorist of Pakistani descent. The film explores the 1994 kidnappings of Westerners in India for which Omar was arrested and served time in prison and the plotting of murder of Wall Street Journal journalist Daniel Pearl in 2002.

The title refers to the Mafia's code of silence but is also a play on the name of the main character. Produced by Nahid Khan of Swiss Entertainment and Shaailesh R Singh of Karma Features, it was screened in the Special Presentations section at the 2017 Toronto International Film Festival, the Mumbai Film Festival, Florence Film Festival, Hong Kong International Film Festival and the Busan International Film Festival. Omerta was the closing night film in 2018 New York Indian Film Festival. Omerta was released on 4 May 2018 and received positive reviews from critics.

== Cast ==
- Rajkummar Rao as Ahmed Omar Saeed Sheikh
- Timothy Ryan Hickernell as Daniel Pearl
- Rajesh Tailang as General Mahmud
- Rupinder Nagra as Maulana Ismail
- Keval Arora as Saeed Sheikh, Omar's father
- Orvana Ghai as Saadia, Omar's wife
- Kallirroi Tziafeta as Mariane Pearl
- Aamir Wani
- Harmeet Singh Sawhney as Abdul
- Sanjeev Mehta as Maulana Masood Azhar
- Satwant Kaur as Qaisra Sheikh- Omar’s mother

== Production ==
The story of Omerta was suggested to director Hansal Mehta by actor Mukul Dev in 2005, who marks his debut as a writer. Mehta said that at the time when Dev told him the story, the internet was "really slow". So he had to buy books, material from the archives and magazines for the research. He started developing the script but made Shahid (2012) with Rajkummar Rao instead, as he felt the latter was an "easier film to make". He credits Rao being a reason Omerta was made. "I had to meet Rajkummar and because I met him, he became an enabler and because of him, I could make this film." Initially, Hansal was thinking of casting Riz Ahmed, a British actor of Pakistani descent, as the lead actor for Omerta.

Mehta stated that his intention behind making Omerta was to explore evil as a "human characteristic". He further said that he wanted to leave the audience with a sense of "awe, disgust, hate, surprise" and to examine the "ramifications of these [terror] events on their lives today." Mehta called the villain of the film, Omar Sheikh, the "hannibal" of terrorism who could be planning how to outwit you even while talking to you."

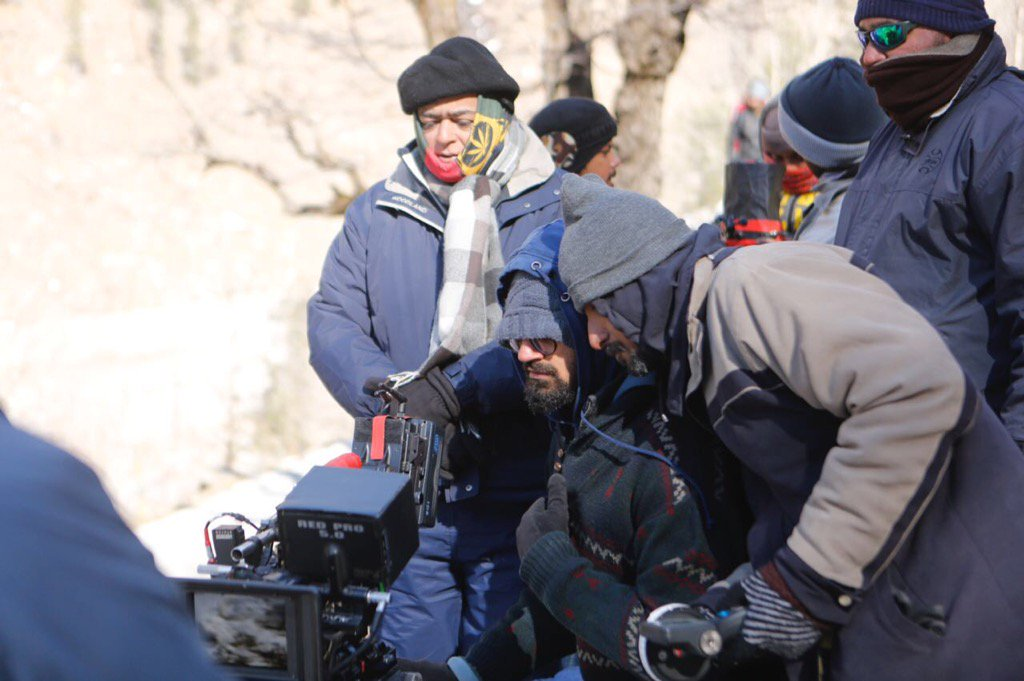
Omerta in the making

Mehta further told that the film "exposes state-sponsored terrorism and how it manipulates young minds into believing a sordid interpretation of Jihad." The film was shot in real locations across London and Punjab, Old Delhi, parts of Kashmir and Himachal Pradesh in India, while the scenes of Afghanistan and Pakistan were recreated. Mehta, along with his crew, visited some of the places that Ahmed Sheikh had visited. Mehta said that the film does not show the backstory of Sheikh and how he became a terrorist: "It is an uncomfortable film which will raise uncomfortable questions and answers that we have to compel our establishment to find". Several real life footage's were purchased from different sources of the Indian Airlines flight 814 hijacking, media footage following the September 11 attacks.

To prepare for the role, Rao watched several videos, documentaries and hate speeches of Sheikh repeatedly to "gather a lot of hatred and anger" inside himself. He expressed that he was "disturbed" while shooting the film, because of the character he was playing and called it "easily the toughest character" he has played till date. While filming, the November 2015 Paris attacks took place. Rao stated that he was in the character and appreciated the attacks, but soon realised that it was wrong. The title of the film refers to the Italian term for a criminal code of honor that encompasses absolute non-cooperation with legal authorities. Anuj Rakesh Dhawan and Aditya Warrior served as the director of photography and editor respectively. Omerta was made on a budget of ₹ 18 crore (including marketing and promotions).

Central Board of Film Certification cleared Omerta with an 'A' certificate, with only two cuts, where the censor board has asked for the national anthem to be removed from an offensive scene and a scene involving full frontal nudity that was showcased to portray the mental condition of the protagonist. There was report that banned scenes were leaked online few days before film’s release.

A special screening of Omerta was held on 29 April 2018, the same day director Hansal Mehta also celebrated his 50th birthday.

== Reception ==
Anna M. M. Vetticad of Firstpost praised the acting of Rajkumar Rao and gave it 3.5 stars. Rajeev Masand of CNN-IBN praised the gripping story line of film and gave it 3 stars. Saibal Chatterjee of NDTV stated Rajkumar Rao performance as pitch- perfect in this riveting thriller and gave it 3.5 stars. Sweta Kaushal of The Hindustan Times praised the spine-chiling acting of Rajkumar rao and gave the film 3.5 stars. Priyanka Bhadani of the Week praised the film editing and gave it 3 stars. Economic Times states that Omerta is a brutal tale of terrorism and gave it 3 stars. Meena Iyer of DNA praised the film as worth watching and gave it 3 stars. Devesh Sharma of Filmfare praised the film as dramatic account of a terrorist life and gave it 3 stars. Deborah Young of The Hollywood Reporter called it a "gripping study of evil that reveals nothing". Dennis Harvey called it a "slickly mounted film" but criticised the lack of motivation behind the crimes. Namrata Joshi of The Hindu did not find the film clinical. Shalini Langer of The Indian Express termed the film as a passion-less biopic and gave it 2.5 stars. Tanul Thakur of the Wire did not find the film too compelling. Nandini Ramnath of Scroll.in described the film as a damp squib.

=== Box office ===
Omerta was released in 500 screens in India. Omerta did not open well at the Indian box office. It grossed ₹ 54 lakhs on the first day. The collections picked up on the first weekend and the film grossed more than ₹ 2 crores on Saturday and Sunday. Omerta grossed ₹ 3.25 crores in the first week. Director Hansal Mehta said that film's poor collections were due to bad show timings after the success of Avengers: Infinity War in India. Omerta was not released in Bahrain, as the Censor Board did not grant permission.

=== Controversy ===
On 26 April 2018, Supreme Court of India passed a judgement, demanding director Hansal Mehta to deposit Omerta's earnings in separate bank account to pay up dues of Adarsh Telemedia — a film production house financed by Amit Agarwal, Kolkata-based businessman.
