= Matiur Rehman =

Pakistani militant (1977–2016)

- Born: 1977; Bahawalpur District, Punjab Province, Pakistan
- Died: 2016 (aged 38–39) (alleged); Afghanistan
- Citizenship: Pakistan
- Organization(s): Al Qaeda's planning director Chief operational commander of Lashkar-e-Jhangvi; Harkat-ul-Jihad al-Islami
- Known for: Pakistan militant

Matiur Rehman Ali Muhammad (1977 – allegedly died in 2016) was a Pakistani militant who had been identified as al-Qaeda's planning director and was the chief operational commander of Lashkar-e-Jhangvi and was closely associated with Harkat-ul-Jihad al-Islami. Pakistani police identified him as being involved in the kidnapping of Wall Street Journal reporter Daniel Pearl. He was designated by the Al-Qaida and Taliban Sanctions Committee of the Security Council in 2011.

He was thought to have frequent contacts with Ayman al-Zawahiri and to be in contact with Rashid Rauf. It was suggested at one point that Rehman and Rauf were one and the same, but this was dismissed by officials in Britain and Pakistan. Rehman was linked by Pakistani officials with the 2006 plot to destroy aircraft using homemade "liquid explosive" devices.

In March 2006 it was reported by ABC News that Pakistani officials said Rehman was behind plans for an attack against the United States and that Pakistan had posted a 10-million rupee (about $166,000) award for his capture. According to ABC News consultant and former French defense ministry adviser Alexis Debat, Rehman was "probably Pakistan's most wanted". Debat described Rehman as "extremely dangerous because of his role as the crucial interface between the brains of al Qaeda and its muscle, which is mainly composed these days of Pakistani militants." Pakistani officials suspected Rehman of being connected to the 2 March 2006 Karachi consulate attacks and said that he had helped train Pakistani militants at al Qaeda training camps in the late 1990s.

In August 2006 ABC News erroneously reported that Matiur Rehman had been captured in Pakistan. ABC consultant Alexis Debat had warned ABC it was not true a day after the report had initially been broadcast, and ABC retracted it when it turned out that Rehman had not in fact been captured.

GlobalSecurity.org's profile of Rehman reports that US counterterrorism sources were unconvinced of his importance.

According to the United Nations Security Council, Rehman was killed in Afghanistan in 2016.
