= Al-Umar-Mujahideen =

Kashmiri militant organisation

- Urdu: العمر مجاہدین
- Founder: Mushtaq Ahmed Zargar
- Leader: Mushtaq Ahmed Zargar
- Dates active: 1989-2006
- Split from: Jammu and Kashmir Liberation Front
- Group: Al-Umar Commando Force
- Ideology: Kashmiri Separatism; Jihadism; Anti-Indian sentiment

Al-Umar-Mujahideen (Urdu: العمر مجاہدین) was an Islamic Jihadist militant organisation operating in the Indian state of Jammu and Kashmir. It was founded in 1989 by a Kashmiri militant, named Mushtaq Ahmed Zargar.

== History ==
Zargar formed the group in 1989 in the area of Jammu and Kashmir to separate the area from Indian control into mainly Pakistani Muslim control through war and "armed struggle" (jihad). The group was a split from the Jammu Kashmir Liberation Front which then gained members from JKLF, Ikhwan-ul-Muslimeen, and Al-Madad.

After inter-conflict within the group, Zargar stole weapons from Al-Umar-Mujahideen and established a new organization named Al-Umar Commando Force.

In 1992, the leader of the group, Zargar, was arrested on multiple murder counts in Srinagar before being released for the passengers in Kandahar, Afghanistan from the hijacked IC 814 flight. Over the years, at least three dozen murder cases were registered against Zargar in Srinagar, including for alleged killings of high-ranking Indian officers. Zargar was arrested on 15 May 1992 and imprisoned. He was released from jail on 31 December 1999 as part of the Indian Airlines Flight 814 hostage deal and provided safe passage to Pakistan. Shortly after Zargar again revived the Al-Umar Mujahideen in Muzaffarabad.

In 2018, the group refused to abide by a proposed cease-fire agreement between them and India, saying that they will continue to be active in the area of Jammu and Kashmir until India completely withdraws from Kashmir.

In March 2023, the Indian government declared the groups' founder Mushtaq Ahmed Zargar an officially designated terrorist and the group Al-Umar-Mujahideen as a terrorist organization.

The operational militancy of the group have seemed to have ended in early 2000s and the last incident involving the group was in 2006, when three of its top commanders were arrested in Kashmir. Since then the group haven't done any attacks or militant activities though they continue its propaganda online.
