= Amjad =

Amjad (Arabic: أمجد), is an Arabic male name meaning “honorable” and “glorious”. It is the superlative of the word majid.

Notable people and characters with the name include:

- Amjad Khan (squash player) (born 1980), Pakistani professional squash player
- Amjad Khan (actor) (1940–1992), Indian actor
- Amjad Khan (American cricketer) (born 1966), American cricketer
- Amjad Khan (cricketer, born 1980) (born 1980), Danish-born English cricketer
- Amjad Ali Khan (born 1945), Indian sarod player
- Amjad Farooqi (1972–2004), Pakistani Islamic militant
- Amjad Hussain (born 1959), British rear-admiral
- Grant Amjad Miller, Palestinian-American politician
- Syed Amjad Ali (1907–1997), Pakistani civil servant
- Mohammed Amjad (cricketer) (born 1971), English cricketer
- Mohammad Amjad, Pakistani politician
- Muhammad Amjad (died 1927), Islamic scholar
- Amjad Iqbal (born 1983), Pakistani footballer
- Amjad Parvez (1945–2024), Pakistani engineer, writer and singer
- Amjad Jaimoukha (1962–2017), Jordanian writer and publicist
- Amjad Islam Amjad (1944–2023), Pakistani poet and screenwriter
- Amjad Sabri (1976–2016), Pakistani qawwali singer
- Amjad Malik, character in the film Citizen Khan
