= Bhalwal, India =

Bhalwal
- census town
- Location in India
- Coordinates: 32°48′34″N 74°46′6″E
- Country: India
- State: Jammu and Kashmir
- District: Jammu

Population (2011)
  - Total: 14,174

Languages
  - Official: Urdu
- Time zone: UTC+5:30 (IST)

Bhalwal is a census town in Jammu district in the Indian union territory of Jammu and Kashmir.
