= Amjad Farooqi =

Pakistani terrorist (1972–2004)

- امجد فاروقی
- Born: c. 1972; Punjab, Pakistan
- Died: September 26, 2004 (aged 31–32); Nawabshah, Sindh, Pakistan
- Military career
- Allegiance: Al-Faran (c. 1990s); Jaish-e-Mohammed (2000–2004)
- Nicknames: Amjad Hussain; Amjad Hussain Farooqi; Mansur Hasnain; Imtiaz Siddiqui; Hyder; Doctor
- Engagements: Insurgency in Jammu and Kashmir; War in North-West Pakistan

Amjad Farooqi (Urdu: امجد فاروقی; c. 1972 – September 26, 2004), alias Amjad Hussain, was a Pakistani militant who operated in Indian-administered Kashmir, Afghanistan and Pakistan.

== Background ==
Farooqi was believed to have been involved in the 1995 kidnapping of Western tourists in Jammu and Kashmir, and under the alias Mansur Hasnain, was suspected to be one of the hijackers of Indian Airlines Flight 814, which was rerouted to Taliban-controlled Afghanistan in 1999.

He was allegedly involved in the murder of American journalist Daniel Pearl in 2002, and, along with Abu Faraj al-Libbi, the assassination attempts on Pakistani President Pervez Musharraf on 14 and 25 December 2003. Farooqi was also suspected of being an associate of al-Qaeda terrorist Khalid Sheikh Mohammed.

Pakistani security forces launched a massive manhunt for Farooqi and other terrorists in May 2004, and eventually cornered him in his safehouse in Nawabshah, Sindh, where he was killed following a two-hour-long gunfight.

Farooqi was a member of Jaish-e-Mohammed, an Islamic terrorist group founded by Pakistani militant Masood Azhar following his release by India as part of prisoner negotiations after the Pakistani militants' hijacking of Indian Airlines Flight 814 in December 1999.
