= All Jammu & Kashmir Patriotic Peoples Front =

Political party in Jammu & Kashmir

All Jammu & Kashmir Patriotic Peoples Front, a state political party in Jammu and Kashmir. The group is a pro-Indian faction, linked to the so-called counter-insurgent or paramilitary forces. Their origins lie in the Muslim Mujahedin group (itself a splinter group from Hizbul Mujahideen). The Muslim Mujahedin group was a former islamist guerrilla group that turned themselves in to the government in 1995 and developed cooperation with the Indian army. During 1997–1998, the forces of the Muslim Mujahedin group were demobilized, and the remaining members reorganized as The Patriotic Peoples Front.

After 1997, the PPF supported Farooq Abdullah's Jammu & Kashmir National Conference government in Kashmir.

In the Lok Sabha elections of 1999, the leader of PPF, Ghulam Nabi Mir, was a candidate in the constituency of Anantnag district. He received 1,500 votes, or 1.46% of the total. Ghulam Nabi Mir was shot to death outside his residence by Hizbul Mujahideen militants on 16 June 2001. He had previously escaped a similar attack in 2000.

The PPF does not currently have any seats in the assembly of Jammu and Kashmir.
