= Rashid Rauf =

British-Pakistani al-Qaeda member

- راشد رؤوف
- Born: ca. 1981; Birmingham, West Midlands, England
- Died: 22 November 2008 (aged 26–27); North Waziristan, Khyber Pakhtunkhwa, Pakistan
- Cause of death: Drone attack
- Citizenship: British; Pakistani
- Organizations: Jaish-e-Mohammed; Al-Qaeda
- Known for: 2006 transatlantic aircraft plot
- Criminal charges: Terrorism
- Escaped: 14 December 2007
- Escape end: 22 November 2008 (death)

Rashid Rauf (Urdu: راشد رؤوف; c. 1981 – 22 November 2008) was an alleged Al-Qaeda operative. He was a dual citizen of Britain and Pakistan who was arrested in Bhawalpur, Pakistan, in connection with the 2006 transatlantic aircraft plot in August 2006, a day before some arrests were made in Britain. Pakistani Interior Minister Aftab Ahmad Khan Sherpao claimed that "he is an al Qaeda operative with linkages in Afghanistan". He was identified as one of the ringleaders of the alleged plot. In December 2006, the anti-terrorism court in Rawalpindi found no evidence that he had been involved in terrorist activities, and his charges were downgraded to forgery and possession of explosives. A 2022 article offers an assessment of the impact of Operation Overt and refers to Rauf's alleged role. Rauf is now believed to have had an important role in planning the 7 July 2005 London bombings.

Rauf was born in England to Pakistani parents, and brought up in Birmingham where his father was a baker. Rauf was married to a relative of Maulana Masood Azhar, who is the head and founder of Jaish-e-Mohammed, an Islamist militant group in Pakistan.

Rauf escaped from custody in December 2007. He was reportedly killed by a US drone attack in Pakistan on 22 November 2008, carried out by the CIA's Special Activities Division. The report was based on communications intercepted from militants in North Waziristan. His family initially denied that he was killed. While CIA and Pakistan intelligence officials maintained that Rauf was killed in the airstrike, the news site Long War Journal believed otherwise.

On 11 August 2009, Asia Times Online claimed that Rauf was alive, living in North Waziristan. On 8 July 2010, however, a US counterterrorism official told the New York Daily News that Rauf was killed. Some of Rauf's associates also believe that he never escaped from prison in 2007 and that he might have been dead long before the airstrike; Hashmat Malik, a lawyer representing the family of Rauf's wife Umat al-Warood, has also argued that Rauf was probably killed during a prison shootout at the time of his alleged escape. British security sources also believed he might still be alive.

On 27 October 2012, Rauf's family officially confirmed that he was killed in a US drone strike. A family friend also told the Sunday Mercury that Rauf's family was filing a wrongful death lawsuit against the British government, claiming that "They want justice for their son who was killed in murky circumstances that amount to cold-blooded murder. Rashid never had a chance to defend or explain himself. He was accused of some heinous crimes and without any trial, judge or jury he was blown to pieces by a unmanned Predator drone aircraft controlled by a soldier sitting thousands of miles away in the US. The Americans could not have found and killed him without help from British intelligence officers who shared information."

== Timeline ==
12 August 2006: US and British sources said Rauf had a key role in the 2006 transatlantic aircraft plot. Rauf, a British citizen, appeared before a Pakistani magistrate, according to Pakistan's Interior Ministry. Rauf is believed to have left the UK after his uncle was killed in 2002. He was not charged over the murder, which has never been solved. In 2011 German authorities detained a 22-year-old Austrian named Maqsood Lodin on his arrival in Berlin, a body search discovered memory devices, with more than 100 al Qaeda documents that included an inside track on some of the terror group's most audacious plots and a road map for future operations. One document was assessed as being written by Rauf, regarding Operation Overt (trans-Atlantic ocean airliner bomb plot in August 2006). See also UK assessment

15 August: Pakistan said it might extradite Rauf to Britain, although no request had been received, according to The Associated Press.

17 August: Pakistani intelligence claimed that the alleged UK aircraft plot was sanctioned by al Qaeda's then-number two, Ayman al Zawahri. They said investigations indicated that Rauf was the planner of the alleged attacks. "We have reason to believe that it was al Qaeda sanctioned and was probably cleared by al Zawahri", said a Pakistani official.

19 August: After two weeks of interrogation and a careful search of his house, too little evidence had been found to justify his extradition.

22 August: In Pakistan, law enforcement authorities continued to interrogate Rauf over his role in the plot. Pakistani Interior Minister Aftab Khan Sherpao said British police were conducting inquiries in Pakistan but were not involved in questioning Rauf.

26 August: Pakistani Interior Minister Aftab Ahmad Sherpao said Rauf had "wider international links" and was in touch with an Afghanistan-based al-Qaida leader. He did not offer any evidence to back up his claim. Pakistan has withheld information about at least seven suspects, whom security officials say were arrested on Rauf's information. Pakistan has no extradition treaty with Britain, but Sherpao said they would consider deporting Rauf to London if a request was made. Rauf, in his mid-20s, is believed to have been interrogated by Pakistan agents near the capital, Islamabad.

13 December: Terrorism charges against Rauf are dropped. The Pakistani court finds there is no evidence that he is involved in terrorism. The British government stated this did not affect their proceedings against the other suspects.

14 December 2007: Rauf allegedly escaped from jail. Authorities say he escaped after freeing himself from handcuffs. The two police officials on duty were arrested by Islamabad police. The police also tightened security at public transport routes and especially in Rauf's native town, Mirpur. A month after this report surfaced, Rauf's lawyer denied he had escaped and said he was probably still in custody.

2008: Rauf had contact with Bryant Neal Vinas and other named al-Qaeda leaders before 19 August 2008 attack on Forward Operating Base Salerno, an American who joined al-Qaeda. Vinas was captured in November 2008, and convicted of participating in and supporting al-Qaeda plots in Afghanistan and the US

22 November 2008: Rauf is reportedly killed in a US missile strike in Pakistan. After the Pakistan government failed to hand over his body, his family disputed the reports and believed he was still alive.

8 April 2009: British security sources claim Rauf was the mastermind behind an alleged terror cell, the members of which were arrested in North West England. It is unclear whether they thought he was still alive at this time.

27 October 2012: Rauf's family confirmed that he was killed in a US drone strike and announced that they planned to file a wrongful death lawsuit against the British government, accusing them of assisting the US in organising the attack.
