= Harkat-ul-Mujahideen =

Islamist militant group

- Flag of Harkat-ul-Mujahideen
- Leaders: Sajjad Afghani; Fazlur Rehman Khalil
- Dates active: 1985–present
- Allegiance: Afghanistan
- Headquarters: Pakistan
- Ideology: Islamism; Deobandi; Jihadism
- Status: Designated as a terrorist group by: Bahrain; Canada; India; United Kingdom; United States
- Part of: United Jihad Council

Harkat-ul-Mujahideen (Urdu: حرکت المجاہدین, lit. 'Mujahideen movement'; abbreviated HUM) is a Pakistan-based Islamist jihadist group operating primarily in Kashmir. The group had links to Osama bin Laden and Mullah Omar.

The group has been designated as a terrorist organisation by Bahrain, the United Nations, the United Kingdom and the United States. In response the organisation changed its name to Harkat-ul-Mujahideen. The group splintered from Harkat-ul-Jihad-al-Islami (HuJI), a Pakistani group formed in 1980 to fight the Soviet military in Afghanistan. The Government of India has declared and banned HuM as a jihad organisation.

== Post Soviet–Afghan War ==
Harkat-ul-Mujahideen was originally formed as a splinter group of Harkat-ul-Jihad al-Islami in 1985. In 1989, at the end of Soviet–Afghan war, the group entered Kashmiri politics by use of militants under the leadership of Sajjad Afghani and Muzaffar Ahmad Baba Alias Mukhtar. In 1993 the group merged with Harkat-ul-Jehad-al-Islami to form Harkat-ul-Ansar.

Immediately following the merger India arrested three senior members: Nasrullah Mansur Langaryal, chief of the former Harkat-ul Mujahideen in November 1993; Maulana Masood Azhar, General Secretary in February 1994, and Sajjad Afghani (Sajjad Sajid) in the same month in Srinagar. Muzaffar Ahmad Baba was killed in an encounter at Pandan Nowhatta with the BSF in January 1994.

As a response the group carried out several kidnappings in an attempt to free their leaders, all of which failed. It was linked to the Kashmiri group al-Faran that kidnapped five Western tourists in Kashmir in July 1995; one, Hans Christian Ostrø, was killed in August 1995 and the other four reportedly were killed in December of the same year.

In 1997, the United States designated Harkat-ul-Ansar as a terrorist organisation, and in response it renamed itself to Harkat-ul-Mujahideen.

In 1999, Sajjad was killed during a jailbreak which led to the hijacking, by the group, of Indian Airlines Flight 814 in December, which led to the release of Maulana Masood Azhar, Ahmed Omar Saeed Sheikh and Mushtaq Ahmed Zargar by the Indian Government. Azhar did not, however, return to the HUM, choosing instead to form the Jaish-e-Mohammed (JEM), a rival militant group expressing a more radical line than the HUM, in early 2000.

== Post 9/11 attacks ==
The group again came to the attention of the US after the 9/11 attacks, leading President George W. Bush to ban the group, this time under its Harkat-ul-Mujahideen moniker, on 25 September 2001.

The long-time leader of the group, Fazlur Rehman Khalil, in mid-February 2000 stepped down as HUM emir, turning the reins over to the popular Kashmiri commander and his second-in-command, Farooq Kashmiri. Khalil assumed the position of HUM Secretary General.

HUM is thought to have several thousand-armed supporters located in Pakistani Kashmir, and India's southern Kashmir and Doda regions. It uses light and heavy machine guns, assault rifles, mortars, explosives, and rockets. HUM lost some of its membership due to defections to the Jaish-e-Mohammed.

The group is based in Muzaffarabad, Rawalpindi, and several other towns in Pakistan and Afghanistan, but members conduct insurgent and terrorist activities primarily in Kashmir.

The group's current leader, Fazlur Rehman Khalil, lives openly in the Islamabad suburb of Golra Sharif. He has denied having any contact with Osama bin Laden.

According to The New York Times, Osama Bin Laden's seized cellphones attest Harkat-ul-Mujahideen's continued contact with Osama Bin Laden and its bases and fighters shared with the Taliban over the years following the war in Afghanistan.

Since, the formation of Jaish-e-Mohammed, the group suffered both in leadership and cadre strength with most of funding and weapons diverted to the new outfit.

== Designation as terrorist organisation ==
The countries and organisations below have officially listed the Harkat-ul-Mujahideen (HuM) as a terrorist organisation.

Country	Date	References
Bahrain		
Canada	27 November 2002	
India		
United Kingdom	14 October 2005	
United States	25 September 2001	

== Harkat ul-Ansar ==
Harkat ul-Ansar (HuA) was an Islamic terrorist organisation founded by Abdelkader Mokhtari in 1993. It was the result of a merger between Harkat-ul-Mujahideen and Harkat-ul-Jihad-al-Islami (HuJI). Many of its operations were conducted in Jammu and Kashmir.

Soon after its founding, several members of its leadership were arrested by Indian Security Forces. In November 1993, the former head of HuM, Nasrullah Mansur Langrayal, was arrested. In February 1994, the HuA general secretary, Maulana Masood Azhar and chief commander, Sajjad Afghani, were captured in the Chattargul area of Anantnag district.

It was labeled a terrorist organisation in 1997 by the United States because of its connections with Saudi terrorist Osama bin Laden. The ban severely limited the funding of the group, and as a result HuA was reorganised as a reincarnated Harkat-ul-Mujahideen. At the time, Azhar split from the group to form Jaish-e-Mohammed. In 1998, U.S.'s Central Intelligence Agency (CIA) in its report stated, "HuA, an Islamic terrorist organisation that Pakistan supports in its proxy war against Indian forces in Kashmir, increasingly is using terrorist tactics against Westerners and random attacks on civilians that could involve Westerners to promote its pan-Islamic agenda." CIA also stated that Hua had abducted at least 13 persons, of which 12 were from western countries in the period from early 1994 to 1998.

== See also ==
- List of Deobandi organisations
- 1995 kidnapping of Western tourists in Kashmir
- Ansar Al-Mujahideen
- Harkat-ul-Jihad-al-Islami
- Jaish-e-Mohammed
- Hizbul Mujahideen
