= Mushtaq Ahmed Zargar =

Kashmiri militant (born 1967)

- Born: 1967 (age 58–59); Srinagar, J&K, India
- Organization(s): Al-Umar Mujahideen; Al-Umar Commando Force; Jaish-e-Mohammed; Harkat-ul-Ansar
- Known for: kashmiri separatism, Jihadism and founding of Al-Umar Mujahideen militant group. kidnapping of Rubaiya Sayeed; Released from jail as part of the Indian Airlines flight 814 hijacking hostage deal.
- Political party: Hurriyat Conference
- Other political affiliations: Ikhwan-ul-Muslimeen; Jammu and Kashmir Liberation Front (until 1990)
- Criminal charges: Mass murder, Target killing and Kidnapping
- Criminal penalty: Life imprisonment (for mass murder); Death (for target killing and kidnapping), overturned
- Criminal status: Wanted by the National Investigation Agency, currently free in Pakistan

Mushtaq Ahmed Zargar (born 1967, also known as Mushtaq Latram) is a Kashmiri separatist leader and militant active in the Kashmir insurgency, and founder of the militant outfit Al-Umar Mujahideen. He spent considerable time in an Indian prison and was released in the aftermath of the Indian Airlines flight 814 hijacking. He currently lives in Pakistan.

== Early life and career ==
Zargar grew up in the Nowhatta area of Srinagar in the Kashmir Valley. He joined the Jammu Kashmir Liberation Front in 1988, encouraged by its founder Ashfaq Majeed Wani, and allegedly left for combat training in Azad Kashmir. He returned to Jammu and Kashmir in 1989.

On 8 December 1989 Zargar was one of the members who carried out kidnapping of Rubaiya Sayeed, the daughter of the newly appointed Home Minister of India Mufti Mohammad Sayeed. The kidnappers demanded the release of five of their comrades in exchange for Rubaiya Sayeed's release. The government accepted their demands.

After Wani's death in March 1990, he fell out with Hamid Sheikh and Yasin Malik, Wani's successors, and in 1991 formed his own militant group which he called Al-Umar Mujahideen.

Over the years, at least three dozen murder cases were registered against Zargar in Srinagar, including for alleged killings of high-ranking Indian officers. Zargar was arrested on 15 May 1992 and imprisoned. He was released from jail on 31 December 1999 as part of the Indian Airlines Flight 814 hostage deal and provided safe passage to Pakistan. Shortly after Zargar revived Al-Umar Mujahideen in Muzaffarabad.

Zargar was reportedly arrested by Pakistani authorities in 2002 but as of 2007, he was living in Muzaffarabad without any restrictions.

In March 2023, the Indian government declared Zargar an officially designated terrorist and the group Al-Umar-Mujahideen as a terrorist organization.
