= Jaish-e-Mohammed =

Deobandi-jihadist Pakistani militant organization

- جيشِ محمدؐ
- The flag of Jaish-e-Mohammed
- Leader: Masood Azhar
- Supreme Commander: Abdul Rauf Azhar
- Dates active: 2000–present
- Allegiance: Pakistan
- Groups: Al-Akhtar Trust; Lashkar-e-Mustafa
- Headquarters: Bahawalpur, Pakistan
- Active regions: Jammu and Kashmir
- Ideology: Deobandi jihadism Sunni Islamism; Islamic fundamentalism
- Status: Active
- Size: Unknown
- Part of: United Jihad Council Operation Tupac
- Wars: Insurgency in Jammu and Kashmir

Jaish-e-Mohammed (JeM) is a Deobandi-jihadist Pakistani militant group active in Kashmir. The group's primary motive is to separate Jammu and Kashmir from India and integrate it into Pakistan.

Since its inception in 2000, the group has carried out several terrorist attacks on civilian, economic, and military targets in India. It portrays Kashmir as a "gateway" to the entire India, whose Muslims it deems to be in need of liberation. It maintains close relations and alliances with the Taliban, al-Qaeda, Lashkar-e-Taiba, Hizbul Mujahideen, Harkat-ul-Mujahideen, Ansar Ghazwat-ul-Hind, Indian Mujahideen.

JeM was allegedly created with the support of Pakistan's Inter-Services Intelligence (ISI), which is using it to carry out terrorist attacks in Kashmir and rest of India. Due to sustained international pressure against Pakistan sponsored terrorism, JeM was banned in Pakistan in 2002 as a formality. However, the organization was never seriously disrupted or dismantled. Its arrested leaders were subsequently released without any charges and permitted to re-form under new names. Its variants openly continue operations under different names or charities in several facilities in Pakistan.

According to B. Raman, Jaish-e-Mohammed is viewed as the "deadliest" and "the principal Islamic terrorist organisation in Jammu and Kashmir". The group was responsible for several attacks: the 2001 attack on Jammu and Kashmir legislative assembly, the 2001 Indian Parliament attack, the 2016 Pathankot airbase attack, the 2016 attack on the Indian Mission in Mazar-i-Sharif, the 2016 Uri attack, and the 2019 Pulwama attack, each of which has had strategic consequences for India–Pakistan relations. The group has been designated as a terrorist organisation by Pakistan, Russia, Australia, Canada, India, New Zealand, the United Arab Emirates, the European Union, the United Kingdom, the United States, and the United Nations.

== Origins ==
Pakistan's Inter-Services Intelligence (ISI) is said to have created Jaish-e-Mohammed by working with several Deobandi Islamic jihadis associated with Harkat-ul-Mujahideen. By the late 1990s, states Ahmed Rashid, the Pakistani military justified jihad in Kashmir as a legitimate part of its foreign policy. Harkat had been set up in mid-1990s with ISI support to carry out "spectacular acts of terrorism". The United States declared it an Islamic jihadist group in 1998 and bombed its training camps in Afghanistan.

In December 1999, Harkat Islamic jihadis hijacked the Indian Airlines Flight 814 scheduled to fly from Kathmandu to Delhi, and diverted it to Kandahar, where they were looked after by the Afghan Taliban and the Pakistani officials stationed at the airport. After they slit the throat of a passenger, the Indian government agreed to their demands and released Maulana Masood Azhar, Ahmed Omar Saeed Sheikh and Mushtaq Ahmed Zargar, three Harkat operatives previously imprisoned in India. The released prisoners were escorted to Pakistan by the ISI, and Masood Azhar was chosen to head the new group Jaish-e-Mohammed. The ISI is said to have paraded him on a victory tour through Pakistan to raise money for the new organisation. Some analysts argue that ISI built up the JeM to counter the growing power of Lashkar-e-Taiba (LeT). Many analysts believed that around 1999, Pakistan's Inter-Services Intelligence (ISI) used JeM to fight in Kashmir and other places, and continues to provide it backing. Although the JeM has been officially banned in Pakistan since 2002, it continues to openly operate several facilities in the country.

Azhar's leadership is said to be nominal. The group has a largely decentralised structure. JeM's membership, drawn from the former members of Harkat-ul-Mujahideen, was allied to the Taliban in Afghanistan and Al Qaeda. The members had shared the Al Qaeda training camps in Afghanistan and carried loyalty to Al Qaeda. A majority of the members of Harkat are said to have followed Azhar into the newly founded group, leaving Harkat under-funded and under-supported.

== History ==
=== 2000–2001 ===
On 20 April 2000, JeM carried out the first suicide bombing in Kashmir, exploding a bomb in an Indian army barracks. Five Indian soldiers were killed.

Following the September 11 attacks in the United States, the Musharraf government joined the United States in the war on terror, assuming that the move would give it a free hand in supporting militancy in Kashmir. In October 2001, JeM carried out a bombing near the Jammu and Kashmir legislative assembly, killing 38 people and claiming responsibility for it. In December 2001, JeM and LeT militants launched a fidayeen attack on the Indian Parliament waging a battle with the security personnel. Eight security personnel and a gardener were killed, but the attack was foiled. JeM claimed responsibility for the attack, but removed the announcement a day later under pressure from the ISI. The Indian Government accused the LeT and JeM of being involved in the attack. Subsequently, four JeM members were caught by Indian authorities and put on trial. All four were found guilty of playing various roles in the incident. One of the accused, Afzal Guru, was sentenced to death.

Security specialist Bruce Riedel comments that even by the standards of modern terrorism, this was an extraordinary attack. If the Prime Minister or a senior party leader of India was killed in the attack, India would have been forced to retaliate militarily. In the event, India called the terror attack an "attack on democracy" and began large-scale troop mobilisation at the India-Pakistan border, launching the largest war games in fifteen years. Pakistan retaliated by launching its own war games, moving troops from the Afghan border to the Indian border. The United States, annoyed with the dilution of the war on terror as well as the threat of an Indo-Pakistani war, delivered an ultimatum to Musharraf, asking him to make "a clear statement to the world that he intends to crack down on terror". Pushed to a corner, Musharraf announced on 12 January 2002 that no organisation would be allowed to indulge in terrorism in the name of Kashmir. He declared a ban on five extremist groups including the JeM. Hundreds of militants were rounded up, states Ahmed Rashid, giving rise to severe hostility and derision from them. However, by March 2002, all the arrested militants were freed and curbs on them were quietly lifted. Financial and intelligence inputs to JeM were resumed. Masood Azhar was released under a court order.

=== Bans, revolts and split ===
Earlier in 2001, when the group anticipated that the US State Department would declare it a foreign Islamic jihadist organisation, it renamed itself Tehrik-ul-Furqan and transferred its assets to low-profile supporters. JeM was declared a foreign Islamic jihadist organisation by the United Nations in October 2001 and by the US in December 2001.

In response to the January 2002 ban by Pakistan, JeM changed its name to Khuddam ul-Islam. Khuddam was also banned in 2003, after which it re-branded itself as a charity called Al-Rehmat Trust through which they are accused of raising funds for their activities.

By this time, the JeM had split into two groups, due to conflicts among the members. Three JeM commanders, Abdul Jabbar, Maulana Umar Farooq and Abdullah Shah Mazhar, left the group and formed Jamaat ul-Furqan. The remaining group that stayed with Masood Azhar used the name Khuddam ul-Islam.

The rank and file of the JeM were angered by Musharraf's U-turn in joining the war on terror. By staying loyal to the Pakistani state, Masood Azhar lost majority support in the JeM Supreme Council, who demanded his resignation. Particularly influential among the rebels was Maulana Abdul Jabbar, whose faction led a jihad against what they called the "slave" government of Pakistan and the US influence upon it. They were supported by Al Qaeda, and joined by members of Lashkar-e-Taiba, Lashkar-e-Jhangvi and Harkatul Mujahideen.

From March to September 2002, the rebels carried out suicide missions on Pakistani officials in cities like Islamabad, Karachi, Murree, Taxila and Bahawalpur. After the fall of the Taliban government, the JeM activists returning from Afghanistan attacked Christian churches, Shia mosques and diplomatic missions inside Pakistan. The ISI demanded Masood Azhar to rein in the rank-and-file. However he had lost control over them. He maintained that they were already expelled from the organisation and the state should arrest them. In fact, most of the factions remained within the JeM and competed with the parent organisation for authority and resources. Some rebellious factions gathered around Abdul Jabbar who launched Jamaat-ul-Furqan in late 2002. The rebel factions were supported by "rogue" members of the ISI. In November 2003, the Musharraf government banned the renamed Khuddam ul-Islam as well as Jamaat-ul-Furqan. Then the rebels carried out two assassination attempts on President Musharraf himself, on 14 December and 25 December 2003. There was evidence of Pakistan military members providing logistical support for the attempts. The explosives used in the bombings were traced to an Al Qaeda camp in South Waziristan. Masood Azhar too had publicly called for the assassination of Musharraf.

Eventually, the government cracked down on the rogue elements in the military and intelligence establishments. More than a hundred members were apprehended and dismissed, with some members being sentenced to death. However, the majority of the militant infrastructure was left intact. Azhar's group, which had fallen into relative obscurity by 2004, was allowed to rebuild itself after the problematic portions of the leadership were purged. The rebellious factions eventually realigned themselves with Tehrik-i-Taliban Pakistan (Pakistani Taliban) in 2007.

=== Revival ===
Masood Azhar stayed loyal to the Pakistani state after 2004. Pakistan in turn protected his group despite the official bans. The group continued to grow in Bahawalpur. In 2009, it was reported to have built a large 6.5 acre walled complex in Bahawalpur, along with a swimming pool and a stable for a dozen horses, which could be used for training militants. India Today later revealed that the complex has been branded as 'Jamia Masjid Subhan Allah' and that it was 8 km. away from the headquarters of Pakistan Army's XXXI Corps. In the centre of the city, the group ran an "imposing" madrassa, attended by hundreds of children every year. In 2008, the organization held a massive three-day rally in the city, with its own armed security guards posted at all the entrances to the city centre. The police were conspicuous by their absence.

Masood Azhar kept a low profile for several years until he resurfaced in 2014, giving fiery speeches calling for more attacks on India and the United States. He boasted of having 300 suicide attackers at his command and threatened to kill Narendra Modi if he were to become the Prime Minister.

Bruce Riedel connects the revival of JeM to the return to office of Prime Minister Nawaz Sharif, who had long advocated a 'détente' with India. The developing links between him and the Indian Prime Minister Narendra Modi, especially following the latter's visit to Lahore on the Christmas Day in 2015, angered the group.

=== 2016 ===
A week after Narendra Modi's visit to Pakistan, the group launched an attack on the Pathankot air base in which seven security personnel were killed. This was immediately followed by an attack on the Indian consulate in Mazar-i-Sharif in Afghanistan. Both India and Pakistan condemned the attack and stayed on course with their peace process. Pakistan has also followed on the leads provided by India and carried out raids on the offices of JeM. It announced the formation of a joint investigation team with India to investigate the attack. It was also announced that Masood Azhar was taken into "protective custody". However, JeM issued a statement denying that anybody had been arrested.

In April 2016, the JeM chief Masood Azhar was said to be free but "within reach, if needed". According to Riaz Hussain Pirzada, the Member of National Assembly from Bahawalpur, the "breeding grounds" still remained and the madrassas were still being financed. According to an official, Nawaz Sharif ordered the Counterterrorism Department to crack down on the organisation but, in a high-level meeting, the army chief General Raheel Sharif pressured the Prime Minister to hand over the crackdown to the Army, after which "no one knows what happened". Dawn reported the Punjab Chief Minister Shahbaz Sharif as saying that, whenever civilian authorities took action against certain groups, the security establishment worked behind the scenes to set them free. The government however denied the accuracy of the report.

Following the onset of the 2016 Kashmir unrest in Indian Jammu and Kashmir, all the jihadi groups in Pakistan held rallies in major cities like Lahore. The JeM was seen openly raising funds for jihad. In September 2016, jihadi militants attacked the Indian brigade headquarters in Uri, close to the Line of Control in Jammu and Kashmir. The attack resulted in the death of 19 soldiers, described as the deadliest attack in over two decades. India suspected JeM for the attack. It also made its feelings felt with heavy rhetoric, the Indian Home Minister calling Pakistan a "terrorist state" and noting that the perpetrators were "highly trained, heavily armed, and specially equipped". Pakistan denied involvement. Subsequently in November 2016, the Nagrota Army base attack was orchestrated. All hostages were unharmed but multiple casualties were reported from the Indian Army while trying to defuse the situation.

India then launched a diplomatic offensive, trying to isolate Pakistan in the world community. On 28 September, it declared that it had carried out "surgical strikes" on alleged JeM camps in Pakistani-administered Kashmir. The claim was however denied by Pakistan.

=== 2019 ===
On 14 February 2019, Jaish-e-Mohammed carried out and claimed responsibility for a suicide attack in Lathpora near Awantipora in Kashmir's Pulwama District on a convoy of security forces, killing least 40 Indian personnel. A bus carrying 39 Central Reserve Police Force personnel was rammed by a car carrying 350 kg of explosives.

On 26 February 2019, 12 Indian Air Force Mirage 2000 jets crossed the Line of Control, and dropped precision-guided bombs on an alleged Jaish-e-Mohammed training camp in Balakot, a town in the Khyber province of Pakistan. The Pakistani government denied that any damage had been caused by the bombs.

On 27 August 2019, two members of a nomadic community were killed by militants believed to be members of Jaish-e-Mohammed in the higher reaches of Tral in south Kashmir after they were abducted from their temporary shelter.

=== 2021 ===
After the Taliban seizure of Afghanistan, many JeM cadres were released, the JeM and Taliban have held meetings and the JeM has been assured of all support in carrying out its activities in India. The Hindustan Times reported on Oct 27, 2021 that JeM's leader Masood Azhar met w/ Taliban leaders including Mullah Baradar in Khandar in late August 2021 seeking their help in the Kashmir fight.

=== 2025 ===
On 7 May 2025, India said that it launched missile strikes on JeM base camps in Bahawalpur, Pakistan in retaliation for the Pahalgam attack. Masood Azhar later claimed that several of his family members were killed in the strikes. According to Indian officials, his brother, Abdul Rauf Azhar who took the command of JeM on 21 April 2007, was killed in the strikes. Though this remains unconfirmed, other reports which list wanted terrorist claimed to have been killed in the strikes do not include his name. Masood Azhar, who confirmed the death of 10 members of his family in a statement, also did not list his name among those killed in the strikes.

In September 2025, rare admissions from top JeM commanders confirmed the destruction of their training camps in Bahawalpur. At the 38th annual Mission Mustafa conference, Jaish-e-Muhammad commander Masood Ilyas Kashmiri revealed that Indian forces "tore into pieces" the family members of Masood Azhar during the strike in Bahawalpur, and accused Pakistan Army Chief Asim Munir of sending generals to the funerals of slain terrorists.

After 12 May, India subsequently conducted more operations in Jammu and Kashmir. On 15 May, Asif Ahmed Sheikh, Amir Nazir Wani, and Yawar Ahmad Bhat — all residents of Pulwama district who were identified as JeM associates — were killed in an encounter with Indian security forces in Tral's Nadir village. They were reportedly shot dead after opening fire on troops during a cordon and search operation based on specific intelligence about their presence.

In July 2025, Sunil Bahadur Thapa, Advisor to the President of Nepal and former Minister of Industry, warned that groups like Jaish-e-Mohammed could potentially exploit Nepal as a transit point for its activities in India, raising concerns about regional security.

== Ideology and goals ==
The declared objective of the JeM is to liberate Kashmir and merge it with Pakistan. However, it projects Kashmir as a "gateway" to all of India, whose Muslims are deemed to be in need of liberation. After liberating Kashmir, it aims to carry out its activities in other parts of India, with an intent to drive Hindus and other non-Muslims from the Indian subcontinent.

JeM also aims to drive the United States and Western forces from Afghanistan. The JeM leader Masood Azhar is reported to have said in a speech in Karachi:

Marry for jihad, give birth for jihad and earn money only for jihad till the cruelty of America and India ends.

In late 2002, Christians were targeted across Pakistan and the gunmen belonging to JeM were caught for the acts. Some members have attacked members of the Pakistani state and western targets inside Pakistan. Jewish American journalist Daniel Pearl was abducted and murdered by Ahmed Omar Sheikh.

== Organization ==
=== Leadership ===
JeM's founder and leader (emir) is Maulana Masood Azhar, who had earlier been a leader of Harkat-ul-Mujahideen. Having trained at the same religious seminary (Jamia Uloom-ul-Islamia in Karachi) as the Taliban founder Mullah Omar, he had long-standing connections to Taliban and Al Qaeda. He had fought in Afghanistan and set up Harkat affiliates in Chechnya, Central Asia and Somalia. He was reputed to have taught the Somalis how to shoot down American Black Hawk helicopters. He was regarded as a close associate of Osama bin Laden, when he was sent to Britain for fund raising in the early 1990s. In 1994, Azhar went to Indian-administered Kashmir on a "mission" and got arrested by Indian security forces. Reportedly, Osama bin Laden wanted Azhar freed and ordered Al Qaeda to arrange the hijacking that led to his release. Subsequently, Azhar was lionized in Pakistan and promoted by the ISI as the leader of the new group Jaish-e-Mohammed. Azhar was specially designated as a "global Islamic terrorist" by the United States Treasury Department in 2010.

JeM is run by Azhar's family like a family enterprise. Masood Azhar's brother, Abdul Rauf Asghar, is a senior leader of JeM and its intelligence coordinator. He was one of the hijackers of the flight IC 814 and served as the "acting leader" of JeM in Masood Azhar's absence in 2007. Since 2008, he has been involved with organising suicide attacks in India, including the 2016 Pathankot attack, where he was found to have directed the militants via telephone. Abdul Rauf Asghar has also been designated as a "global terrorists" by the United States Treasury Department. In 2023, one of its commanders, Shahid Latif, was mysteriously assassinated in a mosque in Daska, Sialkot

=== Membership ===
The launch of JeM in Karachi in 2000 was attended by 10,000 armed followers. The majority of the early membership was drawn from Harkat-ul-Mujahideen. Having fought in Afghanistan alongside the Taliban and Al Qaeda, these members carried loyalty to those organisations and enmity towards the United States.

Approximately three-quarters of JeM's membership is drawn from Punjab in Pakistan, from Multan, Bahawalpur and Rahim Yar Khan districts. This region being the main ethnic origin of the Pakistani military corps, ISI believed that the shared ethnicity would make the JeM aligned to the military's strategic goals. There are also a large number of Afghans and Arabs. Several western militants of Pakistani origin have also joined the organisation. Prominent among them are Rashid Rauf, who was involved with a 2006 plot to blow up transatlantic airliners, Shehzad Tanweer, who was involved with the 2005 London Underground bombings, and Ahmed Omar Sheikh, convicted of murdering Daniel Pearl.

Following the split in 2002, the majority of the original fighters left the parent organisation and joined renegade groups. When the organisation was revived by 2009, JeM was believed to have between one and two thousand fighters and several thousand supporting personnel. Masood Azhar claimed to have 300 suicide attackers at his command.

=== Infrastructure ===
JeM originally operated training camps in Afghanistan, jointly with the other militant groups. After the fall of the Taliban government, it relocated them to Balakot and Peshawar in Khyber-Pakhtunkhwa and Muzaffarabad in Pakistan-administered Kashmir. By 2009, it developed a new headquarters in Bahawalpur in Pakistani Punjab, 420 miles south of Islamabad. These include a madrassa in the centre of the city and a 6.5 acre walled complex that serves as a training facility, including water training and horse back riding. Bahawalpur also serves as a rest and recuperation facility for jihadists fighting in Afghanistan, away from the areas of US drone attacks. It is also close to the bases of other militant groups with which JeM is believed to have operational ties: Lashkar-e-Taiba in Muridke, Sipah-e-Sahaba in Gojra, and Lashkar-e-Jhangvi also based in Punjab. There are at least 500–1000 other madrassas in Bahawalpur, most of which teach a violent version of Islam to children.

==== Redevelopment efforts after Indian airstrikes ====
Following the destruction of JeM's key facilities—including its headquarters, Markaz Subhanallah, and four additional training camps namely Markaz Bilal, Markaz Abbas, Mahmona Zoya, and Sargal—in Indian strikes conducted under Operation Sindoor on 7 May 2025, the group initiated a large-scale reconstruction effort. Indian Intelligence reports indicated that JeM launched a PKR 3.91 billion fundraising campaign aimed at rebuilding these centers and establishing new '313' Markaz centers. Each new markaz was projected to cost PKR 12.5 million, with funding primarily being solicited via digital wallets. Reports also suggested that the Pakistani government had announced plans to redevelop the destroyed centers, and that appeals for donations were being circulated through social media platforms linked to JeM. India blames Pakistan for deliberately avoiding monitoring of the digital wallets.

==== Jamat ul-Muminat ====
JeM's first women's brigade, Jamat ul-Muminat was announced in October 2025 by JeM's propaganda outlet Al-Qalam Media. A letter signed by JeM chief Masood Azhar disclosed the course of action. According to reports, the new unit's recruitment process started on October 8 in Markaz Usman-o-Ali in Bahawalpur, Pakistan. Sadiya Azhar, the sister of Masood Azhar, will lead the women's wing. It was disclosed that the group has begun recruiting economically disadvantaged women who are enrolled in its facilities in Bahawalpur, Karachi, Muzaffarabad, Kotli, Haripur, and Mansehra, as well as the wives of JeM commanders. This new female brigade was created as a result of Masood Azhar and his brother Talha al-Saif's joint approval of the decision to include women in JeM's operational framework after the Pahalgam attack and Operation Sindoor. Its purpose is to prepare and employ female suicide bombers for terrorist acts. In an attempt to increase recruitment and generate money for its women's wing, JeM has introduced an online course called Tufat al-Muminat. Through theological and jihad-focused instruction, the online course seeks to attract and brainwash women into joining JeM's female wing. Masood Azhar's sisters, Sadiya, Safia, Samaira, and Afreera Farooq, wife of Pulwama attack conspirator Umar Farooq will conduct the 40-minute daily sessions via online platforms starting on November 8. A donation of ₹500 (in Pakistani rupee) is requested from each participant. In the sessions, they will learn about their responsibilities from the standpoint of Islam and jihad from female family members of JeM leaders. The goal is to create a women's force that is modeled after the Liberation Tigers of Tamil Eelam, Hamas, and the Islamic State.

Indian security officials detained Dr. Shaheen Shahid in Faridabad following the 2025 Delhi car explosion. Shahid was tasked with the establishment and leadership of Jamat ul-Muminat in India. According to investigative agencies, Shaheen Shahid, who communicated with handlers in Pakistan via social media, may have been given the direct assignment by Sadia Azhar to increase the JeM's recruitment base by rallying supporters of the group's actions in India. At Al-Falah University, the Haryana Police Bomb Disposal Squad found a silver Suzuki Brezza on 13 November 2025 that belonged to Dr. Shaheen Shahid. The vehicle was one of many that were meant to be used in the terror bombing.

=== Funding ===
As of 2025, Jaish-e-Mohammed (JeM), according to claims made by Indian sources, reportedly adopted digital financial technologies to facilitate its funding operations, effectively creating a parallel financial ecosystem. According to investigative reports, JeM utilizes Pakistani fintech platforms such as EasyPaisa and SadaPay to collect and move funds domestically and internationally. These digital wallets enable the group to bypass traditional banking scrutiny, especially following the increased financial monitoring imposed during Pakistan's engagement with the Financial Action Task Force (FATF). JeM is believed to operate over 2,000 active digital wallet accounts, collectively moving an estimated PKR 800–900 million (approximately USD 2.8–3.2 million) annually. The group employs a rotation model whereby funds are cycled through multiple wallets and dispersed into smaller transactions, making tracing and enforcement challenging. These wallets are reportedly linked to senior JeM figures and are used to solicit donations for purported reconstruction efforts, while a substantial portion of the funds is allegedly diverted to procure arms and support operational infrastructure. Indian Intelligence report reportedly linked the fundraising activities of Jaish-e-Mohammed (JeM) to several digital wallet accounts. These included a SadaPay account registered under the name Talha Al Saif (also known as Talha Gulzar), associated with a phone number reportedly used by Haripur district commander Aftab Ahmed. Additional accounts included an EasyPaisa wallet operated by Abdullah Azhar, son of JeM founder Masood Azhar, and another belonging to Syed Safdar Shah, a JeM commander in Khyber Pakhtunkhwa. Reports suggested the group maintains over 250 active EasyPaisa wallets and creates approximately 30 new accounts monthly, potentially to obscure the origins of its funding.

=== Publications ===
Like other jihadi outfits in the country, JeM distills its ideology through the print media, its publications including the weekly Al-Qalam in Urdu and English, monthly Ayeshatul Binat in Urdu for women and weekly Musalman Bachy for children. Other E-publications are made on telegram channels usually stating their successes in their operations against the Indian Army and publishing statements of the leadership of the organization

=== Links to other organisations ===
When JeM started, it had strong ties to the Taliban and Al-Qaeda, sharing their training camps in Afghanistan, and exchanging intelligence, training and coordination. Bruce Riedel suggests that the 2001 Indian Parliament attack was possibly a "payback" to Al-Qaeda for its earlier help in getting Masood Azhar released. With the Indian reaction to the attack, Pakistan was forced to move its forces from the Afghan border to the Indian border, relieving pressure on Al-Qaeda.

Most of the JeM members with loyalties to the Taliban left to join renegade groups in 2002. However, Masood Azhar's group was noticed recruiting fighters for the Afghan jihad in 2008. In 2010, Pakistan's Interior minister Rehman Malik stated that the JeM, along with Lashkar-e-Jhangvi and Sipah-e-Sahaba Pakistan, were allied to the Taliban and Al-Qaeda. Within South Punjab, the JeM is closely allied to Lashkar-e-Jhangvi and Sipah-e-Sahaba. Scholars Abou Zahab and Roy state that the three organisations appear to be "the same party" focusing on different sectors of activity.

In October 2000, Masood Azhar, founder of the banned Jaish-e-Mohammed, was quoted as saying that "Sipah-e-Sahaba stands shoulder to shoulder with Jaish-e-Muhammad in Jihad." A leaked U.S. diplomatic cable described Jaish-e-Mohammed as "another Sipah-e-Sahaba breakaway Deobandi organisation."

JeM continues to have links to its ancestor, Harkat-ul-Mujahideen. In addition, the group has operational ties to Lashkar-e-Taiba, which it employed in launching the 2001 attack on the Indian Parliament in New Delhi. It joined the ISI-sponsored United Jihad Council, an umbrella organisation of 13–16 militant organisations that fight in Indian-administered Kashmir.

Khuddam ul-Islam is a militant splinter group of the Jaish-e-Mohammed. It is a Proscribed Organisation in the United Kingdom under the Terrorism Act 2000 and said to be politically aligned with Maulana Fazal-ur-Rehman's faction of Jamiat Ulema-e-Islam. Some sources believe that Khuddam ul-Islam is simply a restructuring of JeM and that the group is under the command of Mufti Abdul Rauf Asghar, the younger brother of JeM's founder, Maulana Masood Azhar.

== Al-Akhtar Trust ==
Before being designated as a terrorist organization, Jaish-e-Mohammed established the Al-Akhtar Trust (Arabic: ثقة الأختر, romanized: Thiqat alʼkhtr) in Pakistan. The group mostly funded Al-Qaeda and the Taliban and its associates with food, water, and clothing for orphans of "martyrs". The organization also funded terrorism in Iraq before being designated as a terrorist organization funder by the United States on October 14, 2003.

== Notable attacks ==
- The group, in co-ordination with Lashkar-e-Taiba, has been implicated in the 2001 Indian Parliament attack in New Delhi.
- It has been suspected in the murder of American journalist Daniel Pearl in Karachi.
- Rahul Gandhi kidnap plot was a failed plot of this militant group to kidnap a prominent Indian political personality in lieu of 42 militant imprisoned in India. Several newspapers reported that the political personality was Rahul Gandhi, scion of the India's Nehru-Gandhi political dynasty. The three Pakistani nationals were arrested namely Mohammed Abid alias Fateh from Lahore, Yusuf alias Faisal of Multan and Mirza Rashid Beg alias Raja Kajafi of Sialkot.
- An informant, posing as a member of Jaish-e-Mohammed, helped police to arrest four people allegedly plotting to bomb a New York City synagogue as well as to shoot Stinger missiles at military aircraft in the United States. The arrest of the four took place in May 2009. One of the four, by the name of James Cromitie, allegedly expressed the desire to join Jaish-e-Mohammed. This expression allegedly took place approximately a year prior to this arrest.
- In January 2016, members of the group were suspected of carrying out the Pathankot attack.
- On 18 September 2016, the group was accused of carrying out an attack over an army camp at Uri, Kashmir.
- On 14 February 2019, a suicide bomber of the group, Adil Ahmad Dar, carried out a suicide bombing attack on a convoy of security vehicles near Pulwama, Jammu & Kashmir, killing at least 40 CRPF personnel.

== See also ==
- List of Deobandi organisations
- 2009 detention of Americans by Pakistan
- Insurgency in Jammu and Kashmir
- Abdul Rauf Asghar
- Khuddam ul-Islam

== Bibliography ==
- Abou Zahab, Mariam; Roy, Olivier (2004) [First published in French in 2002], Islamist Networks: The Afghan-Pakistan Connection, translated by King, John, C. Hurst & Co. Publishers, ISBN 978-1-85065-704-0
- Bowen, Innes (2014), Medina in Birmingham, Najaf in Brent: Inside British Islam, Hurst, ISBN 978-1-84904-529-2
- Cronin, Audrey Kurth; Aden, Huda; Frost, Adam; Jones, Benjamin (6 February 2004), "Foreign Terrorist Organizations" (PDF), CRS Report for Congress, Washington, D.C.: Congressional Research Service: 40–43, archived from the original (PDF) on 18 February 2008
- Fair, C. Christine (2014), Fighting to the End: The Pakistan Army's Way of War, Oxford University Press, ISBN 978-0-19-989271-6
- Gregory, Shaun (2007), "The ISI and the War on Terrorism", Studies in Conflict & Terrorism, 30 (12): 1013–1031, doi:10.1080/10576100701670862, ISSN 1057-610X, S2CID 71331428
- Gunaratna, Rohan; Kam, Stefanie (2016), Handbook of Terrorism in the Asia–Pacific, World Scientific, ISBN 978-1-78326-997-6
- Honawar, Rohit (November 2005), Jaish-e-Mohammed (PDF), New Delhi: Institute of Peace and Conflict Studies
- Jaffrelot, Christophe (2015), The Pakistan Paradox: Instability and Resilience, Oxford University Press, ISBN 978-0-19-023518-5
- Majidyar, Ahmad (June 2010), Could the Taliban Take Over Pakistan's Punjab Province? (PDF), American Enterprise Institute for Public Policy Research
- Moj, Muhammad (2015), The Deoband Madrassah Movement: Countercultural Trends and Tendencies, Anthem Press, ISBN 978-1-78308-389-3
- Moore, John (2001). "The Evolution of Islamic Terrorism: An Overview". Frontline: Target America. PBS Online and WGBH/Frontline.
- Popovic, Milos (2015), "The Perils of Weak Organization: Explaining Loyalty and Defection of Militant Organizations Toward Pakistan", Studies in Conflict & Terrorism, 38 (11): 919–937, doi:10.1080/1057610X.2015.1063838, ISSN 1057-610X, S2CID 108668097
- Rashid, Ahmed (2012), Descent into Chaos: How the War Against Islamic Extremism is Being Lost in Pakistan, Afghanistan and Central Asia, Penguin Books Limited, ISBN 978-0-14-191909-6
- Riedel, Bruce O. (2012), Deadly Embrace: Pakistan, America, and the Future of the Global Jihad, Brookings Institution Press, ISBN 978-0-8157-2274-8
- "Foreign Terrorist Organizations (FTOs) Factsheet". United States Department of State. 11 October 2005.
