= Masood Azhar =

Pakistani militant leader (born 1968)

- Born: Muhammad Masood Azhar Alvi; 10 July 1968 (age 58); Bahawalpur, Punjab, Pakistan
- Relatives: Abdul Rauf Azhar (brother)
- Military career
- Allegiance: Harkat-ul-Ansar, Harkat-ul-Mujahideen, Jaish-e-Mohammed

Muhammad Masood Azhar Alvi (Note: Urdu: محمد مسعود اظہر علوی) (born 10 July or 7 August 1968) is a Pakistani militant leader, who is the founder and current leader of militant organisation Jaish-e-Mohammed, a Pakistan-based Islamic Deobandi jihadist organisation. His actions are not limited to the South Asian region; for instance, BBC News described him as "the man who brought jihad to Britain". On 1 May 2019, he was listed as an international terrorist by the United Nations Security Council.

== Early life ==
Muhammad Masood Azhar Alvi was born in Bahawalpur, Punjab, Pakistan on 10 July 1968 (although some sources list his birth date as 7 August 1968) as the third of 11 children. Azhar's father, Allah Bakhsh Shabbir, was the headmaster at a government-run school as well as a cleric with Deobandi leanings, and his family operated a dairy and poultry farm.

Azhar dropped out of mainstream school after class 8 and joined the Jamia Uloom-ul-Islamia, from where he graduated out in 1989 as an alim and was soon appointed as a teacher.

Azhar has also been described as "an old devotee of Haq Nawaz Jhangvi", a radical Deobandi scholar who founded the anti-Shia organisation Sipah-e-Sahaba Pakistan.

== Harkat-ul-Ansar ==
The madrasa was heavily involved with Harkat-ul-Ansar and Azhar was subsequently assumed under its folds, after being enrolled for a jihad training camp in Afghanistan. Despite failing to complete the course; he joined the Soviet–Afghan War and retired after suffering injuries. Thereafter, he was chosen as the head of Harkat's department of motivation. He was also entrusted with the editorial responsibilities for the Urdu-language magazine Sad'e Mujahidin and the Arabic-language Sawte Kashmir.

Azhar later became the general secretary of Harkat-ul-Ansar and visited many international locations to recruit, to raise funds and to spread the message of Pan-Islamism. Among his destinations were Zambia, Abu Dhabi, Saudi Arabia, Mongolia, the United Kingdom and Albania.

Azhar confessed that in 1993 he traveled to Nairobi, Kenya to meet with leaders of al-Itihaad al-Islamiya, an al-Qaeda-aligned Somali group, who had requested money and recruits from Harkat-ul-Mujahideen (HuM). Indian intelligence officials believe that he made at least three trips to Somalia and that he also helped bring Yemeni mercenaries to Somalia.

In August 1993, Azhar entered the United Kingdom for a speaking, fundraising, and recruitment tour. His message of jihad was given at some of Britain's most prestigious Islamic institutions, including the Darul Uloom Bury seminary, Zakariya Mosque, Madina Masjid in Blackburn and Burnley, and Jamia Masjid. His message was that "substantial proportion of the Koran had been devoted to 'killing for the sake of Allah' and that a substantial volume of sayings of the Islamic prophet Muhammad were on the issue of jihad." Azhar made contacts in Britain who helped to provide training and logistical support for the terror plots, including "7/7, 21/7 and the attempt in 2006 to smuggle liquid bomb-making substances on to transatlantic airlines." Rashid Rauf, who was implicated in the 2006 transatlantic aircraft plot, was married to a relative of Azhar.

== Arrest in India ==
In early 1994, Azhar travelled to Srinagar under a fake identity, to ease tensions between Harkat-ul-Ansar's feuding factions of Harkat-ul-Jihad al-Islami and Harkat-ul-Mujahideen. India arrested him in February from Khanabal near Anantnag and imprisoned him for his terrorist activities with the groups. On being arrested, he said "Soldiers of Islam have come from 12 countries to liberate Kashmir. We will answer your carbines with rocket launchers" He was imprisoned at the Badami Bagh Cantonment in Srinagar, Tihar Jail in Delhi, and lastly the Kot Balwal Jail in Jammu (from where he would eventually be released).

In July 1995, six foreign tourists were kidnapped in Jammu and Kashmir. The kidnappers, referring to themselves as Al-Faran (a pseudonym of the Harkat-ul-Mujahideen), included the release of Masood Azhar among their demands. One of the hostages managed to escape whilst another was found in a decapitated state in August. The others were never seen or heard from since 1995. FBI had interrogated Azhar multiple times during his jail-stay on the locus of the kidnappings.

In 1998, U.S.'s Central Intelligence Agency (CIA) in its report stated, "HuA, an Islamic extremist organisation that Pakistan supports in its proxy war against Indian forces in Kashmir, increasingly is using terrorist tactics against Westerners and random attacks on civilians that could involve Westerners to promote its pan-Islamic agenda." CIA also stated that HuA had abducted at least 13 persons, of which 12 were from western countries, in the period from early 1994 to 1998.

=== Release after hijacking ===
Four years later, in December 1999, an Indian Airlines Flight 814 (IC814) en route from Kathmandu in Nepal to New Delhi was hijacked and eventually landed in Kandahar, Afghanistan after being flown to multiple locations. Kandahar at that time was controlled by the Taliban, which was supported by Pakistan's Inter-Services Intelligence. Masood Azhar was one of the three militants demanded to be released in exchange for freeing the hostages. Subsequently, Azhar was freed by the Indian government in a decision criticised by many including Ajit Doval as a "diplomatic failure", and that no one worth any consequence was contacted either by the (then) foreign minister (Jaswant Singh) or the (then) foreign secretary (Lalit Mansingh), and as a consequence, the Indian ambassador could not even get inside the Abu Dhabi airport. The hijackers of IC814 were led by Masood Azhar's brother, Ibrahim Athar. His release from Kot Bhalwal jail was supervised by IPS officer, S. P. Vaid. His younger brother Abdul Rauf Azhar had planned this attack. Once Masood Azhar was handed over to the hijackers, they fled to Pakistani territory. Pakistan had said the hijackers would be arrested if found. The Pakistani government also previously indicated that Azhar would be allowed to return home since he did not face any charges there.

Shortly after his release, Azhar made a public address to an estimated 10,000 people in Karachi. He proclaimed, "I have come here because this is my duty to tell you that Muslims should not rest in peace until we have destroyed India," vowing to liberate the Kashmir region from Indian rule.

In 1999, after Masood's release, the Harkat-ul-Ansar was proscribed by the U.S. and added to the list of banned terrorist organisations. This move forced Harkat-ul-Ansar to change its name to the Harkat-ul-Mujahideen (HuM).

== Jaish-e-Mohammed ==
Azhar planned to start a new outfit named Jaish-e-Mohammed (JeM). He reportedly received assistance from Pakistan's spy agency Inter-Services Intelligence (ISI), the Taliban regime in Afghanistan, Osama bin Laden and multiple Sunni sectarian organisations based in Pakistan. JeM is run by Azhar's family like a family enterprise. Jamia Binoria madrasa linked JeM with the Afghan Taliban.

=== 2001 Indian Parliament attack ===
Jaish-e-Mohammed carried out a string of deadly attacks against Indian targets, including the attack on the Indian parliament in December 2001 that brought India and Pakistan to the brink of a full-scale war. The terrorist attack on the Parliament of India in New Delhi happened on 13 December 2001. The perpetrators belonged to Lashkar-e-Taiba (LeT) and Jaish-e-Mohammed (JeM), both Pakistan-based terrorist organisations. The attack led to the deaths of five terrorists, six Delhi Police personnel, two Parliament Security Service personnel and a gardener – in total 14 – and to increased tensions between India and Pakistan, resulting in the 2001–02 India–Pakistan standoff.

Soon after the Indian parliament attack, on 29 December 2001, Masood Azhar was detained for a year by Pakistani authorities, after diplomatic pressure by India and the International community, in connection with the attack, but was never formally charged. The Lahore High Court ordered an end to the house arrest on 14 December 2002, much to the fury of India. Azhar was never arrested after that.

=== 2008 Mumbai attacks ===
On 7 December 2008, it was claimed that he was among several arrested by the Pakistani government after a military raid on a camp located on the outskirts of Muzaffarabad in connection with the 2008 Mumbai attacks. He continued to live in Bhawalpur. Pakistan's government denied it had arrested Masood Azhar and said it was unaware of his whereabouts On 26 January 2014, Azhar reappeared after a seclusion of two years. He addressed a rally in Muzaffarabad, calling for the resumption of jihad in Kashmir. In March 2014, a spokesperson of Jaish-e-Mohammed claimed that he was in Srinagar, India.

=== 2016 Pathankot attack ===
The 2016 Pathankot attack on an Indian air base is said to have been masterminded by Masood Azhar and his brother Abdul Rauf Azhar. They were in direct touch with terrorists even after the attack had begun. Indian investigative agencies have given dossiers containing proofs of Azhar's complicity in the terror attack and also sought a second ʽred corner noticeʼ from ʽInterpolʼ.

=== 2019 Pulwama attack ===
On 14 February 2019, a convoy of vehicles carrying security personnel on the Jammu–Srinagar National Highway was attacked by a vehicle-bound suicide bomber in Lethpora near Awantipora, Pulwama district, Jammu and Kashmir, India. The attack resulted in the death of 44 Central Reserve Police Force (CRPF) personnel and the attacker. The responsibility for the attack was claimed by Jaish-e-Mohammed. He approved the attacks from the Pakistani Army Hospital where he is under protective custody. After the attack, France, United Kingdom and United States moved a proposal at UN Security Council to ban Masood.

=== Funding methods ===
According to Indian intelligence reports from 2025, Masood Azhar and his family were linked to a network of digital wallets used to finance Jaish-e-Mohammed’s (JeM) operations. These wallets, operating through platforms such as EasyPaisa and SadaPay, were allegedly managed by Azhar’s son Abdullah Azhar, his brother Talha Al Saif, and other senior JeM figures. The reports indicated that funds were initially collected in primary wallets and then distributed to multiple secondary accounts, with approximately 30 new wallets created each month to avoid detection. This method, described as a form of “digital hawala,” was believed to have facilitated a significant portion of JeM’s financial activity, including arms purchases, operational costs, and support for Azhar’s family, with Pakistan’s intelligence agency Inter Services Intelligence (ISI) reportedly enabling the migration of JeM’s funding to these platforms.

=== Loss of family members during the 2025 India–Pakistan conflict ===
On 7 May 2025, India conducted missile strikes against terrorist camps in Pakistan, in retaliation for the Pahalgam attack, including Jaish-e-Mohammed's camp in Bahawalpur. Masood Azhar reported the loss of ten family members, including his older sister and her husband, his nephew and his nephew's wife, his niece and five children from his family. He however, did not list his brother (Abdul Rauf Azhar) among those killed. In September 2025, JeM commander Masood Ilyas Kashmiri stated that Maulana Masood Azhar’s family was “torn into pieces” by Indian forces during the strikes on the group’s headquarters in Bahawalpur. Speaking at the Mission Mustafa Conference, Kashmiri expressed outrage over the attack, revealing that Azhar’s family members were killed despite their "sacrifices" in what he described as a jihad to protect Pakistan’s borders. His statement marked a rare public acknowledgment of the operation’s impact, with a separate note attributing the death of ten family members and four close associates to an Indian strike on Jamia Masjid Subhan Allah.

== Sanctions ==
The U.S. Treasury is prohibiting Americans from "engaging in any transactions" with three Pakistan-based militants and a front group. Al Rehmat Trust, called "an operational front" for Jaish-e-Mohammed, was designated for providing support to and for acting for or on behalf of that group and Azhar was designated as a Specially Designated Global Terrorist on the Specially Designated Nationals and Blocked Persons List for acting on behalf of the group.

The Chinese government blocked a UN Security Council Sanctions Committee listing of Azhar as a terrorist, thwarting international efforts to disrupt the activities of his group. Starting in 2009, there had been 4 attempts to put Masood Azhar on the UN Security Council's counter-terrorism sanctions list. All the attempts were vetoed by China, citing 'lack of evidence'. China moved to protect Azhar again in October 2016 when it blocked India's appeal to the United Nations to label him as a terrorist. China also blocked the US move to get Azhar banned by the UN in February 2017. The most recent attempt was on 13 March 2019. However, China pulled the blockade in May 2019, finally resulting listing of Masood Azhar as a global terrorist by the Al-Qaida and Taliban Sanctions Committee.

== Bibliography ==
=== Books and booklets by him ===
Described as a "prolific writer", he has authored some 20 books mainly on jihad, including:

- Fatah-ul-Jawad, described by scholar Ayesha Siddiqa as "his seminal work", it is a book on jihad "with two volumes of 2,000 pages each."
- Faz̤āʼil-i jihād, kāmil. On the importance of Jihad; a 850-page commentary on Mashāriʻal-Ashwāq ilʹa-Maṣariʻ al-ʻUshshāq by the medieval scholar Ibn an-Naḥās. In 2002, it was estimated that some 20,000 copies of this book had been sold in Pakistan.
- Yahūd kī cālīs bīmāryān̲ ("Forty Diseases Of The Jews"). Middle East Media Research Institute noted that it may be one of the most antisemitic books of the Urdu language, with 424 pages and 440 Qur'anic verses quoted. He has criticized the whole of Judaism, calling it "another name for those beliefs, ideas, and practices which were invented by Satan."
- Muskurāte zak̲h̲m. Political autobiography.
- K̲h̲ut̤bāt-i jihād. Islamic sermons in two volumes on the eminence of Jihad according to the teachings of Islam.
- Rang o nūr. Collected columns chiefly on jihad and criticising the Pakistani government for following United States policies.
- Jamāl-i Jamīl. On the life of Muḥammd Jamīl K̲h̲ān, 1953–2004, a noted religious scholar.
- Zād-i mujāhid : maʻ maktūbāt-i k̲h̲ādim. On the eminence, views and interpretation of Jihad.
- 7 din raushnī ke jazīre par. 7 Days comprehensive course on Islamic teaching.
- Tuḥfah-yi saʻādat. Study of God's names in the Qur'an.

=== Books and booklets about him ===
- Maulānā Masʻūd Aẓhar, mujāhid yā dahshatgard by Muḥammad T̤āriq Maḥmūd Cug̲h̲tāʼī.
- Asīr-i Hind : Maulānā Masʻūd Aẓhar ke paidāʼish parvarish jihād men̲ shirkat by ʻAbdullāh Masʻūd.

== See also ==
- Abdul Rauf Azhar
- Mullah Omar
- List of Deobandis
