= 2016 in India =

- Centuries: 19th; 20th; 21st
- Decades: 1990s; 2000s; 2010s; 2020s
- See also: List of years in India; Timeline of Indian history

The following lists events that happened during 2016 in India.

== Incumbents ==
Photo	Post	Name
	President	Pranab Mukherjee
	Vice President	Mohammad Hamid Ansari
	Prime Minister	Narendra Modi
	Chief Justice	T. S. Thakur

=== Governors ===
Post	Name
Andhra Pradesh	E. S. L. Narasimhan
Arunachal Pradesh	Jyoti Prasad Rajkhowa (until 9 July); Tathagata Roy (10 July-12 August); V. Shanmuganathan (starting 14 September)
Assam	Padmanabha Acharya (until 17 August); Banwarilal Purohit (starting 22 August)
Bihar	Ram Nath Kovind
Chhattisgarh	Balram Das Tandon
Goa	Mridula Sinha
Gujarat	Om Prakash Kohli
Haryana	Kaptan Singh Solanki
Himachal Pradesh	Acharya Devvrat
Jammu and Kashmir	Draupadi Murmu
Jharkhand	Draupadi Murmu
Karnataka	Vajubhai Rudabhai Vala
Kerala	P. Sathasivam
Madhya Pradesh	Ram Naresh Yadav
Maharashtra	V. Shanmuganathan
Manipur	Najma A. Heptulla
Meghalaya	Kummanam Rajasekharan
Mizoram	P. S. Sreedharan Pillai
Nagaland	Padmanabha Acharya
Odisha	S. C. Jamir
Punjab	Kaptan Singh Solanki (until 22 August); Vijayendra Pal Singh Badnore (starting 22 August)
Rajasthan	Kalyan Singh
Sikkim	Shriniwas Dadasaheb Patil
Tamil Nadu	Konijeti Rosaiah (until 1 September); C. Vidyasagar Rao (starting 1 September)
Tripura	Tathagata Roy
Uttar Pradesh	Ram Naik
West Bengal	Baby Rani Maurya

== Events ==
=== January ===
- 1 January – The Indian and Pakistani governments exchanged a full list of nuclear sites, military and civilian, in accordance with the 1988 Non-Nuclear Aggression Agreement.
- 2 January – Heavily armed gunmen, reportedly members of Jaish-e-Mohammed, attacked an Indian Air Force base in Pathankot, Punjab. Two of the gunmen were killed.
- 3 January – A magnitude 6.7 earthquake struck India, 29 km (18 mi) west of Imphal, with a maximum Mercalli intensity of VII (Very strong). At least eight people were killed, 100 others were injured, and some buildings were damaged.
- 17 January – A PhD student from University of Hyderabad named Rohith Vemula died by suicide, reportedly due to caste-based discrimination. The event triggered a countrywide agitation against casteism in institutions of higher learning.

=== February ===
- 3 February - A twenty one year old Tanzanian girl was attacked by a mob and paraded naked in Bengaluru suspecting her of a vehicle accident.
- 8 February – Facebook's FreeBasics was declared illegal in India and ceased operations in the country.
- 9 February – A group of JNU students held a campus protest marking the third anniversary of the hanging of Muhammad Afzal Guru.
- 12 February – JNU student-union president Kanhaiya Kumar was arrested on charges of sedition.
- 13 February – Nationwide protests and rallies took place, with students and teachers from multiple universities demonstrating against the arrest of Kanhaiya Kumar.
- 15 February –
  - Lawyers assaulted journalists at the court where Kanhaiya Kumar was scheduled to appear, chanting nationalist slogans.
  - Protests against the arrest of Kanhaiya Kumar continued at JNU, with a campus strike disrupting classes.
- 17 February – Kanhaiya Kumar was assaulted inside the court premises, despite heavy police presence.
- 20 February – Militants laid siege to the Entrepreneurship Development Institute
- 22 February – Five JNU students accused of sedition returned to campus after going into hiding.
- 24 February – JNU students Umar Khalid and Anirban Bhattacharya surrendered to police around midnight.

=== March ===
- 14 March – Police horse Shaktiman was attacked with a stick by BJP MLA politician and cabinet minister Ganesh Joshi during a protest organized by BJP against the Chief Minister of Uttarakhand. The attack and the horse's later death sparked worldwide outrage.
- 16 March – RTI activist Vinayak Baliga was murdered in Mangalore by contract killers allegedly linked to Hindutva group NaMo Brigade.
- 18 March – Ahead of polls in West Bengal and Tamil Nadu, Supreme Court of India allows pictures of Union Ministers, Chief Ministers, Governors and State Ministers to appear in government advertisements.
- 31 March – 2016 Kolkata flyover collapse: At least 27 people were killed and 80 others injured in a bridge collapse in Kolkata, West Bengal in India.

=== April ===
- 5 April – Bihar state imposed a liquor ban.
- 5 April – India's fastest train, Gatimaan Express, began operating between Hazrat Nizamuddin and Agra Cantonment, run by Indian Railways.
- 22 April – 21 May - The 2016 Ujjain Simhastha Kumbha Mela was held, attracting nearly 75 million visitors over one month.
- 10 April – The Puttingal temple fire caused 107 deaths.
- 11 April – 2016 Assam Legislative Assembly election – BJP won the majority.
- 29 April – Jisha murder case.

=== May ===
- 2 May – A 17-year-old JEE aspirant named, Kriti Tripathi, died by suicide in Kota, Rajasthan.
- 5 May – 2016 West Bengal Legislative Assembly election – Mamata Banerjee-led TMC won the majority.
- 16 May – 2016 Tamil Nadu Legislative Assembly election- Jayalalithaa-led AIADMK won the majority.
- 16 May – 2016 Puducherry Legislative Assembly election – Congress won the majority.
- 23 May – Hypersonic Flight Experiment: ISRO's RLV-TD vehicle was launched from the first launchpad of Satish Dhawan Space Centre aboard an HS9 rocket booster.
- 30 May – 30 people died following a fire at an army weapons depot in Pulgaon, Wardha district, Maharashtra.
- 31 May – 2016 Bihar school examination scandal: A controversy broke out over the topper scam involving the Bihar School Examination Board.

=== June ===
- 14 June – Anu Bansal suffered burns over 80% of her body after being set on fire by her husband for giving birth to a daughter. She died several days later. It would take her daughters eight years to get justice for her murder.
- 22 June – ISRO launched 20 satellites into space using PSLV-XL.
- 25 June – 2016 Pampore attack.
- 28 June – Government of India accepted the 7th Pay Commission recommendations, increasing salaries of employees.
- 2016 Indian Air Force An-32 disappearance.

=== July ===
- 2 July – At least 30 people died due to heavy rains in Uttarakhand.
- 8 July – 2016 Kashmir Unrest: Violent protests erupt in Kashmir over the killing of Burhan Wani by security forces.
- 11 July - A seven member Dalit family assaulted and flagged in Una by Cow vigilante.

=== August ===
- 3 August – Goods and Services Tax (India) Bill passed in Parliament.
- 5 August – 2016 Kokrajhar shooting occurred.
- 9 August – Manipur activist Irom Sharmila ended her 16-year hunger strike.
- 13 August – Pramukh Swami Maharaj, a Swaminarayan guru, died.
- 14 August – Na. Muthukumar, an Indian Tamil poet, lyricist, and National Award-winning author, died.

=== September ===
- 2 September – Indian general strike of 2016 took place.
- Kaveri River water dispute: Violence broke out in Karnataka.
- 13 September – 43 out of 44 MLAs from the Arunachal Pradesh Legislative Assembly left Congress and joined People's Party of Arunachal.
- 18 September – 2016 Uri attack: Four Jaish-e-Mohammed terrorists attacked an Indian Army brigade headquarters in Uri near the Line of Control, killing 19 soldiers in a pre-dawn ambush.
- 22 September – Tamil Nadu Chief Minister Jayalalithaa was hospitalized at Apollo Hospital.
- 29 September – 2016 Indian Line of Control strike: The Indian Army conducted a surgical strike in response to the Uri attack.
- 30 September – Bihar liquor ban: The Patna High Court struck down liquor ban law.

=== October ===
- 2 October – 2016 Baramulla attack occurred.
- 11 October – Jangaon district was formed in Telangana.
- 13 October – BJP joined People's Party of Arunachal- led Government in Arunachal Pradesh.
- 15 October – 24 people died in a stampede at a religious gathering in Varanasi.
- 17 October – A fire at SUM Hospital in Bhubaneshwar killed 22 died.
- 19 October – In the Qnet multi-level marketing case, former World Billiards Champion Michael Ferreira was arrested.
- 24 October – Cyrus Mistry was removed as the Chairman of the Tata Sons, one of India's largest conglomerates.
- 27 October – In the Senari massacre case in Bihar, 15 were convicted and 23 acquitted; 10 received death sentences.
- October – Bihar liquor ban: The Supreme Court stayed the High Court order, reimposing the ban.
- October – Samajwadi Party, ruling Uttar Pradesh, was embroiled in a family feud.
- 31 October – October 2016 Bhopal encounter occurred.

=== November ===
- 1 November – 2016 Manipur unrest began.
- 8 November – The Indian government demonetized ₹500 and ₹1000 banknotes with immediate effect, causing political uproar.
- 11 November – 42 Congress MLAs resigned from the Punjab Vidhan Sabha following a Supreme Court ruling on the Sutlej Yamuna link canal project.
- 16 November – The winter session of Indian Parliament began, with debates on demonetization.
- 20 November – A train derailsment near Pukhrayan killed at least 150 people.
- 26 November – Nabha jailbreak in Punjab. Six inmates escaped.
- 29 November – 2016 Nagrota army base attack occurred.
- 30 November – The Supreme Court of India ordered cinemas to play national anthem before films.

=== December ===
- 5 December – Former Tamil Nadu Chief Minister J Jayalalithaa died after 72 days of hospitalization at Apollo Hospital.
- 10 December – Industrialist Pawan Ruia was arrested following a railway complaint.
- 12 December – Cyclone Vardah makes landfall on the Tamil Nadu coast. 18 people died.
- 14 December – The National Green Tribunal banned kite-flying with manja, a glass-coated thread, due to safety concerns.
- 15 December – Supreme Court banned liquor sales on national and state highways to reduce road accidents caused by drunk driving.
- 24 December – Prime Minister, Narendra Modi laid the foundation for the Pune Metro Project; construction began.
- 25 December – In the 2013 Indian helicopter bribery scandal: arrests were made, including a former Indian Air Force chief.
- 29 December – 2016 Ariyalur gang rape case occurred.

== Publications ==
- "Devlok" by Devdutt Pattanaik
- "One Indian Girl" by Chetan Bhagat

== Deaths ==
=== January ===
- 2 January
  - Ardhendu Bhushan Bardhan, Indian politician (b. 1924)
  - Fateh Singh, shooter and army officer (b. 1964)
- 3 January
  - Shankar Prasad Jaiswal, Indian politician (b. 1932)
  - Raghu Nandan Mandal, Indian politician (b. 1952)
- 4 January – S. H. Kapadia, Indian judge (b. 1947)
- 6 January – Labhshankar Thakar, Gujarati author (b. 1935)
- 7 January – Mufti Mohammad Sayeed, Indian politician (b. 1936)
- 8 January
  - M. O. Joseph, Malayalam film producer (b. 1929)
  - Gunaram Khanikar, herbalist (b. 1949)
- 13 January
  - J. F. R. Jacob, army general (b. 1923)
  - G A Vadivelu, independence activist and politician (b. 1923)
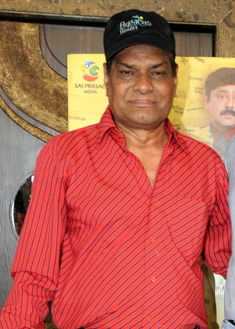
- Rajesh Vivek
  14 January – Rajesh Vivek, actor (b. 1949)
- 15 January – Anil Ganguly, film director (b. 1933)
- 16 January – Ananda Chandra Dutta, botanist (b. 1923)
- 17 January
  - Geethapriya, film director (b. 1932)
  - V. Rama Rao, politician (b. 1935)
  - Sudhindra Thirtha, Hindu religious leader (b. 1926)
  - Rohith Vemula, PhD scholar. (b. 1989)
- 18 January – Asha Patil, actress (b. 1936)
- 20 January – Subrata Bose, politician (b. 1932)
- 21 January – Mrinalini Sarabhai, classical dancer, choreographer and instructor (b. 1918)
- 22 January – Shankar Ghosh, tabla player (b. 1935)
- 23 January – A. C. Jose, politician (b. 1937)
- 25 January
  - Kalpana, Malayalam actress (b. 1965)
  - Jashubhai Dhanabhai Barad, politician (b. 1955)
  - Padmarani, Gujarati actress (b. 1936)
- 28 January – Maheswar Baug, politician and independence activist (b. 1930)
- 29 January – Nayani Krishnakumari, writer and folklorist (b. 1930)
- 30 January
  - T. N. Gopakumar, journalist (b. 1957)
  - K. V. Krishna Rao, military officer (b. 1923)
  - Kollam G. K. Pillai, actor (b. 1933)
- 31 January – Randhir Singh, political scientist (b. 1921)

=== February ===
- 1 February – Kunigal Ramanath, 83, Kannada actor.
- 3 February –
  - Balram Jakhar, 92, politician, Speaker of the Lok Sabha (1980–1989).
  - K. S. Paripoornan, 83, Supreme Court judge
- 5 February – Markand Bhatt, 87, theatre director and actor.
- 6 February – Sudhir Tailang, 55, cartoonist.
- 8 February – Nida Fazli, 77, poet.
- 13 February – O. N. V. Kurup, 84, poet, recipient of the Jnanpith Award (2007).
- 17 February – Akbar Kakkattil, 62, writer.
- 18 February –
  - Abdul Rashid Khan, 107, Hindustani musician.
  - Cherussery Zainuddeen Musliyar, 78, Indian religious scholar.
- 20 February – Pradeep Shakti, 60, actor and restaurateur.
- 21 February –
  - Akbar Ali, 90, Kannada poet.
  - Kalanidhi Narayanan, 87, classical dancer.
- 25 February – Bhavarlal Jain, 78, businessman (Jain Irrigation Systems).
- 26 February
  - Mirza Mohammed Athar, 79, Muslim cleric.
  - B. K. Garudachar, 99, cricket player.
- 27 February
  - Banda Jyothi, 41, comedian and actress.
  - Rajesh Pillai, 41, film director (Traffic).
- 28 February –
  - Honey Chhaya, 85, film director and actor (The Best Exotic Marigold Hotel).
  - Kumarimuthu, 76, comedian and film actor.
- 29 February – Nihal Ahmed Maulavi Mohammed Usman, 90, politician, Maharashtra MLA (1960–1999), mayor of Malegaon.

=== April ===
- 20 April – Shaktiman, Uttarakhand police horse.

=== June ===
- 4 June – Sulabha Deshpande, 79, Veteran actress.

=== July ===
- 23 July – S. H. Raza, Famous painter.

=== August ===
- 9 August – Kalikho Pul, 47, former Chief Minister of Arunachal Pradesh

=== October ===
- 10 October – Parmeshwar Godrej, 70, philanthropist and socialite.

=== November ===
- 22 November
  - M. Balamuralikrishna, 86, Carnatic vocalist
  - M. G. K. Menon, 88, physicist

=== December ===
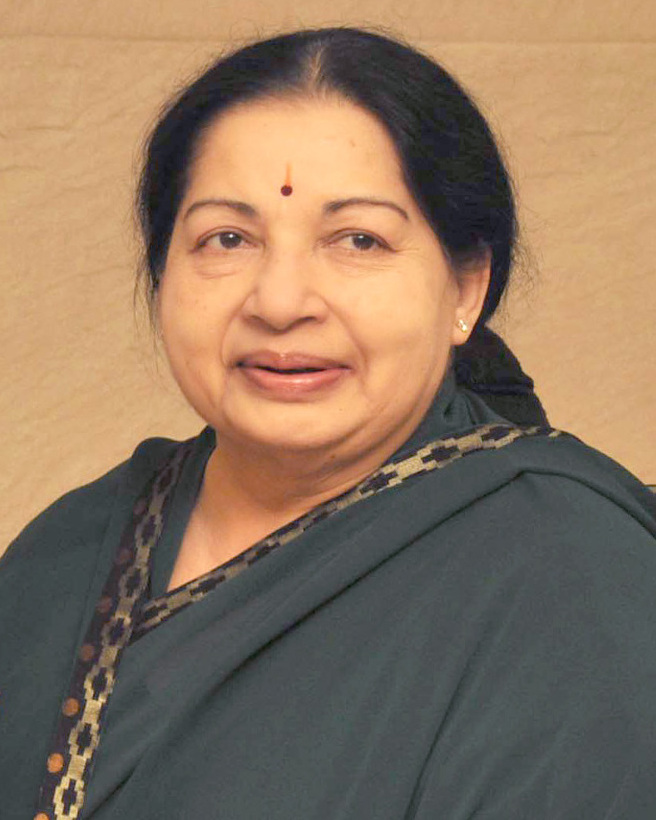
- Jayalalithaa
  5 December – Jayalalithaa, 68, Chief Minister of Tamil Nadu
- 7 December – Cho Ramaswamy, 82, actor, political satirist, journalist, lawyer
- 24 December – Chetan Ramarao, 76, Kannada film actor

== See also ==
- 2016 attacks on India
- Timeline of Indian history
