= Garud Commando Force =

Indian Air Force unit

- Garud Winged Badge
- Founded: 6 February 2004 – present (22 years, 9 months)
- Country: India
- Allegiance: Indian Armed Forces
- Branch: Indian Air Force
- Type: Special Forces
- Size: 1,080-1,500 (est.) (Classified)
- Headquarters: Garud Regimental Training Centre, Hindon Air Force Station, Ghaziabad, Uttar Pradesh
- Patron: Garuda
- Mottos: Pṛāhaar Se Surākshā (Hindi) transl. "Defence by Offence"
- Engagements: MONUC (Congo); 2016 Pathankot attack Insurgency in Jammu and Kashmir
- Decorations: 1 Ashoka Chakra; 8 Shaurya Chakra

Insignia
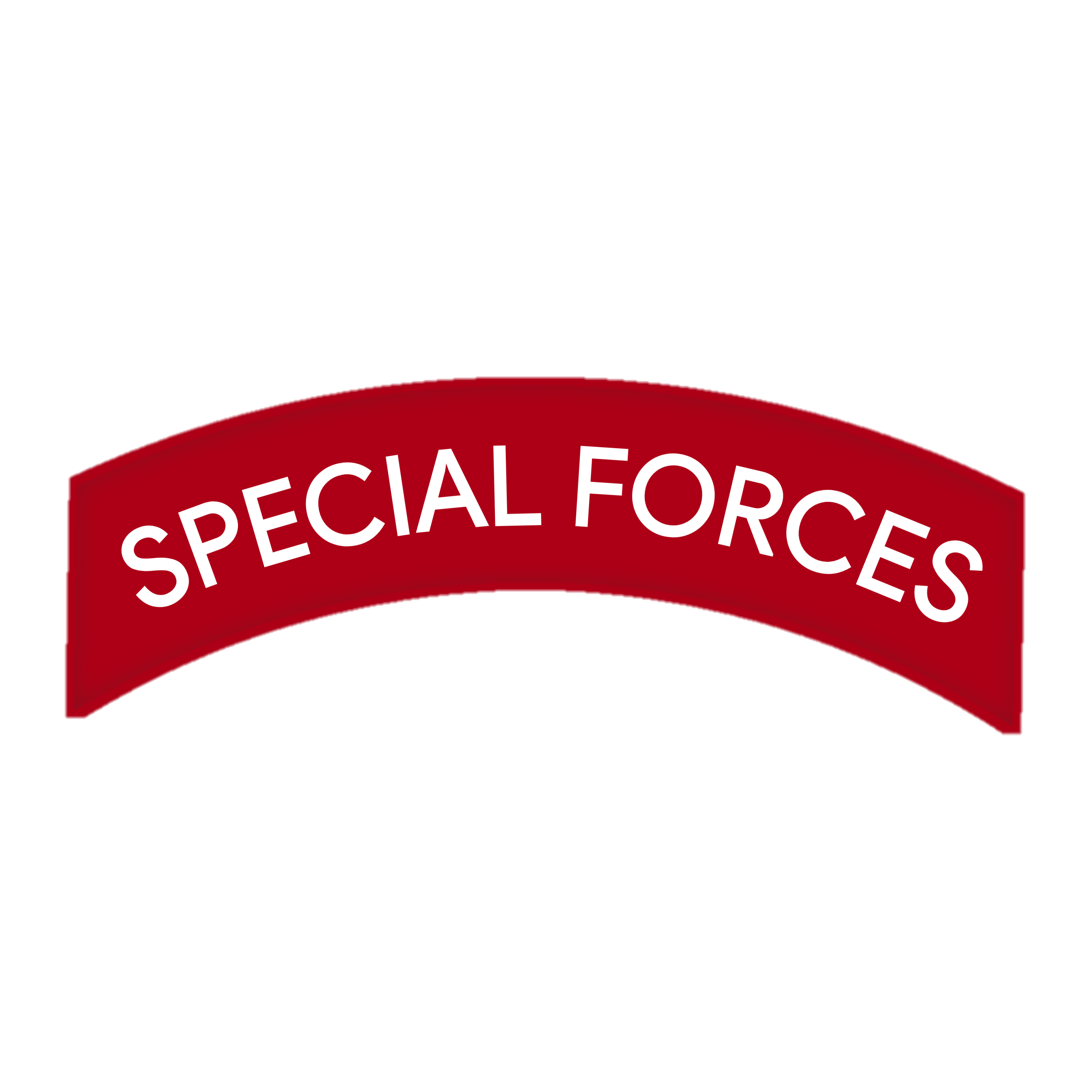
- Special Forces shoulder tab

- Sleeve patch

The Garud Commando Force is the special forces unit of the Indian Air Force. It was formed on 6 February 2004. The unit derives its name from Garuda, a Hindu deity.

Garud forces are tasked with protecting critical Air Force bases and installations, search and rescue, and providing relief during disasters or calamities. In 2004, Garuds were deployed in the Congo as part of the UN peace keeping operations.

== History ==
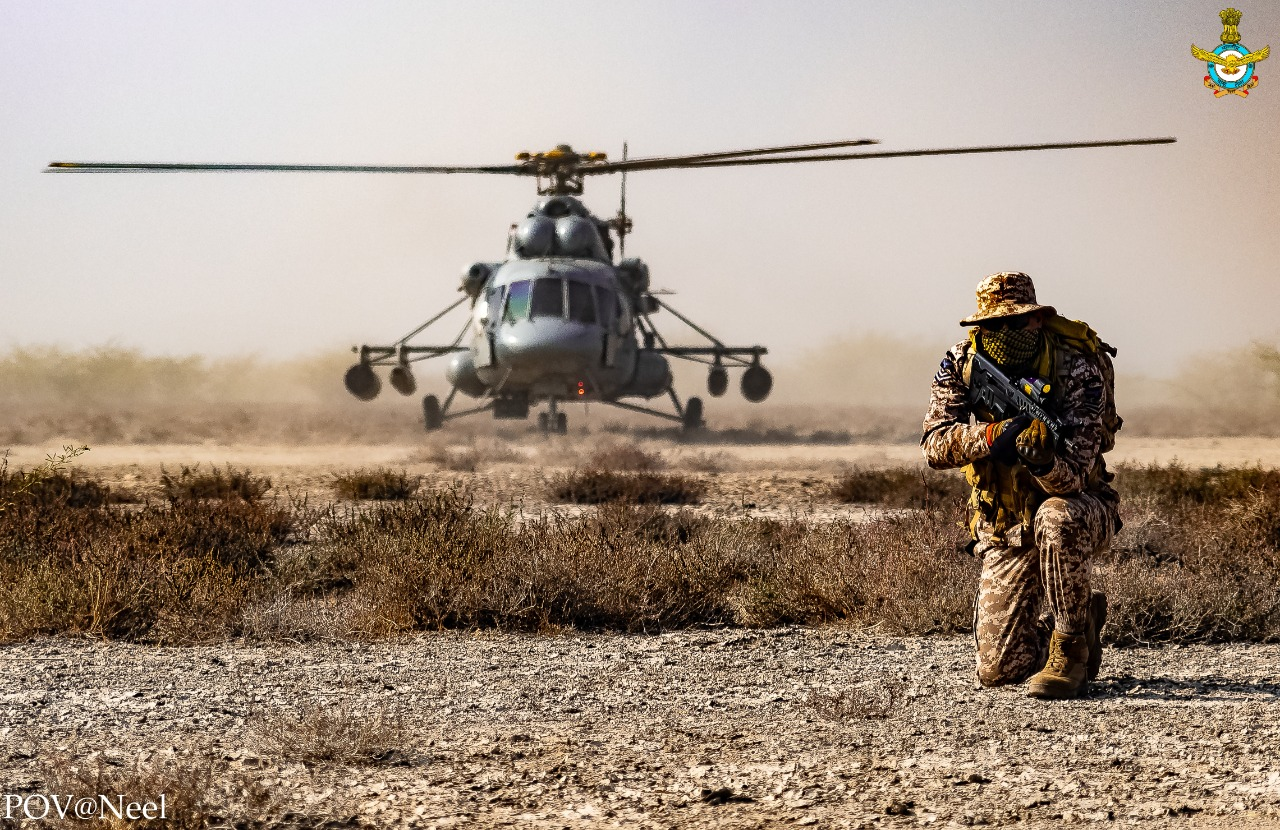
IAF Garud commando

After attempts by terrorists to attack two major air bases in Jammu and Kashmir in 2001, Indian Air Force commanders felt the need for a specialized force to protect these critical assets and to have a dedicated Commando Force trained in Special Forces techniques such as Counter Insurgency (COIN) Operations, Combat Search and Rescue, Reconnaissance, for encountering and neutralizing the airfield based terror-threats.

While the Army might have provided some Special Forces units to the Air Force, these units were always subject to being posted out on rotation to other areas as per the Army's requirements. It was felt that the specialized training the Air Force would have provided for such units would have to be repeated for the replacement units. The initial plans mooted in October 2002 called for a specialized force with 2,000 commandos. The proposed force was originally called "Tiger Force", but was later renamed "Garud Force". To address the need for a dedicated force, in September 2003, the Government of India authorized a 1,080-strong force to be raised and trained on the lines of the Army's Para Commandos and the Indian Navy's MARCOS, with the mandate of performing niche, Air Force specific operational tasks.

Soon after, the first batch of 100 volunteers from the IAF No.1 Airmen Training Center at Belgaum, Karnataka were earmarked to undergo Garud Training at Gurgaon. The Garuds were first unveiled on 6 February 2004, when the first batch of 62 "Air Commandos" passed out of training in New Delhi. The Garuds were first seen publicly during the Air Force Day celebrations in New Delhi on 8 October 2004. In the aftermath of the Pathankot Terror Attack, the Indian Air Force decided to raise ten additional squadrons of Garud commandos, comprising about 700 personnel, bringing the total strength of the force to 1780.

== Responsibilities ==
The mandated tasks of the Garuds include direct action, special reconnaissance, rescuing downed pilots in hostile territory, establishing airbases in hostile territory, and providing air traffic control to these airbases. The Garuds also execute the suppression of enemy air defenses and destruction of other enemy assets such as radars, evaluation of the outcomes of Indian airstrikes and use laser designators to guide Indian airstrikes. The security of IAF installations and assets are usually performed by the Air Force Police and the Defence Security Corps even though some critical assets are protected by the Garuds.

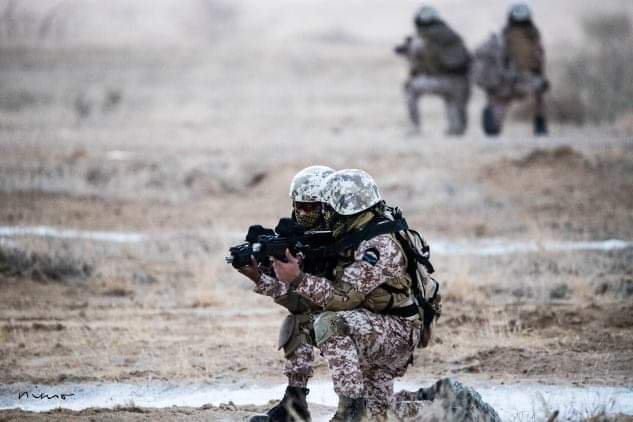
Garud Commandos at Exercise Vayu Shakti 2019

Their airbase protection task also includes, when necessary, rendering inaccessible weapons systems and other assets by sealing them off. The tasks they perform also includes counter-terrorism, airborne assault, anti-hijacking, hostage rescue and assist civilian relief operations during calamities.

== Organization ==
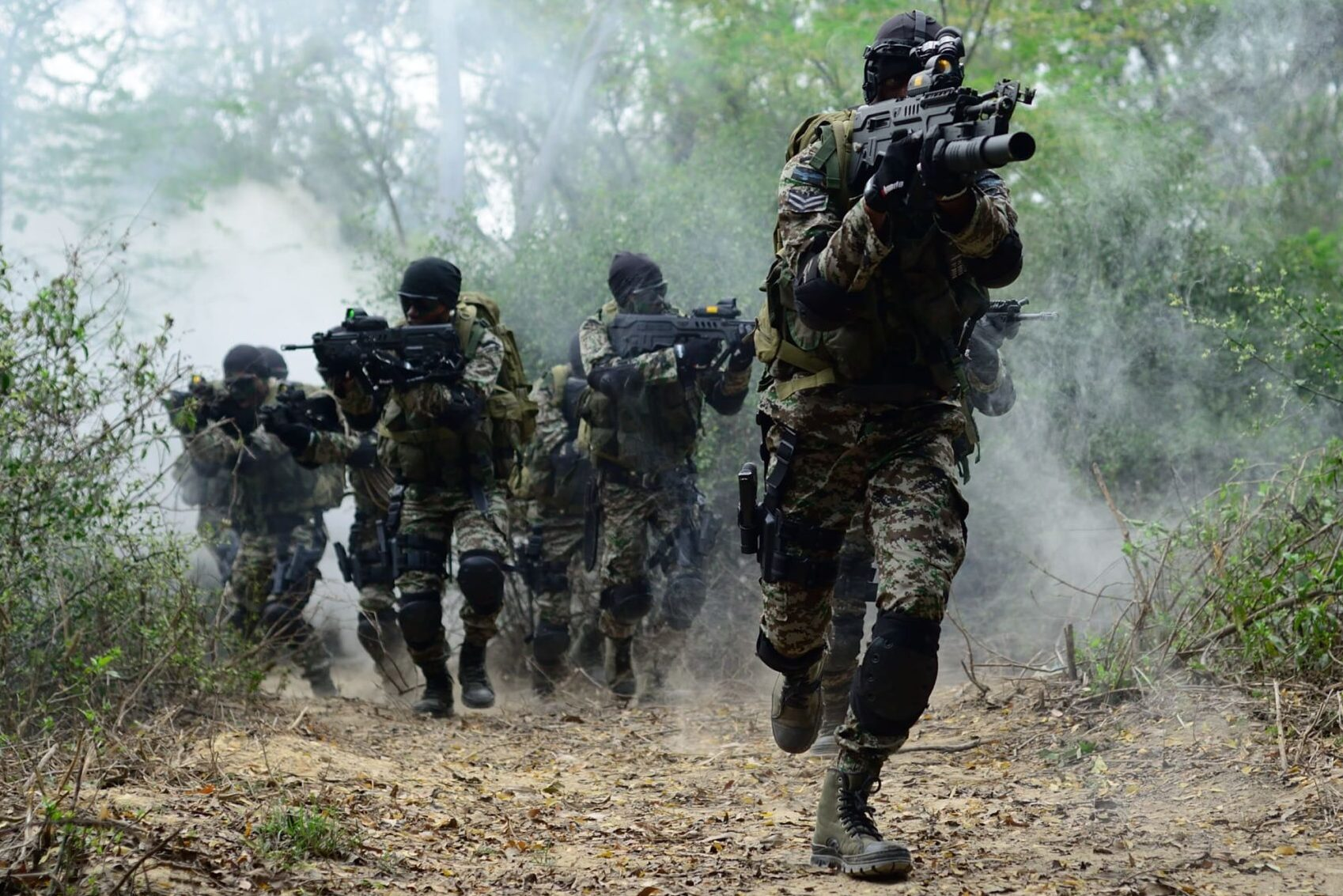
Garud Commandos

Garud personnel are enlisted as airmen in the Indian Air Force. The Garud commandos are organized into fifteen 'flights'. These flights are deployed at air force stations. Each flight is led by an officer who holds the rank of a Squadron Leader or a Flight Lieutenant and is composed of around 60 to 70 men who usually operate in squads of 14 soldiers. The Garud Commando Force includes 27 flights with an overall reported strength of over 1,600 personnel as of 2025. A Wing Commander-ranked officer commands the force. Additional personnel are planned to be added to the force.

=== Airmen Selection Process ===
Unlike its counterparts in the Army and Navy, candidates for Garud Commandos are not selected from volunteers of other branches. Recruitment to the Garuds is done directly through airmen selection centers via advertisements. Candidates found eligible for the force are put through a process of rigorous physical training. Candidates have only one chance to become a Garud trainee. Once a recruit completes training and meets the required standards, he is absorbed into the Commando force and is retained in this stream throughout his career. Wherever he is posted in the IAF, he will be part of a Garud Unit. This approach ensures that the Commando Force retains its highly trained men throughout their career with the IAF. The first batch of Officers for the Garuds were volunteers from the Cadets of the Ground Duty Officers course being trained at the Air Force Academy, Dundigal, Telangana. After successful completion, these officers will be inducted and permanently assigned to the Garud Force for advancing to higher postings. Training is also conducted along with the Indian Army personnel at the Rashtriya Military School in Belgaum, Karnataka.

== Insignias and Uniforms ==
Garud airmen wear the "Airman Beret Badge" on the cap. They are also parachute-trained and wear the para wings above the right pocket. The "Garud Force Patch" can be seen worn on the sleeve. The Garud Commando Badge, which was worn on the right pocket and resembles the NSG badge, is no longer in use. Instead, they now have a Garud Winged Badge, which is gold in color and worn on the left chest, similar to where pilot/aircrew wings are worn. The Garuds used to wear a black beret, instead of the traditional maroon beret of the other Indian Special Forces units. At present, they wear the maroon beret. They sport the operational paratrooper's brevet on the right chest. The formation insignia is worn on the left shoulder. The Garuds are also entitled to wear "IAF GARUD" titles on the sleeves.

=== Training ===
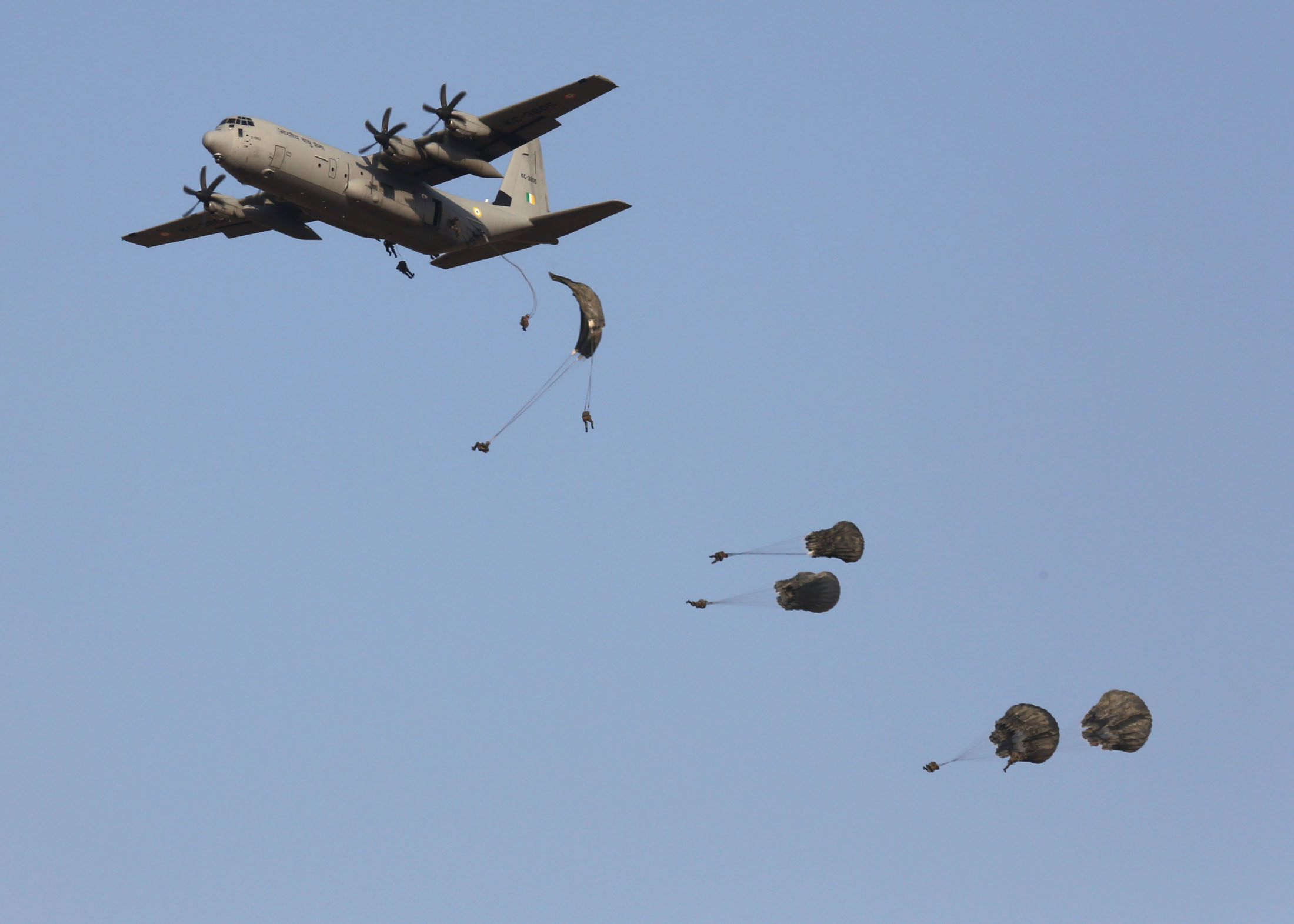
Garud Commandos para-dropping at Exercise Iron Fist at Pokhran in 2013

Garud trainees undergo a 52-week training. The Basic Training course is the longest among all the Indian special forces regiments. The training duration before a trainee can qualify as a fully operational Garud is 3 years. The initial phase is a three-month probationary training, depending on the promising candidates, for the next phases of training. This phase, which usually has a high attrition (Drop-out) rate, is conducted at the Garud Regimental Training Centre located at Hindon, Ghaziabad (New Delhi). The subsequent phase of special operations training is imparted by the Special Frontier Force, the Army's Para SF, and NSG. Those who qualify proceed to the Parachute Training School (PTS) at Agra to complete the basic airborne phase. Trainees are trained along with paratroopers of the Indian Army.

Further phases concentrate on niche fields like jungle and snow survival, demolition, etc. Garuds also train at the diving school of the Indian Navy and the Army's Counter Insurgency and Jungle Warfare School (CIJWS). The final phase of training is active operations, being attached to the Rashtriya Rifles of the Indian Army, which helps the Garuds in gaining operational experience. After induction, the commandos also undergo continuous advanced training, including anti-hijacking, counter-insurgency training, forest trekking, snow survival techniques, specialized weapons handling, and advanced diving skills.

== Operational deployments ==
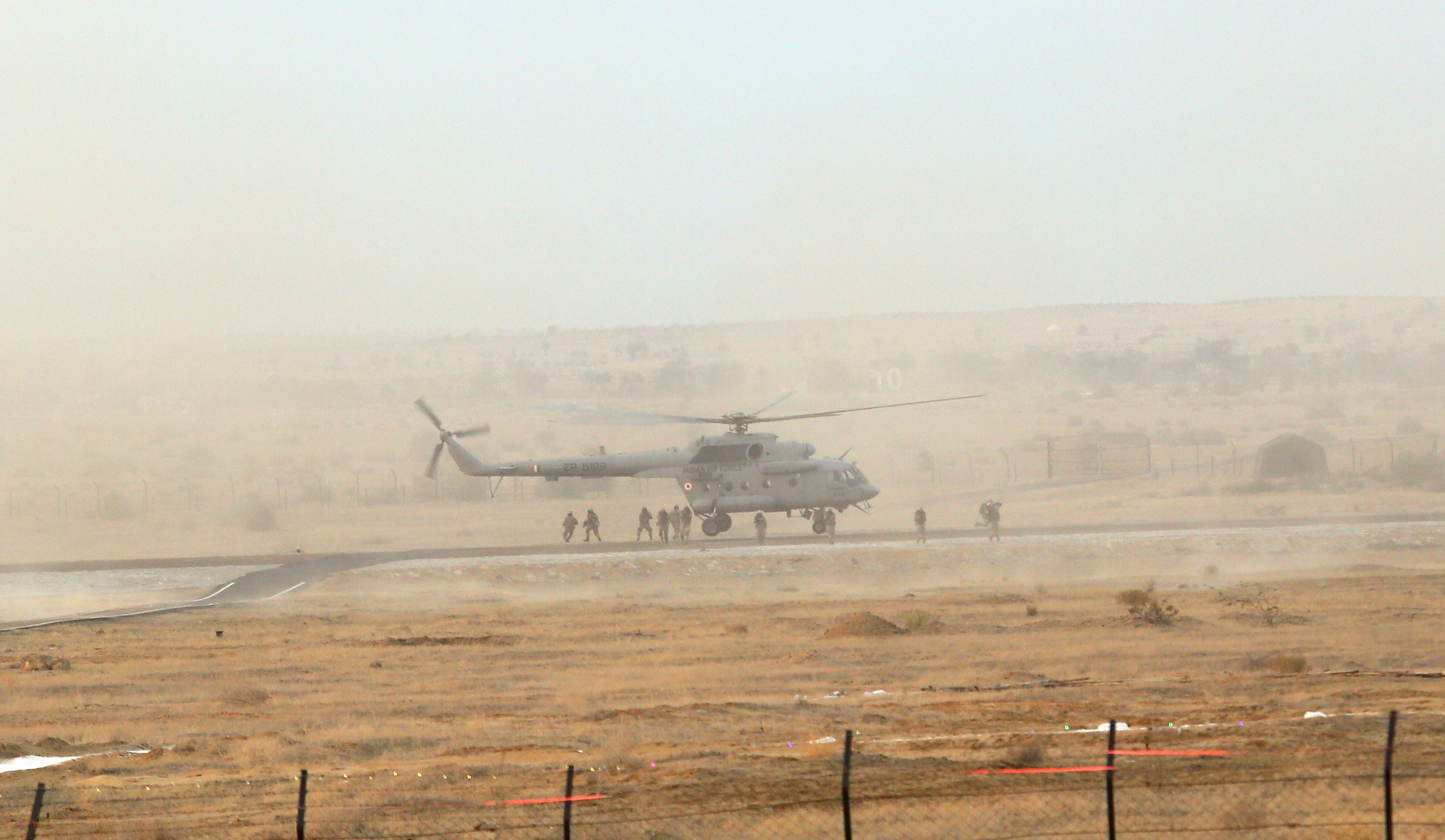
A helicopter extracting Garud Commandos at Vayu Shakti 2019

Garud commando operations and assignments are classified in nature. Garuds have been deployed to Congo as part of the UN peacekeeping contingent. They also operate alongside special forces of the Indian Army in Jammu and Kashmir to gain operational exposure. Towards this purpose, teams from the flights are attached to Army SF units. The Garuds are now active in the region of Jammu and Kashmir, carrying out counter-insurgency operations and neutralizing terrorists in the region. Garud commandos were tasked to provide security at the Yelahanka AFS during Aero India (2005-2013).

=== 2013 Chhattisgarh helicopter shootdown ===
On 18 January 2013, an IAF helicopter, with two Garud commandos as part of the security crew, while on a casualty evacuation sortie, was hit by 15 bullets fired by Naxalites and crashed in Sukma district, Chhattisgarh. When Yamlal Sahu was operating the police radio, he was wounded by bullets piercing his intestines.

=== 2016 Pathankot attack ===
On 2 January 2016, during the 2016 Pathankot attack, a Garud team engaged the intruding terrorists in a firefight, during which Garud Commando Gursewak Singh was martyred. The IAF assets were declared safe.

=== Jammu and Kashmir ===
Garud commandos are actively deployed in the Lolab Valley and the Hajin area of Jammu and Kashmir to conduct counter-insurgency operations. They have undertaken operations against armed militants from groups such as Lashkar-e-Taiba. These operations have included tasks such as direct encounters and intelligence gathering. The following are some of the known operations conducted by Garud commandos:

- Operation Rakh Hajin: This was an operation conducted by Garud commandos in which six militants were killed in the Kashmir Valley. The Ashok Chakra was posthumously awarded to Corporal J.P. Nirala for the same.
- In July 2018, two Garud commandos were Killed In Action (KIA) and two militants were killed during an intense terror attack at Hajin, Bandipora. According to local authorities, the Garud commandos were operating alongside the Special Operations Group (SOG) of the J&K Police and the Indian Army.

=== AFSOD deployments ===
In November 2019, Garud commandos started operating as a part of the first deployment of the Armed Forces Special Operations Division in Jammu and Kashmir.

=== Ladakh ===
When the 2020 China–India tensions began, Garud commandos were deployed near mountain peaks considered by India to have strategic value. Their role was to defend the Indian airspace against Chinese aircraft, for which they employed 9K38 Igla air defense systems.

== Gallantry awards ==
=== Ashoka Chakra ===
In 2018, an AC was posthumously awarded to Corporal Jyoti Prakash Nirala of Unit 617, for displaying outstanding courage by killing two categories ‘A’ based terrorists and injuring two others, in an operation where six terrorists were killed, including the nephew of Zaki-ur-Rehman Lakhvi at Bandipora, Jammu and Kashmir in the year 2017.

=== Vayu Sena Medal ===
- Squadron Leader Rajiv Chauhan was awarded the Vayu Sena Medal (2018) for displaying extraordinary courage and leadership during an operation in Jammu and Kashmir.
- Sergeant Shyam Veer Singh and Squadron Leader Dilip Gurnani were simultaneously conferred the Vayu Sena Medal (2022) for their acts of exceptional courage while being deployed in Jammu and Kashmir.

== Equipment ==
The following equipment and firearms are reportedly used by the Garud Commandos:

=== Small arms ===
Name	Weapon	Type	Caliber	Origin Country	Notes
Handguns
Glock 17	Glock 19	Semi-automatic pistol	9×19mm Parabellum	Austria	Status: In service, as Standard pistol
Beretta 92FS		Semi-automatic pistol	9×19mm Parabellum	Italy	Status: In service, in small numbers.
Beretta M9		Semi-automatic pistol	9×19mm Parabellum	Italy	Status: In service, in small numbers.
IWI Tavor TAR-21	IMI Tavor	Assault rifle	5.56×45mm NATO	Israel	Status: In service Standard issued rifle
AK-103	AK-103 Assault Rifle	Assault Rifle	7.62×39mm	Russia	Status: In service.
IMI Galil 7.62 Sniper	Galil Sniper	Sniper rifle	7.62×51mm NATO	Israel	Status: In service Standard issued Sniper rifle
IWI Negev		Light machine gun	5.56×45mm NATO	Israel	Status: In service, Standard Squad Automatic Weapon of special forces
AK-47 (FAB Defense)		Assault Rifle	7.62×39mm	Israel and Soviet Union	Status: In service, Standard issued 7.62×39mm Assault Rifle.

== See also ==
- Indian Air Force
- Armed Forces Special Operations Division (AFSOD)
- Indian armed forces
- Indian military ranks
- Special Forces of India
