= Chethan Ramarao =

Indian actor

- Born: 1937; Sindhagatta, Kingdom of Mysore
- Died: 23 December 2016 (aged 78–79); Mysuru, Karnataka, India
- Occupation: Actor
- Awards: Kannada Rajyothsava award

Chethan Ramarao (1937–2016) was an Indian actor who appeared in Kannada, Tamil and Telugu films.

== Life ==
Ramarao was born in 1937 at Sindhaghatta in KR Pete taluk in Mandya district of Karnataka. He became interested in theatre when he was young and later joined Gubbi Veeranna's theatre company. He later entered film industry at the age of 19 and acted in more than 350 films in his five decades long career, mostly in supportive roles. Kala Vilasi Sangha was his debut film. His notable films are Post Master, Nanu Neenu Jodi, Anuradha, Kallu Sakkare and Bedi Bandavalu.

He died on 23 December 2016 in Mysuru, Karnataka following kidney ailment.

== Awards ==
He had received the Kannada Rajyothsava award.

== Personal life ==
He was married and had three daughters.
