= 2016 Pathankot attack =

Terrorist attack in India

- Location: 32°14′01″N 75°38′04″E; Pathankot AFS, Punjab, India
- Date: 2–5 January 2016; Began at 03:30 (IST)
- Target: Indian Air Force
- Attack type: Suicide mission
- Weapons: AK-47, Grenades, Grenade launchers, Mortars, IED
- Deaths: 14 (1 civilian, 7 soldiers, and 6 terrorist); 1 civilian and 7 security personnel (5 Defence Security Corps personnel; 1 IAF Garud commando; 1 National Security Guard)
- Injuries: 25
- Victims: One civilian; 7 soldiers defending the base
- Perpetrators: United Jihad Council (claimed); Jaish-e-Mohammed (suspected)
- No. of participants: 4
- Defenders: Indian Army Defence Security Corps; Indian Air Force; National Security Guard; Indian Air Force Garud Commando Force

Pathankot Air Force Station shown in the map of Punjab near the Pakistani border, along with Dina Nagar and state capital Chandigarh.

On 2 January 2016, four militants belonging to the United Jihad Council attacked the Indian Air Force's Pathankot Airbase, part of its Western Air Command.

Four militants and two security forces personnel were killed in the initial battle, with an additional security force member dying from injuries hours later. The gun battle and the subsequent combing operation lasted about 17 hours on 2 January, resulting in five militants and three security personnel dead. Three other soldiers died after being admitted to hospital with injuries, raising the death toll to six soldiers. On 3 January, fresh gunshots were heard, and another security officer was killed by an IED explosion. The operation continued on 4 January, and a fifth militant was confirmed killed. Not until a final militant were reported killed on 5 January was the anti-militant operation declared over although further searches continued for some time.

The attack received wide international condemnation. Though the United Jihad Council, a Kashmir-based militant group, claimed responsibility for the attack on 4 January, the attackers, who were wearing Indian Army fatigues, were subsequently suspected to belong to Pakistan-based Jaish-e-Mohammed, a group designated a terrorist organisation by India, the US, the UK and the UN.

The attack led to a breakdown in India-Pakistan relations, which remained largely unresolved till date. Media reports suggested that the attack was an attempt to derail a fragile peace process meant to stabilise the deteriorated relations between India and Pakistan, as several pieces of evidence were found linking the attackers to Pakistan.

Shahid Latif, a senior Jaish-e-Mohammed commander and mastermind of the attack was assassinated by unknown gunmen on October 10, 2023. Latif, along with his brother and bodyguards, were targeted at dawn in a mosque in Daska, Pakistan.

== Background ==
On the night of 31 December 2015, at 9 pm, four men who had crossed the international border from Pakistan and reached the Indian side, stopped a taxi driver, Ikagar Singh, on the road. There was an attempt to hijack his car but he fought back leading to the hijackers killing him by slitting his throat. The tyres of the hijacked car burst after covering some distance. The armed men then proceeded to hijack a multi-utility vehicle belonging to Salwinder Singh, a superintendent of the Punjab Police, in Dinanagar. In the process, they slit the throat of jeweller Rajesh Kumar, who was later admitted to a hospital. The vehicle was found abandoned about 500 metres away from the airbase. Later, the carjacking was reportedly linked to the attack; the carjackers did not recognise it as a police car since its lights were turned off.

The Punjab Police Department refused to believe the abduction report provided by SP Salwinder Singh after he was released by the attackers, and the other survivor, Madan Gopal, was tortured by the police interrogators upon reporting the incident. Salwinder Singh had a chequered past, and his claims may have been dismissed due to his perceived unreliability. A hand-held walkie talkie, was left behind by the attackers in the hijacked vehicle. It is speculated that its purpose was to aid coordination between that group and the others already at the airport and that the loss delayed the attack by twenty four hours.

== The attack ==
On the morning of 1 January 2016 at around 03:30 IST, at least six heavily armed people dressed in Indian Army uniforms breached the high-security perimeter of the airbase in Pathankot. The infiltrators possibly hid, using the elephant grass in the perimeter of the campus before making the strike. A nylon rope found over the 3.4-metre-high (11-foot) perimeter wall, looped from the ground up and then down again seemed to indicate the mode of entry. It is speculated that one of the attackers had climbed up one of the eucalyptus trees growing alongside the fence: bent it over with his weight to land on the wall. The floodlights in that stretch of the wall were apparently not working that night, which facilitated the transfer of six attackers, with some 50 kilograms (110 pounds) of ammunition, 30 kg (70 lb) of grenades, and assault weapons. Reports arose of someone inside the base assisting the infiltration by changing the angle of floodlights near the wall where the attackers entered.

They entered the living quarters of the base, but were prevented from entering the area where "high-value assets" are parked. A senior police officer said the infiltrators "seemed to have jumped the wall and entered the base." The attackers were able to move 400 metres into the base through a forested area, before they were stopped by Garud commandos, about 700 metres away from the IAF aircraft. The attackers were carrying grenade launchers, 52 mm mortars, AK rifles and a GPS device.

On 2 January, four attackers and 2 security forces personnel were killed in the initial gun battle, with another security personnel dying from injuries hours later. Fresh gunshots were heard in the subsequent combing operation indicating more attackers still at large. Three additional security personnel who were admitted to a hospital with severe injuries after an IED blast during combing operations died on the night of 2 January 2016. Among those killed on 2 January was Commonwealth shooting medalist Subedar Fateh Singh of the Dogra Regiment who was then with the Defence Security Corps.

The National Highway 44 was sealed off as soon as news of the attack broke. According to Indian intelligence officers, the attackers may have entered India on 31 December 2015 along the banks of the Beas River which cuts across the Pakistani border. The attackers were aiming to destroy the aircraft and helicopters in the base, according to a call interception report.

Gunshots were heard on the morning of 3 January 2016, leading to speculation that more attackers were still in the airbase. A fresh IED explosion on 3 January injured three National Security Guard personnel. A National Security Guard officer who was injured during the blast died in a hospital. Also among those who died in action on 3 January was Corporal Gursewak Singh, SC of the Garud Squadron. (Note: Singh was posthumously honored with the Shaurya Chakra for meritorious action and extraordinary sacrifices in 2017 by the President of India.) Around noon, it was discovered that two attackers were still at large in the airbase. Security forces continued the operation on 4 January with reinforcements being deployed to the location. A fifth attacker was confirmed killed later during the day. The neutralisation of the sixth attacker was reported at 4.15 PM on 5 January The operation launched by the Indian Army to neutralise the attackers was called "Operation Dhangu" or "Dhangu Suraksha", named after the place Dhangu where the base is located.

== Analysis ==
Speculative reports by Times of India claimed that the people who carried out the attack in Pathankot had to be in regular touch with their handlers. Another report suggested that the two phone numbers to which calls were made by the attackers were from Pakistan. However, the dates could not confirm linkage with the live incident

The attackers called a number at 21:12 on 31 December from the phone of taxi driver Ikaagar Singh. Perpetrators also received four phone calls on Ikaagar Singh's number. "On this number, in fact, the terrorist is heard telling the attacker to kill the taxi driver," an official told the Times of India. One of the attackers called up his mother in the middle of attack from the mobile phone of jeweller who is a friend of the Pathankot SP - Rajesh Verma. The call was made at around 08:30, five hours after the attack was launched on the airbase.

Maulana Masood Azhar, chief of Jaish-e-Mohammad (JeM), and his brother Abdul Rauf Asghar, an alleged mastermind of the Indian Airlines Flight IC-814 hijack case, are among four persons identified by Indian intelligence agencies as expected "handlers" behind the attack. The agencies found unreliable evidence that the conspiracy could have hatched near Lahore. Indian defense Minister Manohar Parrikar said there are indications that some of the materials used were made in Pakistan.

The details about potential involvement of these four persons have been agreed by Indian Government to be shared with Pakistan through proper channels, and India has pressed for stern action against them regardless of their active involvement in this current incident, as a condition for any future talks with Pakistan, the talk put on hold till a viable action is done from Pakistan's end, the sources claimed. Christine Fair states that the Pakistan Army has launched the "refurbished" Jaish-E-Mohammad to this attack, not only for the tactical benefit of derailing the nascent peace process between India and Pakistan but also for the larger strategic interests domestically and regionally. It was a way to draw back the defected groups of JeM who had turned against the Pakistani government after President Musharraf's U-turn in 2001 and direct them against India.

Questions were raised about the lack of clear command structure within the security forces, the long duration of the attack, high casualties, lack of co-ordination between various units and premature statements claiming the end of the attack in spite of receiving accurate intelligence about the attack. Vikram Sood, the former head of India's foreign intelligence agency Research and Analysis Wing (RAW), wrote an article on Rediff.com citing examples of how terrorist attacks occurred in India soon after peace talks took place between India and Pakistan. Firstpost published an article on similar lines highlighting past attacks and how they adversely affected India–Pakistan relations. Research conducted by GreatGameIndia Magazine revealed that the Pathankot attack was related to the international drug mafia stretching from Afghanistan via Pakistan to India from where the drugs are shipped off to Dubai and Europe.

== Aftermath ==
After the attack, the nation's capital New Delhi was put on high alert. Delhi Police Special Cell received information that two people from a designated terrorist group based in Kashmir known as Jaish-e-Mohammed had entered the city. Security was tightened across the city, and additional security personnel were added in view of Republic Day Parade to be held on 26 January. New Delhi–Lucknow Swarna Shatabdi Express, which left from Delhi, was stopped and checked thoroughly after a bomb threat on 2 January. In another instance at the Mumbai airport, a Turkish Airlines plane was ordered to return from the runway to the parking area after an unclaimed mobile phone was found on a seat. New boarding passes were distributed, and passengers had to undergo a full security check a second time before boarding the plane again, causing a delay of four hours. The flight landed safely in Istanbul. Mumbai, the financial capital of the country, and Hindon Air Force Station, located on the outskirts of Delhi, were also put on high alert. The Western Air Command of the Indian Air Force issued shoot-on-sight orders to all its bases in the wake of the attack.

Following the attacks, the Indian and Pakistani governments both agreed to postpone scheduled diplomatic talks. Pakistani authorities reportedly arrested several members of Jaish-e-Muhammad, though not Masood Azhar, who was placed in protective detention. It was reported that Azhar's exact location was being kept secret to prevent any attempts by his followers to free him.

Indian officials agreed a special team from Pakistan could travel to India to assist with the investigation. A five-member Pakistani investigation team was allowed to visit the air base on 28 March, and remained for three days to collect evidence and conduct interviews with witnesses and survivors. Pakistani investigators stated the attack had been a false-flag attack staged by the Indian government to malign Pakistan.

On 26 April, India and Pakistan resumed their long-postponed diplomatic talks in New Delhi, at which the Indian foreign secretary re-emphasised the need for concrete progress into both the Pathankot and Mumbai attack investigations; Pakistan responded with a statement mentioning it had discussed "all outstanding issues" during the talks. On 3 May, the Standing Committee of the Ministry of Home Affairs, which had sent a delegation to Pathankot to investigate the attack, lambasted the central government for its poor state of preparedness and lack of effective communications between its intelligence agencies. The committee found that despite several advance warnings before the attack, no effective measures had been taken to act upon the intelligence.

On 26 June, it was reported that Pakistan "would consider" allowing an Indian investigation team to visit Pakistan to assist with investigations. In August, Sushma Swaraj, the Indian Minister of External Affairs, categorically ruled out any prospects of further dialogue with Pakistan until it had taken steps on "the Pathankot terror attack," as "terror and talks cannot go hand-in-hand."

== Reactions ==
=== India ===
President Pranab Mukherjee condemned the attack and sent condolences to the families of soldiers who lost their lives. He also sent compliments to soldiers for their valour and courage while fighting the militants.

Prime Minister Narendra Modi also condemned the attack, saying, "Today, enemies of humanity who can't see India progress tried to strike at our strategic area, a prominent airbase at Pathankot. I appreciate our armed forces and thank them for foiling our enemy's attempt."

Minister of Home Affairs Rajnath Singh said, "Pakistan is our neighbouring country. We want good relations with not just Pakistan but with all our neighbours. We also want peace, but if there is any terror attack on India, we will give a befitting reply."

The attack was seen as an attempt to undermine the India-Pakistan peace process. Almost all major Indian newspapers published editorials advising the Indian government to "stay the course" and not serve the purpose of the attackers by stalling or suspending the peace dialogue with Pakistan.

On 14 January, several activists from the Hindu Sena, a right-wing Hindu nationalist group, vandalised the Delhi offices of Pakistan International Airlines. Shouting anti-Pakistani slogans, the activists reportedly damaged computers and furniture. At least one of the activists was arrested by police.

A parliamentary panel report tabled in parliament on 3 May declared that security cover at the airbase was not robust. It mentioned that the perimeter wall was poorly guarded and the base did not have a road around it for patrolling.

=== Pakistan ===
The Pakistan Ministry of Foreign Affairs issued a press release condemning the attack and offered condolences. FO spokesman Qazi Khalilullah said. "Building on the goodwill created during the recent high-level contacts between the two countries, Pakistan remains committed to partner with India as well as other countries in the region to completely eradicate the menace of terrorism afflicting our region." Pakistan also complained that India accused the Pakistani state of the attack. Special assistant to Prime Minister Nawaz Sharif, Irfan Siddiqui, said, "India should understand that Pakistan itself had been one of the greatest victims of terrorist attacks on its soil." He regretted that only after a few terrorist attacks India begins hurling baseless allegations. He advised India to review its stance by further saying, "India should create an environment of trust, as unfounded allegations only hamper the process of dialogue." Former foreign secretary of Pakistan Riaz Khokhar said, "India was trying to tarnish Pakistan's image and is using such attacks to derail talks." Pakistani news channel ARY News reported today that "some arrests" have been made in this regard but police did not confirm any arrest related to the Pathankot attack, as per PTI. "The intelligence agencies have picked up some suspects from Bahawalpur on the leads provided by India in Pathankot airbase attack and shifted them to undisclosed location for interrogation," the news channel reported.

=== Other nations ===
- Islamic Republic of Afghanistan – President Ashraf Ghani condemned the attack and expressed condolences for the deaths of security personnel.
- Bangladesh - Foreign Minister Abul Hassan Mahmud Ali said Bangladesh would stand firmly alongside India in the fight against terrorism.
- Bhutan - Bhutan expressed their solidarity with India and urged the "international community... [to] renew their collective efforts to root out terrorism in all its forms and manifestations."
- Brazil - The Brazilian government said it "manifestly and vehemently repudiates the attack...At the same time, [we] convey sentiments of solidarity to the families of the victims and to the government and people of India. Brazil reiterates its condemnation of any act of terrorism."
- Canada – The Canadian government condemned the attack and extended its condolences to the Indian government and the families of the victims. The Canadian High Commissioner to India, Nadir Patel, said, "Canada encourages regional and international collaboration to combat terrorism and disrupt terrorist networks."
- China – Foreign Ministry spokesperson Hua Chunying condemned the attack and told a media briefing in Beijing, "At this juncture, this attack might have been launched intentionally to disrupt this momentum [in Indo-Pak ties]. Many media reports have such doubts...,".
- France – The French government condemned the attack and expressed condolences to the victims' families and to the Indian government. The French Ministry of Foreign Affairs stated, "We address our condolences to the families of the victims and to the Indian government. France stands alongside India in the struggle against terrorism."
- Germany – The German government condemned the attack, as well as an attack on the Indian consulate-general in Mazar-e-Sharif, Afghanistan, stating, "The responsible parties must be identified and held accountable." In a statement, the Federal Foreign Office welcomed the dialogue which had recently been re-established between the prime ministers of India and Pakistan, and said they were "a good start and an important step towards improving relations between India and Pakistan in a lasting way. The attacks and other attempts to sabotage the dialogue must not be allowed to endanger the rapprochement."
- Italy – Foreign Minister Paolo Gentiloni condoled the deaths of security personnel and affirmed Italy's solidarity with the Indian people.
- Japan – The Japanese government condemned the attack and expressed its solidarity "with the government and people of India."
- Maldives – The Maldivian government strongly condemned the attack and extended "profound sympathy" to the Indian government and people. "Terrorism, in all its forms and manifestations, is a threat to peace, prosperity, democracy, and humanity, and needs to be defeated. The cowardly attack that took place in Pathankot will only strengthen our resolve to remain steadfast in our collective efforts to bring an end to this global scourge forever," a government statement said.
- Nepal – On his behalf and on that of the Nepalese government, Prime Minister Khadga Prasad Sharma Oli sent a condolence message to Indian Prime Minister Narendra Modi, extending condolences and sympathies to Prime Minister Modi and to the bereaved families. Wishing for the swift recovery of those wounded in the attack, he reiterated the Nepalese government's unequivocal condemnation of terrorism "in all its forms and manifestations, and holds the view that terrorism must be firmly and resolutely dealt with wherever and whenever it takes place." He expressed his belief that the perpetrators would shortly be brought to justice.
- South Africa – The South African government condemned the attack and expressed its condolences to the victims' families. The government urged the continuation of dialogue between India and Pakistan, "Momentum has recently been built in efforts to enhance stability in the region through dialogue and cooperation, and all parties are urged not to allow this event to interrupt or derail the dialogue process and the goodwill created through recent high level talks. South Africa, given its history, strongly believes that there is no alternative to dialogue and talks in order to ensure that disputes are resolved peacefully."
- South Korea – The South Korean government condemned the attack, stating, "Terrorism is a crime against humanity, and [an] inhuman act that cannot be justified in any circumstances."
- Sri Lanka – The Sri Lankan government strongly condemned the attack and expressed its condolences. "Sri Lanka remains committed to work with countries in the region and beyond to combat terrorism in all its forms and manifestations," a government statement said.
- United Kingdom – Dr. Alexander Evans, Britain's acting High Commissioner to India, condemned the attack, saying, "The UK strongly condemns the terrorist attack in Pathankot and offers condolences to the victims and their families. We are committed to working with India and other countries around the world to combat terrorism and bring the perpetrators of terrible crimes like these to justice."
- United States – President Barack Obama strongly condemned the attack, stating, "We join India in condemning the attack, saluting the Indians who fought to prevent more loss of life and extending our condolences to the victims and their families. Tragedies like this also underscore why the US and India continue to be such close partners in fighting terrorism." Accepting the attack originated on Pakistani territory, Mr. Obama added, "Pakistan has an opportunity to show that it is serious about legitimizing, disrupting and dismantling terrorist networks. In the region and around the world, there must be zero tolerance for safe havens and terrorists must be brought to justice." He described the Pathankot attack as "another example of the inexcusable terrorism that India has endured for too long," and credited Prime Minister Narendra Modi for reaching out to his Pakistani counterpart Nawaz Sharif after the attack. State Department spokesperson John Kirby said, "The United States is committed to our strong partnership with India to combat terrorism" and urged "all countries in the region to work together to disrupt and dismantle terrorist networks and to bring to justice the perpetrators of this heinous act." The United States government is also keen that the attack does not disrupt the renewed talks between India and Pakistan. Kirby also expected that Pakistan will take actions against the perpetrators of the terror attack. He said, "The government of Pakistan has spoken very powerfully to this and it's certainly our expectation that they'll treat this exactly the way they've said they would." John Kerry, US Secretary of State, requested Pakistan Prime Minister to continue the discussion with India, saying that this attack must not affect dialogue between the two countries.

== Documentary ==
- Special Operations India: 'Pathankot', presented by History TV18 channel.

== See also ==
- List of terrorist incidents, January–June 2016
- 2016 Uri attack
