= Fateh Singh (shooter) =

Indian sport shooter and military personnel

Subedar (Honorary Captain) Fateh Singh was an Indian Army JCO from the 15th Battalion of the Dogra Regiment and sport shooter. He won gold and silver medal in the big bore individual and team events in the Commonwealth Shooting Championships in 1995 in New Delhi. He was on duty as part of the Defence Security Corps and killed in action during the 2016 Pathankot attack.
