= Jyoti Prakash Nirala =

Ashoka Chakra recipient

Corporal Jyoti Prakash Nirala AC
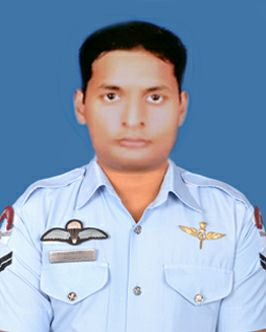
- Born: 15 November 1986; Rohtas district, Bihar
- Died: 18 November 2017 (aged 31); Bandipora district, Jammu and Kashmir
- Military career
- Allegiance: India
- Branch: Indian Air Force
- Service years: 2005–2017
- Rank: Corporal
- Service number: 918203
- Units: Rashtriya Rifles (deputed); Garud Commando Force
- Awards: Ashok Chakra

Corporal Jyoti Prakash Nirala, AC (15 November 1986 – 18 November 2017) was a member of the Garud Commando Force. He was posthumously awarded the Ashoka Chakra, India's highest peacetime military decoration in January 2018. He is the first airman to receive the award for ground combat and only the third one to receive it overall after Suhas Biswas and Rakesh Sharma.

== Early and personal life ==
Nirala was a resident of the Badiladih village of Rohtas district, Bihar. He was born on 15 November 1986, in Hindu family to Tej Narayan Singh Yadav and Malti Devi.

Jyoti Prakash Nirala was married to Sushma Nand Yadav in 2010 and they have a daughter Jigyasa Kumari.

== Military service ==
Nirala joined the Garud Commando Force of the Indian Air Force in 2005. His unit was deputed to the 13 Rashtriya Rifles and stationed in Jammu and Kashmir under Operation Rakshak.

== Ashok Chakra ==
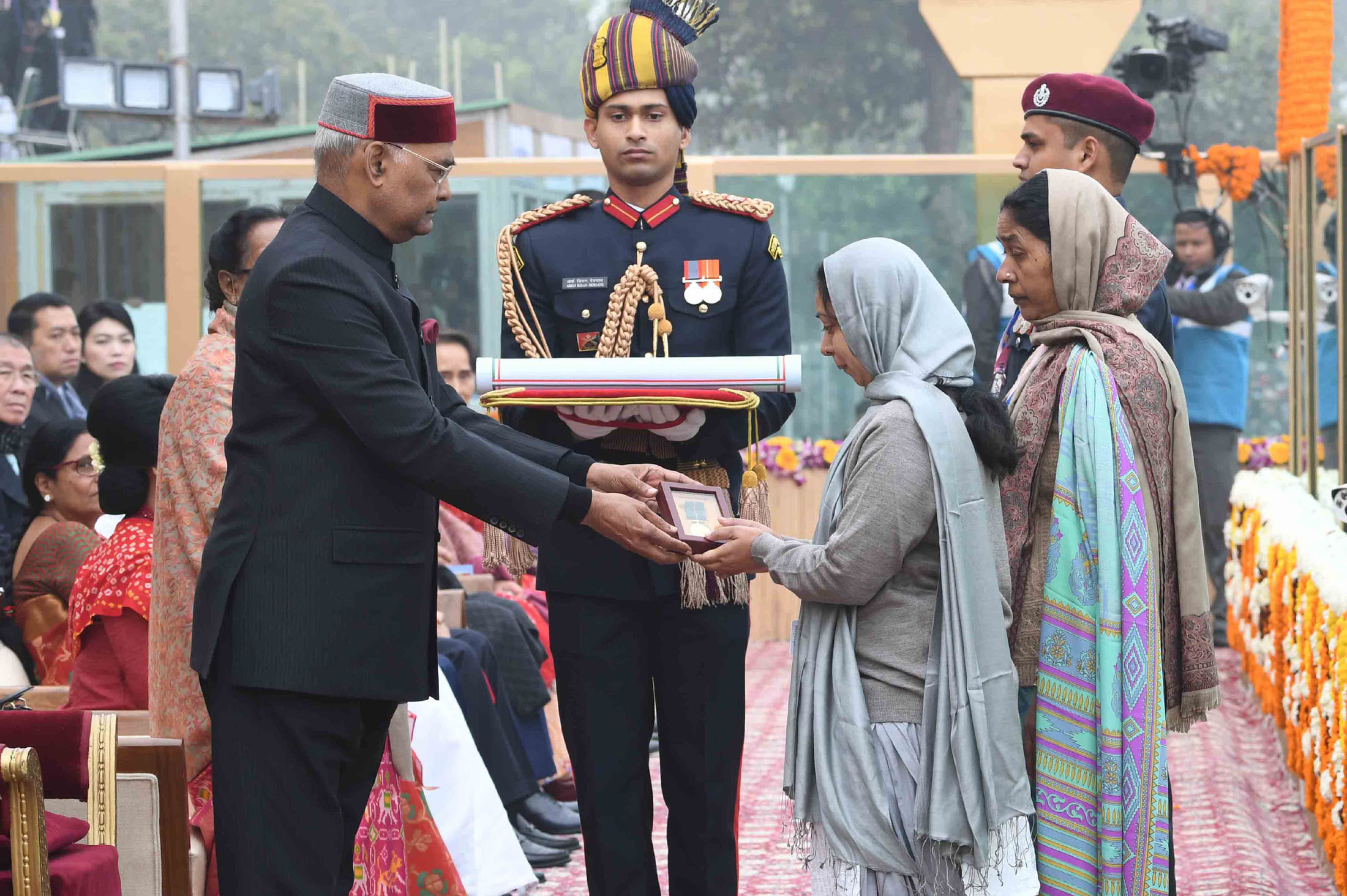
Jyoti Prakash Nirala's widow and mother receive the Ashok Chakra from president Ram Nath Kovind on 26 January 2018.

A joint offensive was launched by the Garud detachment and the 13 Rashtriya Rifles in Chanderger village, Bandipora district, Jammu and Kashmir based on technical intelligence. His detachment covertly approached the house that had suspected militants hiding in it and laid a close quarter ambush. Nirala, armed with a light machine gun, positioned himself close to the approach of the hideout, cutting off all escape routes.

In a bid to escape, the six militants rushed out, shooting and throwing grenades. He retaliated and shot down two category ‘A’ militants and injured two others. In the exchange, he was hit by a volley of small arms fire and kept firing despite being critically injured. Nirala subsequently succumbed to the fatal injuries received during the encounter in which all six militants were killed.

He was awarded the Ashok Chakra on 26 January 2018 for service and exhibiting bravery in fighting the militants. He is credited with eliminating the local leadership of Lakshar-e-Taiba. One of the militants killed during the operation was the nephew of Lashkar-e-Taiba commander Zaki-ur-Rehman Lakhvi, a major planner of the 2008 Mumbai attacks.
