= 2016 Pampore attack =

Mass shooting in Jammu and Kashmir, India

- Part of Insurgency in Jammu and Kashmir
- Location: Pampore, Jammu and Kashmir, India
- Date: 25 June 2016; 4:40 pm (IST)
- Attack type: Mass shooting
- Weapon: AK-47, grenades
- Deaths: 8 officers, 2 perpetrators
- Injuries: 22
- Perpetrator: Lashkar-e-Taiba
- Defender: Central Reserve Police Force

The 2016 Pampore attack was an attack by militants of the Jihadist group, Lashkar-e-Taiba on 25 June 2016, near Frestabal area of Pampore on Srinagar-Jammu National Highway in Jammu and Kashmir.

== Attack ==
At around 16:40 on 25 June 2016, a Central Reserve Police Force convoy, consisting of six vehicles, was ambushed by three or four militants while en route from Pantha Chowk to Pampore. The convoy came under attack as it was slowing down at a bend in the highway in order to make a turn. Carrying AK-47s and grenades, the militants attacked a bus carrying over 40 CRPF officers, killing eight officers and injuring over 20 others, several critically. In the ensuing gun battle, two of the militants were killed. It was reported that one or two militants might have escaped.

== Investigation ==
Senior CRPF commanders who investigated the attack and examined the corpses of the two killed militants said the dead militants had shaved their bodies, a characteristic of fidayeen attackers. As the militants had 11 AK-47 magazines with them, they had clearly prepared for intensive fighting. According to CRPF officers, unexploded grenades recovered from the scene appeared similar to those used by the Pakistan Army. Investigators believed the militants had possibly infiltrated the area up to 10 days ago, possibly with assistance from other terrorist units or from locals.

== Responsibility ==
The terrorist group Lashkar-e-Taiba subsequently claimed responsibility, with a spokesman threatening more attacks in the future.

== Reactions ==
Chief Minister of Jammu and Kashmir Mehbooba Mufti condemned the attack, saying, “The elements inimical to interests of J&K have always tried to derail the peace efforts and the latest militant strike at Pampore is again aimed at subverting the peace and development initiatives launched by the government."

Home Minister Rajnath Singh condemned the attack, “An attempt is being made by these terrorists and our neighbouring country to destabilise India. I want to praise the bravery of our security men. I salute their courage. Terrorists attacked them deceitfully. But our security men killed those two terrorists successfully.”
