= Jisha murder case =

2016 case in Kerala, India

The Jisha murder case (Crime No.909/2016) was a murder trial conducted by the Ernakulam Sessions court and Kerala High Court during the years 2016 - present. The case was filed on basis of a FIS and FIR filed by Kuruppambady Police station. The FIR stated that a body of 30 year old law student, Jisha, was found in her house near Periyarvalley canal in Perumbavoor, Ernakulam. The case gained significant momentum as a result of protests from her classmates in Government Law College, Ernakulam. The accused Ameer-ul-Islam was arrested by the Kerala Police raising questions on the authenticity of the arrest. The accuse was charged for murder and rape under IPC by the Ernakulam Session court on 12 December 2017 and was sentenced to life imprisonment. The sentence was reformed by Kerala High Court to capital punishment on 20 May 2024, becoming the first case to receive capital punishment in Kerala after the infamous Ripper Chandran case. This sparked several controversies and led way to new laws in the nation regarding woman safety.

== Murder ==
The FIR filed on 29th April 2016 at Kuruppambady Police Station stated that, Jisha, a 30 year old law student was found dead at her residence near Periyarvallley canal in Perumbavoor, Ernakulam. The body was found by the deceased's mother and neighbours who rushed to her home after hearing the screams from the mother. The front door of the house was locked from inside. The sub inspector, who was on patrol duty, entered through the back door which was found ajar. The body lied inside the middle room half naked and bleeding heavily. Multiple stab wounds were present in the body and it was disembowed. The police gathered evidences from the scene. The body was sent to postmortem and later concluded that the death is likely to have occurred between 12 noon and 9 pm on 28 April. The body was found to have 38 wounds in postmortem. The deceased was likely to be raped and suffered injuries during struggles against these attempts. The body also showed signs of strangulation. The cause of death was determined as combined effects of strangulation, smothering and bleeding. Based on the report, the postmortem doctor, Dr. Liza John, confirmed the evidences of a sexual assault. No details about crime scene were given in brief

== Arrest and trial ==
=== Arrest ===
The case was filed under the Judicial First Class Magistrate, Kuruppambady. The investigating officer filed the case under various sections of Indian Penal Code and stated that the accused had committed offence punishable under the Scheduled Caste and Scheduled Tribe (Prevention of Atrocities) Act, 1989. After nearly two months, a 22-year-old migrant laborer, Ameer-ul-Islam, was arrested by the Kerala Police on 16th June at Kancheepuram, Tamil Nadu. The report was filed before the First Class Magistrate, Kuruppambady indicating Ameer-ul-Islam as the accused. Ameer was a migrant laborer and lived near Perumbavoor. He was accused to know that the victim was alone in their residence and that he barged into the residence with arms and intention to rape her. Prosecution alleged that the victim, who resisted the attempt, was brutally stabbed by the accused due to frustration, that one of the injuries included a grievous penetrating injury deep inside her genitals by repeated stabbing of her vagina in such a manner that it caused a small portion of her internal organs came out of the body. It was alleged that the accused left through the back door, walked towards the canal and throwing away the knife. It was also alleged that the accused, after the alleged incident, escaped to his home in Assam by catching a train from Aluva Railway Station.

=== Trial ===
The accused was presented before the court and framed charges against him for the offences punishable under Sections 449 (trespassing), 342 (wrongful confinement), 376, 376A (rape and murder), 302 (murder) and 201 (destruction of evidence) IPC and Sections 3(1)(a), 3(1)(w)(i) & (ii) and 3(2)(v) of the Scheduled Castes and Scheduled Tribes (Prevention of Atrocities) Act, 1989. Advocate N K Unnikrishnan, Senior lawyer from thrissur appeared as Special Prosecutor. Advocate Biju Antony Aloor, commonly called Aloor appeared as defence lawyer for the accused. The accused denied the allegations and pled not guilty. After examining 100 witnesses, 291 material evidences were taken into consideration by the Court. After a prolonged trial, the court found the accused not guilty for acts against sections 201 IPC and Sections 3(1)(a), 3(1)(w)(i) & (ii) and 3(2)(v) of the Scheduled Castes and Scheduled Tribes (Prevention of Atrocities) Act, 1989. However, he was proved guilty for offences under Sections 449, 342, 376A and 302 and was convicted murderer under special charges and was sentenced for death, among other penalties.

== Case impact ==
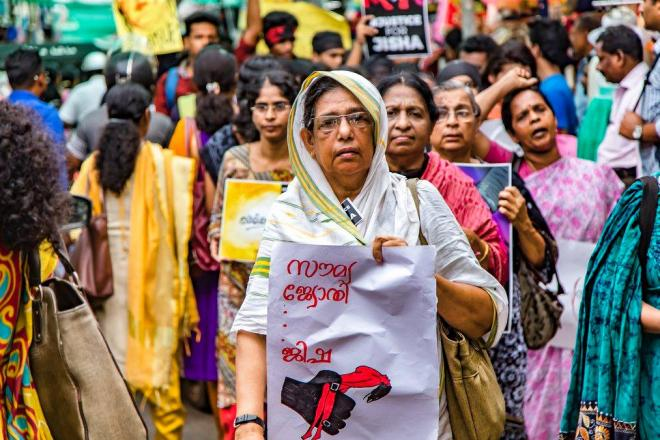
Protest march after Jisha murder

The crime took place in the backdrop of the Kerala Legislative elections, and hence gained momentum and focus from political parties. As a woman brutally murdered in her home in Perumbavoor, Justice for Jisha was the hashtag (#JusticeForJisha) used in the social media during April 2016 to quicken efforts for justice to Jisha by politicians and largely by people. The film industry also joined forces in demanding justice for Jisha. The government has declared to offer a financial consolation of Rs 10 lakh to the family of Jisha and a home will be provided for her parents. Also many artists and humanitarians pledged support to the case. This later led to various controversies.

== Controversies ==
The accused's arrest in June led to various controversies regarding the authenticity of arrest. At the time of arrest, the accused looked malnourished. He was 22 years old and was physically weak. It was alleged that a person of such physical characteristics would not be able to hold a 30 year old, fully healthy woman as captive. The police found a pair of 9-inch slippers near the canal and was accused to be Ameer's. But Ameer's footsize was 7-inches.

It is also alleged that Jisha's mother, Rajeshwari, used to work for P. P. Thankachan and had a sexual relationship with Thankachan and Rajeshwari conceived Jisha as a result of this relationship. But both of them denied the claims. Neighbours of Jisha, alleged that on the night of the incident, Rajeshwari repeatedly told "I knew he would do it. He told me he would do it" suggesting that Rajeshwari knew who was the killer. But later, Rajeshwari denied the claims too. Rajeshwari, who received significant amount in compensation through crowd funding, was many times found to gamble the money she received, raising doubts on what relationship she had with her daughter.

As Ameer-ul-Islam was a migrant labour, his period of court trial was challenging. He said that he doesn't know why he is arrested and police was fabricating the evidence. His lack of knowledge in Malayalam resulted in a significant backlash. This also raised issues against moral and ethical rights of an Indian citizen.
