= 2016 Baramulla attack =

2016 militant attack in Baramulla, Jammu and Kashmir, India

- 2016 Baramulla attack (Jammu and Kashmir) 2016 Baramulla attack (India) Location in Jammu and Kashmir, India
- Location: Indian Army camp in Baramulla district of Jammu and Kashmir state
- Date: 2 October 2016-3 October 2016; 10:30 PM IST(5 PM UTC)
- Target: 46 Rashtriya Rifles
- Attack type: Terrorism
- Deaths: 5 (3 soldiers, 2 attackers)
- Injuries: 2 soldiers
- Defender: Indian Army

On the midnight of the second and third of October 2016, militants attacked a camp of the Indian Army's 46 Rashtriya Rifles in the Baramulla district of Jammu and Kashmir, India.

The attack was said to have begun at 10:30 PM local time, with at least one officer of the Indian Border Security Force (BSF) killed and a number injured. Two militants were also reportedly killed. The attack came within weeks after militants attacked an Indian Army installation in Baramulla district's Uri area.

According to India Today, the attackers were Handeef alias Hilal, 23, and Ali, 22, Pakistani nationals belonging to Masood Azhar's Jaish-e-Mohammad (JeM) militant organization .

On 6 October, the Indian army exchanged fire with militants Kupwara district, and 3 militants were killed.

== See also ==
- 2016 Uri attack
