= Ganesh Joshi =

Indian politician (born 1958)

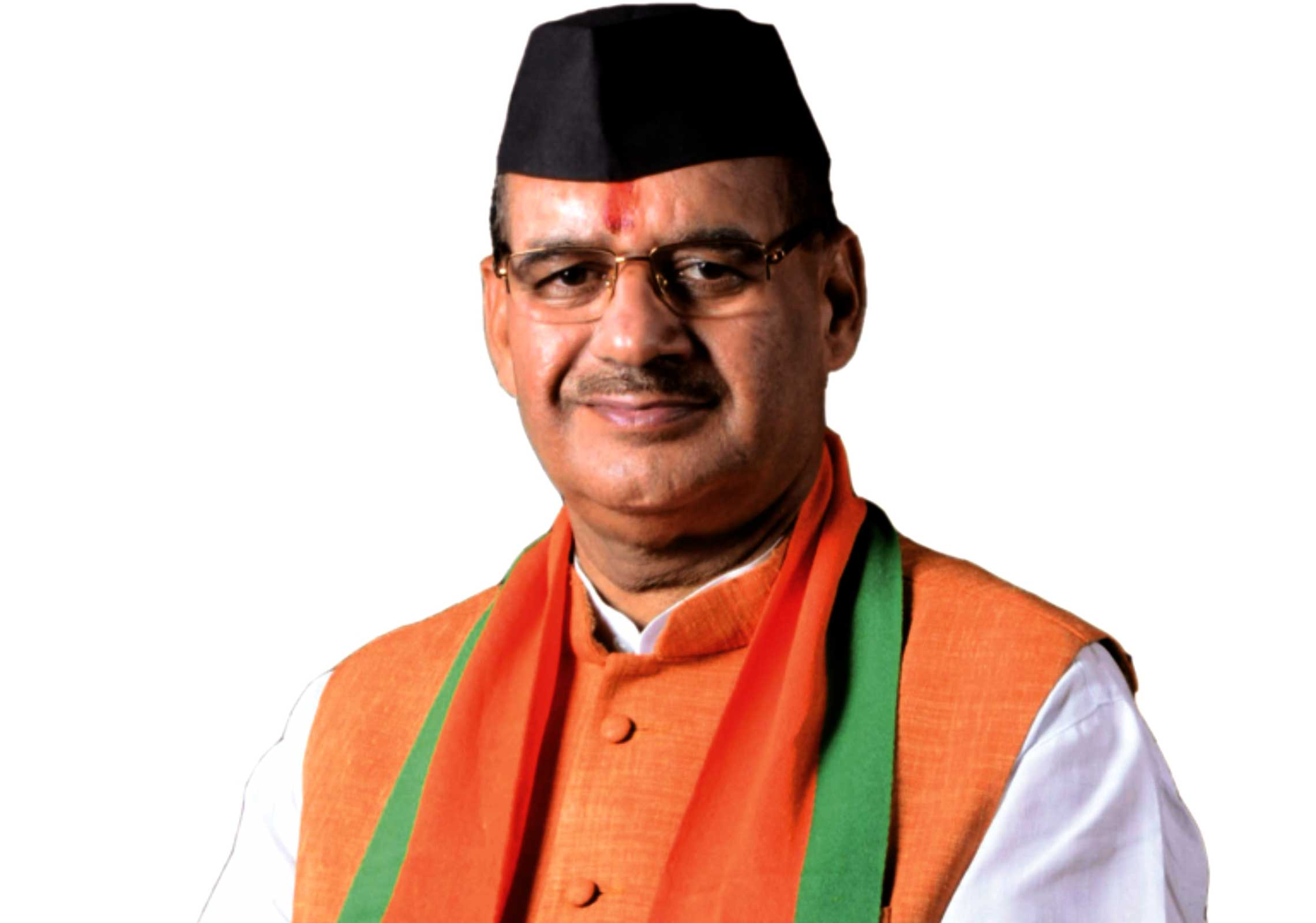
Ganesh Joshi Mussoorie MLA

Ganesh Joshi is an Indian politician and currently, a State Cabinet Minister of Government of Uttarakhand under the Chief Minister Pushkar Singh Dhami. He is a member of the Bharatiya Janata Party. Joshi is a 4th time member of the Uttarakhand Legislative Assembly from the Mussoorie constituency in Dehradun district.

Originally from Pithoragarh district in Uttarakhand, Ganesh Joshi was born in Meerut City in 1958 where his father, Late Shri Shyam Dutt Joshi was posted as a jawan of the Indian Army. He could complete formal education only till class 10th. Second eldest among five siblings, his childhood was spent in Meerut, Haridwar and Dehradun. He served in the Indian Army as a soldier from 1976 to 1983.

== Political background ==
Joined Bharatiya Janata Party as a member in 1984 and served different positions as below.

- Secretary, Bharatiya Janta Yuva Morcha, Dehradun City (1985–89)
- Vice President, Bharatiya Janta Yuva Morcha, Dehradun City (1989–92)
- President, Bharatiya Janta Yuva Morcha, Dehradun City (1994–96)
- Mandal prabhari, Bharatiya Janata Yuva Morch, Garhwal Mandal (1996–98)
- Sec. BJP, Dehradun City (1998-2000)
- District Gen. Sec, BJP, Dehradun Mahanagar (2000-2002)
- State General Secretary, Local Bodies cell, Uttaranchal
- Elected 2007 MLA from Rajpur constituency
- Nominated 2009 Chairperson of Housing committee of Uttarakhand Legislative Assembly
- Elected in 2012 MLA from Mussoorie constituency
- Elected in 2017 MLA from Mussoorie constituency
- Elected in 2022 MLA from Mussoorie constituency

== Political activities ==
- In 1991 during Ram Janam Bhoomi Movement injured and arrested by police in lathicharge.
- During Uttarakhand Movement injured in agitation at DIG Campus, Dehradun on 3 October 1994.
- On 16 December 1994 injured and arrested at Police Control Room and was sent to Bareilly Central Jail for 27 days.
- Also participated actively in many other agitations and rallies.
- On 15 February 2017, Sonia Gandhi's son-in-law Robert Vadra criticized the BJP for allowing Joshi to run in the 2017 Assembly election having allegedly thrashed and kicked, Shaktiman, a police horse at a protest in March 2016, injuring its legs which eventually led to its death a month later.

== Controversies ==
In July 2026, a special vigilance court in Dehradun issued notice to Joshi in connection with allegations of possessing assets disproportionate to his known sources of income. The complaint was filed by advocate and Uttarakhand Congress spokesperson Pankaj Singh Kshetri, who alleged that his earlier efforts to have a vigilance investigation registered did not result in FIR because government approval was required for action against a sitting cabinet minister. Kshetri subsequently approached the court under Section 173(3) of the Bharatiya Nagarik Suraksha Sanhita seeking directions for registration of an FIR. On 25 July, the court issued notice to Joshi and directed him to appear on 3 September 2026 to present his response.

In November 2018, Joshi faced criticism after a video showed him distributing ₹100 notes to women during Chhath Puja celebration in his constituency, shortly before the state's civic elections. The Congress party alleged that the incident amounted to a violation of the model code of conduct and described it as an attempt to influence voters, subsequently filing a complaint with the state election commissioner. Joshi denied that the distribution was connected to the elections, stating that he was giving money to only women who applied tika to his forehead and characterizing the practice as a traditional gesture between brothers and sisters. He said the allegations were politically motivated and that he had not received any notice from the election authorities at the time. The state election commissioner said that the matter was being examined. The controversy followed earlier criticism of Joshi, who had attracted national attention in 2016 after being involved in an incident in which a police horse named Shaktimaan was injured and later died.
