= Gunaram Khanikar =

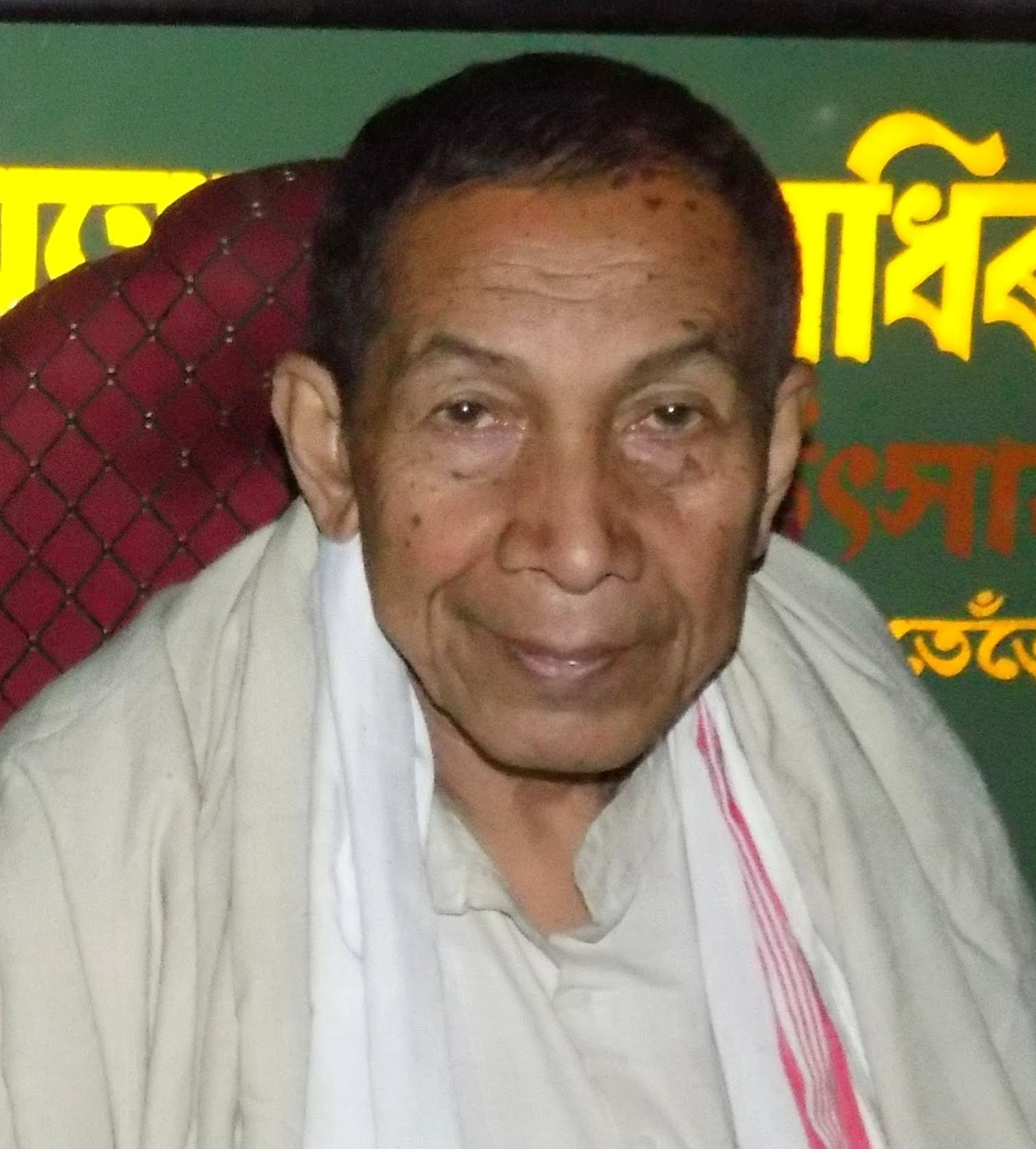
- Gunaram Khanikar
- Born: 22 March 1949; Chakordhora, Golaghat district, Assam, India
- Died: 8 January 2016 (aged 66); Guwahati, Assam, India
- Education: Debraj Roy College, Yameneh Open University
- Occupation: Herbalist
- Known for: Research in Herbal medicine, herbal cure for different diseases
- Awards: Ahmedabad National Innovation Award; Hahnemann Memorial Award; Rashtriya Gaurav Award in 2010; International Gold Star Award in 2010

Gunaram Khanikar was a herbal medicinal expert from Assam, India. Gunaram Khanikar is one of the most popular and recognized names in the field of herbal medicine in India. His birthday, 22 March, is observed as Medicinal Plants day in Assam, India. Khanikar has received numerous awards for his innovation in herbal medicine and around 30 books, most of them in Assamese, including one of the most successful of these, Sahaj Labhya Ban Darober Goon. He has also written around 630 articles for different magazines. Khanikar was also the head of the Regional Research and Training Center on Indian Traditional Treatment (RRTCITT).

Khanikar was conferred with Most Influential Assamese of the Year by a leading satellite news channel of Assam in 2013 and is known to have authored the first Herbal Dictionary.

== Early life and recognition ==
Khanikar was born at Chakardhara village on 22 March 1949. He belonged to a family of Chutia ethnicity. Khanikar developed an interest in herbal medicine when he was a student of Class III. He passed HSLC from Golaghat Government Bezbaruah Higher Secondary School and then graduated in science from Golaghat Debraj Roy College. Instead of pursuing higher studies, he began concentrating on setting up a herbal park in 1970.

Khanikar established the Indian Regional Mutual Treatment and Research Centre and the Gunaram Khanikar Foundation at his residence to take herbal medicine to the general people. He studied the medicinal properties of numerous medical plants. In 2001, Yemaneh Open University conferred on him Masters in Yamanehpathic (MY) with gold medal and Ph.D degrees.

In recognition of Khanikar’s contribution, many organizations have bestowed titles on him such as ‘Manab Mitra’, ‘Bonouxodhi Bigyani’, ‘Bonouxoudhi Raja’, ‘Acharjya’, ‘Bhesaj Ratna’ etc.

His book Xahajlabhya Bon Dorobor Gun is a household name in Assam. Khanikar’s herbal medicines are exported to Thailand, Nepal, China, Canada, Germany, Australia, and Columbia.
