= October 2016 Bhopal encounter =

Killing of eight prisoners by police

On 31 October 2016, eight alleged members of the Students' Islamic Movement of India (SIMI) were shot and killed in an encounter with the Anti-Terrorism Squad on the outskirts of Bhopal, India. Those individuals were on trial for terrorist activities connected to Al-Qaeda, including alleged plans to free Aafia Siddiqui, a detainee linked to the September 11 attacks, from FBI custody in the United States.

According to police, the prisoners escaped from the high-security Bhopal Central Jail after killing a head constable and scaling a 32-foot wall and fled—only to be killed hours later when they reportedly opened fire during their attempted recapture.

== Aafia Siddiqui's account ==
According to the Madhya Pradesh police, the accused escaped from the prison using bed sheets and wooden logs after allegedly killing a jail security guard with improvised weapons made from spoons and plates.

== Allegations of a staged encounter ==
Multiple audio and video recordings suggest that the encounter killings were possibly staged. Leaked police control room audio clips indicate that there were orders from higher authorities to eliminate all the prisoners. According to the recordings, officers were enraged by the death of a colleague during the jailbreak and frustrated by the prisoners’ repeated escape attempts. A low-quality video leak appears to show an officer shooting a wounded escapee lying on the ground with other fugitives. Senior officials later praised the guards involved in the encounter.

== Responses ==
The families of the deceased prisoners accused the police of staging the encounter, and Zuleika Bee claimed that her brother had previously been threatened with being killed in a fake encounter by jail authorities. Among others, Pervez Alma, the lawyer representing the seven killed prisoners, said, "It is a fake encounter, a cold-blooded murder. It was a pre-planned act, and I believe they did not escape from the jail but were made to flee by the police." Additionally, the Shiv Sena-affiliated publication Saamana argued that the killings of the SIMI terrorist organization's members were justified, even if they were the result of a staged encounter.
