= Alexander Evans (diplomat) =

British civil servant, diplomat, and academic

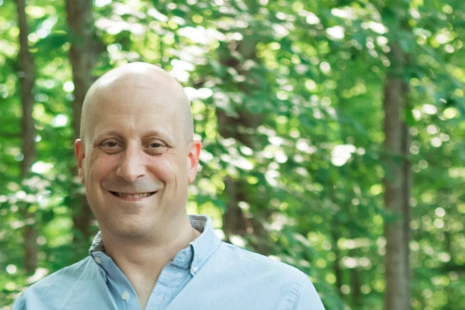
Alexander Evans

Alexander Evans OBE is an academic who has served as a British diplomat. He is Associate Dean of the School of Public Policy and Professor in Practice at the London School of Economics. He is Director of the LSE IDEAS Central and South East Europe Programme and Director of the Ratiu Forum. He primarily teaches and works on international security policy and AI and technology policy.

== Education ==
He has a B.Sc. in International Relations from the London School of Economics, was a World Fellow at Yale University and has a Ph.D. in Politics from the University of London.

== Career ==
A career diplomat, he is a former adviser in 10 Downing Street (2020-2021). He was previously Director Cyber in the Foreign Office (2018-2020), Britain's Deputy High Commissioner to India (2015-2018), and acting British High Commissioner to India from November 2015 to March 2016. He has served with the British High Commission in Pakistan twice, latterly as acting deputy and acting High Commissioner to Pakistan in the early summer of 2021. He has also led the UN Security Council expert group on Al Qaida, Daesh and the Taliban and worked for the first Obama Administration as a senior adviser in the U.S. Department of State.

Alexander has worked extensively on UK government strategy. He was Strategy Director to three successive Cabinet Ministers, Michael Gove, Steve Barclay and Kit Malthouse at the British Cabinet Office (2021-2022). He is a former member of the Foreign Office Policy Planning Staff where he was one of the authors of the UK's foreign policy strategy, Active Diplomacy for a Changing World (2006) and for the then-Prime Minister's later review, Britain in the World (2007).

He is a former Senior Fellow at Yale University, Gwilym Gibbon Fellow at Nuffield College, Oxford and Henry Kissinger Chair in Foreign Policy and International Relations at the Library of Congress. He was a Bernard Schwartz Fellow at the Asia Society in New York. He is a former editorial board member of Asian Affairs and is a former Council Member of the Royal Society for Asian Affairs.

He serves as a Trustee and non-executive director of the Internet Watch Foundation, is a member of the Wilton Park Advisory Council, a Trustee of the International Longevity Centre and serves on the advisory council of the British Library. He is an advisory board member of the Traverse City International Affairs Forum in Michigan, USA and sits on the advisory board of the Ratiu Forum, Romania. In November 2023 he was appointed a Senior Research Fellow at the British Centre for Army Leadership. In December 2024 he was a Visiting Professor at Jawaharlal Nehru University, New Delhi. He has also held visiting appointments at the University of Southern California and the University of Leiden.

== Publications ==
He is a Fellow of the Royal Historical Society and has contributed to books and journals, including in Foreign Affairs, Foreign Policy, the Washington Quarterly, Asian Affairs, Contemporary South Asia, International Affairs, Current History, The World Today and Small Wars and Insurgencies. He is the author of a history of disinterest, a study of informal networks and policymaking, and a range of work on South Asia.
