= 2016 Kokrajhar shooting =

Shooting in India

Kokrajhar Attack 2016
- Location: Balajan Tinali, Assam, India
- Date: 5 August 2016; 10 years ago
- Attack type: Mass shooting
- Weapons: AK-56, AK-47, Grenades
- Deaths: 14
- Injuries: 16
- No. of participants: 6

On 5 August 2016, a group of militants opened fire at a market in Balajan Tiniali, near the town of Kokrajhar in Assam, India. Fourteen people were killed and sixteen were injured as a result of the attack.

== Attack ==
As many as six attackers came to the market in a rickshaw and began shooting at people as well as throwing grenades into the crowd of people. After the attackers finished their attack, five of the six attackers ran away, while one attacker was killed by security forces. After the attackers fled, AK-56 and AK-47 rifles were found at the attack site.

== Response ==
Chief Minister of Assam Sarbananda Sonowal condemned the attack, calling it "cowardly and dastardly". He also offered Rs 5 lakh to the relatives of those who were killed, Rs 1 lakh to the person who was critically injured, and Rs 20,000 to those who received minor injuries.
