= February 2016 Pulwama militant siege =

Terrorist incident in Kashmir, India

A militant siege of Entrepreneurship Development Institute in Pulwama district occurred on 20 February 2016 in Kashmir. It was part of the 2016 Kashmir unrest.

== Events ==
Prior to this incident militants had attacked a Central Reserve Police convoy travelling on the Jammu–Srinagar National Highway, resulting in three police deaths. In a gunfight later, one civilian was killed in gunfire between police and militants, and over a dozen were injured, including police.

After the attack on convoy, militants besieged the Entrepreneurship Development Institute of India. The government personnel were immediately rescued but one employee, a gardener, was killed in the initial gunfight. The fight lasted 48 hours, in which, it was found, three militants were cleverly changing their position in the building, engaging security forces in fierce battle. A special team of Indian forces finally cleared each floor of the building and searched every room for militants, then neutralized all three.

== See also ==
- 2019 Pulwama attack
