= G. A. Vadivelu =

- Born: Gollahalli A. Vadivelu; 12 June 1925; Gollahalli, Dharmapuri district, Tamilnadu
- Died: 13 January 2016 (aged 90); Salem, Tamilnadu

G. A. Vadivelu (12 June 1925 – 13 January 2016) was a freedom fighter and a close associate of Mahatma Gandhi, Jayaprakash Narayan, Rajaji and Kamaraj.

== Early life ==
Vadivelu, born in Gollahalli, Dharmapuri, Tamil Nadu, studied at Dharmapuri High School before he discontinued his studies so he could part in the national freedom struggle. He joined the congress when he was 15 years old and took part in the 1940 Individual Satyagraha and 1942 Quit India Movement and was subsequently imprisoned in the Palayamkottai Jail. He died in a private hospital at Salem, Tamil Nadu because of an illness on 13 January 2016 at the age of 90.

== Late 1940s ==
Though India was freed in 1947, Pondicherry territory was not freed. Vadivelu went to Pondicherry and took part in the freedom struggle. During his tenure in Pondicherry, he ran the journal Samudayam. When Jayaprakash Narayan formed a separate group in Congress to serve the downtrodden, Vadivelu joined Jayaprakash Narayan and became an active member of his socialist group.

== After Independence ==
After the country obtained Independence, Jayaprakash left Congress in 1948 to serve have-nots and formed the socialist party. Vadivelu followed him. Vadivelu fought for the cause of the down-trodden and was imprisoned 17 times in free India. Because of his efforts, around 2,000 landless peasants received forest and revenue lands in Salem, Dharmapuri, and Madurai districts. About 1,800 hut-dwellers of Dharmapuri got house sites in railway lands. Sri Madhu Dantavate, then Railway Minister, mentioned Vadivelu's tireless effort in a conference at Delhi and praised him, stating: "Vadivelu is the only man in whole India who got Railway lands free of cost for the poor". When an emergency was declared in 1975 he was imprisoned for multiple days and paraded in streets. In Chennai, the railway department began the metro line work. If it was continued, nearly 12,000 poor families would have been evicted. Vadivelu struggled for them and compelled the government to change the Railway line which saved the 12,000 families. Leading a clean life, active, and Gandhian, even though he is 86 years old, he is very active and serves the people as usual. He was the state general secretary of the Praja Socialist Party, then President of the Tamil Nadu Janata Dal for eight years, and senior vice president of National Janata Dal for two years. In 2002 he rejoined Congress after 54 years. Now he is a member of AICC and executive member of TNCC and its coordination committee member.

== Writing and Journalism ==
Apart from his political activities, he is a journalist and writer. He was the editor of Janata, Samudhayam and Pudhu vazhvu journals for many years. His articles were published in various journals such as Puratchi, Tamil Nadu, Manjari, Dravida Naidu, Baratha Devi, Sangoli, Malai, Murasu, Theyagi, Dinamani, Dina malar, etc. As a writer, he has authored around 30 books, among which is a historical novel Sembiyar Thilagam (1200 pages). This book was awarded as the best book published in the years 1985 and 1986. He has researched the Tamil Nadu history for many years and enlightened the 300-year dark rule of kalapralas. M Karunanidhi, the former chief minister of Tamil Nadu has appreciated this book.
