= 2016 attacks on India =

Terrorist incidents in India

There have been several attacks on Indian Armed Forces by militants in 2016.

== Pathankot ==
The 2016 Pathankot attack was a terrorist attack committed on 2 January 2016 by a heavily armed group which attacked the Pathankot Air Force Station, part of the Western Air Command of the Indian Air Force.

Four attackers and two security forces personnel were killed in the initial battle, with an additional security force member dying from injuries hours later. The gun battle and the subsequent combing operation lasted about 17 hours on 2 January, resulting in five attackers and 6 security personnel dead. A further three soldiers died after being admitted to hospital with injuries, raising the death toll to 9 soldiers. On 3 January, fresh gunshots were heard, and another security officer was killed by an IED explosion. The operation continued on 4 January, and a fifth attacker was confirmed killed. Not until a final terrorist was reported killed on 5 January was the anti-terrorist operation declared over, though further searches continued for some time.

== Pampore ==
On 22 Feb 2016, Three terrorists were killed after two days of gunbattle in a multi-storey building of the J&K Entrepreneurship Development Institute campus at Sempora, Pampore. Two Army Captains Pawan Kumar 10 PARA (SF) and Tushar Mahajan 9 PARA (SF) and Lance Naik Om Prakash 9 PARA (SF) were killed.

== 2nd Pampore ==
The 2016 Pampore attack was an attack by Lashkar-e-Taiba militants on 25 June 2016, near the town of Pampore in the Indian territory of Jammu and Kashmir. Killing 8 officers and injuring 25 others

== Uri ==
The 2016 Uri attack was an attack by four heavily armed insurgents on 18 September 2016, near the town of Uri in Indian administered Jammu and Kashmir. It was reported as "the deadliest attack on security forces in Kashmir in two decades". 21 Indian soldiers were dead and almost 100 were injured. No group has claimed responsibility for the attack, though the militant group Jaish-e-Mohammed is suspected of being involved in the planning and execution of the attack. At the time of the attack, the Kashmir Valley region was at the centre of unrest, during which 85 civilians were killed and thousands injured in clashes with security forces.

== Baramulla ==
On the midnight of the second and third of October 2016, militants attacked a camp of the Indian Army's 46 Rashtriya Rifles killing 3 soldiers and injuring many in the Baramulla district of Jammu and Kashmir, India

== Handwara ==
On 6 October, the militants attacked Handwara army camp in Jammu and Kashmir.

== Shopian ==
Terrorists attacked a police post in Jamnageri area of the Shopian district in Jammu and Kashmir on 7 October 2016.

== Zakura ==
1 Sashastra Seema Bal member was killed and 8 others were injured by militants while on patrol on the outskirts of Srinagar

== Nagrota ==
The Indian Army base in Nagrota, Jammu and Kashmir was attacked on 29 November 2016 by a group of militants. During the ensuing gun battle, seven Indian soldiers, including two officers and all three militants were killed.
