= Sindaghatta =

Coordinates: 12.698566°N 76.551051°E

Sindhagatta is a village in the Mandya district of Karnataka state, India.

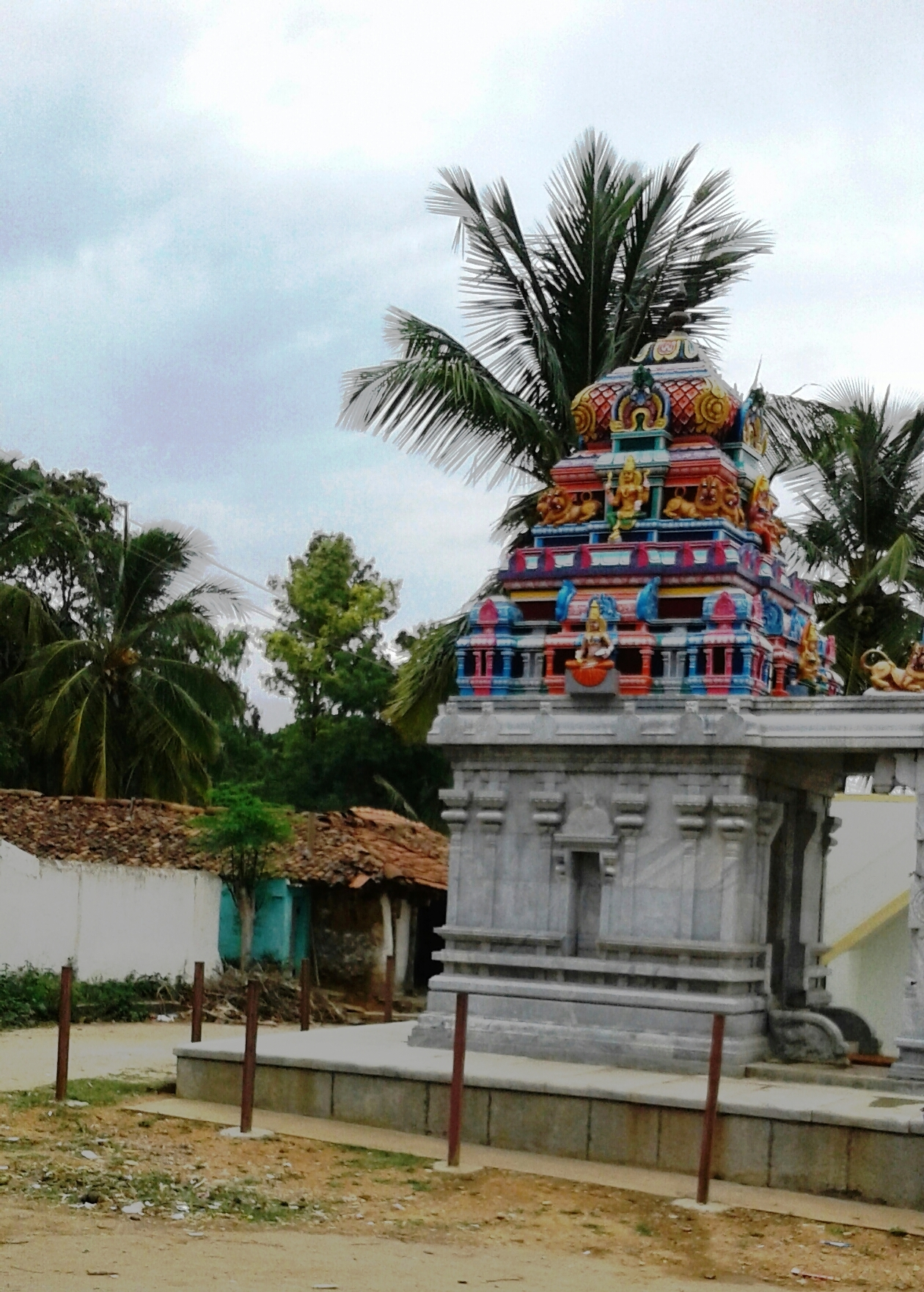
Temple in Sndhagatta

== Location ==
Sindhagatta is located on the road from Krishnarajpet to Melukote.

== PIN code ==
There is a post office in the village and the postal code is 571426.

== Demographics ==
According to the 2011 census of the Government of India, Sindhagatta village has an area of 1,520 hectares. The total population of the village is 3,464 and there are 828 houses in it.

== Constituent suburbs ==
- Chikkanayakanahalli
- Hathimaranahalli
- Kyathanahalli
- Maruvanahalli
- Molenahalli
- Thammadahalli
- Uygonahalli

== Gallery ==
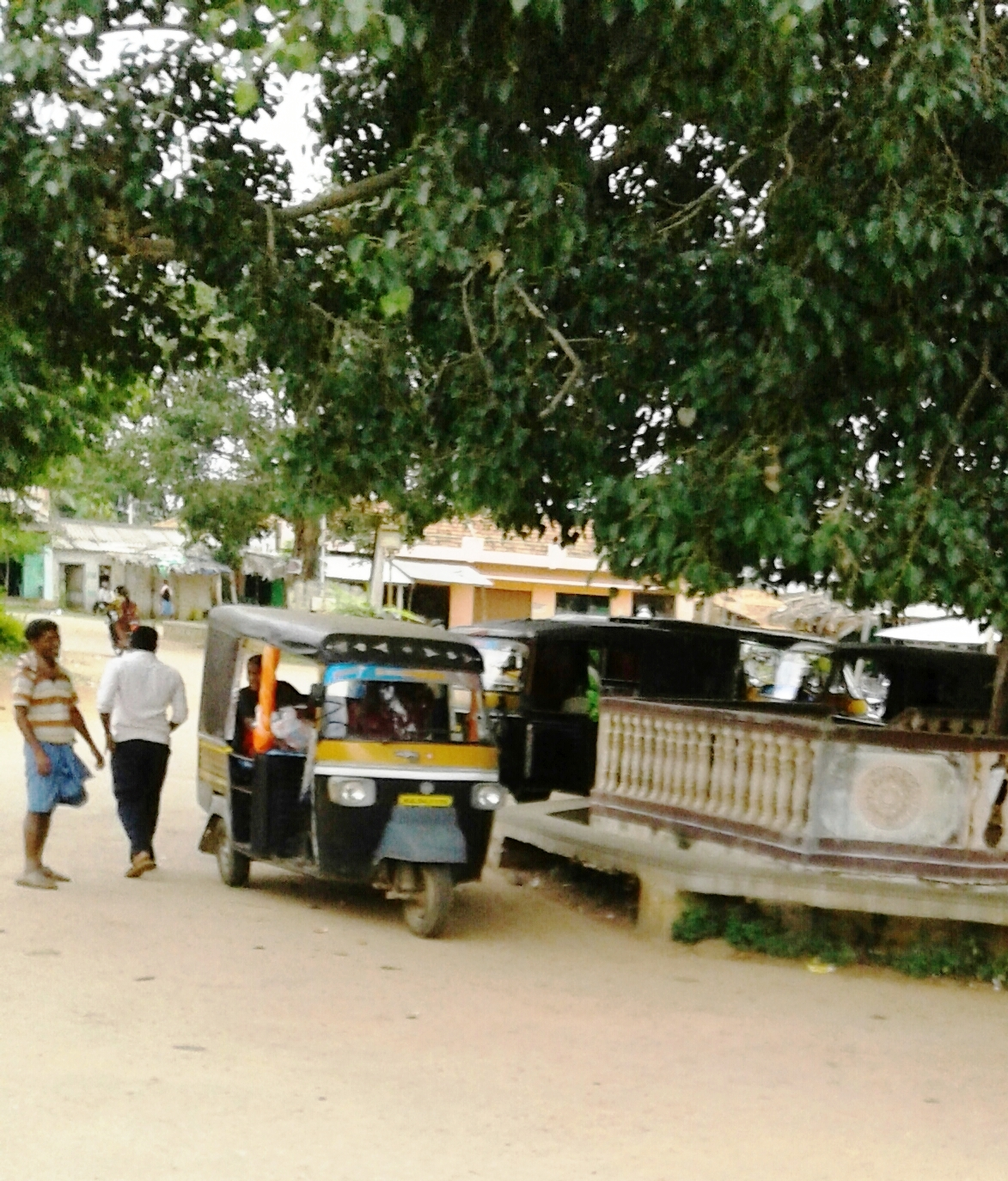
Bus stop

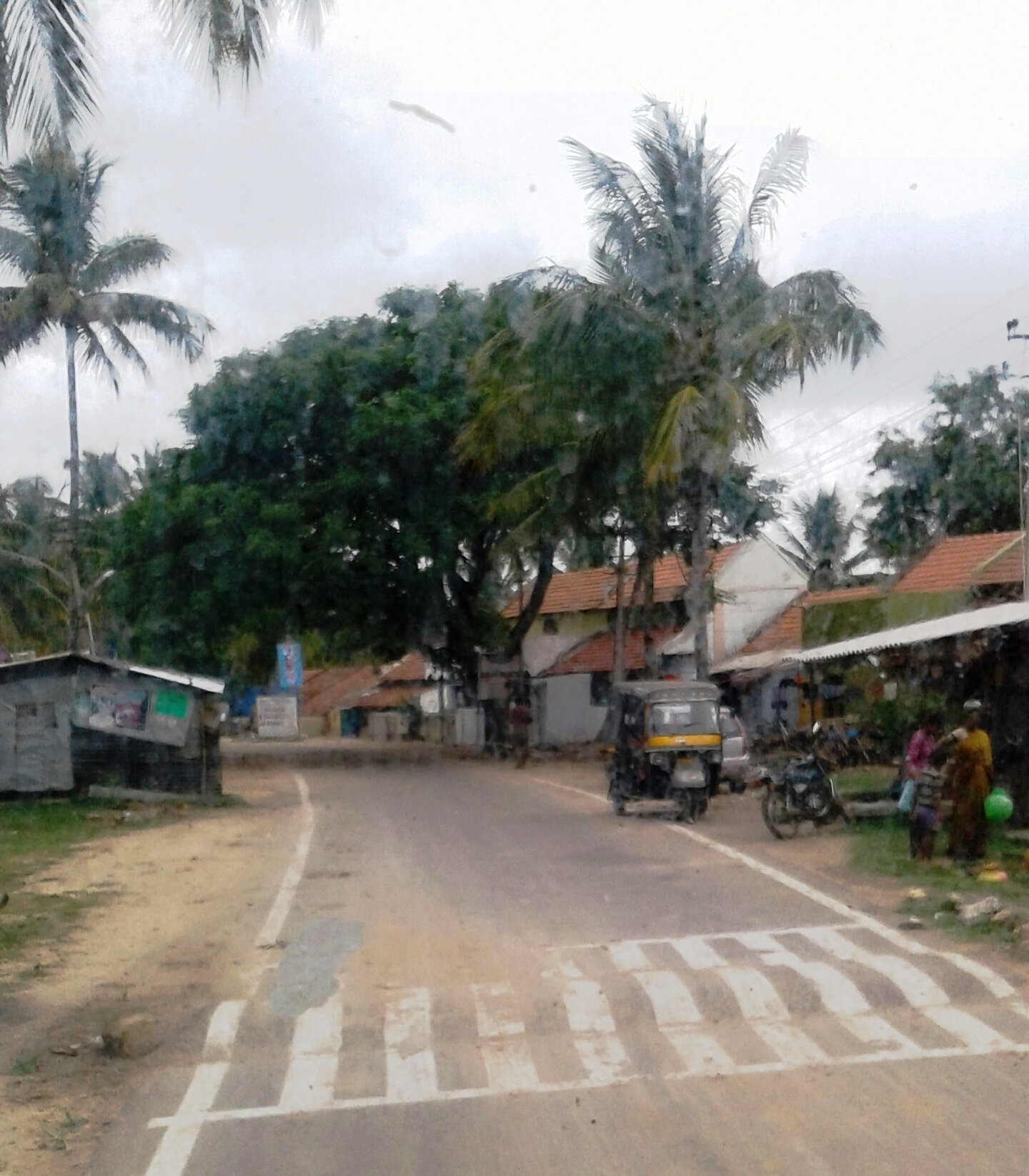
Vasanthapura

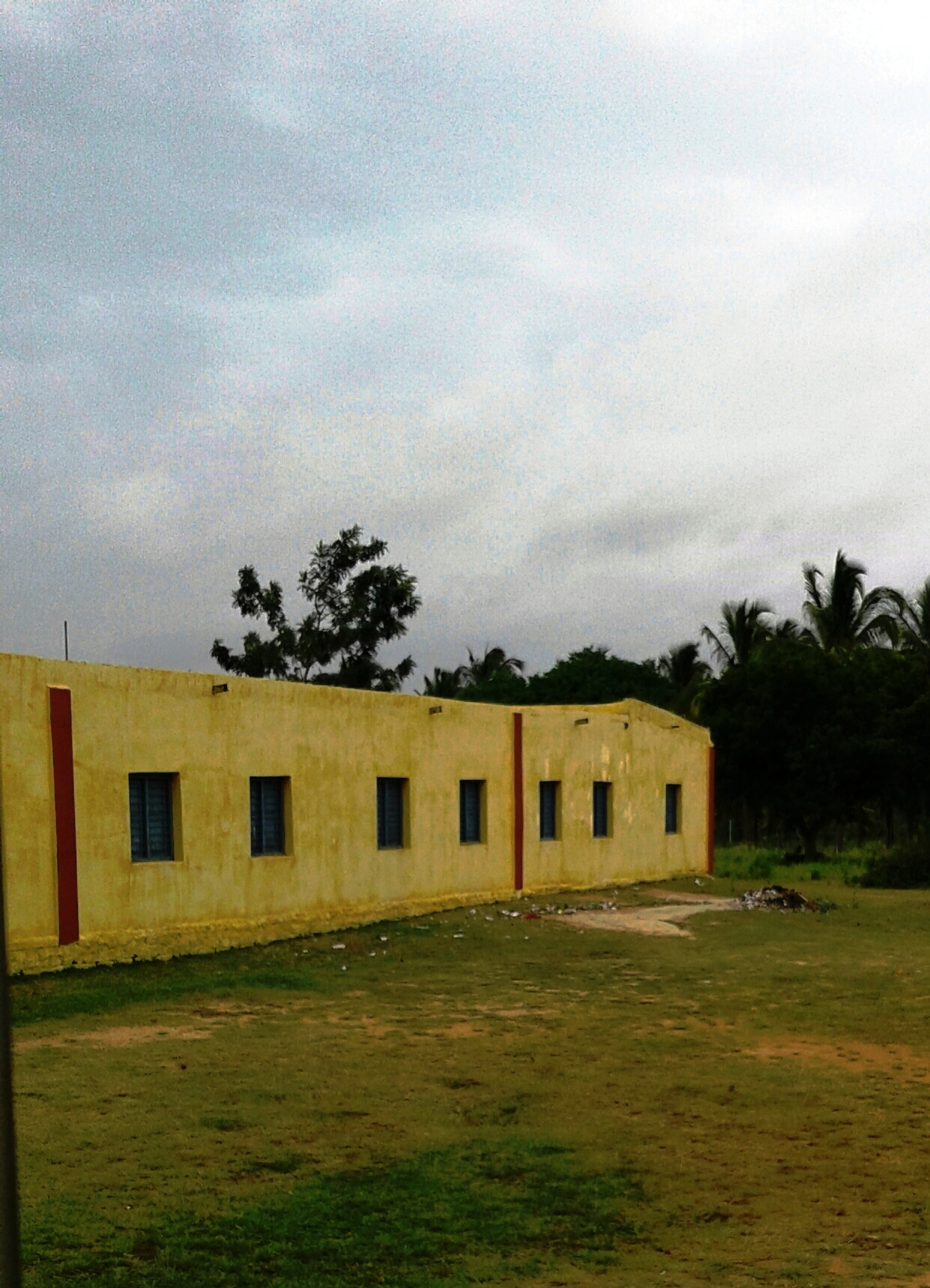
Neethimangala

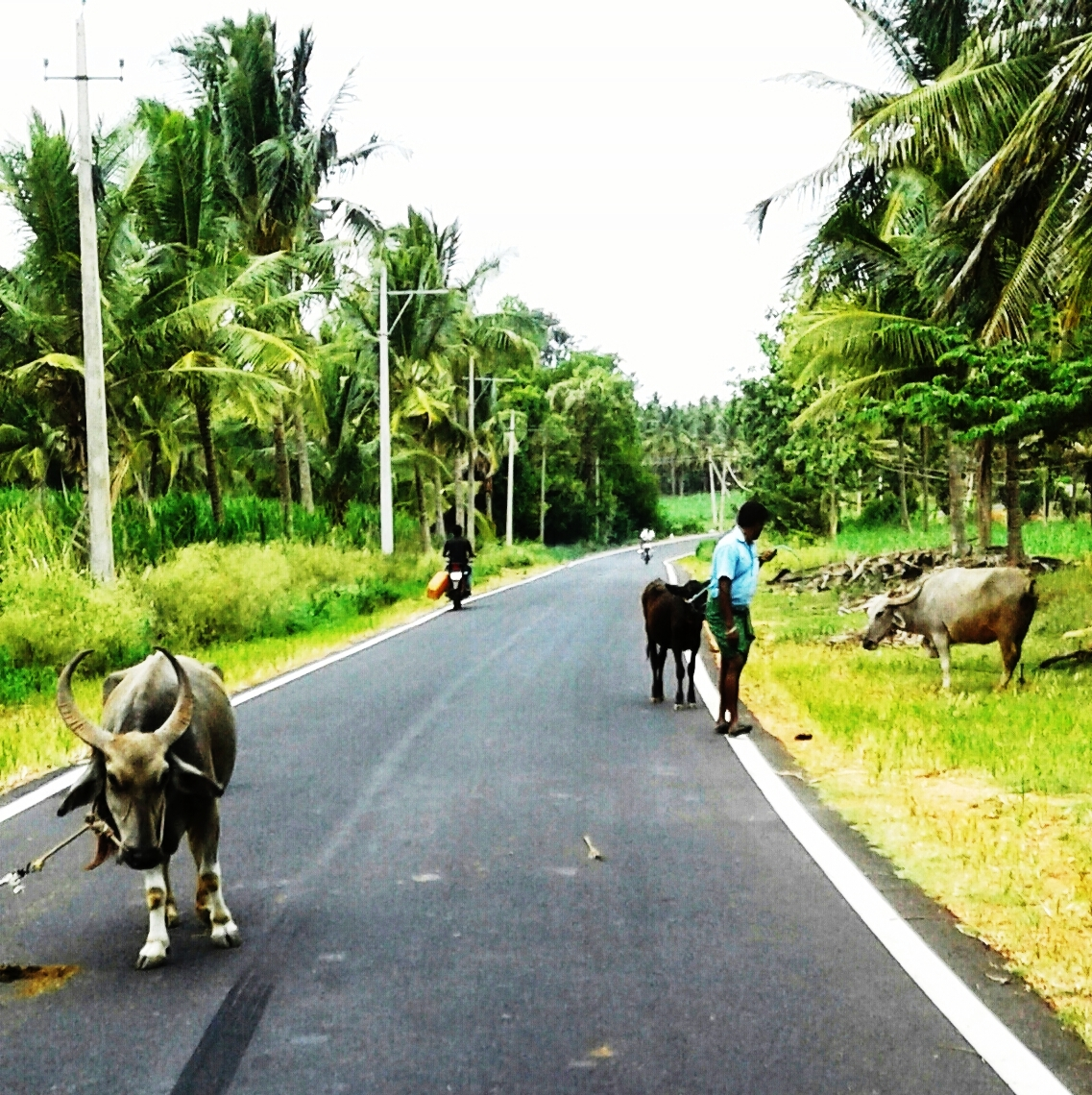
Melkoute Road

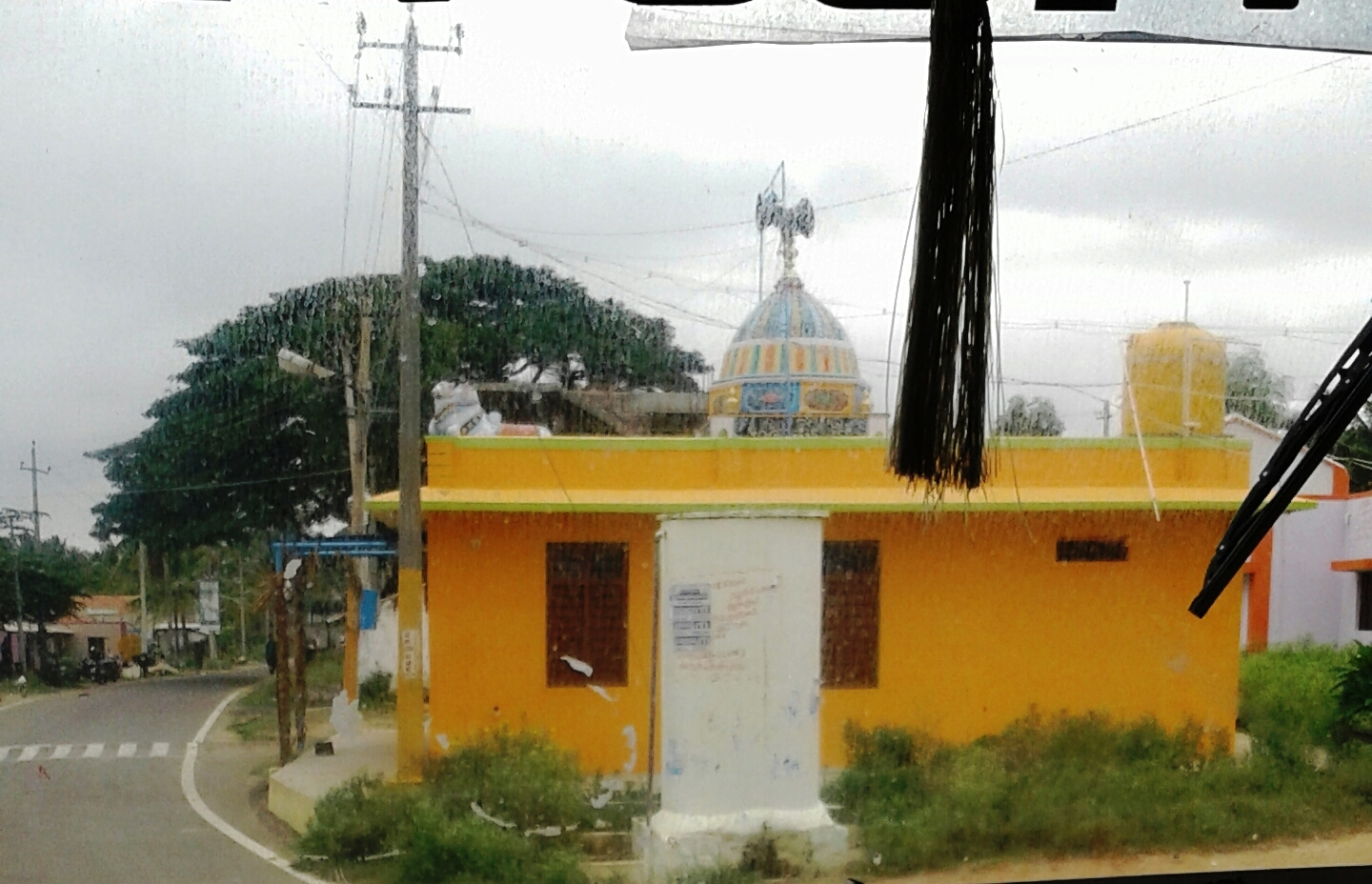
Harlahalli
