= Shaktiman (horse) =

Uttarakhand Police horse (died 2016)

Location of India's Uttarakhand state where the incident occurred

Shaktiman was a Marwari horse who served the Uttarakhand Police Force and died from wounds received on duty in 2016. The incident caused considerable controversy in Uttarakhand around animal cruelty, and the use of animals in policing. The horse's death created a conversation in India around animal rights and political power, as the alleged perpetrators of the attack on the horse were serving political cabinet ministers.

== Incident ==
On March 14, 2016, police horse Shaktiman was attacked with a stick by BJP MLA politician and cabinet minister Ganesh Joshi during a protest organized by BJP against the Chief Minister of Uttarakhand. In the melee, another man grabbed the horse by its bridle, unbalancing the horse, who fell and fractured a leg, shattering it completely. Joshi was later arrested. The incident created a huge uproar from citizens, celebrities and animal rights activists worldwide, though Joshi claimed the horse had been injured because its leg had gotten stuck in a pothole. Once the video of BJP MLA attacking Shaktiman was out in social media, experts across the world offered to help Shaktiman so that he could recover soon.

On 18 March Joshi was arrested by authorities in relation to the incident.

== Treatment and death ==
Veterinarians in Dehradun, Uttarakhand treated Shaktiman, but his leg soon became infected with gangrene. Shaktiman had a difficult process in recovery at the police barracks. Once described as one of the force's most obedient and "jolly" horses, Shakitman struggled to eat after his injury and was visibly uncomfortable. The equine lost 70 kg in the weeks after the incident.

Later his injured limb was amputated to save his life. Following its amputation, Shaktiman was fitted with a prosthetic leg imported from the United States. Shaktiman was observed briefly wandering out of his makeshift enclosure amid cheers and claps from the team that looked after him.

On 20 April 2016, Shaktiman died after being sedated for a minor surgery. Uttarakhand Chief Minister Harish Rawat was among those who visited its enclosure after its death. The horse was later buried with "police honours".

== Aftermath ==
A statue was prepared to commemorate Shaktiman's death, but was removed after controversy.

Five years after the attack, Joshi was acquitted of wrongdoing in the incident that caused Shaktiman's death. When the Uttarakhand government did not file an appeal after Joshi's acquittal, further legal indictments were filed.
