= Defence Security Corps =

Military unit of the Indian Army

- Insignia of the DSC
- Active: 25 February 1947 – Present
- Country: India
- Branch: Indian Army
- Role: Protection and Security of Defence Installations
- Size: 30,000 to 40,000
- Regimental Centre: Kannur, Kerala
- Motto: "Raksha Tatha Surkasha"
- Anniversaries: 25 February

The Defence Security Corps (DSC) is corps of the Indian Army responsible for providing security cover to the defence installations of the three services (the Army, the Navy, the Air Force) and other sensitive installations. The DSC troops are sanctioned and attached to various bases/installations to ensure protection against sabotage and pilferage. It is the sixth largest corps of the Army.

Currently, the major sanction of DSC troops is for the Army and Air force installations. The Naval units and other user agencies have a sizeable deployment of this force. DSC troops also provide security to some of the Indian Ordnance Factories, India's nuclear laboratories, and Defence Research and Development Organisation (DRDO) establishments.

The idea of the Defence Security Corps (DSC) like force dates back to the pre-independence era. Before World War II, the regular army units, garrison troops and watch and ward wings were tasked to provide security cover for various defence installations. Due to the problems faced in protecting the defence depots, factories, and other installations, a new organization dedicated to the protection and security of defence-related installations was found necessary, and approval of the Government of India was accorded on 25 Feb 1947. The Corps was initially formed as ‘Defence Department Constabulary’ on 25 April 1947 with police titles and badges of rank. In 1948, the force was renamed as Ministry of Defence Security Corps (MDSC) with military titles and badges of rank. In 1958, the force was reorganized and brought under Army Headquarters and re-designated as 'Defence Security Corps'. DSC troops are maintained on similar lines as army units.

== History ==
The idea of the Defence Security Corps (DSC) like force dates back to the pre-independence era. Before World War II, the regular army units, garrison troops, watch and ward wings, and chowkidars were tasked to provide security cover for various defence installations. Due to the problems faced in protecting the defence depots, factories, and other installations, a new organization dedicated to the protection and security of defence-related installations was found necessary, and approval of the Government of India was accorded on 25 Feb 1947. The Corps was initially formed as ‘Defence Department Constabulary’ on 25 April 1947 with police titles and badges of rank. In 1948, the force was renamed as ‘Ministry of Defence Security Corps (MDSC)’ with military titles and badges of rank. In 1958, the force was reorganized and brought under Army Headquarters and re-designated as 'Defence Security Corps'. DSC troops are maintained on similar lines as army units.

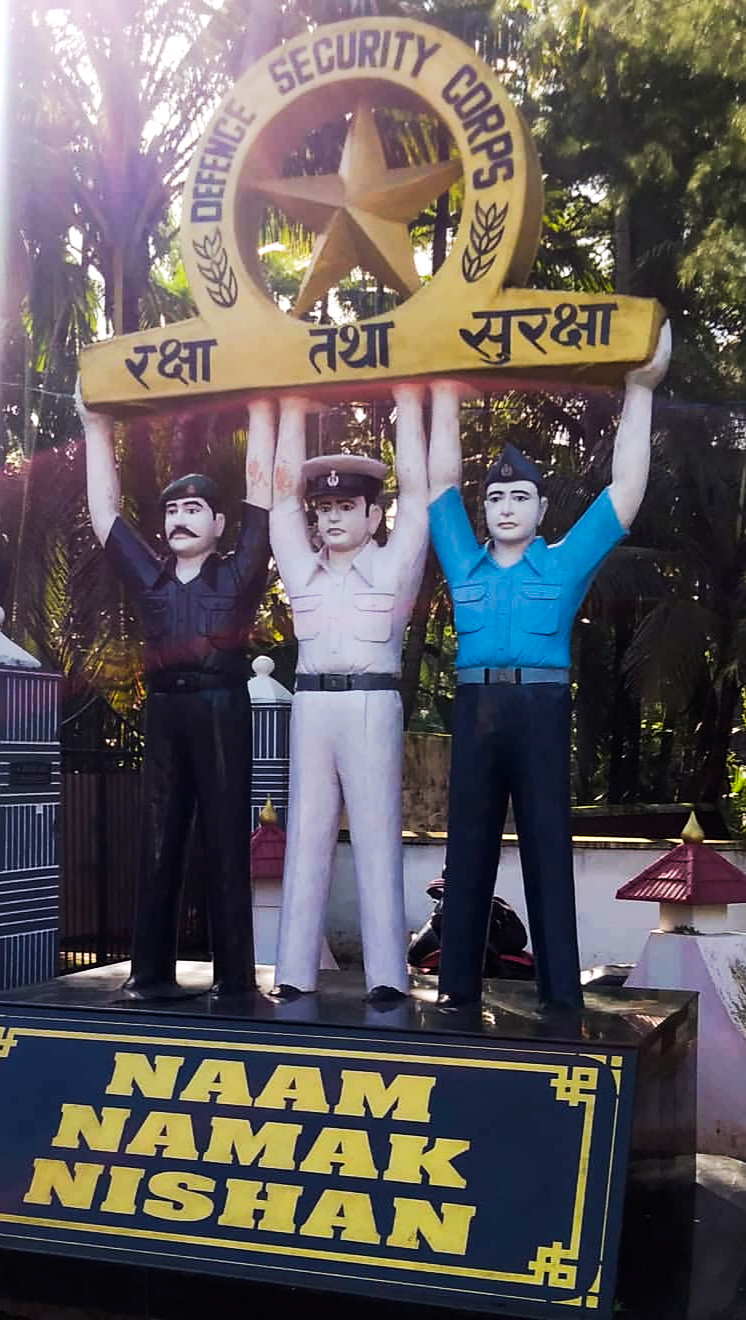
Statue at DSC Centre, Kannur Cantonment. "Naam, Namak Aur Nishan," is an ethos that calls upon Indian soldiers to strive for the good name of their country, the salt that they have partaken and the glory of the national flag/regimental standard, to the extent of making the supreme sacrifice of their lives when required.

== Role & Function ==
The DSC troops serve throughout the country also in the areas designated as field, high altitude, or operational areas. The DSC personnel perform duties and functions of armed security staff, static guards, searchers, escorts, and mobile patrols by night and day. DSC soldiers are clad in either Indian police khaki or military camouflage.

DSC troops mainly consists of superannuated soldiers and Territorial Army personnel joined via re-enrollment or lateral transfer. DSC personnel are armed, and equipped and trained by the DSC Centre to deal with a range of situations.

The DSC Centre, DSC Records, and PAO (DSC) is located in the city of Kannur, Kerala, on the road to Payyambalam Beach. The area is a part of the Cannanore Cantonment. The DSC center at Kannur is the mother depot to all platoons in the constitution.

== Motto ==
The corps motto is "Raksha Tatha Suraksha", which translates to "Defence and Security".

The motto signifies the ultimate duty of DSC troops to protect and safeguard the defence installations.

== Operations ==
2001 AFS Awantipur attack: On 22 Oct 2001, at 1330 hrs, four Pakistani terrorists belonging to Lashkar-e-Taiba, who were armed, attacked the main gate of the Air Force Station Awantipora. The DSC soldiers held on to their post and relentlessly continued to direct the firepower on the terrorists till all of them were killed.

2016 Pathankot attack: On 2 January 2016, a heavily armed group of terrorists, suspected of belonging to Jaish-e-Mohammad, attacked the Pathankot Air Force Station. Five DSC soldiers on the base died while fighting the terrorists.

2016 CAD Pulgaon explosion: On 31 May 2016, 15 Defence Security Corps (DSC) soldiers lost their lives in a massive fire that broke out at the Central Ammunition Depot Pulgaon in Maharashtra.

Kerala Floods 2018 & 2019: 5 columns of DSC soldiers were deployed for rescue and relief efforts in different flood-affected districts of Kerala in the years 2018 and 2019.

== Gallantry awards ==
The DSC personnel have exhibited valour and made supreme sacrifices in the line of duty.

- 3 Vir Chakras
- 1 Kirti Chakra
- 4 Shaurya Chakras
- 10 Sena Medals
