= Parliament of India =

Bicameral legislature of India

Coordinates: 28°37′2″N 77°12′29″E

Parliament of India Bhāratīya Sansad

Type
- Type: Bicameral
- Houses: Rajya Sabha (Council of States); Lok Sabha (House of the People)

History
- Founded: 26 January 1950 (76 years ago)
- Preceded by: Constituent Assembly of India

Leadership
- President: Droupadi Murmu since 11 January 2022
- Chairman of the Rajya Sabha: C.P. Radhakrishnan since 12 January 2025
- Speaker of the Lok Sabha: Om Birla since 19 June 2019
- Prime Minister: Narendra Modi, BJP since 26 May 2014

Structure
- Seats: 788; 245 Members of Rajya Sabha; 543 Members of Lok Sabha
- Rajya Sabha political groups: Government: National Democratic Alliance (153); Opposition: Indian National Developmental Inclusive Alliance (63); Others: (29)
- Lok Sabha political groups: Government: National Democratic Alliance (319); Opposition: Indian National Developmental Inclusive Alliance (184); Others: (38); Vacant: (2)

Elections
- Rajya Sabha voting system: Single transferable vote
- Lok Sabha voting system: First-past-the-post
- First Rajya Sabha election: 1952
- First Lok Sabha election: 25 October 1951 – 21 February 1952
- Last Rajya Sabha election: 2026
- Last Lok Sabha election: 19 April – 1 June 2024
- Next Rajya Sabha election: 2027
- Next Lok Sabha election: By May 2029

Meeting place
- Sansad Bhavan 118, Rafi Marg, New Delhi Delhi, India – 110001

Website
- sansad.in

Constitution
- Constitution of India

The Parliament of India (ISO: Bhāratīya Saṁsada) is the supreme legislative body of the Republic of India. It is a bicameral legislature composed of the Rajya Sabha (Council of States) and the Lok Sabha (House of the People). The President of India, in their role as head of the legislature, has full powers to summon and prorogue either house of Parliament or to dissolve the Lok Sabha, but they can exercise these powers only upon the advice of the Prime Minister of India and the Central Council of Ministers who sit in and answer to Parliament and form the Government of India.

Those elected or nominated (by the president) to either house of the Parliament are referred to as members of Parliament (MPs). The members of parliament in the Lok Sabha are directly elected by the voting of Indian citizens in single-member districts and the members of parliament in the Rajya Sabha are elected by the members of all state legislative assemblies by proportional representation. The Parliament has a sanctioned strength of 543 in the Lok Sabha and 245 in the Rajya Sabha including 12 nominees from the expertise of different fields of literature, art, science, and social service. The Parliament meets at Sansad Bhavan in New Delhi. The Parliament of India represents the largest democratic electorate in the world (the second being the European Parliament), with an electorate of 968 million eligible voters in 2024. On 28 May 2023, Prime Minister Narendra Modi, unveiled and inaugurated the New Parliament Building (Sansad Bhavan), located adjacent to the previous one.

== History ==
During the British rule, the legislative branch of India was the Imperial Legislative Council, which was created in 1861 via the Indian Councils Act 1861 and disbanded in 1947, when India gained independence. Following independence, the Constituent Assembly of India was elected to write the Constitution of India. In 1950 after the constitution came into force, the Constituent Assembly of India was disbanded, and succeeded by the Parliament of India, which is active to this day.

== Parliament House ==
=== Old premises (Samvidhan Sadan) ===
The Old Parliament House (Samvidhan Sadan) is located in New Delhi. It was designed by Edwin Lutyens and Herbert Baker, who were made responsible for the planning and construction of New Delhi by the British government, as the home of the Central Legislative Assembly, the Council of State, and the Chamber of Princes. The construction of the building took six years, and the opening ceremony was performed on 18 January 1927 by the viceroy and governor-general of India, Lord Irwin. The construction cost for the building was ₹8.3 million (US$86,000).

The building is 21 metres (70 ft) tall, 170 metres (560 ft) in diameter and covers an area of 2.29 hectares (5.66 acres). The Central Hall consists of the chambers of the Lok Sabha, the Rajya Sabha, and the library hall. Surrounding these three chambers is the four-storied circular structure providing accommodations for members and houses parliamentary committees, offices and the Ministry of Parliamentary Affairs. The center and the focus of the building is the Central Hall. It consists of chambers of the Lok Sabha, the Rajya Sabha, and the Library Hall, and between them lie garden courts. Surrounding these three chambers is the four-storied circular structure providing office spaces for ministers, chairmen, parliamentary committees, party offices, important offices of the Lok Sabha and Rajya Sabha Secretariat, and also the offices of the Ministry of Parliamentary Affairs. The Central Hall is circular in shape and the dome is 30 metres (98 ft) in diameter.

It is a place of historical importance. The Indian Constitution was framed in the Central Hall. The Central Hall was originally used in the library of the erstwhile Central Legislative Assembly and the Council of States. In 1946, it was converted and refurbished into the Constituent Assembly Hall.

=== New premises (Sansad Bhavan) ===
A new parliament building called the Sansad Bhavan was inaugurated on 28 May 2023. The old building, an 85-year-old structure suffers from inadequacy of space to house members and their staff and is thought to suffer from structural issues. The building also needs to be protected because of its heritage tag. The new building, with a built-up area of approximately 65,000 sq m and a distinctive triangular shape, optimally utilizes space. It houses an expanded Lok Sabha Hall, accommodating up to 888 seats, and a larger Rajya Sabha hall, accommodating up to 384 seats, with the Lok Sabha capable of accommodating up to 1,272 seats for joint sessions of Parliament. The Lok Sabha Hall draws inspiration from India's national bird, incorporating a peacock theme, while the Rajya Sabha hall is designed with a lotus theme, reflecting India's national flower. Additionally, a state-of-the-art Constitutional Hall symbolically and physically places Indian citizens at the heart of democracy. Prime Minister Narendra Modi laid the foundation for the new Parliament building on 10 December 2020. With an estimated cost of ₹ 9.71 billion, the new building was inaugurated in 2023. The first session in the New Parliament took place on 19 September 2023.

== Composition ==
The Indian Parliament consists of two houses, namely, the Lok Sabha and the Rajya Sabha, with the President of India acting as their head.

=== President of India ===
The President of India, the head of state, is a component of Parliament vide Article 79 of the Constitution. Under Article 60 and Article 111 of the constitution, the president's responsibility is to ensure that laws passed by the Parliament adhere to the relevant constitutional provisions and that the Constitution's stipulated procedures are followed before granting approval to bills. The president of India is elected by the elected members of the Parliament of India and the state Legislative Assemblies and serves for a term of five years.

=== Lok Sabha ===
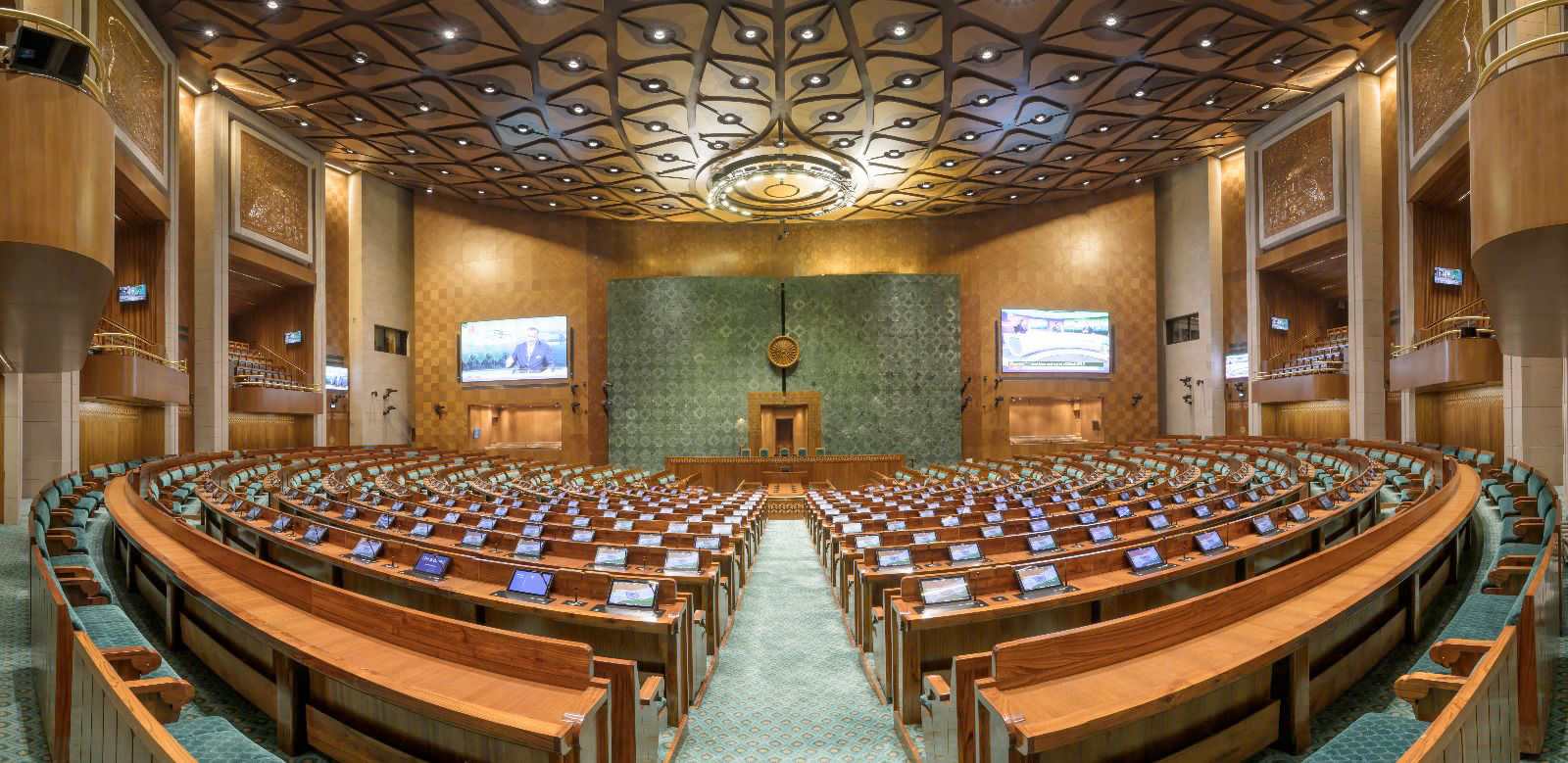
Lok Sabha Chamber at the new Parliament building

The Lok Sabha (House of the People) or the lower house has 543 members. Members are directly elected by citizens of India on the basis of universal adult franchise representing parliamentary constituencies across the country. Between 1952 and 2020, two additional members of the Anglo-Indian community were also nominated by the president of India on the advice of the Indian government, which was abolished in January 2020 by the 104th Constitutional Amendment Act, 2019.

Every citizen of India who is over 18 years of age, irrespective of gender, caste, religion, or race and is otherwise not disqualified, is eligible to vote for members of the Lok Sabha. The constitution provides that the maximum strength of the Lok Sabha be 550 members. The Lok Sabha has a term of five years. To be eligible for membership in the Lok Sabha, a person must be a citizen of India and must be 25 years of age or older, not hold any office of profit under Central or state government, mentally sound, should not be bankrupt, and should not be criminally convicted. The total elective membership is distributed among the states in such a way that the ratio between the number of seats allotted to each state and the population of the state is, so far as practicable, the same for all states. Out of 543 seats of Lok Sabha, 84 seats are reserved for Scheduled castes and 47 seats are reserved for Scheduled tribe.

=== Rajya Sabha ===
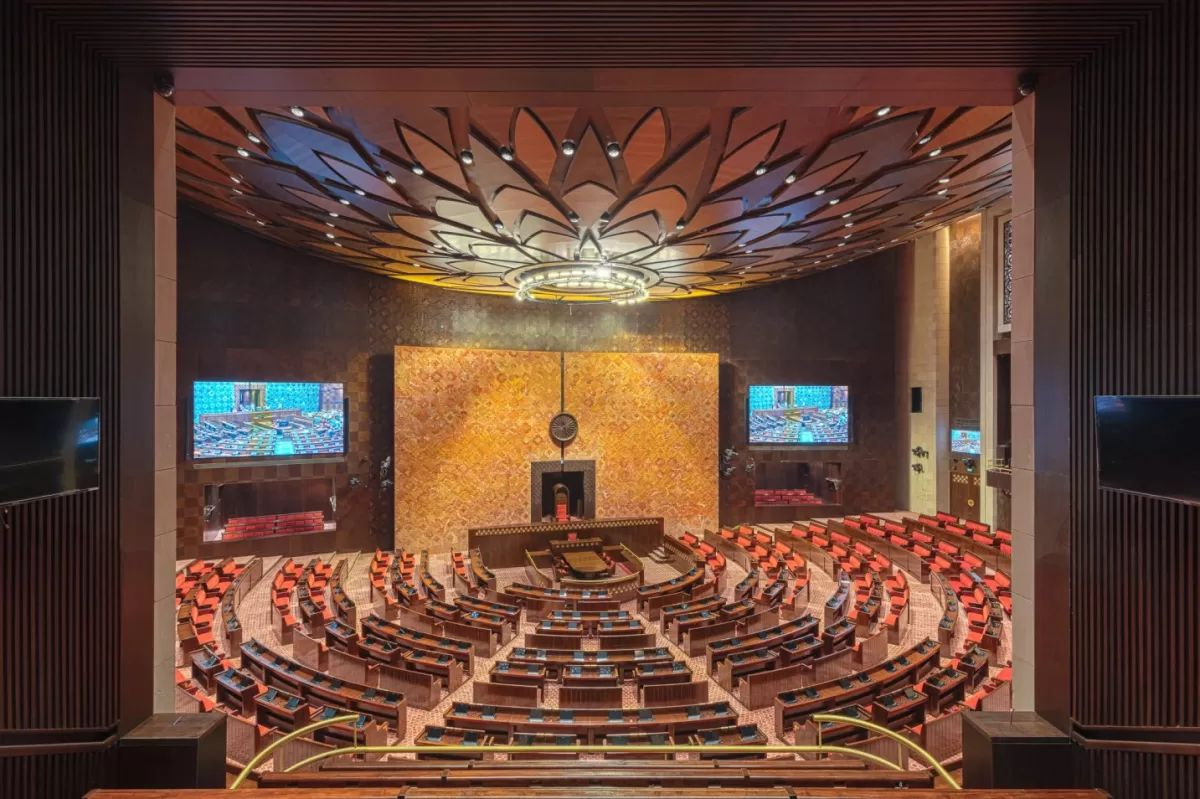
Rajya Sabha Chamber

The Rajya Sabha (Council of States) or the Upper House is a permanent body not subject to dissolution. One-third of the members retire every second year and are replaced by newly elected members. Each member is elected for a term of six years. Its members are indirectly elected by elected members of legislative assembly of the states. The Rajya Sabha can have a maximum of 250 members. It currently has a sanctioned strength of 245 members, of which 233 are elected from states, and union territories and 12 are nominated by the president. The number of members from a state depends on its population. The minimum age for a person to become a member of the Rajya Sabha is 30 years. There are no caste-based reservations in Rajya Sabha.

== Powers ==
As the primary institution responsible for lawmaking, the Indian Parliament possesses a wide array of powers that form the backbone of the country's democratic governance.

- Legislative Powers:
  1. Enacting Laws: The Parliament is vested with the authority to make laws on subjects enumerated in the Central List and Concurrent List under the Constitution of India. Bills can be introduced in either house, and upon approval, they become laws after receiving the President's assent
  2. Amending the Constitution: The Parliament can amend the Constitution with the support of a special majority, allowing for modifications to accommodate changing societal needs and aspirations.
  3. Residuary Powers: The Parliament holds exclusive authority over matters not covered by the Central or State Lists, known as residuary powers.
- Financial Powers:
  1. Formulation and Approval of the Central Budget: The Parliament plays a vital role in the development and endorsement of the Central Budget. It carefully examines the government's proposals for revenue generation and expenditure, provides suggestions for modifications if necessary, and ultimately grants or withholds financial allocations accordingly.
  2. Taxation: Parliament has the power to levy and collect taxes, including income tax, customs and excise duties, and goods and services tax (GST).
  3. Control over Public Expenditure: The Parliament scrutinizes government expenditure through debates and discussions on budgetary allocations, ensuring accountability and transparency.
- Executive Powers:
  1. Council of Ministers: The Parliament exercises executive powers indirectly through its control over the Council of Ministers. The government is collectively responsible to the Parliament, and its policies and actions are subject to parliamentary scrutiny.
  2. Vote of No Confidence: The Parliament can remove the government from power through a vote of no confidence. If the government fails to enjoy the majority's support (in Lok Sabha), it must resign.
  3. Questions and Motions: Members of Parliament have the right to raise questions, seek clarifications, and move motions regarding the functioning of the government and its policies.
- Oversight Powers:
  1. Question Hour: Members of Parliament can ask questions of ministers during the Question Hour, seeking clarifications on matters of public interest.
  2. Committees: The Parliament appoints various committees, such as the Public Accounts Committee (PAC), the Estimates Committee, and the Committee on Public Undertakings, to oversee and examine government policies, programs, and their implementation.
  3. Impeachment Power: The Parliament has the authority to initiate impeachment proceedings against the President, Vice President, and Judges of the Supreme Court and High Courts for the violation of the Constitution.

== Sessions ==
The period during which the House meets to conduct its business is called a session. The constitution empowers the president to summon each house at such intervals that there should not be more than a six-month gap between the two sessions. Hence the Parliament must meet at least twice a year. In India, the Parliament conducts three sessions each year.

- Budget session: The Budget Session is arguably the most crucial session of the Indian Parliament. It typically commences in February and concludes in May. The primary objective of this session is to discuss, debate, and pass the annual Central Budget, which outlines the government's fiscal policies and priorities for the upcoming financial year. Members of Parliament scrutinize the budget proposals, propose amendments, and engage in comprehensive discussions to ensure transparency and accountability in the allocation of funds.
- Monsoon session: The Monsoon Session of Parliament usually takes place between July and August. It derives its name from the occurrence of the monsoon season during this time. This session primarily focuses on enacting legislation, as it provides an opportunity for Members of Parliament to introduce bills, engage in extensive debates, and collectively decide on their passage. Apart from legislative functions, this session also involves discussions on various issues of national importance, enabling the government to address concerns raised by the opposition and seek their support.
- Winter session: The Winter Session, held between November and December, serves as the last parliamentary session of the calendar year. Its main purpose is to ensure a comprehensive review of the government's policies and initiatives, allowing Members of Parliament to critically analyze their effectiveness. This session witnesses the introduction of bills, discussions on pending legislation, and the examination of the government's performance through questions, motions, and debates. The Winter Session is vital for fostering accountability and transparency in governance.
- Special Sessions: In addition to the regular sessions, the Indian Parliament also holds special sessions to address urgent matters or crises that require immediate attention. These sessions are convened outside the usual schedule and are dedicated to discussing specific issues of national importance. Special sessions provide a platform for focused deliberations, enabling swift decision-making and action in response to emergencies or critical circumstances.

== Functions ==
=== Legislative functions ===
Legislative proposals are brought before either house of the Parliament in the form of a bill. A bill is the draft of a legislative proposal, which, when passed by both houses of Parliament and assented to by the president, becomes an act of Parliament. Money bills must originate in the Lok Sabha. The Rajya Sabha can only make recommendations over the bills to the House, within a period of fourteen days.

== Parliamentary committees ==
Parliamentary committees are formed to deliberate specific matters at length. The public is directly or indirectly associated, and studies are conducted to help committees arrive at the conclusions. Parliamentary committees are of two kinds: standing committees and ad hoc committees.

Standing committees are permanent committees constituted from time to time in pursuance of the provisions of an act of Parliament or rules of procedure and conduct of business in Parliament. The work of these committees is of a continuing nature. Ad hoc committees are appointed for a specific purpose, and they cease to exist when they finish the task assigned to them and submit a report.

== Privileges ==
Parliamentary privileges play a crucial role in safeguarding the functioning of the Indian Parliament and upholding its authority as the primary legislative body in the country. These privileges grant certain rights and immunize Members of Parliament, enabling them to perform their duties effectively, express their views freely, and ensure democratic accountability.

- Freedom of Speech: One of the most fundamental parliamentary privileges is the freedom of speech and expression granted to Members of Parliament. This privilege allows legislators to articulate their opinions and viewpoints without fear of legal consequences or outside interference. By protecting freedom of speech, parliamentary privileges ensure that parliamentarians can openly debate, discuss, and criticize government policies and actions, thus contributing to robust decision-making and democratic governance.
- Immunity from Legal Action: Parliamentary privileges grant lawmakers immunity from civil and criminal proceedings for any statements made or actions performed within the Parliament or its committees. This immunity allows Members of Parliament to express their opinions and engage in debates without the fear of legal repercussions. By safeguarding parliamentarians from external legal actions, these privileges facilitate open and uninhibited discussions, fostering an environment conducive to the free exchange of ideas.
- Access to Information: Parliamentary privileges also encompass the right to access information necessary for effective legislation and oversight. Members of Parliament have the authority to seek information from government officials, ministries, and public authorities to gather facts, scrutinize policies, and hold the government accountable. This privilege enables parliamentarians to obtain critical data, documents, and reports to make informed decisions and represent the interests of their constituents effectively.
- Control over Internal Affairs: Parliamentary privileges grant the legislature the power to regulate its internal affairs, proceedings, and discipline. The Speaker of the Lok Sabha and the Chairman of the Rajya Sabha exercise these privileges to maintain decorum, ensure orderly debates, and enforce rules of procedure. This control over internal affairs allows the Indian Parliament to function independently, protect its integrity, and maintain its authority as a legislative body.
- Protection from Arrest: Parliamentary privileges provide Members of Parliament with protection from arrest in civil cases during the session of Parliament, allowing them to discharge their legislative responsibilities without hindrance. This privilege ensures that lawmakers can attend parliamentary sessions, participate in debates, and fulfill their duties without the threat of detention or interference.

== Code of conduct ==
To uphold the principles of transparency, accountability, and ethical conduct, the Indian Parliament focuses on some of the key behavioral aspects for parliamentarians.

- To maintain transparency:
1. Parliamentarians should disclose their financial interests, including assets, investments, and sources of income, to ensure transparency and prevent conflicts of interest.
2. Detailed records of parliamentary proceedings, including debates, voting records, and committee activities, should be made readily available to the public for scrutiny and accountability.
- Conflict of Interest:
  1. Parliamentarians should avoid conflicts of interest and recuse themselves from discussions or decisions that may directly or indirectly benefit them, their family members, or their associates.
  2. A clear definition of conflicts of interest and guidelines for disclosure and recusal are outlined to maintain the integrity of the legislative process.
- Respectful Discourse:
  1. Parliamentarians should engage in respectful and constructive debates, adhering to decorum and avoiding personal attacks or derogatory language.
  2. Speeches and interactions should be focused on the issues at hand, fostering a culture of healthy deliberation and informed decision-making.
- Attendance and Participation:
  1. Parliamentarians should demonstrate a high level of commitment to their duties by attending sessions regularly and actively participating in debates, voting, and committee work.
  2. Guidelines are established to ensure that absenteeism is minimal, and absence without valid reasons is addressed appropriately.
- Use of Parliamentary Privileges:
  1. Parliamentarians should exercise their parliamentary privileges responsibly, recognizing that they are not immune to legal and ethical obligations outside the Parliament.
  2. Misuse of privileges, such as obstructing justice or engaging in corrupt practices, are strictly prohibited and subjected to legal consequences.
- Accountability:
  1. Parliamentarians are accountable to the public they represent, regularly communicating with constituents, listening to their concerns, and addressing their grievances.
  2. A mechanism for public redressal and feedback are established to hold parliamentarians accountable for their actions and decisions.
- Prohibition of Corruption:
  1. Parliamentarians should be bound by stringent anti-corruption measures, including the declaration of assets, income, and liabilities, and strict adherence to existing anti-corruption laws.
  2. Strong penalties and disciplinary action should be imposed for any proven instances of corruption or unethical behavior, reinforcing a culture of integrity and zero tolerance for malpractice.

In 2022, the Lok Sabha secretariat released a booklet listing out unparliamentary words and expressions before the start of the Monsoon session on 18 July 2022. The banned words if used during debates or otherwise in both the houses would be expunged from the records of the parliament.

== Incidents ==
=== 2001 Parliament Attack ===
On 13 December 2001, the Indian Parliament was attacked by an Islamic terrorist group. The perpetrators were Lashkar-e-Taiba (Let) and Jaish-e-Mohammed (JeM) terrorists. The attack led to the deaths of five terrorists, six Delhi Police personnel, two Parliament Security Services personnel, and a gardener, which totaled 14 fatalities. The incident led to increased tensions between India and Pakistan, resulting in the 2001-02 India–Pakistan standoff.

=== 2023 Parliament Security Breach ===
On 13 December 2023, two protestors breached the new premises of parliament and entered the Lok Sabha section. The security breach was organized by six protestors. Two of the accused, Sagar Sharma and D Manoranjan, jumped into the chamber from the visitor's gallery, and opened a yellow smoke canister, in an attempt to reach the Speaker's Chair. While outside the parliament, two others, Neelam Devi and Amol Shinde, allegedly opened an aerosol canister, releasing a colored smoke.

The sixth individual, Vishal Sharma, was caught meters away from the parliament after filming and uploading the video of the protest outside Parliament to the social media platforms. The alleged leader of the protestors was Lalit Jha, who is affiliated with the Samyabadi Subhas Sabha, a non-governmental organisation in West Bengal, and calls himself a teacher on his Instagram profile. The Delhi police told the court that it was a well-planned conspiracy, and that the accused might also be associated with terrorist organisations. While the police have not officially revealed a motive, both media reports and statements from the families of the accused suggest that the protesters sought to articulate their frustration with the government's policies.

Rashtriya Loktantrik Party founder Hanuman Beniwal along with some MPs caught and overpowered the intruder and became ‘hero’ or ‘saviour’ of the Parliament. Beniwal told the media soon after - "Herogiri unki utar di, [trans. taught them a lesson]”. Beniwal soon after incident questioned BJP government on national security and called it a ‘big security lapse’ and demanded a thorough investigation. He also highlighted the timing, coinciding with the 22nd anniversary of the 2001 Indian Parliament attack.

Day after the security breach, Trinamool MP Derek O'Brien of the Rajya Sabha and 13 MPs of Lok Sabha from the Congress and the Dravida Munnetra Kazhagam parties, were suspended until 22 December for protesting by bringing placards and hindering the proceedings of the parliament by demanding answers regarding the security breach and the home minister's statement. A week after the breach, 78 more MPs were suspended, most of them part of the INDIA alliance, after protesting the security breach.

== Gallery ==
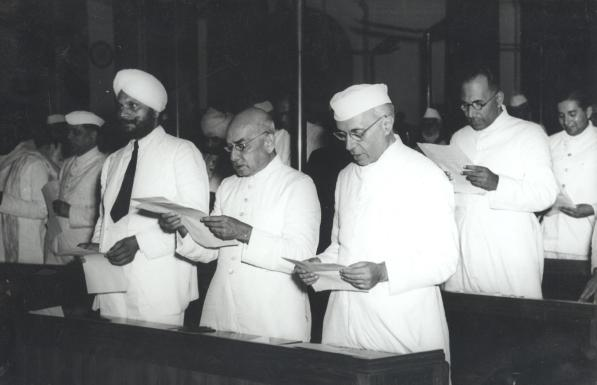
Jawaharlal Nehru and other members taking pledge during the midnight session of the Constituent Assembly of India held on 14 and 15 August 1947.

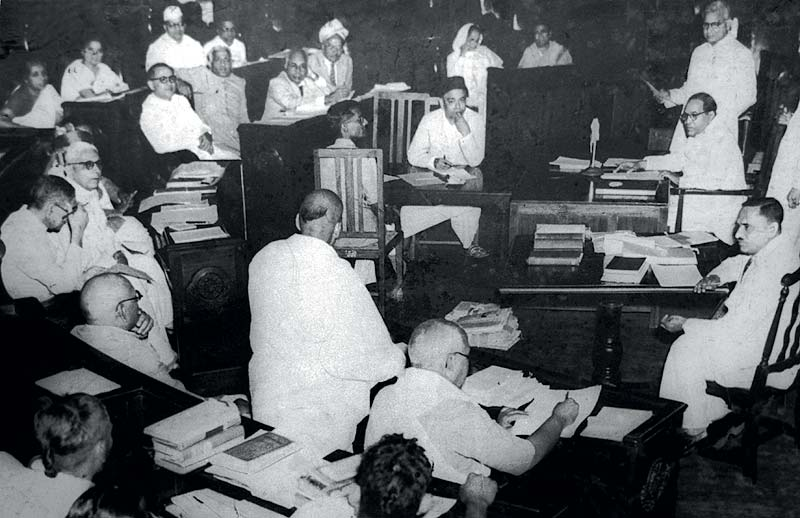
Constituent Assembly of India

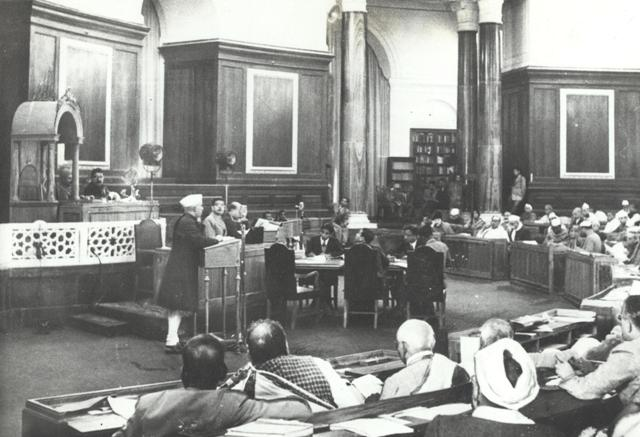
Jawaharlal Nehru addressing the Constituent Assembly in 1946.

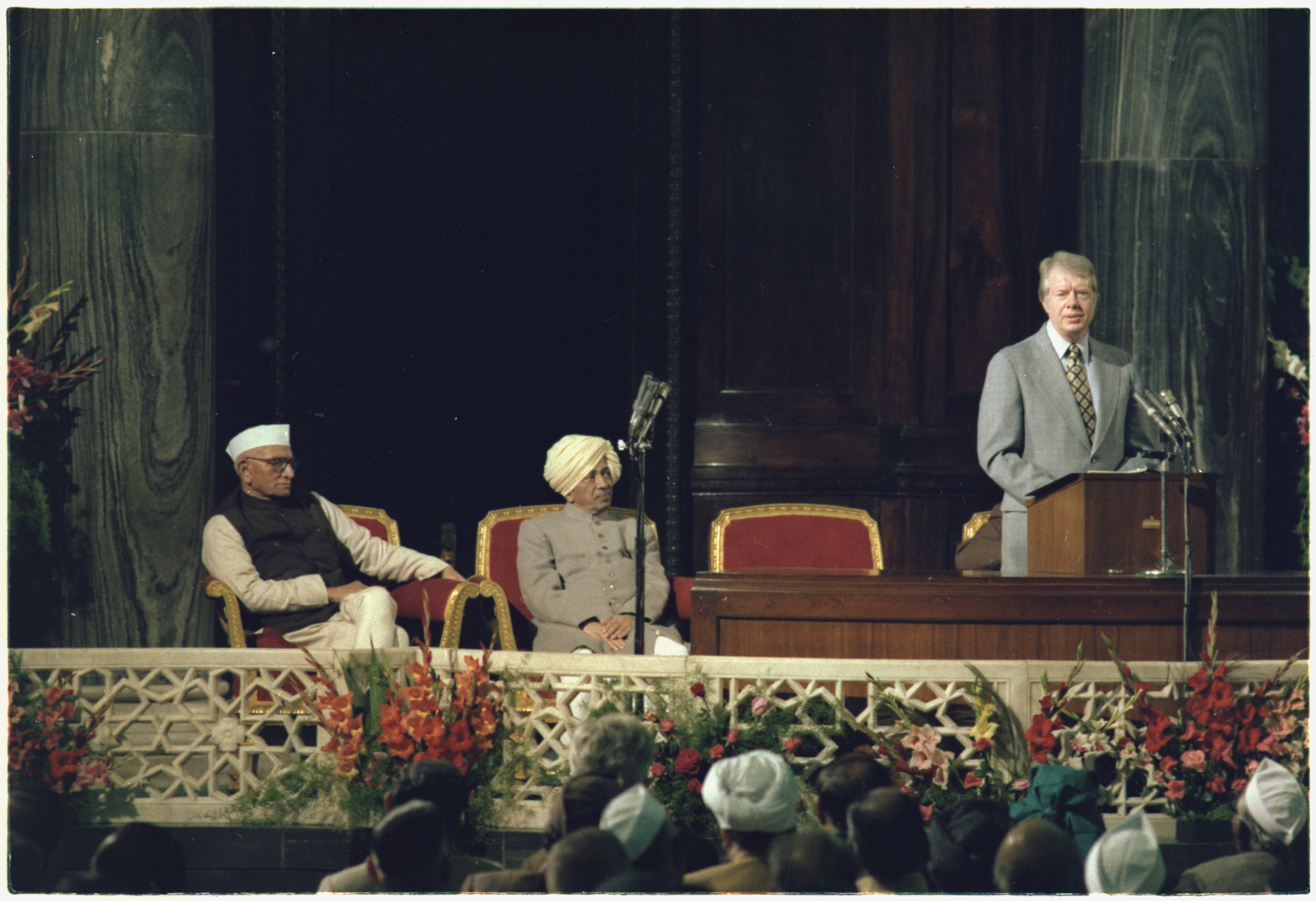
Indian prime minister Morarji Desai listens to Jimmy Carter as he addresses the Indian Parliament.

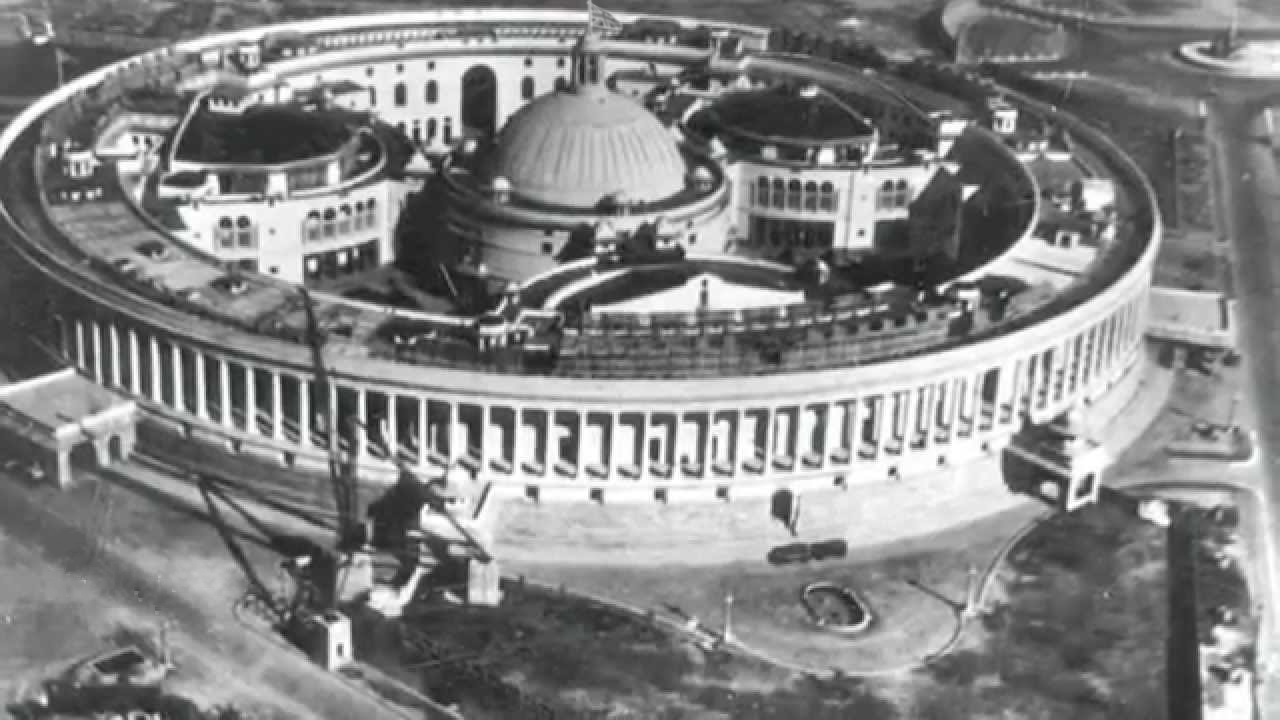
Old Parliament House, New Delhi

== See also ==
- 2001 Indian Parliament attack
- 2023 Indian Parliament breach
- Election Commission of India
- Indian Parliamentary Group
- List of constituencies of the Lok Sabha
- List of legislatures by country
- Member of Parliament, Rajya Sabha
- Member of Parliament, Lok Sabha
- PRS Legislative Research
- Politics of India
