= 2001 Indian Parliament attack =

Terrorist attack in New Delhi

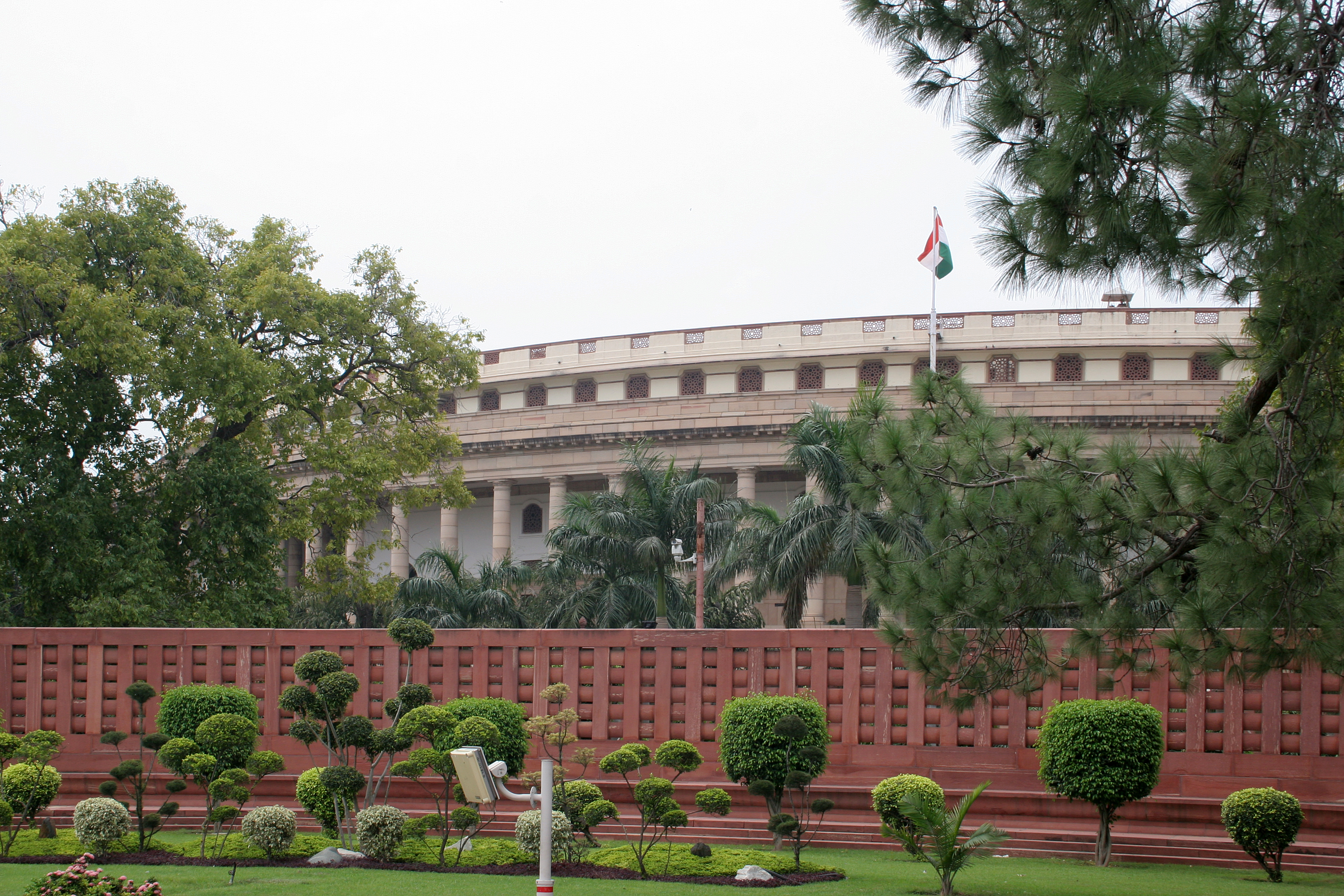
- Location: 28.6172°N 77.2081°E; New Delhi, India
- Date: 13 December 2001 (UTC+05:30)
- Attack type: Mass shooting; terrorist attack
- Weapons: AK-47 rifles, pistols, grenade launchers, hand grenades, explosive belt
- Deaths: 14 (including 5 militants)
- Injuries: 18
- Perpetrator: Jaish-e-Mohammed

The 2001 Indian Parliament attack was a terrorist attack on the Parliament of India in New Delhi, India, on 13 December 2001. The attack was carried out by five Jaish-e-Mohammed militants and resulted in the deaths of six Delhi Police personnel, two Parliament Security Service personnel, and a gardener. All five militants were killed by security forces.

Indian authorities accused Lashkar-e-Taiba (LeT) and Jaish-e-Mohammed (JeM), two militant groups operating from Pakistan, of perpetrating the attack; however, LeT denied involvement.

The incident led to increased tensions between India and Pakistan, resulting in the 2001–2002 India–Pakistan standoff.

== Attack ==
On 13 December 2001, five Jaish-e-Mohammed militants drove into the House of Parliament in a car with Home Ministry and Parliament labels. While both the Rajya Sabha and Lok Sabha had been adjourned 40 minutes prior to the incident, many members of parliament (MPs) and government officials such as Home Minister LK Advani and Minister of State for Defence Harin Pathak were believed to have still been in the building at the time of the attack. More than 100 people, including major politicians, were inside the parliament building at the time. The gunmen used a fake identity sticker on the car they drove and thus easily breached the security deployed around the parliamentary complex. The militants carried AK-47 rifles, grenade launchers, pistols and grenades.

The gunmen drove their vehicle into the car of the Indian Vice President Krishan Kant (who was in the building at the time), got out, and began shooting. The Vice President's guards and security personnel shot back at the attackers and then started closing the gates of the compound. A similar attack was carried out on the assembly of Srinagar, Jammu and Kashmir, in October 2001, killing 38 people.

Constable Kamlesh Kumari of the Central Reserve Police Force was the first to spot the militants and was shot by them as she raised the alarm. She died on the spot. One gunman's suicide vest exploded when he was shot dead; the other four gunmen were also killed. The ministers and MPs escaped unhurt. The total number of people killed by the attackers was 9 and at least 17 other people were injured in the attack.

== Perpetrators ==
Delhi Police stated that five militants carried out the attack and the names given by them were: Hamza, Haider alias Tufail, Rana, Raja and Mohammed – who were members of Jaish-e-Mohammed and were killed.

One of the militants killed had earlier also taken part in the hijacking of Indian Airlines Flight 814.

Delhi Police officials said that the gunmen had received instructions from Pakistan and the operation had been carried out under the guidance of Pakistan's Inter-Services Intelligence (ISI). In their book The Exile: The Flight of Osama bin Laden, Cathy Scott-Clark and Adrian Levy state that then-CIA station chief Robert Grenier and Ambassador Wendy Chamberlin suspected that the ISI had approved the attack in order to force the redeployment of troops under the command of Ali Jan Aurakzai away from the Durand Line, allowing Osama bin Laden to escape into Pakistan during the Battle of Tora Bora.

== Trial ==
Following the attack, many suspects were arrested, and in December 2002 four Jaish-e-Mohammed militants were convicted for roles in the attack. In 2003, the Border Security Force (BSF) eliminated Ghazi Baba, the commander-in-chief of Jaish-e-Mohammed and the mastermind of the attack, in the Noor Bagh neighborhood of Srinagar, Jammu and Kashmir.

The attack triggered extensive investigations, which revealed the involvement of four accused, namely Mohammad Afzal Guru, his cousin Shaukat Hussain Guru, Syed Abdul Rahman Geelani (also spelled "Gilani"), and Shaukat Guru's wife Afsan Guru (maiden name: Navjot Sandhu). Some other proclaimed offenders were said to be the leaders of the banned militant organization known as Jaish-e-Mohammed. After the conclusion of investigation, investigating agency filed the report under Section 173 of Criminal Procedure Code, 1973 (India) against four accused persons on 14 May 2002. Charges were framed under various sections of Indian Penal Code (IPC), the Prevention of Terrorism Act, 2002 (POTA), and the Explosive Substances Act by the designated sessions Court.

The designated Special Court was presided over by S. N. Dhingra. The accused were tried and the trial concluded within a record period of about six months. 80 witnesses were examined for the prosecution and 10 witnesses were examined on behalf of the accused S.A.R. Geelani. About 300 documents were exhibited. Afzal Guru, Shaukat Hussain and S.A.R. Geelani were convicted for the offences under Sections 121, 121A, 122, Section 120B read with Sections 302 & 307 read with Section 120B of IPC, sub-Sections (2), (3) and (5) of Section 3 and Section 4(b) of POTA and Sections 3 and 4 of Explosive Substances Act. The accused 1 and 2 were also convicted under Section 3(4) of POTA.

Accused 4, namely Navjot Sandhu a.k.a. Afsan, was acquitted of all the charges except the one under Section 123 IPC for which she was convicted and sentenced to undergo rigorous imprisonment for five years and to pay a fine. Death sentences were imposed on the other three accused for the offences under Section 302 read with Section 120B IPC and Section 3(2) of POTA. They were also sentenced to life imprisonment on as many as eight counts under the provisions of IPC, POTA and Explosive Substances Act in addition to varying amounts of fine. The amount of a million Indian rupees, which was recovered from the possession of two of the accused, namely, Afzal Guru and Shaukat Hussain, was forfeited to the State under Section 6 of the POTA.

On appeal, the high court subsequently acquitted S. A. R. Geelani and Afsan, but upheld Shaukat's and Afzal's death sentence. Geelani was represented by Ram Jethmalani in the Delhi High Court and subsequently in the Supreme Court of India. Jethmalani said it almost cost him his political career for defending Geelani. Geelani's acquittal blew a gaping hole in the prosecution's version of the parliament attack. He was presented as the mastermind of the entire attack. Geelani, a young lecturer at Delhi University, received support from his outraged colleagues and friends, who were certain that he had been framed. They contacted lawyer Nandita Haksar and asked her to take on his case.

Afzal Guru, sentenced to death by Indian court and due to be hanged on 20 October 2006, had his execution stayed. His family had camped in New Delhi to meet the President A.P.J Abdul Kalam to accept the mercy petition. The family of Kamlesh Kumari Yadav, a CRPF Jawan who died in the attack has said that they would return the Ashok Chakra, if the president accepted the petition, and on 13 December 2006, the families of the deceased returned the medals to the government. As of April 2007, Abdul Kalam refused to interfere in the judicial process. The sentence was scheduled to be carried out on 20 October 2006, but Afzal was given a stay of execution and remained on death row. On 3 February 2013, his mercy petition was rejected by the then President Pranab Mukherjee. He was hanged in Delhi's Tihar Jail at 08:00 on 9 February 2013, and buried in Tihar jail with full religious rites.

Shaukat Hussain was released nine months prior to his scheduled date of release on account of his good conduct.

Two Delhi Police officials, ACP Rajbir Singh and Mohan Chand Sharma are credited for gathering prima facie evidence in the case. Singh was later shot dead by a friend over a property deal and Sharma was killed during the Batla House encounter with militants in Delhi.

== Response ==
The Indian Government initially accused Lashkar-e-Taiba and Jaish-e-Mohammed of involvement in the attack. However, Lashkar-e-Taiba denied any involvement in the incident. In November 2002, four JeM members were arrested by Indian authorities and put on trial. All four were found guilty of playing various roles in the incident, although the fourth, Afsan/Navjot Sandhu, wife of Shaukat Hussain (one of the accused) was found guilty of a minor charge of concealing knowledge of conspiracy. One of the accused, Afzal Guru, was sentenced to death for the incident.

World leaders and leaders in India's immediate neighbourhood condemned the attack on the Parliament. On 14 December, the ruling National Democratic Alliance (NDA) blamed Pakistan-based Lashkar-e-Taiba and Jaish-e-Mohammed for the attack. Home Minister LK Advani claimed, "We have received some clues about yesterday's incident, which shows that a neighbouring country, and some terrorist organisations active there behind it", in an indirect reference to Pakistan and Pakistan-based militants groups.

The same day, in a demarche to Pakistani High Commissioner to India, Ashraf Jehangir Qazi, India demanded that Pakistan stop the activities of LeT and JeM, that Pakistan apprehend the organisations' leaders and that Pakistan curb the financial assets and the groups' access to these assets. In response to the Indian government's statements, Pakistani forces were put on high alert the same day. On 20 December, India mobilised and deployed its troops to Kashmir and Punjab in what was India's largest military mobilisation since the 1971 Indo-Pakistani War.

== In popular culture ==
Special OPS: The 2020 Indian action espionage thriller web series from Hotstar Specials created and directed by Neeraj Pandey and starring Kay Kay Menon in the lead role was based on the attacks. Attack: Part 1 is also partially based on the attacks.

Dhurandhar, a 2025 Indian spy action thriller, features the attacks as a critical driver for the titular operation by Ajay Sanyal, a character based on NSA Ajit Doval.

== See also ==
- List of Islamist terrorist attacks
- List of terrorist incidents in India
- List of attacks on legislatures
- Islamic terrorism
- Pakistan and state terrorism
- 2001 Jammu and Kashmir legislative assembly car bombing
- 2014 shootings at Parliament Hill, a similar attack that occurred in Ottawa, Canada
- 2017 Tehran attacks, which included an attack on the Iranian Parliament by gunmen and suicide bombers.
- 2021 storming of the United States Capitol
- 2023 Indian Parliament breach
