= Sansad Bhavan =

Sansad Bhawan or Sansad Bhavan may refer to:

- Jatiya Sangsad Bhaban Parliament House of Bangladesh
- Parliament House, New Delhi Parliament House of India
- Old Parliament House, New Delhi
