= Ghazi Baba =

Pakistani terrorist (died 2003)

- Born: Rana Tahir Nadeem; Bahawalpur, Punjab, Pakistan
- Died: 30 August 2003; Srinagar, Jammu and Kashmir, India
- Cause of death: Killed in an encounter by Narendra Nath Dhar Dubey, Border Security Force
- Other names: Abu Jihadi, Sajid Jihadi, Shahbaz Khan, Mudasir Shahbaz, Saqlain, Abu Hijrat jihadi
- Citizenship: Pakistan
- Education: 12th
- Occupations: Terrorist, Militant leader
- Years active: 1990s–2003
- Organization(s): Jaish-e-Mohammed, Harkat-ul-Ansar
- Known for: Mastermind of the 2001 Indian Parliament attack, militant activities in Jammu and Kashmir, 1995 kidnapping of 6 foreigners, 2000 car bombings
- Title: Commander-in-Chief of Jaish-e-Mohammed
- Term: 20 years
- Predecessor: osama bin laden
- Successor: abu fazal
- Opponent: Indian Security Forces
- Criminal charges: Terrorism, murder, kidnapping, bombings
- Criminal status: Deceased (killed in operation by BSF)
- Spouse: Franky
- Children: Yes
- Father: Rana Talib Hussain

Rana Tahir Nadeem, commonly known by his nom de guerre Ghazi Baba was a Pakistani Islamic militant of Jaish-e-Mohammed and the Harkat-ul-Ansar. He was the one who allegedly masterminded the 2001 Indian Parliament attack on 13 December 2001. He was also involved in two car blasts at the Army headquarters in Srinagar on 19 April 2000 and 25 December 2000, and in the Jammu and Kashmir legislative assembly car bombing of 1 October 2001. He was also known by several aliases, including Abu Jihadi, Sajid Jihadi, Shahbaz Khan, Mudasir Shahbaz, Saqlain, and Abu Hijrat. Ghazi was also reportedly involved in the kidnapping of 6 foreigners in Pahalgam, Jammu and Kashmir in 1995. In August 2003, Ghazi Baba was killed in an operation conducted by Border Security Force (BSF) in Srinagar.

He was the commander-in-chief of Islamic terrorist group Jaish-e-Mohammed in Jammu and Kashmir. He rose to prominence in 1998 after leading an attack in the Anantnag district, during which 25 Kashmiri Pandits were killed. He had close ties with Pakistani Islamic terrorist leader Masood Azhar, who appointed him as the second-in-command of Jaish-e-Mohammed.

In the 1980s, Ghazi Baba went to Afghanistan, where he fought alongside the forces of Gulbuddin Hekmatyar. After the withdrawal of Russian forces and the collapse of the Najibullah regime, he returned to Pakistan.

== Personal life ==
Ghazi Baba was born in Bahawalpur, Punjab, Pakistan in an Urdu-speaking Muslim family. He did his schooling in Bhawalpur. His father was Rana Talib Hussain.

Ghazi Baba was married to Franky, a Kashmiri woman from Safapora village and had children. He preferred cooking his own meals. He had an interest in astrology and wore three stone rings of different colors, despite being a fundamentalist Muslim.

== See also ==
- 2001 Indian Parliament attack
- The Lover Boy of Bahawalpur
- Ground Zero (2025 film)
