= The Lover Boy of Bahawalpur =

2021 non-fiction book by Rahul Pandita

The Lover Boy of Bahawalpur: How the Pulwama Case was Cracked
- First edition
- Author: Rahul Pandita
- Language: English
- Publisher: Juggernaut Books
- Publication date: 23 June 2021
- Media type: Print (hardcover)
- Pages: 212
- ISBN: 978-9391165109

The Lover Boy of Bahawalpur: How the Pulwama Case was Cracked is a non-fiction book written by Rahul Pandita and published in 2021. The book tells the story of a team of National Investigation Agency (NIA) sleuths cracking the 2019 Pulwama attack case. The "lover boy" referred to in the title is Mohammad Umar Farooq (son of Ibrahim Athar, one of the five terrorists who had hijacked the Indian Airlines Flight IC 814 in December 1999), nephew of Jaish founder Masood Azhar and a key accused in the case. He was killed during an encounter a month after Pulwama attack. Rakesh Balwal, the Jammu and Kashmir head of the NIA was tasked with the 2019 Pulwama attack case probe at that time.

== Background ==
NIA managed to connect the dots at the time of the abrogation of Article 370 in 2019 when a mobile phone full of lustful messages was recovered after an encounter that killed Umar Farooq.

== Key people in the book ==
- Mohammad Umar Farooq, alias Idrees Bhai, nephew of Jaish-e-Mohammed founder Masood Azhar
- Adil Ahmad Dar, suicide bomber of 2019 Pulwama attack
- Sameer Ahmed Dar aka Hanjila Jihadi (cousin of Adil Ahmad Dar)
- Mohammad Ismail Alvi, alias Saifullah / Adnan / Lamboo
- Ashiq Ahmed Nengroo
- Ammar Alvi, Umar Farooq's uncle
- Noor Mohammed Tantray alias Noor Trali
- Insha Jan

== Reception ==
The Wire journalist Karan Thapar wrote of the book, "Pandita has an incredible story to tell which some may find hard to believe. Others may be sceptical [...] But there will also be many who will accept Pandita’s detailed story."

== See also ==
- Ghazi Baba
- Ground Zero
