= 2006 Srinagar bombings =

Islamic terrorist attack in Kashmir, India

- Location of attacks
- Location: 34°05′24″N 74°47′24″E; Srinagar, J&K, India
- Date: 11 July 2006; 11:40 am IST (UTC+5.30)
- Attack type: Bombings
- Weapon: Grenades
- Deaths: 8
- Injuries: 43
- Victim: Hindus
- Perpetrator: Lashkar-e-Taiba
- Motive: Islamic Terrorism

The 2006 Srinagar bombings was an Islamic terrorist attack which saw Muslim militants belonging to the Pakistan-based Lashkar-e-Taiba terrorist group carry out five grenade attacks on 11 July 2006, killing 8 people and injuring another 43, in Srinagar, in the Kashmir Valley of Jammu and Kashmir, India.

== Attacks ==
The attack took place within an hour of the departure of Prime Minister Manmohan Singh's conclusion of a two-day round table conference. The first attack occurred at 11:40 am when a grenade was thrown into a minibus carrying tourists from Bengal. Five people, died and another 10 were injured. The dead included a mother, her son and her daughter-in-law. At 12:40 pm, another grenade was lobbed at a car with a Haryana registration number. Three bystanders were injured. At 1:10 pm, another grenade was thrown at a van carrying tourists in Lal Chowk. One person died and several were injured. A child lost one of his legs in the explosion. The last grenade was thrown at a taxi stand at 3:00 pm.

== Aftermath ==
Mohammad Afzal of the Baramulla district, who allegedly threw the grenade, was caught by onlookers and handed over to the police. He confessed to being a member of Lashkar-e-Taiba. These bombings happened on the same day as 11 July 2006 Mumbai train bombings and were overshadowed by them.

== Reaction ==
UN secretary general Kofi Annan condemned both the attacks saying that "such acts cannot possibly be excused by any grievance".

== See also ==
- 2013 Srinagar attack
- 2001 Jammu and Kashmir legislative assembly attack
- 2013 CRPF camp attack at Bemina
