= Ground Zero (2025 film) =

2025 Indian film by Tejas Prabha Vijay Deoskar

- Theatrical release poster
- Directed by: Tejas Prabha Vijay Deoskar
- Written by: Sanchit Gupta; Priyadarshee Srivastava
- Based on: Operation Ghazi Baba
- Produced by: Ritesh Sidhwani; Farhan Akhtar
- Starring: Emraan Hashmi; Sai Tamhankar; Zoya Hussain
- Cinematography: Kamaljeet Negi
- Edited by: Chandrashekhar Prajapati
- Music by: Score: John Stewart Eduri; Songs: Tanishk Bagchi; Rohan-Rohan; Sunny Inder
- Production company: Excel Entertainment
- Distributed by: AA Films
- Release date: 25 April 2025
- Running time: 134 minutes
- Country: India
- Language: Hindi
- Box office: ₹9.25–10.35 crore

Ground Zero is a 2025 Indian Hindi-language action thriller film directed by Tejas Prabha Vijay Deoskar and produced by Ritesh Sidhwani and Farhan Akhtar, under Excel Entertainment. The film revolves around the story of BSF officer Narendra Nath Dhar Dubey, who led the operation in which terrorist Rana Tahir Nadeem, better known as Ghazi Baba, was killed in 2003. It stars Emraan Hashmi, Sai Tamhankar, and Zoya Hussain in the lead roles.

The film was theatrically released on 25 April 2025.

== Plot ==
Set in the early 2000s, Ground Zero follows BSF Second-in-Command (2IC) Narendra Nath Dhar Dubey (Emraan Hashmi), who is tasked with dismantling a growing terror network in Kashmir. The film opens with the rise of the “pistol gang,” a group of radicalized locals responsible for targeted killings of security personnel in Srinagar, resulting in 70 deaths. Dubey's team regularly intercepts coded radio communications from the gang, which they manage to partially decipher.

When his team deciphers a code suggesting a plan for an attack in Delhi, the 2001 Indian Parliament attack soon follows. The terrorist group Jaish-e-Mohammed, led by Ghazi Baba, claims responsibility. The Intelligence Bureau identifies Tariq Malik as a suspect linked to the attack and traces him to Srinagar. The IB arrives in Srinagar and requests the BSF's assistance in arresting him. Dubey suspects that Jaish-e-Mohammed and the pistol gang may be connected, based on the intercepted code and the fact that a Jaish-e-Mohammed terrorist is heading to Srinagar after the attack. He proposes monitoring Tariq instead of arresting him immediately, hoping Tariq will lead them to the top leadership of both groups. However, due to political pressure, the IB and Dubey's superior reject the idea. Dubey follows orders and arrests Tariq.

Continuing his investigation, Dubey learns that some pistol gang members might be from local colleges. He deploys his officers to these colleges and manages to capture one militant, Hussain, after Hussain attempts to attack him. Dubey then successfully turns Hussain into an informant. Under Dubey's instructions, Hussain leads them to Hakeem, the pistol gang's doctor, and secretly plants a voice recorder inside his medical kit. Through this recorder, Dubey overhears a conversation between Hakeem and his superior—who turns out to be Ghazi Baba. Ghazi Baba is currently in Srinagar and discussing another planned attack in Delhi. Realizing this is a rare chance, Dubey attempts to apprehend Ghazi Baba without backup, but Ghazi Baba realizes what is happening, kills Hakeem, and escapes.

Dubey brings his findings to the IB in Delhi, but the IB director dismisses the information, citing intelligence reports claiming Ghazi Baba is in Pakistan. However, IB officer Aadila (Zoya Hussain) believes Dubey and orders a full-scale search in Delhi, hoping to prevent the attack—only to be shocked when the attack occurs instead in Gandhinagar.

Facing nationwide outrage, the Indian government attempts to restore public confidence when the Prime Minister announces he will visit Kashmir. Jaish-e-Mohammed plans an assassination attempt during the visit, which security forces anticipate. Dubey is assigned to lead the PM's security detail.

During the PM's visit, the convoy is ambushed by Jaish-e-Mohammed. A car rams into the convoy and its occupants open fire, killing several officers. Dubey's team protects the PM and captures one terrorist alive. During interrogation, the terrorist claims he is a sewer worker coerced by Jaish-e-Mohammed and knows nothing about the group. Dubey notices inconsistencies and calls out his lies. The terrorist then confesses, confirming Dubey's earlier intelligence: the original plan was an attack in Delhi, but once the leak was detected, they shifted the operation to the temple in Kashmir. He also reveals the location of Ghazi Baba's wife.

Dubey's team tracks Ghazi Baba's wife and discovers the group's hideout. Dubey requests permission from his superior to raid the building, but the request is denied because only Ghazi Baba's wife—not Ghazi Baba himself—has been seen there, and the building is in a sensitive residential area. That night, Dubey and two of his officers, Binu and Praveen, defy orders and launch the raid. A fierce crossfire erupts. Ghazi Baba is indeed present. Praveen is killed in the gunfight. Despite being gravely injured, Dubey manages to kill Ghazi Baba.

== Cast ==
- Emraan Hashmi as Second-in-Command of BSF Narendra Nath Dhar Dubey
- Sai Tamhankar as Jaya Dubey
- Zoya Hussain as Aadila, an IB officer
- Mukesh Tiwari as Sanjiv Sharma, Commandant of BSF
- Deepak Paramesh as Binu Ramchandra, Deputy Commandant of BSF
- Lalit Prabhakar as Praveen, Assistant Commandant of BSF
- Rockey Raina as Ghazi Baba
- Rahul Vohra as Dhyaan
- Hanan Baba as Ahmed
- Mir Mehrooz as Husain, informant of N.N.D Dubey
- Aeklavya Tomer as Chand Khan
- Qazi Faiz as Hakeem
- Ram Avatar as PM Atal Bihari Vajpayee
- Punit Tiwari as Tariq Malik
- Imran Farooq as ACP Hamid (J&K)
- Syed Aqib Shah as Ansar
- Krishna Sharma as Rishi
- Abhay Dheeraj Singh as Amanpreet
- Satya Prakash as Ranjan

== Production ==
Emraan Hashmi wrapped up shooting for the film on 22 November 2022.

=== Filming ===
Principal photography took place in Jammu and Kashmir.

== Promotion ==
A special screening of the film Ground Zero was hosted for BSF Jawans in Srinagar in April 2025.

== Soundtrack ==
Ground Zero

Soundtrack album by Tanishk Bagchi, Rohan-Rohan and Sunny Inder
- Released: 18 April 2025
- Recorded: 2024–2025
- Genre: Feature film soundtrack
- Length: 12:42
- Language: Hindi
- Label: Zee Music Company
- Producers: Ritesh Sidhwani; Farhan Akhtar
External audio
- Ground Zero - Full Album on YouTube

The music of the film is composed by Tanishk Bagchi, Rohan-Rohan and Sunny Inder while lyrics are written by Vayu, Rashmi Virag, Kumaar and Irshad Kamil.

No.	Title	Lyrics	Music	Singer(s)	Length
1.	"So Lene De"	Vayu	Tanishk Bagchi	Jubin Nautiyal, Afsana Khan	3:14
2.	"Lahoo"	Rashmi Virag	Tanishk Bagchi	Sonu Nigam	2:44
3.	"Fateh"	Kumaar	Sunny Inder	Divya Kumar	2:54
4.	"Pehli Dafa"	Irshad Kamil	Rohan-Rohan	Vishal Mishra	3:50
Total length:					12:42

== Release ==
=== Theatrical ===
The film was theatrically released on 25 April 2025.

=== Home media ===
The film's digital streaming rights were acquired by Amazon Prime Video. The film began streaming on the platform from 20 June 2025.

== Reception ==
Shubhra Gupta of The Indian Express rated 2.5/5 stars and said that "Emraan Hashmi does a good job of playing a BSF officer on the hunt for dreaded terrorist Ghazi Baba. He tones down the dialoguing and makes it sound conversational. But tighter would have been better." Dhaval Roy of The Times of India gave 3.5 stars out of 5 and writes that "Ground Zero does not rely on high-octane theatrics but packs in ample thrills, making it an engaging and impactful watch." Mayur Sanap of Rediff.com gave 2 stars out of 5 and observed that "Ground Zero is a respectful biopic but a story like this needed more heart to make an actual impact".

Shilajit Mitra of The Hindu write in his review that "‘Ground Zero’ wants to tackle thorny questions about security in Kashmir, while also playing by the book of the Hindi combat film". Hardika Gupta of NDTV gave 3 stars out of 5 and said that "Despite its few shortcomings, it is an incredibly relevant and timely film". Rishabh Suri of Hindustan Times rated 3/5 stars and said that "Overall, Ground Zero is a well-made film that has arrived at the right time. It thankfully steers away from chest-thumping jingoism, and that is a relief."

Rahul Desai of The Hollywood Reporter India writes in his review that "As an action thriller, Ground Zero is mostly engaging. The final raid is intense, if a little too Zero Dark Thirty-coded. The film goes out of its way to establish Dubey as a large-hearted maverick." Uday Bhatia of Mint commented that ""‘Ground Zero’ is sober and sympathetic to a degree. But its view of Kashmir is ultimately blinkered and reductive." Devesh Sharma of Filmfare rated 3.5/5 stars and said that "Ground Zero is a gritty portrayal about what it takes to be a BSF personnel stationed in Kashmir. Emraan Hashmi essays the lead role realistically." Ganesh Aaglave of Firstpost rated 3/5 stars and writes in his review that "On the whole, Ground Zero deserves to be watched as a tribute to the unsung hero BSF officer Narendra Nath Dhar Dubey."
