= March 2013 Srinagar attack =

Militant attack in India

2013 Srinagar Attack
- Location of attack
- Location: 34°4′24″N 74°45′57″E; Bemina, Srinagar, Jammu and Kashmir, India
- Date: 13 March 2013; 10:45 a.m. UTC+5:30 (IST)
- Attack type: Bombings, shootings
- Weapons: Grenades; Two AK-47 assault rifles; Two pistols
- Deaths: 7 (including the two perpetrators)
- Injuries: 10
- No. of participants: 2
- Defender: CRPF

An attack on a Central Reserve Police Force camp at Bemina, Srinagar, Jammu and Kashmir, India, occurred on 13 March 2013. It resulted in the death of five CRPF personnel and two attackers. Ten others were also injured include security personnels and civilians.

== Attack ==
Two attackers entered Police Public School ground, where the CRPF camp was situated, in the morning. They were in the attire of cricket players with the sports kit. After they passed through security, they removed their jackets and took out grenades and AK-47 assault rifles. The two suicide bombers opened indiscriminate firing on the CRPF camp. The shootout lasted 30 minutes.

Five CRPF men died and ten others were injured, including four civilians. The perpetrators were both killed by the CRPF personnel. Two AK-47 rifles, five magazines, two pistols and four grenades were recovered from attackers. A curfew was then imposed in Kashmir.

== Aftermath ==
The separatist group Hizbul Mujahideen claimed responsibility for the attack.

== Investigation ==
Two militants were arrested by Jammu and Kashmir police from Baramullah, Srinagar on 14 March 2013. Third suspect was arrested two days later who allegedly provide shelter to attackers.

== Responsibility ==
NDTV suggested Hizbul Mujahideen was responsible for attack. Involvement of Lashkar-e-Taiba suspected.

== Reactions ==
=== Domestic ===
The Government of India suspected the possible involvement of Pakistan. Sushilkumar Shinde, the home minister of India, said that the attackers who were killed had items (including ointment) that were manufactured in Pakistan and diaries with numbers in them of Pakistani origin. The Tamil Nadu government declared a relief of Rs500,000 to the family of a CRPF man who died in the attack. Omar Abdullah, the Chief Minister of Jammu and Kashmir, paid tribute to the dead soldiers. Later the India-Pakistan hockey series was cancelled. India also put the group visa facility for Pakistani tourists on hold.

=== International ===
- Pakistan - The Ministry of Foreign Affairs denied any involvement of Pakistan in the attack.

== See also ==
- June 2013 Srinagar attack
- 2006 Srinagar bombings
- 2001 Jammu and Kashmir legislative assembly attack
