= Narendra Nath Dhar Dubey =

Indian Border Security Force officer

Narendra Nath Dhar Dubey KC

DIG of Border Security Force

Personal details
- Born: Gorakhpur, uttarpradesh
- Police career
- Allegiance: India
- Department: Border Security Force
- Rank: DIG
- Awards: Kirti Chakra

Narendra Nath Dhar Dubey is a former Deputy Inspector General (DIG) of the Border Security Force (BSF). He is noted for his role during the insurgency in Kashmir, including leading a 2003 operation in which Ghazi Baba, linked to the 2001 Indian Parliament attack, was killed. His actions have been referenced in connection with the 2025 film Ground Zero.

For his leadership during the operation, he was awarded India's second highest gallantry award Kirti Chakra in 2005.

== Military career ==
Dubey served as a Deputy Inspector General in the Border Security Force.

=== Ghazi Baba operation ===
In the early 2000s, Dubey was posted in Kashmir. He and his team spent two years tracking Ghazi Baba, culminating in an operation in which the militant was killed.
