= Chamber of Princes =

Institution of the rulers of the princely states of India

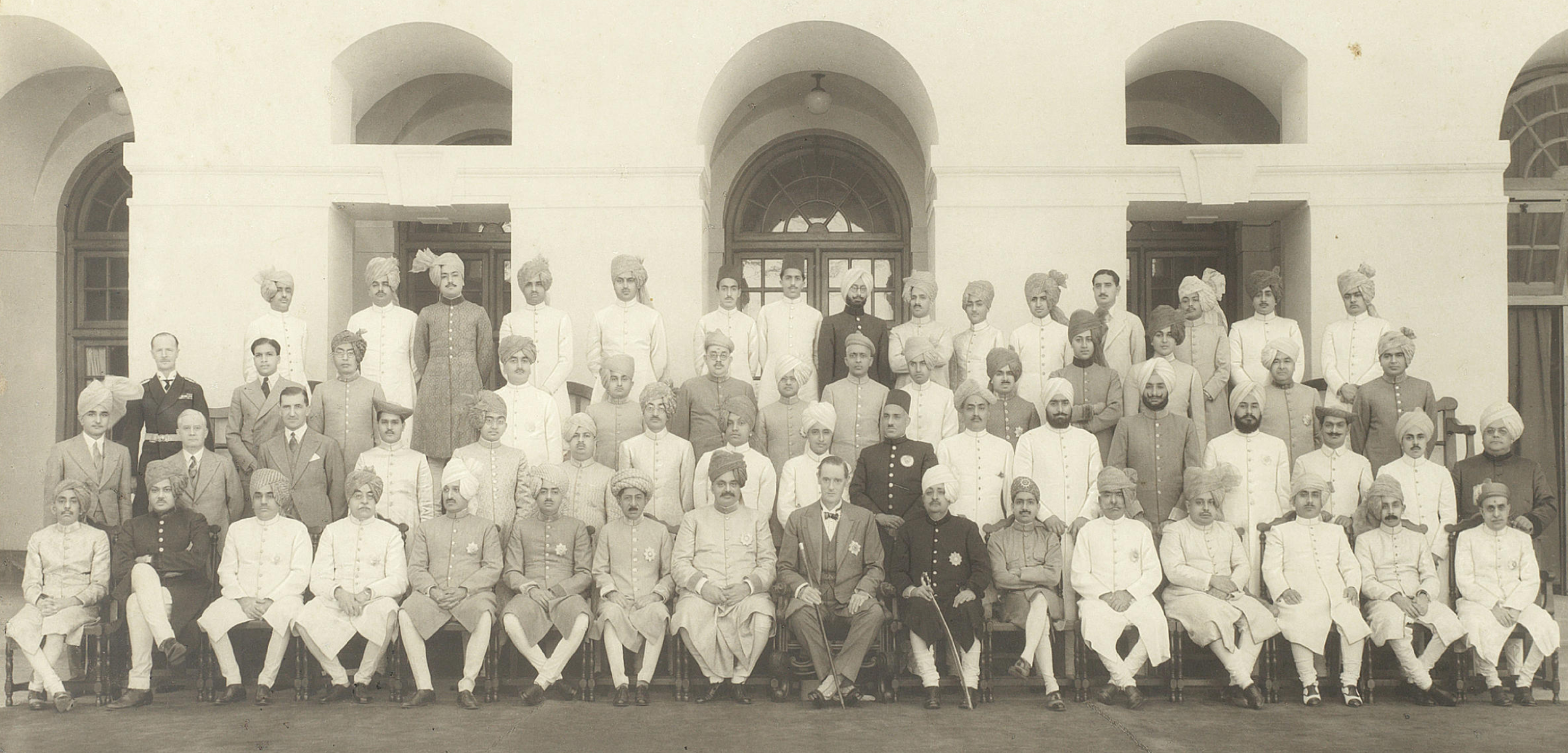
Chamber of Princes meeting in March 1941

The Chamber of Princes (Narendra Mandal) was an institution established in 1920 by a royal proclamation of King-Emperor George V to provide a forum in which the pro-British rulers of the princely states of India could voice their needs and aspirations to the colonial government of British India. It survived until 1947.

== Overview ==
The Chamber of Princes was established in 1920, by King-Emperor George V's proclamation on 23 December 1919, after the Government of India Act 1919 was given royal assent. The creation of the chamber followed the abandonment by the British of their long-established policy of isolating the Indian rulers from each other and also from the rest of the world.

The Chamber first met on 8 February 1921 and initially consisted of 120 members. Of those, 108 from the more significant states were members in their own right, while the remaining twelve seats were for the representation of a further 127 states. That left 327 minor states, which were unrepresented. Also, some of the more important rulers like the Maratha-ruled states of Baroda State, Gwalior State and Indore State declined to join it .

The Chamber of Princes usually met only once a year, with the Viceroy of India presiding, but it appointed a Standing Committee which met more often. The full Chamber elected from its princely ranks a permanent officer styled the Chancellor, who chaired the Standing Committee.

The chamber convened at the Parliament House. Today the hall is used as the parliament's library.

== Concerns about post-independence constitution ==
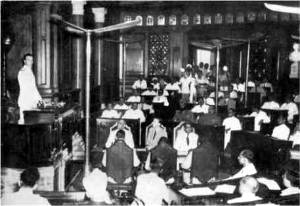
Lord Mountbatten addressing the Chamber of Princes as Crown Representative in the 1940s

On 12 March 1940, the Chamber resolved:

The Chamber of Princes, while welcoming the attainment by India of its due place among the Dominions of the British Commonwealth under the British Crown, records its emphatic and firm view that, in any future constitution for India, the essential guarantees and safeguards for the preservation of the sovereignty and autonomy of the States and for the protection of their rights and interests arising from treaties, and engagements and sanads or otherwise, should be effectively provided and that any unit should not be placed in a position to dominate the others or to interfere with the rights and safeguards guaranteed to them, and that all parties must be ensured their due share and fair play; And that, in any negotiations for formulating a constitution for India, whether independently of the Government of India Act 1935, or by revision of that Act, representatives of the States and of this Chamber should have a voice proportionate to their importance and historical position.

== Chancellors ==
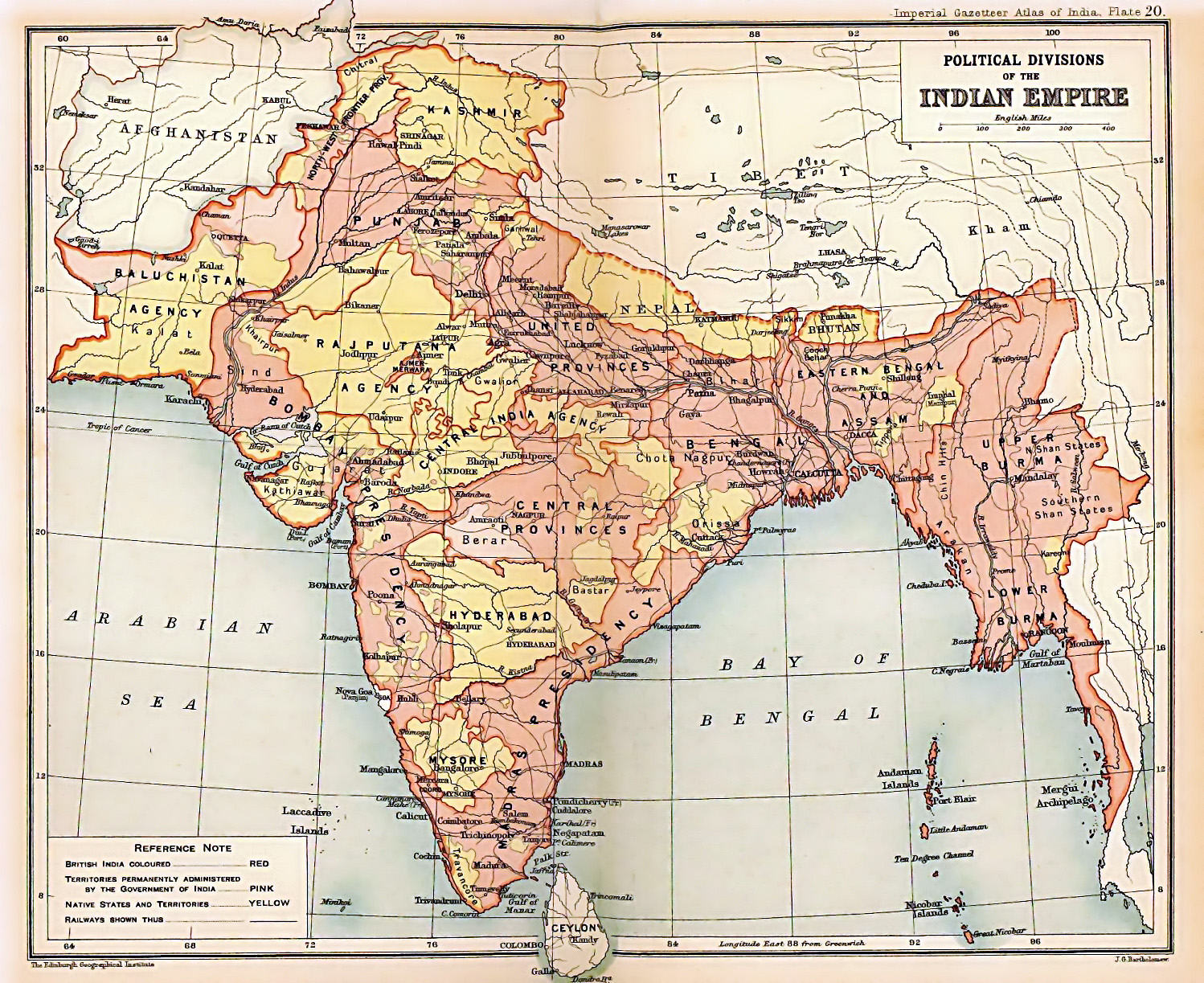
Map of British-ruled India with the princely states coloured in yellow

Name	Title	Tenure
Major-General Sir Ganga Singh	Maharaja of Bikaner State	1921–1926
Adhiraj Major-General Sir Bhupinder Singh	Maharaja of Patiala State	1926–1931
Colonel Sir K.S. Ranjitsinhji	Maharaja of Nawanagar State	1931–1933
Colonel Sir K.S. Digvijaysinhji	Maharaja of Nawanagar State	1933–1943
Yadavindra Singh	Maharaja of Patiala State	1943–1944
Major-General Sir Hamidullah Khan	Nawab of Bhopal State	1944–1947

== See also ==
- Durbar (court)
- List of Indian princely states
- Salute state
