= Old Parliament House, New Delhi =

Former Indian legislative building

Old Parliament House
- Samvidhan Sadan (Constitution House)
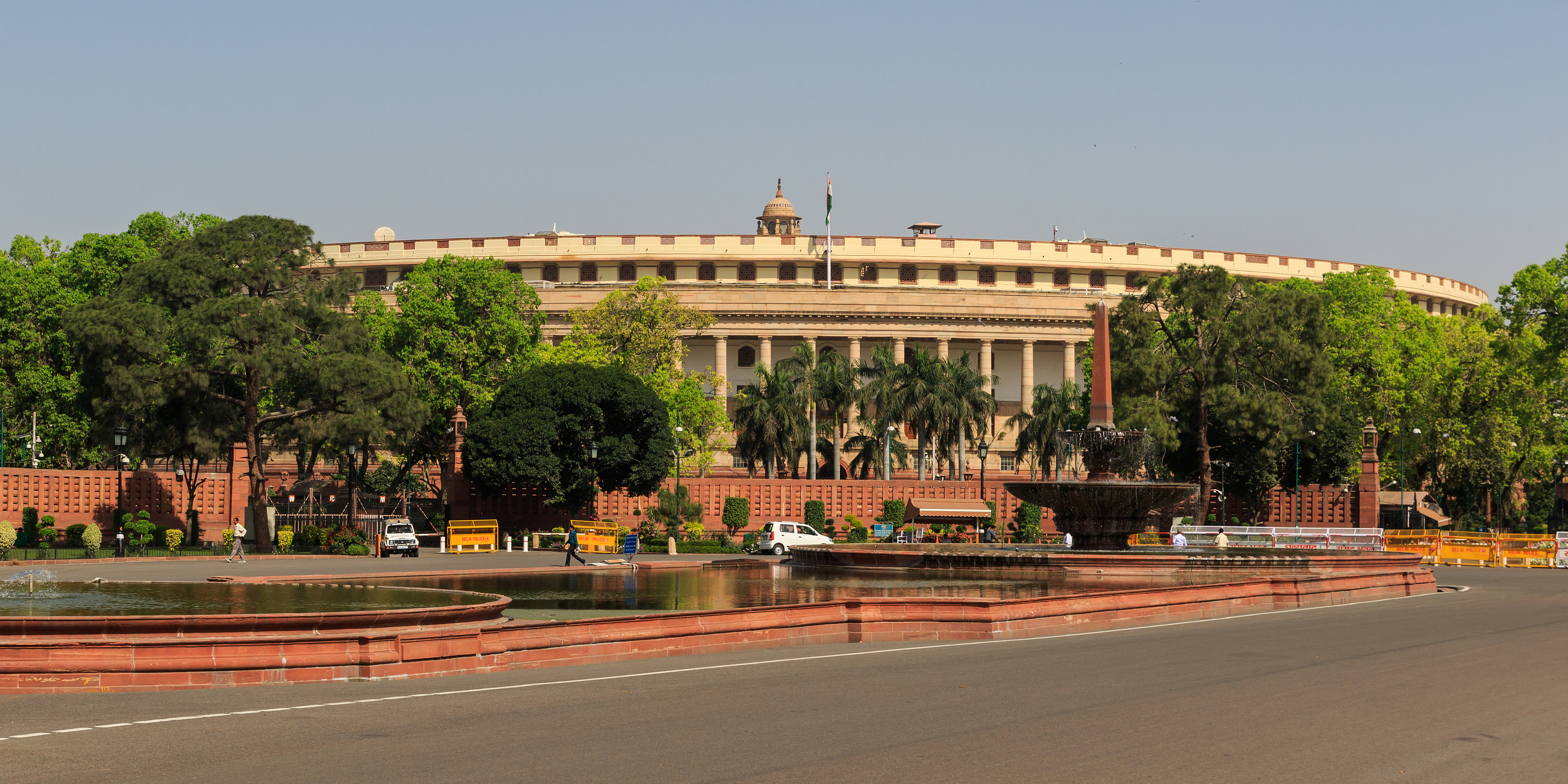
- Old Parliament House as seen from Rajpath

- Location within Delhi
- Former names: Parliament House; Council House

General information
- Status: Retired and under restoration
- Type: Heritage
- Architectural style: Classical and Indian
- Location: Sansad Marg, New Delhi, India
- Coordinates: 28.6172°N 77.2081°E
- Groundbreaking: 12 February 1921
- Opened: 18 January 1927
- Owner: Government of India

Design and construction
- Architects: Edwin Lutyens; Herbert Baker

Other information
- Public transit: Central Secretariat

The Old Parliament House, officially known as the Samvidhan Sadan (Constitution House) and formerly known as the Council House, was the seat of the Parliament of India between 26 January 1950 and 18 September 2023. It housed the Lok Sabha and the Rajya Sabha (the lower and upper houses) respectively in India's bicameral parliament for nearly 73 years. Earlier it had served as the seat of the Imperial Legislative Council between 18 January 1927 and 15 August 1947, and the Constituent Assembly of India between 15 August 1947 and 26 January 1950.

The building was designed by British architects Edwin Lutyens and Herbert Baker and was constructed between 1921 and 1927. It was opened in January 1927 as the seat of the Imperial Legislative Council. Following the Indian Independence in 1947, it was taken over by the Constituent Assembly of India, and then became the seat of the Indian Parliament on 26 January 1950 with India becoming a republic following the adoption of the Indian Constitution.

A new Parliament House built adjacent to this building was inaugurated on 28 May 2023, replacing the old Parliament building.

== Early history ==
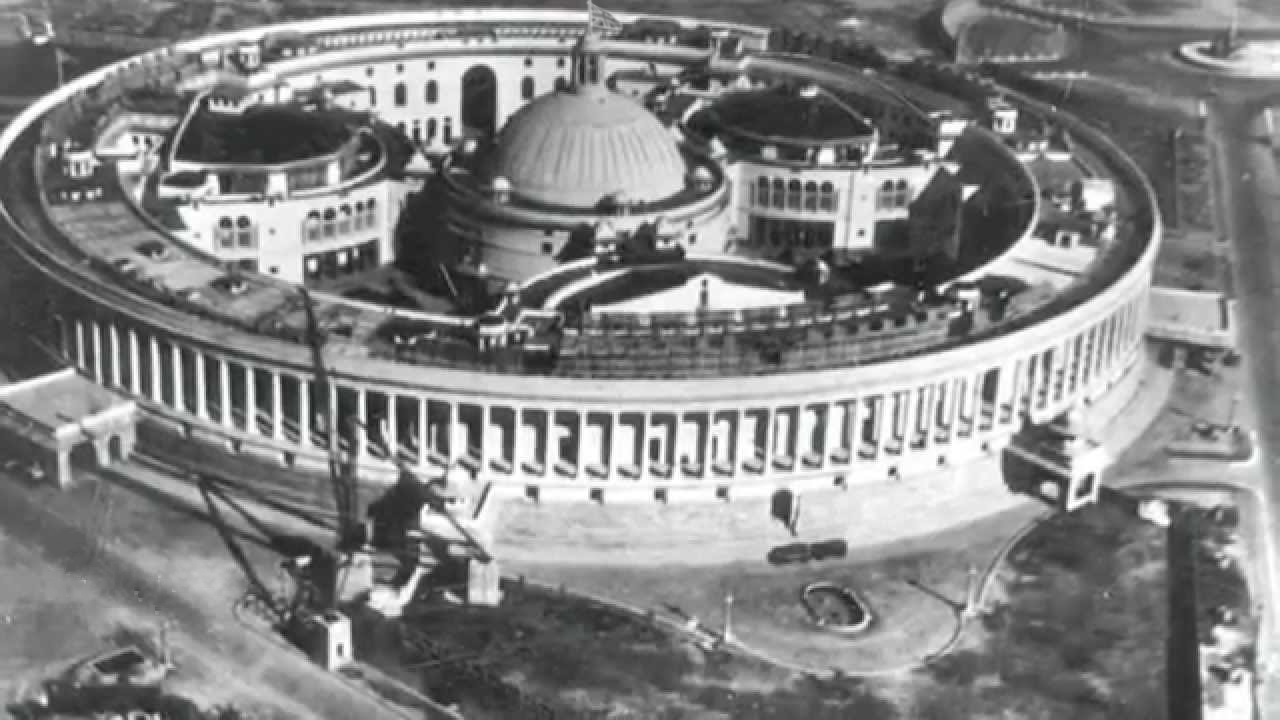
The Council House, during the final phase of its construction, in 1926.

=== Background ===
During the coronation of George V as the Emperor of India on 12 December 1911, he announced the transfer of the seat of the colonial government from Calcutta to Delhi. In 1919, the Montagu–Chelmsford Reforms transformed the Imperial Legislative Council into a bicameral structure with two houses, those being the Central Legislative Assembly and Council of State. The reforms necessitated the construction of the building to accommodate the houses.

=== Planning and design ===
The building was designed by English architects Edwin Lutyens and Herbert Baker. Lutyens proposed a circular design for the new building, which he believed would be the most efficient given the triangular shape of the plot of land on which the building is located. The circular design was also chosen due to its reminiscence to the Roman Colosseum.

The architectural style of the structure is an amalgamation of classical architecture, inspired from Greece and Rome, alongside structural elements and decorative motifs from Indian architecture. Lutyens believed that there was no "real Indian architecture or any great tradition." In his view, even picturesque structures of the subcontinent were supposedly pervaded by a "childish ignorance" of basic architectural principles. However, Baker supported a blend of classical and Indian architecture, in what was termed "orientalised" classicism.

Before the project commenced, Baker, encouraged by Lord Hardinge, and often accompanied by Lutyens, visited ancient cities in northern and central British India, from Lahore to Bodh Gaya, in an effort, as Baker put it, "to learn all that I could of India." Baker sought to take the region's climate and cultural heritage into consideration, when designing the blueprint of the building. Following his tour, several "distinctly Indian" architectural practices appealed to him. Furthermore, Hardinge also pressed Lutyens and Baker to adopt Indian elements such as chhatri (dome-shaped pavilion) and chhajja (overhanging eave or roof). However, Baker was also concerned with the political implications that the design would elicit. As he wrote, the architecture "must not be Indian, nor English, nor Roman, but it must be imperial."

=== Construction ===
The foundation stone was laid by Prince Arthur, Duke of Connaught and Strathearn, on 12 February 1921. The building consisted of 144 sandstone columns on the exterior. At the core was the circular central chamber, and which was surrounded by three semicircular halls, for the sessions of the Chamber of Princes, the Council of State, and the Central Legislative Assembly. The structure was surrounded by expansive gardens, and its perimeter enclosed by jali (latticed sandstone railings). About 2,500 stone cutters and masons were employed to shape the stones and marbles required for construction. The structure was built over a period of six years, beginning in 1921 and finishing in 1927.

=== Inauguration ===
On 18 January 1927, Bhupendra Nath Mitra, a member of the governor-general's executive council, in charge of the department of industries and labour, invited Lord Irwin, then viceroy and governor-general of India, to inaugurate the building.

== As the Council House ==
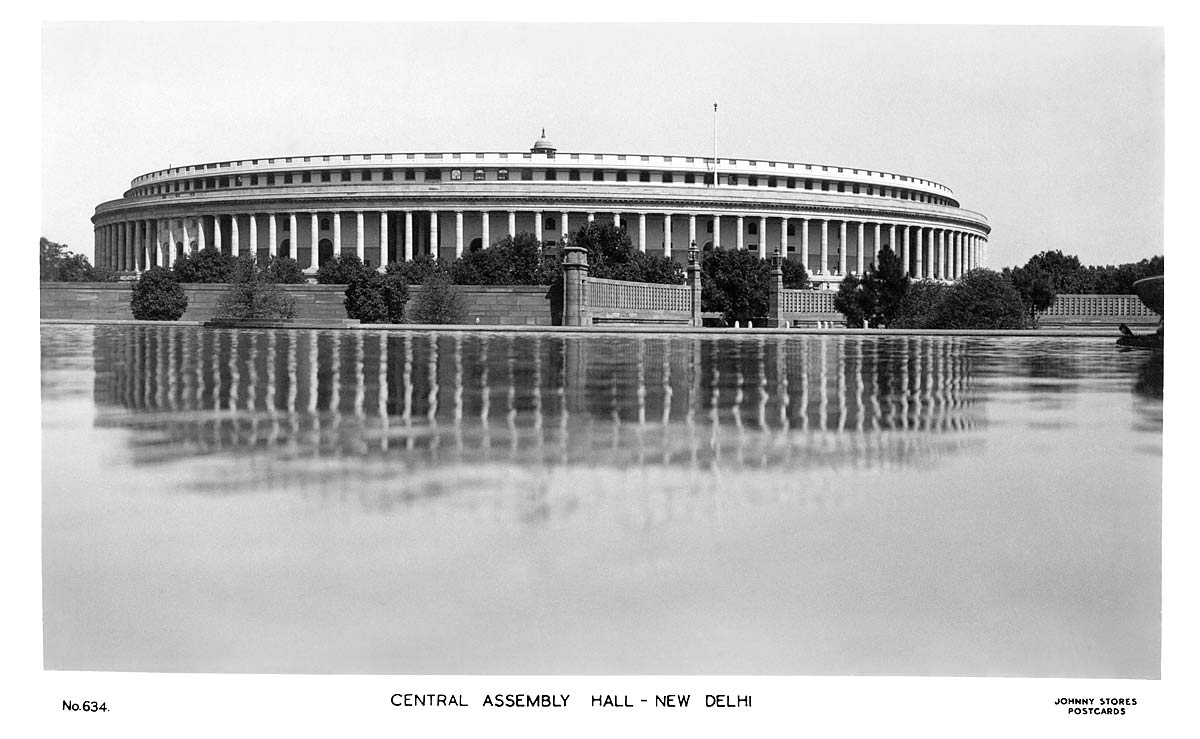
The Council House in 1927.

The third session of the Central Legislative Assembly was held in the new building on 19 January 1927, a day after its inauguration. Named the Council House, the building acted as the seat of the Imperial Legislative Council, from its inauguration in 1927 till Indian independence in 1947.

=== 1929 bombing ===
On 8 April 1929, Bhagat Singh, an Indian anti-colonial revolutionary, affiliated with the Hindustan Socialist Republican Association (HSRA), bombed the Council House, with the help of Batukeshwar Dutt. The bombing was conducted as a protest against the Public Safety Bill and the Trade Dispute Bill, which had been rejected by the Central Legislative Assembly, but enacted by the viceroy due to the latter's special powers. Following the bombing, the men chanted "Inquilab Zindabad!" ("Long Live the Revolution!") and threw leaflets. They were subsequently arrested.

== As the Parliament House ==
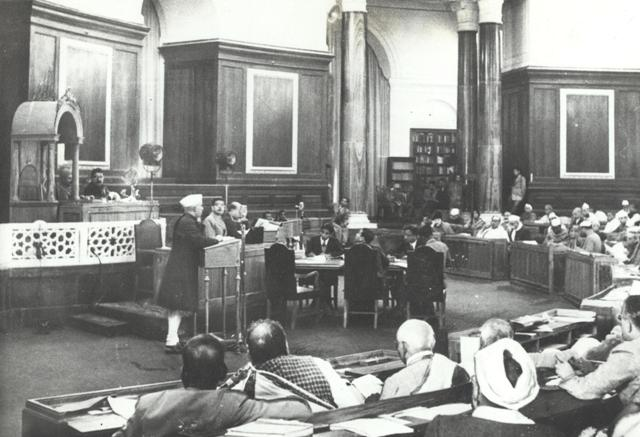
Jawaharlal Nehru addressing the Constituent Assembly in 1946.

After India gained independence from the British Raj on 15 August 1947, the building served as the seat of the Constituent Assembly of India, tasked with creating the Constitution of India. When the Constitution came into effect on 26 January 1950, the building became the seat of the Parliament of India. The building was renamed to Parliament House, officially known as Sansad Bhavan. In 1956, Baker led the addition of two new floors to the structure, due to a demand for more space.

=== 2001 attack ===
On 13 December 2001, five militants from Lashkar-e-Taiba and Jaish-e-Mohammed, two Pakistan-based militant organisations, attempted to invade the Parliament House. They were killed outside the building in a firefight with the security forces. The attack resulted in the deaths of six Delhi Police personnel, two Parliament Security Services personnel, and a gardener. The attack increased tensions between India and Pakistan, resulting in the 2001–2002 India–Pakistan standoff.

=== New Parliament House ===
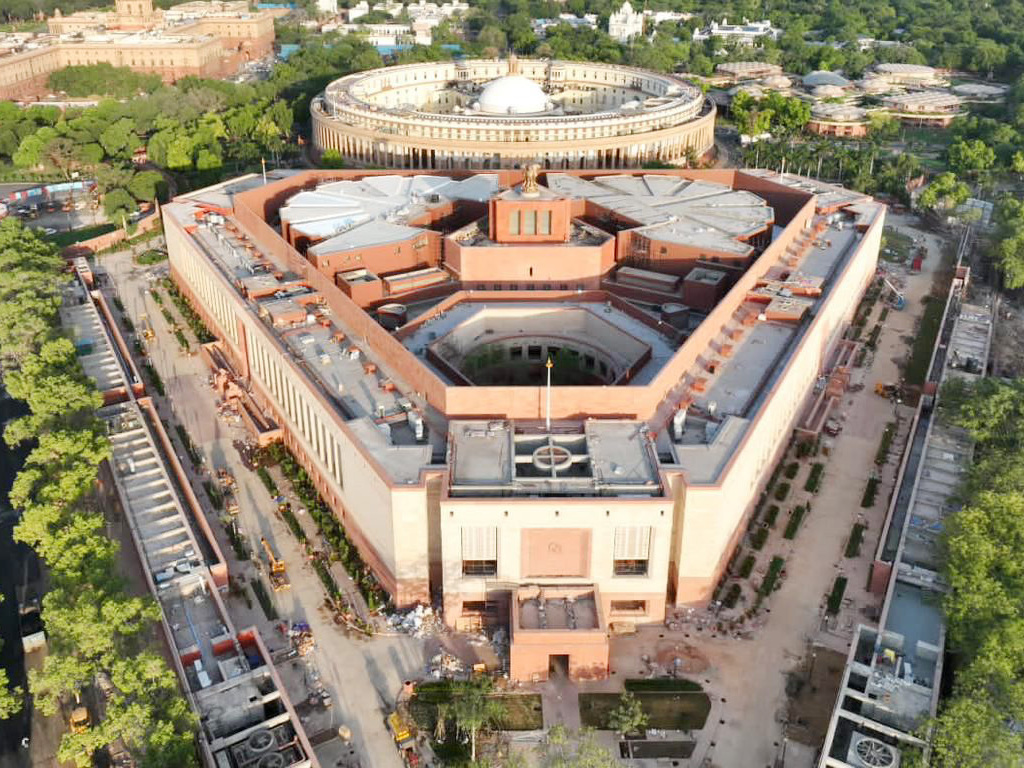
View of the New Parliament House with the Old Parliament House in the background

Proposal for a new parliament building to replace the existing complex emerged in the 2010s due to ageing of the old building and space constraints. A committee to suggest alternatives to the current building was set up by the then speaker of the Lok Sabha Meira Kumar in 2012. In 2019, the Indian government launched the Central Vista Redevelopment Project, which aimed at redeveloping the area around the Central Vista, the major administrative area in New Delhi. The project included a plan to construct a new parliament building at plot number 118 of the Parliament Estate in Rafi Marg. The construction of the entire project was completed on 20 May 2023. On 28 May 2023, Indian prime minister Narendra Modi officially opened the new parliament building, On 19 September 2023, the first house proceedings at the new building commenced as a part of a special session of the parliament.

== As the Constitution House ==
In a speech held on 19 September 2023, prime minister Modi proposed that the building be renamed Samvidhan Sadan ("Constitution House"), and Om Birla, Speaker of the Lok Sabha, announced later that day that it had been renamed so. After the inauguration of the new Parliament House, the Old Parliament House was proposed to be retrofitted to provide space for government events and host the proposed "Museum of Democracy". In January 2026, Lok Sabha speaker Om Birla stated that experts have been invited to provide suggestions regarding the use of the building, and the final decision would be taken later at the general body meeting of the Lok Sabha.

== Gallery ==
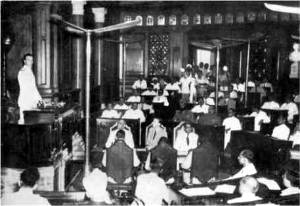
Mountbatten addressing the Chamber of Princes as viceroy and governor-general of India in 1947.

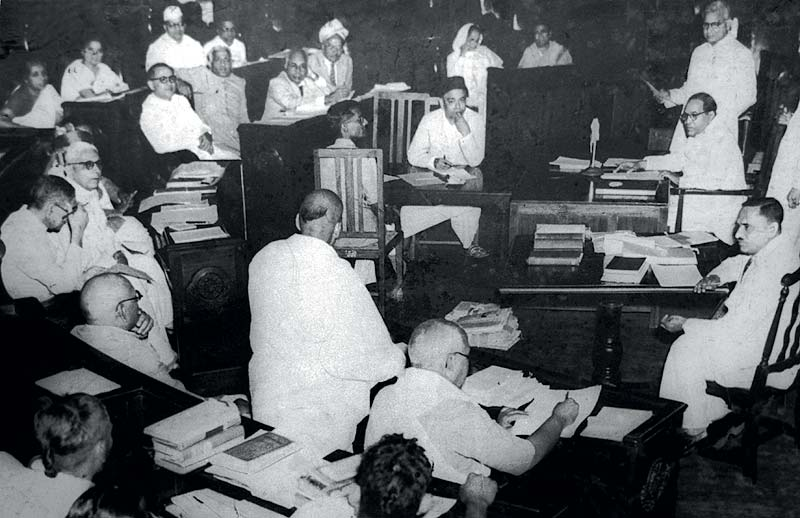
A Constituent Assembly of India meeting in 1950.

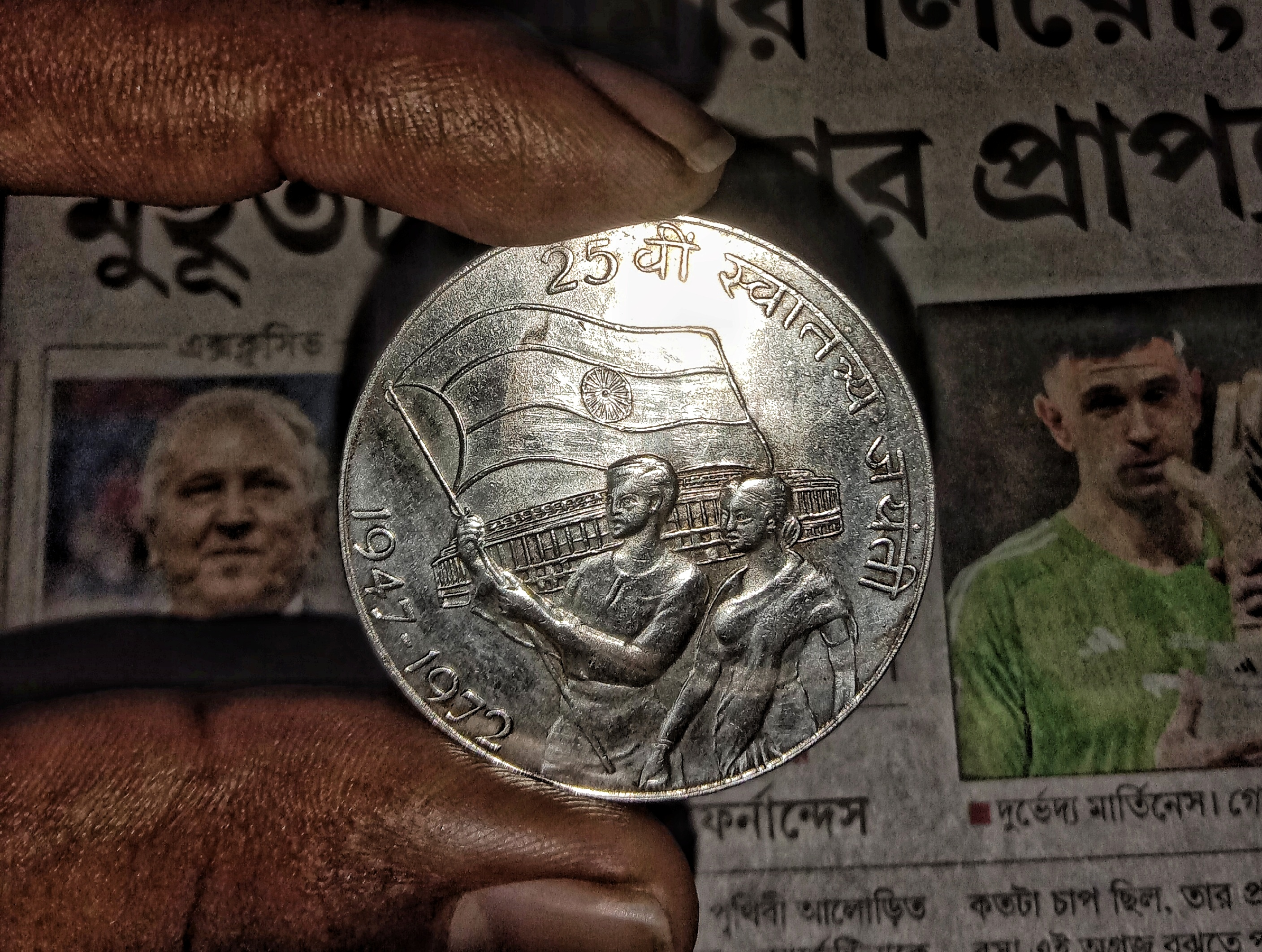
The Old Parliament House building depicted on the obverse of the 10 Rupees silver coin of 1972, commemorating the 25th Anniversary of Independence (1947—1972).

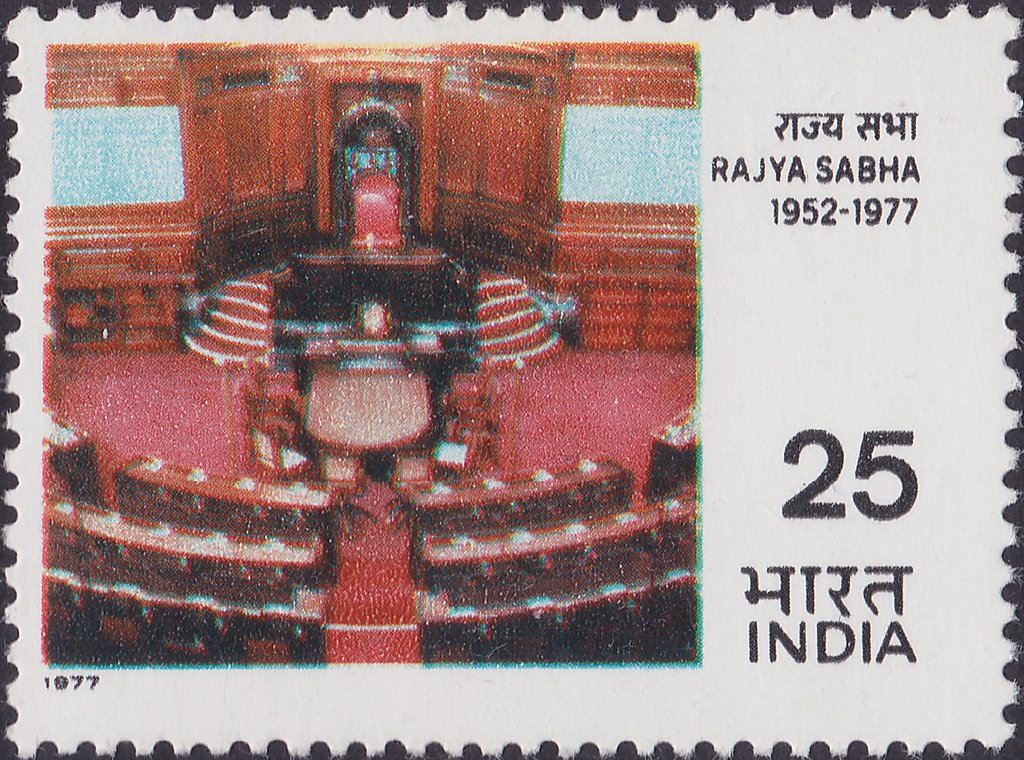
A 1977 India Post stamp showing the Rajya Sabha chamber.

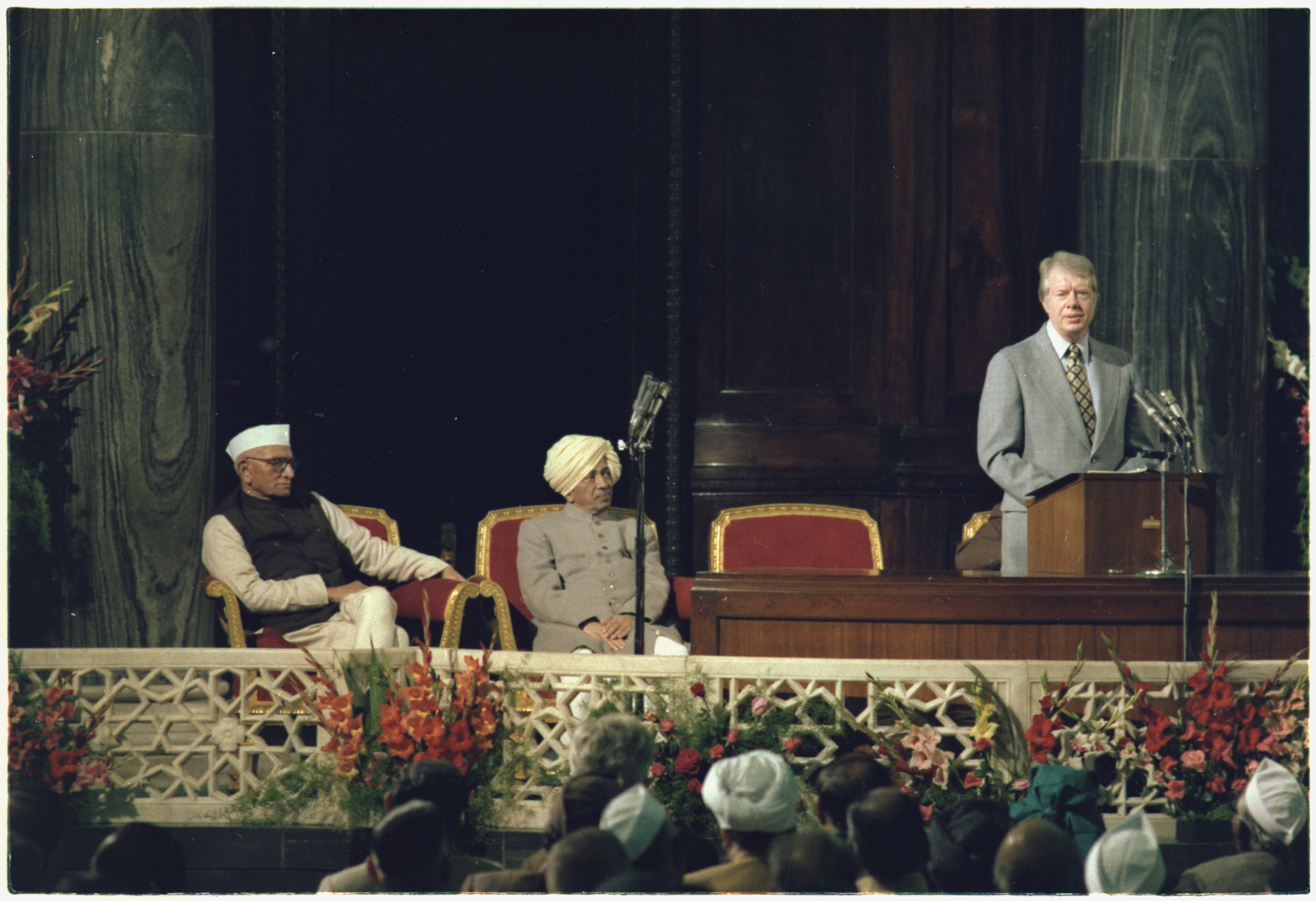
Indian Prime Minister Morarji Desai listens to U.S. President Jimmy Carter addressing the Indian Parliament in 1978.

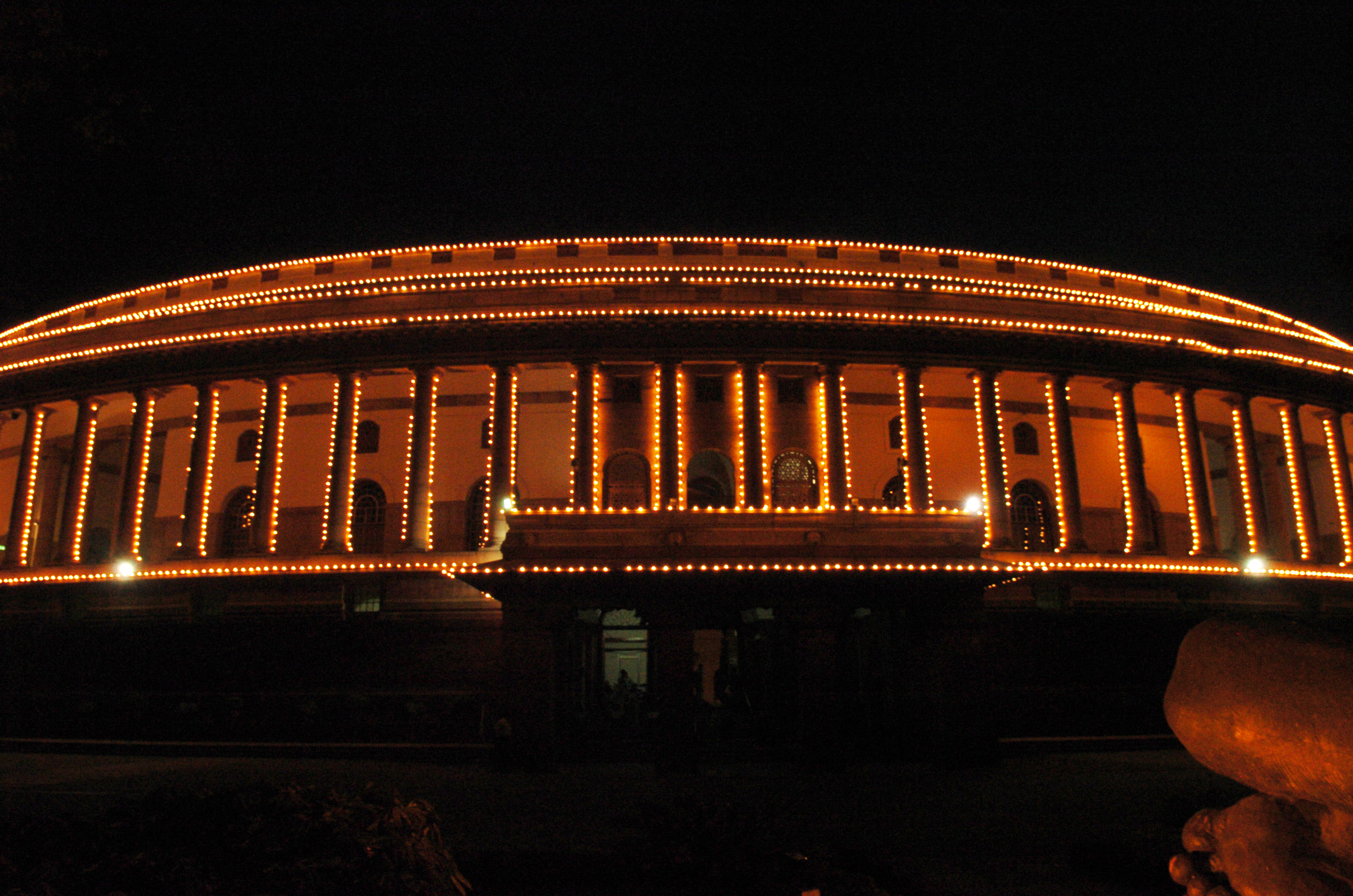
The Old Parliament House, illuminated for the 61st Indian independence day on 15 August 2007.

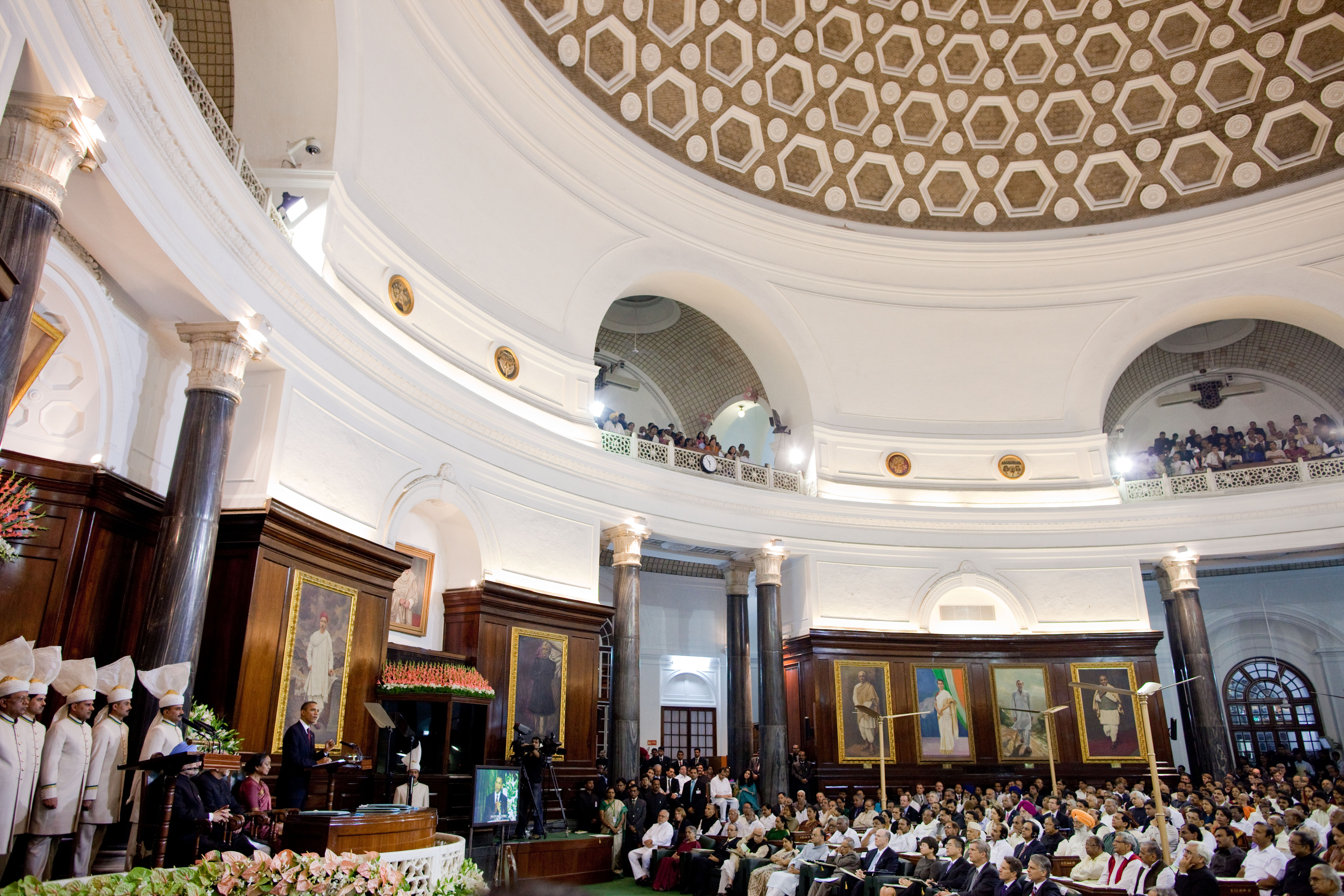
U.S. President Barack Obama addresses the Parliament of India at the Central Hall in 2010

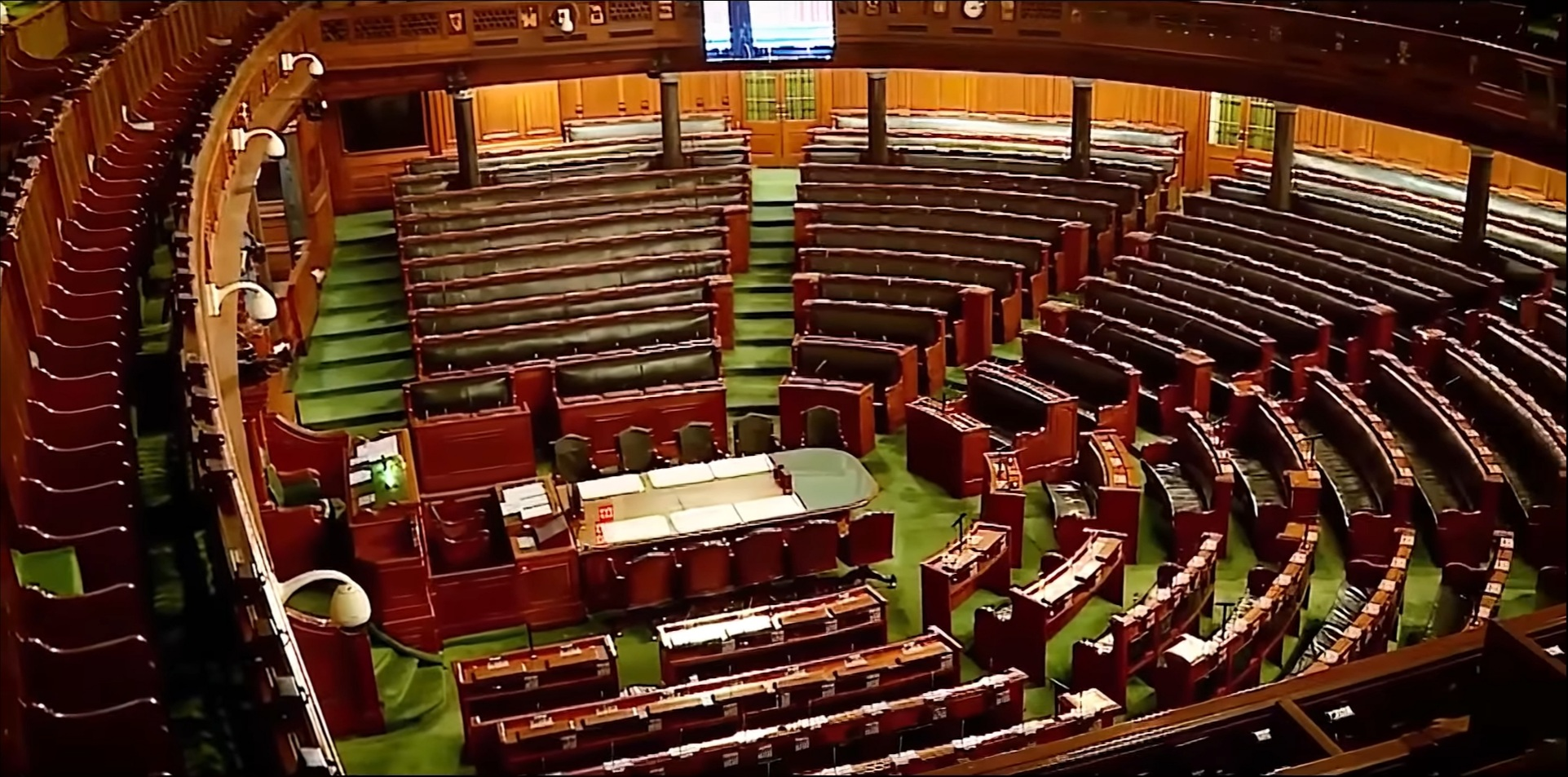
Lok Sabha chamber in 2020

== See also ==
- Lutyens' Delhi
- Parliament House, New Delhi
