= 2023 Indian Parliament breach =

- Location: 28.6176°N 77.2098°E
- Date: 13 December 2023; Around 1 PM (UTC+5:30)
- Weapon: Smoke bomb
- No. of participants: 6
- Defenders: Hanuman Beniwal and fellow MPs

On 13 December 2023, two intruders entered the Lok Sabha chamber of the Indian Parliament from the public gallery. One of the individuals jumped onto the tables where the Members of Parliament (MPs) were seated and released a yellow-coloured smoke canister. The other individuals named Amol Shinde and Neelam Devi chanted slogans. This caused chaos and panic within the House, leading to the immediate adjournment of the session. Outside the building, two other individuals were arrested for doing similar activities.

During this incident around hundred leaders including Leader of Opposition Rahul Gandhi and Defence Minister Rajnath Singh were present in the House.

Rashtriya Loktantrik Party founder and MP Hanuman Beniwal along with some other MPs caught and overpowered the intruders. Beniwal told the media soon after - “Herogiri unki utar di, [trans. curbed their [self-assumed] heroism]”. Beniwal soon after incident questioned BJP government on national security and called it a ‘big security lapse’ and demanded a thorough investigation. He also highlighted the timing, coinciding with the 22nd anniversary of the 2001 Indian Parliament attack.

The breach later led to the suspension of 146 opposition parliament members on claims of causing disorder, 95 from the Lok Sabha, and 46 from the Rajya Sabha. The suspensions were later condemned by Human Rights Watch.

== Background ==
The incident occurred at about 1 PM in the Lok Sabha, the lower house of the Indian Parliament, in the New Parliament House. It happened on the 22nd anniversary of the 2001 Indian Parliament attack. Following the incident, four individuals were arrested. Two were detained from the Parliament complex, while the other two were apprehended near Transport Bhavan, which is adjacent to the Parliament. Investigations revealed that the smoke released by the individuals was not harmful and was intended to cause a sensation.

Congress MP Gurjeet Singh Aujla from Amritsar snatched the smoke canister from one of the intruders and ran to the exit of the parliament to throw it away. He told The Indian Express that at the time, he believed the canister was a bomb. During the interview, he also told The Indian Express that: "A Punjabi never runs away from danger."

The incident sparked widespread condemnation and raised serious questions about the security of the Parliament complex. Lok Sabha speaker Om Birla organised a meeting with the MPs to review the security arrangements and implement stricter measures to prevent such incidents from happening again.

In a separate incident two protestors deployed smoke bombs and chanted slogans while being taken away from area near the parliament by Delhi Police.

== Aftermath ==
Both the Lok Sabha and Rajya Sabha were adjourned initially, but proceedings were resumed after a while. The speaker of the Lok Sabha banned the issuance of visitor passes and ordered a high-level probe into the incident with the assistance of Delhi Police. Central Industrial Security Force (CISF), the paramilitary agency responsible for the security of the parliament, has also started a separate investigation.

=== Interrogation ===
The five accused alleged that they were given electric shocks, tortured, and made to confess to association with opposition parties. They also claimed that they were made to sign 70 blank papers and were also forced to give biometrics and passwords of their phones and social media accounts.

=== Suspension of MPs over protests ===
On 14 December, 15 opposition MPs, 14 from the Lok Sabha (including S. R. Parthiban, whose suspension was later revoked) and 1 from Rajya Sabha were suspended from the parliament session by Vice President Jagdeep Dhankar for 'unruly conduct' after they chanted slogans demanding a statement from the Home Minister Amit Shah.

The opposition MPs were demanding a statement by Home Minister Amit Shah in both the houses of parliament on the breach in security, and a detailed discussion on the same.

One of the suspended MPs, S. R. Parthiban from the Dravida Munnetra Kazhagam (DMK), was not present in the house at the time of the session. His suspension was later revoked, and Parliamentary Affairs minister Pralhad Joshi said that the suspension of Parthiban was the result of a mistake on the part of the staff in identifying the member. Joshi also said that the other 14 MPs were suspended for violating a new parliament rule that disallows placards. Former finance minister and Indian National Congress MP P. Chidambaram dubbed the suspension of Parthiban as "comedy". The Congress termed the suspension of opposition MPs as the "murder of democracy" and accused the Bharatiya Janata Party (BJP) government of reducing parliament to a rubber stamp. Former Congress president Rahul Gandhi also said that the breach was a direct fallout of unemployment and inflation.

On 18 December, another 78 MPs (33 from the Lok Sabha and 45 from the Rajya Sabha) were suspended, taking the total tally of suspended MPs to 92 (46 from the Lok Sabha and 46 from the Rajya Sabha).

Amid the new wave of suspensions on 18 December, Congress floor leader in the Lok Sabha, Adhir Ranjan Chowdhury, who was also suspended, remarked that: "Today it is MPs, tomorrow it will be [the] common people’s turn".

A further 49 MPs from Lok Sabha were suspended on 19 December, two on 20 December, and three on 21 December. taking the final count to 146, from which 100 are from the Lok Sabha, and 46 from the Rajya Sabha.

Congress leader Jairam Ramesh claimed that the "complete purge" was being executed to pass "draconian bills" without any meaningful debate and let BJP MP Pratap Simha, who facilitated the intruders into the Lok Sabha, go scot-free.

The opposition accused the BJP government of "attacking democracy", Congress MP P. Chidambaram said that parliament "is going to resemble the North Korean assembly".

Suspension of opposition MPs over protests following the breach
Date	Lok Sabha	Rajya Sabha	Total
14 December	13 (Note: Does not include one MP whose suspension was revoked)	1	14
18 December	33	45	78
19 December	49	—	49
20 December	2	—	2
21 December	3	—	3
	100	46	146

=== Pratap Simha's role ===
The opposition demanded strict action against BJP MP from Mysore, Pratap Simha, after reports surfaced that Simha issued visitors' passes to the intruders who breached the security in Lok Sabha. They compared it to the suspension of former Trinamool Congress MP Mahua Moitra, who lost her membership of parliament after her parliament login credentials were used by a Dubai-based businessman. Congress workers in Mysuru also staged protests outside Simha's office there, as Karnataka Chief Minister Siddaramaiah demanded a fair investigation into the incident.

=== Probe findings ===
A preliminary inquiry into the breach revealed that the position of Joint Secretary (Security), has been vacant for more than 45 days. It also revealed that there was a 40% shortage in staff, with only 230 personnel currently being employed. It was also noted that when the gas canisters were released in the Lok Sabha, the smoke alarms did not activate. A reduction of around ₹300,000,000 (US$3.6 million) in the annual budget allocated to the parliament compound was also observed.

== See also ==
- 1966 anti-cow slaughter riot
- 2001 Indian Parliament attack
- 2001 Jammu and Kashmir legislative assembly car bombing
- 2014 shootings at Parliament Hill, Ottawa
- 2017 storming of the Macedonian Parliament
- 2021 storming of the United States Capitol
