= Parliament Security Services =

Law enforcement agency in India

Coordinates: 28°37′2″N 77°12′29″E

Parliament Security Service (PSS)
- Emblem of India

Type
- Type: Bicameral
- Houses: Rajya Sabha (Council of States); Lok Sabha (House of the People)

Leadership
- President: Droupadi Murmu since 25 July 2022
- Chairperson of the Rajya Sabha- Vice-President: Vacant
- Deputy Chairman of the Rajya Sabha: Harivansh Narayan Singh, JD(U) since 9 August 2018
- Speaker of the Lok Sabha: Om Birla, BJP since 19 June 2019
- Deputy Speaker of the Lok Sabha: Vacant
- Leader of the House (Lok Sabha): Narendra Modi, BJP since 26 May 2014
- Leader of the House (Rajya Sabha): Piyush Goyal, BJP since 13 July 2021
- Leader of the Opposition (Rajya Sabha): Mallikarjun Kharge, INC since 17 December 2022
- Leader of the Opposition (Lok Sabha): Rahul Gandhi, INC since 26 June 2024

Website
- parliamentofindia.nic.in

The Parliament Security Service (PSS) looked after the security set up in the Indian Parliament House complex. It was the in-house system providing proactive, preventive, and protective security to the building and its incumbents. The PSS was responsible for the management of regulation of people, material, and vehicles within the historical Parliament House Complex. It was abolished following a security audit after 2023 Indian Parliament breach. Its duties were handed over to the Central Industrial Security Force.

== History ==
After the Central Legislative Assembly bombing on 8 April 1929, when Bhagat Singh and Batukeshwar Dutt threw two low-intensity bombs into the Assembly chamber to protest repressive colonial measures, notably the Public Safety Bill and the Trade Disputes Bill. The Central Legislative Assembly moved to strengthen its internal security framework. Consequently, on 3 September 1929, it established a “Watch and Ward Committee” to oversee and institutionalize security arrangements within the legislature.

On 15 April 2009, the Watch & Ward was renamed the Parliament Security Service.

== Administration ==
The Director of the Rajya Sabha exercised operational control over the Parliament Security Service.

== Role ==
Being the in-house security service, the PSS's prime approach revolved around the principles of authorization, verification, identification and authentication of people and resources entering the Parliament House Complex. Due to increased threat perception caused by the growth of various terrorist organizations and their refinement in planning, intelligence, and tactics, new security procedures had been introduced by the PSS to counter the ever-changing modus operandi of terrorist outfits and individuals posing a threat to the Parliament House Complex and its VIPs.

The Parliament Security Services was the nodal security organization responsible for security of Parliament House Complex and the objective is ensured by coordinating with various other security agencies.

The PSS played an important role during the presidential election, helping with the collection, containing, transport, and protection of ballots and ballot boxes.

One of the most important operational activities of the PSS was to show visitors around the Parliament House Complex. The PSS also gave educational tours to students and ensures that any visiting foreign dignitaries and delegations are properly escorted and given factual and detailed information about the history of the Parliament, its building, and its procedures.

Having expertise in the identification of members of Parliament, PSS officers were also called on for identification assistance during VVIP functions. The PSS also assisted during oath ceremonies and annual Republic and Independence Day functions.
