= 2001 Jammu and Kashmir Legislative Assembly car bombing =

Islamist terror attack in India

2001 Jammu and Kashmir legislative assembly car bombing
- Location: 32.735°N 74.863°E; Srinagar, Jammu and Kashmir, India
- Date: 1 October 2001
- Attack type: 4 bombings
- Weapons: Firearms (Unsure), Explosives
- Deaths: 38 (+3 attackers)
- Injuries: 60
- Perpetrator: Jaish-e-Mohammed

On Monday, 1 October 2001, three militants belonging to Jaish-e-Mohammed carried out an attack on the Jammu and Kashmir State Legislative Assembly complex in Srinagar using a Tata Sumo loaded with explosives, ramming it into the main gate with three fidayeen suicide bombers. 38 people, plus the three attacker terrorists, were killed.

== Attack ==
The attack took place at about 2 pm, one hour after close of business. One terrorist attacker drove a Tata Sumo loaded with explosives to the main entrance and exploded it. The other militants entered the building and seized control. All militants were killed in the ensuing gunbattle which lasted several hours. No lawmakers were killed as they were meeting in temporary facilities because the legislature building had recently been damaged in a fire. Many senior leaders had already left the building. The speaker Mr Abdul Ahad Vakil was escorted to safety by the security forces.

== Jaish‑e‑Mohammed Claim ==
Jaish-e-Mohammed claimed responsibility and named a Pakistani national Wajahat Hussain as the suicide bomber.

== India’s Response to the Suicide Attack ==
Subsequently, India's Foreign Ministry issued a strongly worded statement aimed clearly at the government of Pakistan. "India cannot accept such manifestations of hate and terror from across its borders" said the statement. "There is a limit to India's patience." Farooq Abdullah, chief minister of Jammu and Kashmir, eulogized the 38 victims and called for reprisal attacks on Pakistan, where the group blamed for the attack is based. "The time has come to wage a war against Pakistan and to bomb the militant training camps there", he said. "We are running out of patience."

== See also ==
- 2006 Srinagar bombings
- 2013 Srinagar attack
- List of terrorist incidents in India
- List of attacks on legislatures
