= 2019 Pulwama attack =

Terrorist attack in India

- Part of the insurgency in Jammu and Kashmir
- Location of the attack in the Indian-administered union territory of Jammu and Kashmir
- Location: 33°57′53″N 74°57′52″E; Lethapora, Pulwama district, Jammu and Kashmir, India
- Date: 14 February 2019; 15:15 IST (UTC+05:30)
- Target: Central Reserve Police Force personnel
- Attack type: Suicide attack, car bombing
- Deaths: 40 (+1 suicide bomber)
- Injuries: 35
- Perpetrators: Mastermind is Mohammad Ismal Alvi he also known as Saifullah, Adnan or Lamboo †; Jaish-e-Mohammed; Lashkar-e-Taiba
- Assailant: Adil Ahmad Dar
- Accused: 19 (out of which 7 killed, 7 arrested)

The 2019 Pulwama attack occurred on 14 February 2019, when a convoy of vehicles carrying Indian security personnel on the Jammu–Srinagar National Highway was attacked by a vehicle-borne suicide bomber at Lethapora in the Pulwama district of the erstwhile state of Jammu and Kashmir. The attack killed 40 Central Reserve Police Force (CRPF) (Note: The Central Reserve Police Force is the largest central paramilitary force under the Ministry of Home Affairs. It is used to supplement the local police forces in contingencies and for countering insurgencies. According to Rajeswari Pillai Rajagopalan of the Observer Research Foundation, it is less trained and armed than the Army.) personnel as well as the perpetrator — Adil Ahmad Dar— who was a local Kashmiri youth from the Pulwama district. The responsibility for the attack was claimed by the Pakistan-based Islamist terrorist group, Jaish-e-Mohammed. India blamed neighbouring Pakistan for the attack, while the latter condemned the attack and denied having any connections to it. The attack dealt a severe blow to India–Pakistan relations, consequently resulting in the 2019 India–Pakistan military standoff. Subsequently, Indian investigations identified 19 accused. By August 2021, the main accused along with six others had been killed, and seven had been arrested.

== Background ==
Kashmir is a disputed territory, claimed both by India and Pakistan with both countries administering part of the territory. Pakistan has sought to gain control of Indian-administered Kashmir. An insurgency began to proliferate in Indian-administered Kashmir in the late 1980s. Pakistan provided the insurgency with material support. Since 1989, about 70,000 people have been killed in the uprising and the Indian crackdown. According to Time, unrest in Kashmir grew in 2016 after India killed a popular militant leader, Burhan Wani. A rising number of young locals from Indian administered Kashmir have joined the militancy. Many sources state that the majority of militants in Kashmir are now local, not foreign. In 2018 alone, the death toll included 260 militants, 160 civilians and 150 government forces.

Since 2015, Pakistan-based militants in Kashmir have increasingly taken to high-profile suicide attacks against the Indian security forces. In July 2015, three gunmen attacked a bus, and police station in Gurdaspur. Early in 2016, four to six gunmen attacked the Pathankot Air Force Station. In February and June 2016, the militants killed nine and eight security personnel respectively in Pampore. In September 2016, four assailants attacked an Indian Army brigade headquarters in Uri killing 19 soldiers. On 31 December 2017, the Commando Training Centre at Lethpora was also attacked by militants killing five security personnel. These attacks took place in the vicinity of the Jammu–Srinagar National Highway.

== Attack ==
Personnel killed
State	Number
Uttar Pradesh	12
Rajasthan	5
Punjab	4
Bengal	2
Odisha	2
Uttarkhand	2
Bihar	2
Maharashtra	2
Tamil Nadu	2
Assam	1
Karnataka	1
Jammu and Kashmir	1
Himachal Pradesh	1
Kerala	1
Jharkhand	1
Madhya Pradesh	1
Total	40

On 14 February 2019, a convoy of 78 vehicles transporting more than 2,500 Central Reserve Police Force (CRPF) personnel from Jammu to Srinagar was travelling on National Highway 44. The convoy had left Jammu around 03:30 IST and was carrying a large number of personnel due to the highway having been shut down for two days prior. The convoy was scheduled to reach its destination before sunset.

At Lethpora near Awantipora, around 15:15 IST, a bus carrying security personnel was rammed by a car carrying explosives. It caused a blast which killed 40 CRPF personnel of the 76th Battalion and injured many others. The injured were moved to the army base hospital in Srinagar.

Pakistan-based militant group Jaish-e-Mohammed claimed responsibility for the attack. They also released a video of the assailant Adil Ahmad Dar, 22, from Kakapora who had joined the group a year earlier. Dar's family had last seen him in March 2018, when he left his house on a bicycle one day and never returned. Pakistan denied any involvement, though Jaish-e-Mohammed's leader, Masood Azhar, is known to operate in the country.

It was the deadliest terror attack on India's state security personnel in Kashmir since 1989.

=== Perpetrator ===
The perpetrator was identified as Adil Ahmad Dar, a 22-year old from Kakapora. According to Dar's parents, Dar became radicalized after he was beaten by Indian police. Between September 2016 and March 2018, Adil Dar was reportedly arrested six times by Indian authorities. However, each time he was released without any charges.

The Pakistani Chief of the Air Staff admitted to playing a role in the Pulwama attacks after initially denying any involvement.

== Ignoring Intelligence inputs ==
Central Government had received at least 11 intelligence inputs, including from the Intelligence Bureau and Kashmir Police, days before the attack. Two days before the attack, Jaish-e-Mohammed uploaded a video of a suicide attack in Afghanistan and hinted at launching a similar attack in Kashmir. The Home Ministry refused to provide CRPF aircraft on the day of the attack and instead let the convoy take the road route, ignoring intelligence inputs.

== Investigation ==
The National Investigation Agency (NIA) dispatched a 12-member team to probe the attack, working with the Jammu and Kashmir Police.

Initial investigations suggested the car was carrying more than 300 kilograms (660 lb) of explosives, including 80 kilograms (180 lb) of RDX, a high explosive, and ammonium nitrate. Lt Gen Hooda said that the explosives might have been stolen from a construction site. He initially said that it was not possible that they were smuggled from across the border, but later said that he could not rule it out.

National Investigation Agency was able to establish and confirm the identity of suicide bomber as DNA samples from "meagre fragments of the car" used in suicide attack matched with Adil Ahmad Dar's father. However, even after a year of investigation, NIA was unable to trace the source of explosives. The charge-sheet filed by the NIA in August 2020 named 19 accused.

== Aftermath ==
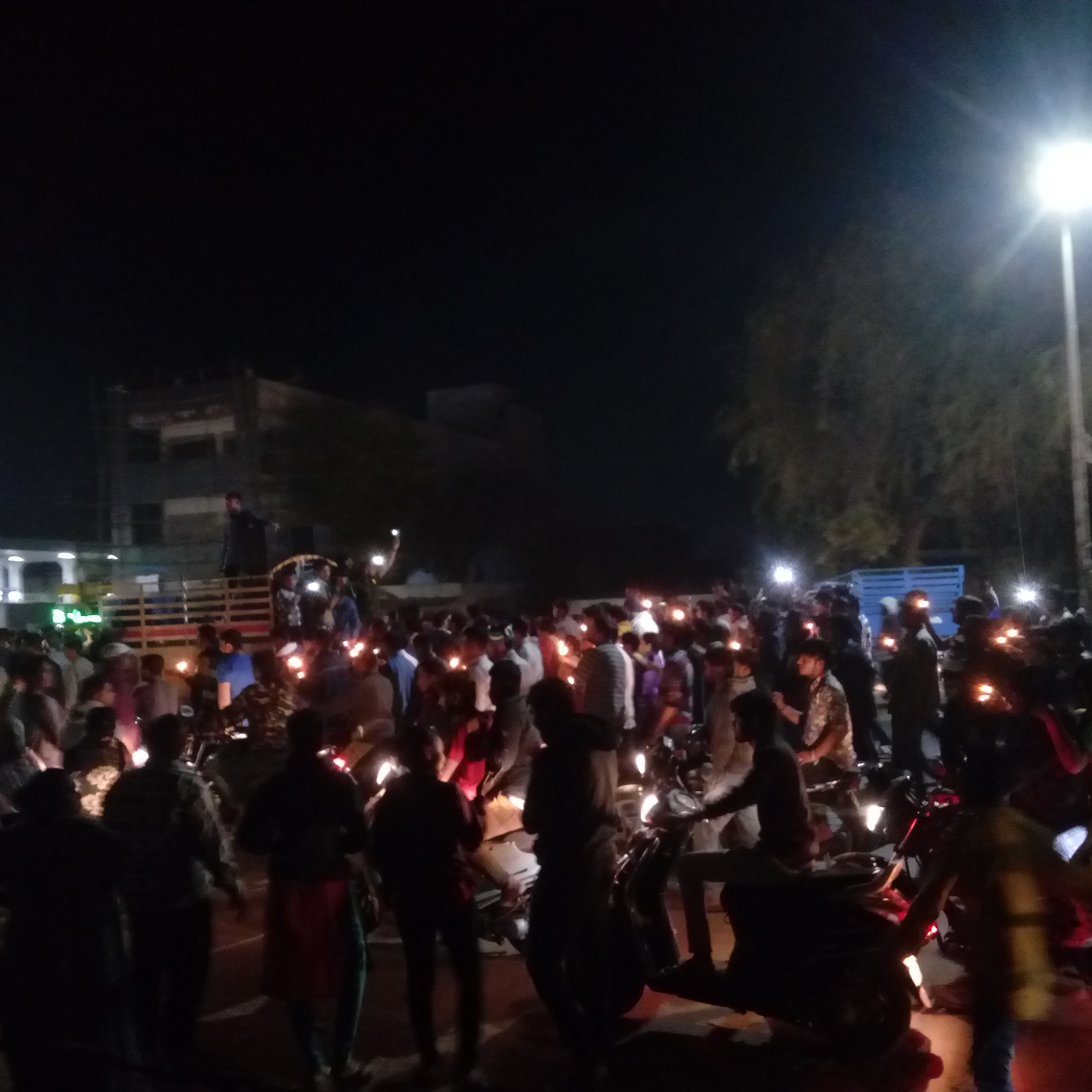
Candle light march organised in Mehsana, Gujarat

State funerals of security personnel killed in the attack were held in their respective native places. The government of Punjab announced ex gratia compensation of ₹12 lakh (US$13,000) each to the families of the killed security personnel from the state and a government job to the next of kin. India revoked Pakistan's most favoured nation status. The customs duty on all Pakistani goods imported to India were raised to 200%. The Indian government urged the Financial Action Task Force (FATF) to add Pakistan to its blacklist for failing to comply with counterterrorism measures. The FATF decided to keep it on the 'grey list' and gave Pakistan time till October 2019 to comply with the 27 conditions it had laid down in June 2018, when it was put on the 'grey list', with an attending caveat. If Pakistan failed to comply, it would be added to the blacklist. On 17 February, the state administration revoked security provisions for separatist leaders.

Protests, bandhs and candle light marches were held across India. There were violent protests in Jammu resulting in a curfew being imposed starting 14 February. The Indian community in the United Kingdom held protests outside the Pakistan High Commission in London. A delegation of Indian doctors cancelled their visit to Pakistan for the 13th Association of Anaesthesiologists Congress, organised by the South Asian Association for Regional Cooperation, in Lahore on 7 March. Indian broadcaster DSport said it would no longer broadcast Pakistan Super League cricket matches. The All Indian Cine Workers Association announced a ban on Pakistani actors and artists in the Indian film industry, and stated that strong action would be taken on any organisation violating it. The Indian Film and Television Directors Association also announced a ban on Pakistani artists in films and music produced in India; the president of the organisation threatened to "vandalise" the sets of any Indian film production with Pakistani artists.

On 20 February 2019, Pakistani prisoner Shakarullah, who was serving a life term in India's Jaipur Central Jail under Unlawful Activities (Prevention) Act, was stabbed and beaten to death by four other inmates. India claimed that Shakarullah was allegedly killed in a brawl among the inmates over television volume. Pakistan claimed that he was killed in retaliation of the Pulwama incident.

With reference to the Pulwama terror attack, the FATF has expressed worry over the increasing abuse of e-commerce platforms by terrorist groups. Aluminum powder, an important ingredient used to increase the explosive force of improvised explosive devices (IEDs), was sourced through Amazon, according to the July 2025 FATF Report titled Comprehensive Update on Terrorist Financing Risks.

In May 2026, Hamza Burhan, also known by his alias 'doctor' who was one of the masterminds behind the attack, was shot dead by unidentified gunmen in Muzzafarabad. Burhan had travelled to Pakistan in 2017 on the pretext of pursuing higher studies but later joined the terror outfit Al-Badr where he rose to the rank of commander. He was designated a terrorist by India in 2022.

=== Gunfight with the militants ===
Following intelligence inputs, in the early morning hours of 18 February 2025, a joint team comprising 55 Rashtriya Rifles, CRPF and Special Operations Group of India killed two terrorists and two supporters in an anti-terrorism encounter operation in the ensuing manhunt for the perpetrators in Pulwama. One of them, Abdul Rasheed Ghazi alias Kamran, was identified as a Pakistani national and was considered the mastermind of the attack and a commander of the terrorist group Jaish-e-Muhammad (JeM). In addition, local JeM recruit Hilal Ahmed, along with two sympathisers who housed Ghazi and Ahmed to evade capture, were also shot dead in the encounter. Four security personnel were killed in the gunfight.

=== Anti-Kashmiri backlash ===
Kashmiri students living in other parts of India faced a backlash after the attack, including violence and harassment, and eviction from their homes. In response, many Indians offered to house Kashmiris who may have been evicted.

It was reported that number of Kashmiris fleeing from the rest of India had reached "hundreds". Jammu and Kashmir Students Organisation reported that 97% of Kashmiri students in Dehradun had been evacuated. Two Indian colleges in Dehradun announced that no new Kashmiri students will receive admission. One of those colleges, Alpine College, suspended its dean, who is a Kashmiri, after some groups called for him to be fired.

Tathagata Roy, the governor of the Indian state Meghalaya, tweeted support for a boycott of "everything Kashmiri". Union Minister Ravi Shankar Prasad disagreed with this view. A Kashmiri merchant was beaten in Kolkata; the attack was condemned by West Bengal chief minister Mamata Banerjee.

Kashmir police chief Dilbagh Singh said they had asked affected states to protect students." Former Jammu and Kashmir chief minister Omar Abdullah met with Rajnath Singh seeking assistance.

=== Balakot airstrike ===
On 26 February, twelve Mirage 2000 jets of the Indian Air Force crossed the Line of Control and dropped bombs into Balakot, Pakistan. India claimed that it attacked a Jaish-e-Mohammed training camp and killed a large number of terrorists, reported to be between 300 and 350. Pakistan claimed that they quickly scrambled jets to intercept the IAF jets, who dropped their payloads to quickly return over the Line of Control.

=== India-Pakistan standoff ===
In an ensuing dogfight between Indian and Pakistani jets, an Indian MiG-21 was shot down over Pakistan and its pilot captured. Pakistan released the pilot on 1 March.

=== Pakistan arrests suspects ===
On 5 March, Pakistan arrested 44 members of various groups, including the Jaish-e-Muhammad. Some of those arrested had been named by India in a dossier it gave to Pakistan in the aftermath of the Pulwama attack. Pakistan said those arrested will be held for at least 14 days, and if India provided further evidence they would be prosecuted. Among those arrested were relatives of JeM leader Masood Azhar, including his son Hamad Azhar and his brother Abdul Rauf.

=== Arrests and operations in India ===
By August 2021, Indian security forces had killed seven of the accused, including Saifullah, while seven had been arrested.

== Reactions ==
=== India and Pakistan ===
Indian Prime Minister Narendra Modi condemned the attack and expressed solidarity with the victims and their families. Union Home Minister Rajnath Singh assured that a strong response will be given to the terror attack. India blamed Pakistan for the attack. BBC News has said that the involvement of the Jaish-e-Mohammed in the bombing "directly links" Pakistan to the attack, while also pointing out that Jaish-e-Mohammed had attacked Pakistani military targets in the past. It is widely accepted among security analysts that Jaish-e-Mohammed is the creation of Pakistan's Inter-Services Intelligence. Pakistan banned the group in 2002, but it has resurfaced under different names and retains ISI's support. The New York Times questioned the nature of the link to Pakistan, pointing out that the bomber came from Indian-administered Kashmir and the explosives may also have been locally procured.

The Indian Finance Minister Arun Jaitley has said that India would completely isolate Pakistan in the diplomatic community.

Pakistan denied the allegation of a link to the attack, and Pakistani foreign minister Shah Mahmood Qureshi condemned the bombing. Fawad Chaudhry, Pakistan's federal information minister, said that Pakistan was taking action against Jaish-e-Muhammad and that Pakistan would be able to assist India in taking action against terrorist groups. The Nation, a Pakistani newspaper, called the assailant a "freedom fighter" who eliminated members of an "occupying force". Pakistan and India both recalled their ambassadors for "consultations" in a tit-for-tat move.

On 19 February 2019, Pakistani Prime Minister Imran Khan said that providing safe haven to terrorists was not in Pakistan's interest. He asked for proof of Pakistani involvement and warned India that any military response would be met with retaliation. Indian Ministry of External Affairs responded by criticising him for not condemning the attack and not offering any condolences for the victims. It said that claims by Adil Ahmad Dar and Pakistan-based Jaish-e-Mohammed was sufficient proof. It said that promise of investigation was unconvincing due to a lack of progress in Mumbai and Pathankot attack investigations. In response to Indian criticism, the newspaper Dawn pointed out that Pakistani Foreign Minister Qureshi had expressed sympathies with the victims soon after the attack.

Following the attack on the Indian territory, the producers of the Indian Hindi films, including Notebook, Kabir Singh and Satellite Shankar, decided not to release the films in Pakistan.

Former Indian cricket players and Board of Control for Cricket in India (BCCI) called for the boycott on the 2019 World Cup group match fixture between India and Pakistan with raising concerns on banning Pakistan cricket team from playing in the 2019 Cricket World Cup tournament. However, after conducting a press meet in Dubai, the International Cricket Council (ICC) rejected BCCI's statement regarding banning Pakistan from the World Cup and assured that the scheduled match will go ahead as planned despite the ongoing standoff between the two nations.

On 8 March 2019, the India national cricket team wore camouflage military caps in tribute to the CRPF personnel killed in the attack during the third ODI against Australia at Ranchi. The players also donated their match fees to the National Defence Fund. The Pakistan Cricket Board wrote to the ICC to protest the gesture. The ICC stated that BCCI had asked for, and received, permission to wear the caps.

=== International community ===
The United States condemned the attack and added it would work with India in counterterrorism efforts. It asked Pakistan to stop sheltering terrorists and urged it to cooperate with the investigation and punish those responsible. Pakistan said it was ready to cooperate with such an investigation. A statement from the US Department of State noted that Pakistan-based Jaish-e-Mohammed (JeM) had claimed responsibility for the attack. Bangladesh, Bhutan, China, France, Hungary, Israel, Maldives, Nepal, Russia, Saudi Arabia, Singapore, Sri Lanka, Turkey, the United Arab Emirates, and the United Kingdom condemned the attack, as did the United Nations Secretary-General. China and Turkey also defended Pakistan's efforts to fight terrorism. China placed a temporary block on a UN Security Council resolution following the attack, which was backed by all other permanent members of the council, to designate JeM leader Masood Azhar as a global terrorist.

Iran's Deputy Foreign Minister Abbas Araghchi met with India's External Affairs Minister Sushma Swaraj and referring to both the 2019 Pulwama attack and the 2019 Khash–Zahedan suicide bombing, he stated that Iran and India would work together to prevent future attacks.

== Legacy ==
The Indian cricket team paid tribute to the 40 soldiers killed in the Pulwama attack by wearing the camouflage caps instead of the usual sky blue team India cap, during the third One Day International match with Australia in Ranchi. Pakistan objected to this gesture and Pakistani Information Minister Fawad Chaudhry and Foreign Minister Shah Mahmood Qureshi called the International Cricket Council (ICC) to ban the Indian team for allegedly mixing cricket with politics. After a complaint from the Pakistani Cricket Board, The ICC clarified that the Indian team had requested and was granted permission to wear the camouflage caps as a part of fundraising drive and to pay tribute to the soldiers killed in the attack.

== See also ==
- The Lover Boy of Bahawalpur
- 2016 Uri attack
- 2019 Balakot airstrike
- India–Pakistan relations
- Insurgency in Jammu and Kashmir
- List of terrorist incidents in India

== Bibliography ==
- Basrur, Rajesh (2017). "India and Pakistan: Persistent rivalry". In Ganguly, Sumit; Scobell, Andrew; Liow, Joseph Chinyong (eds.). The Routledge Handbook of Asian Security Studies (2nd ed.). Routledge. ISBN 9781138210295.
- Gregory, Shaun (2007). "The ISI and the War on Terrorism". Studies in Conflict & Terrorism. 30 (12): 1013–1031. doi:10.1080/10576100701670862. ISSN 1057-610X. S2CID 71331428.
- Jaffrelot, Christophe (2015). The Pakistan Paradox: Instability and Resilience. Oxford University Press. ISBN 978-0-19-023518-5.
- Kapur, S. Paul (2011). "Peace and Conflict in the Indo-Pakistani Rivalry: Domestic and Strategic Causes". In Thompson, William R.; Ganguly, Sumit (eds.). Asian Rivalries: Conflict, Escalation, and Limitations on Two-level Games. Stanford, California: Stanford University Press. ISBN 978-0-8047-7595-3.
- Moj, Muhammad (2015). The Deoband Madrassah Movement: Countercultural Trends and Tendencies. Anthem Press. ISBN 978-1-78308-389-3.
