= Surprise Day =

- Official name: Surprise Day
- Observed by: Pakistan
- Type: National, military
- Significance: Commemoration of the successful retaliation by the Pakistan Air Force against an attempted strike by India in 2019
- Celebrations: Media transmissions, ceremonies at PAF Headquarters, various activities across the country
- Date: February 27
- Frequency: annual

Surprise Day has been observed in Pakistan since 2020 as Pakistan Air Force (PAF) successfully retaliated against an attempted attack by India in 2019. The event is marked with various activities across the country, including special broadcasts by media outlets, and is seen as a tribute to PAF's defense of national sovereignty.

== Background ==
On 27 February 2019, tensions between India and Pakistan escalated when Indian Air Force (IAF) aircraft violated Pakistan's airspace. In response, the PAF launched Operation Swift Retort during which it shot down two Indian fighter jets. One of them, Indian pilot Abhinandan Varthaman, was captured by Pakistan but was later handed over to New Delhi as a gesture of peace.

== Celebrations and significance ==
Various activities are organized across the country on the occasion of Surprise Day. Media outlets conduct special broadcasts, and educational institutions and civil society in Azad Jammu and Kashmir (AJK) also observe the day. While Pakistan Air Force celebrates Surprise Day with a ceremony at PAF Headquarters.

Surprise Day serves as a reminder of Pakistan's commitment to peace and its readiness to defend its sovereignty and is seen as a tribute to the PAF's defense of the country's sovereignty.

=== Art exhibitions ===
Art exhibitions are also organized as part of the Surprise Day celebrations. These exhibitions showcase various forms of art that pay tribute to the bravery and professionalism of the Pakistan Air Force. These exhibitions provide a platform for artists to express their patriotism and appreciation for the armed forces.

== Statements from officials ==
On 27 February 2023, Prime Minister Shahbaz Sharif assured that Pakistan's goal is peace with all, but he is mindful of his duty to defend the country.

On 27 February 2021, then Director General Inter Services Public Relations (ISPR) Major General Babar Iftikhar said that Pakistan stands for peace but will respond with full force when challenged

On 27 February 2022, then Chief Minister Punjab Sardar Usman Buzdar also paid tribute to Pakistan Air Force for defending the motherland.
