= 2019 Balakot airstrike =

Airstrike conducted by the Indian Air Force

- Part of 2019 India–Pakistan border skirmishes
| Date | 26 February 2019 |
| Location | Balakot, Khyber Pakhtunkhwa, Pakistan |
| Result | (26 February 2019) Indian bombing raid conducted within Pakistani territory, no consequential targets hit. |

Belligerents
| India: Indian Air Force | Pakistan: Pakistan Air Force |

Commanders and leaders
| Air Chief Marshal Birender Singh Dhanoa | Air Chief Marshal Mujahid Anwar Khan |

Units involved
| Unknown | Unknown |

Strength
| Unknown | Unknown |

The 2019 Balakot airstrike was a bombing raid conducted by Indian warplanes on 26 February 2019 in Balakot, Pakistan, against an alleged training camp of the terrorist group Jaish-e-Mohammed. Open source satellite imagery revealed that no targets of consequence were hit. The following day, Pakistan shot down an Indian warplane and took its pilot, Abhinandan Varthaman, prisoner. Indian anti-aircraft fire accidentally downed an Indian helicopter killing six airmen on board and one civilian on the ground, their deaths receiving little or no coverage in the Indian media, and remaining officially unacknowledged until seven months later.

India claimed it had downed a Pakistani F-16 fighter. Defence and military analysts found India's evidence to be circumstantial, its claim discredited by the absence of the required US Department of Defense announcement about the loss, and a leak by department officials of the satisfactory enumeration of these aircraft in Pakistan. The airstrike was used by India's ruling party to bolster its patriotic appeal in the general elections of April 2019.

The airstrike was conducted by India in the early morning of 26 February when Indian warplanes crossed the de facto border in the disputed region of Kashmir and dropped bombs in the vicinity of the town of Balakot in Khyber Pakhtunkhwa province in Pakistan. Pakistan's military, the first to announce the airstrike in the morning of 26 February, described the Indian planes as dropping their payload in an uninhabited wooded hilltop area near Balakot. India, confirming the airstrike later the same day, characterized it to be a preemptive strike directed against a terrorist training camp, and causing the deaths of a "large number" of terrorists. Satellite imagery analyzed by the Atlantic Council's Digital Forensics Laboratory, Reuters, European Space Imaging, and the Australian Strategic Policy Institute, has concluded that India did not hit any targets of significance on the Jaba hilltop site in the vicinity of Balakot.

The following day on 27 February, in a tit-for-tat airstrike, Pakistan retaliated, causing an Indian warplane to be shot down and its pilot to be taken prisoner by the Pakistan military before being returned on 1 March. An Indian Mi-17 helicopter was brought down by friendly fire in which all six airmen on board were killed; this was acknowledged by India on 4 October 2019. The airstrikes were the first time since the India-Pakistan war of 1971 that warplanes of either country crossed the Line of Control and also since both states became nuclear powers. (Note: India became a nuclear power with successful Smiling Buddha operation in 1974 and Pakistan's successful operation of Chagai-I took place in 1998.) On 10 April 2019, 47 days after the airstrike, some international journalists, who were taken to the Jaba hilltop in a tightly controlled trip arranged by Pakistani government, found the largest building of the site to show no evidence of damage or recent rebuilding.

== Background ==
The Kashmir insurgency has been occurring since 1989, but a new wave of violence was witnessed during 2016 when Burhan Wani then commander of Hizbul Mujahideen was killed in an encounter. In 2018, more than 500 people (including civilians, soldiers and militants) were killed in the violence. On 14 February 2019, a convoy of vehicles carrying security personnel on the Jammu–Srinagar National Highway was attacked by a vehicle-borne suicide bomber at Lethpora in the Pulwama district, Jammu and Kashmir, India. The attack resulted in the deaths of 46 Central Reserve Police Force personnel and the attacker. The perpetrator of the attack was from Indian-administered Kashmir. The responsibility for the attack was claimed by the Pakistan-based Islamist militant group Jaish-e-Mohammed. Pakistan condemned the attack, and denied any connection to it.

The airstrike occurred ahead of the 2019 Indian general election. On 19 February, Pakistani Prime Minister Imran Khan attributed Indian government's desire to attack Pakistan to the upcoming election. The Indian government rejected the allegation.

== Incident ==
On 26 February 2019, Pakistan announced the intrusion of Indian aircraft into its airspace, but asserted that the Indian fleet was intercepted, causing them to retreat, to release their bombs which hit an open area, and to dump their fuel. In a press briefing, Pakistan's Director-General Inter-Services Public Relations (ISPR), Major General Asif Ghafoor, stated that three IAF teams were spotted approaching the Pakistan border from various sectors in early on 26 February. He added that the two of these teams did not cross the border following a challenge from Pakistani aircraft flying combat air patrol, but the third one crossed the Line of Control from the Kiran Valley near Muzaffarabad before being intercepted by Pakistani Air Force (PAF) jets within three minutes of the incursion.

Later on 26 February 2019, India confirmed the airstrike, stating that the Indian Air Force conducted them in retaliation to the Pulwama attack. The strikes were subsequently claimed to be "non-military" and "preemptive'' in nature; targeting a Jaish-e-Mohammed facility within Pakistan as part of its "Operation Bandar". (Note: Scholar Ayesha Jalal has mentioned, "Many recruits to the Jaish-i-Muhammad were trained in a madrassa in Balakot named after Sayyid Ahmad Shaheed". Rana and Mir state describe its precise location, "At a distance of five kilometres from this village [Attar Sheesha] there is a dirt track on the left that leads up to the mountains.... If an ordinary person does reach the madrassa he is not allowed to enter. Even Jaishe Mohammed workers can only enter after a thorough search and a registration process.... Judging from the outside, the area of the madrassa is very large and there is a fort like entrance gate that has a Jaishe Mohammed flag flying atop it.")

The airstrike was the first time since the Indo-Pakistani War of 1971 that attacking warplanes had crossed the Line of Control.

Indian media claimed to have confirmed from official sources that twelve Mirage 2000 jets were involved in the operation. The Indian Express further reported that the Mirage 2000s were carrying SPICE 2000 and Popeye precision-guided munitions and that they were supported by four Sukhoi Su-30MKI, Netra and Phalcon airborne early warning and control aircraft, an IAI Heron UAV and two Ilyushin Il-78 aerial refuelling aircraft. Furthermore, Indian officials claim that four SU-30MKIs were launched from their South Punjab base and headed towards Jodhpur and on to Barmer, Rajasthan before turning West towards Jaish-e-Mohammed headquarters in Pakistan located in the populous town of Bahawalpur. These four aircraft, tasked as decoys, successfully drew PAF fighters way south of the main attack force.

After releasing the bombs, the jets returned into Indian airspace unharmed and the Indian media claimed that whilst Pakistan scrambled its F-16 jets, they could not engage the Indian planes. Retired PAF Air Marshall Masood Akhtar opined that the air forces of both countries may have been instructed not to attack each other to avoid further escalation of conflict.

== Target ==
There has been ambiguity among the sources as to what the exact target was, and about whether the madrasa – Taleem ul-Quran run by Masood Azhar's brother-in-law, Muhammad Yusuf Azhar (involved in the hijacking of Indian Airlines Flight 814), was an active JeM camp or not.

According to a diplomatic cable leaked in 2011, a 2004 United States Department of Defense interrogation report stated that Balakot had "a training camp that offers both basic and advanced terrorist training on explosives and artillery." In contrast, military analysts asserted that whilst the area used to host militant camps, they dispersed after the 2005 Pakistan earthquake to avoid detection by the international aid groups providing relief in the area.

Indian intelligence sources claim that the camp was located in a hilltop forest, 20 km (12 mi) from Balakot, and that it was a resort-style facility, with space and room for 500–700 militants, including a swimming pool, cooks and cleaners. The New York Times mentioned western security officials of having doubted the existence of such large-scale training camps, asserting that Pakistan no longer runs them and that "militant groups are spread out in small groups around the country".

Independent Urdu noted that the madrasa had held JeM events promoting jihad as recently as 2018, which were advertised in its magazines, including speeches about Syed Ahmad Barelvi by JeM leader Abdul Rauf Azhar.

The local people varied as to the purpose of the facility. In the immediate aftermath of the strikes, whilst some claimed of it being an active JeM training camp, others asserted it to have been a mere school for the local children and that such militant camps used to exist far earlier. On later visits by Reuters, the locals claimed that the school had been shut down about a year back and was no longer operational.

== Damage ==
Neutral sources have asserted that the munitions dropped by Indian warplanes appeared to have only hit several trees and caused no other damage nor any human casualties. Western diplomats in Islamabad stated that they did not believe the Indian Air Force had hit any militant camp, with one stating that it was "common knowledge amongst our intelligence" that the militant training camp in Balakot had been moved some years back. Western security officials have cast doubt over Indian claims and asserted that there are no longer any such large scale militant camps in Pakistan.

India has asserted that "a very large number of JeM terrorists, trainers, senior commanders and groups of jihadis," who were preparing for launching another suicide attack targeting Indian assets, were killed. Indian media reported that the camp was leveled, and about 200–350 JeM militants were killed though the exact figures varied across media-houses. The National Technical Research Organisation had located about 300 active mobile phones in the camp; prior to the strike. In contrast, Pakistan asserted that there were no casualties or infrastructure damage as a result of the attack.

Villagers from the area spoke of four bombs striking a nearby forest and field around 3 am; other than minor bruises and cuts incurred by a local man, and a few cracks in the walls of his home, both caused by shockwaves from the explosions, no damage was reported to humans or buildings. Journalists associated with the Associated Press visited the area on 26 February and saw craters and damaged trees. The villagers they met reported no casualties. A team from Al Jazeera visited the site two days after the strikes and noted "splintered pine trees and rocks" which were strewn across the four blast craters. The local hospital officials and residents asserted that they did not come across any casualty or wounded people. The reporters located the facility, a school run by Jaish-e-Mohammed, at around a kilometre to the east of one of the bomb craters, atop a steep ridge but were unable to access it. Reporters from Reuters were repeatedly denied access to the madrassa by the military citing security issues but they noted the structure (and its vicinity) to be intact from the back. The press wing of the Pakistan military had twice postponed scheduled visits to the site. However, on 29 March 2019, Inter-Services Public Relations (ISPR) took journalists to the site where the strike took place. There were around 375 students present in the Madrasa. Journalists were allowed to interview the students. They were also allowed to take photos and record videos of the site.

=== Satellite data assessments ===
Satellite data analysis by the Australian Strategic Policy Institute's Nathan Ruser concluded that there is "no apparent evidence of more extensive damage and on the face of it does not validate Indian claims regarding the effect of the strikes." Michael Sheldon, a digital forensics analyst from Atlantic Council did another independent investigation on the issue which asserted that no damage was inflicted to any infrastructure around the target-site. It concluded that "something appeared to have gone wrong in the targeting process" and that the botch-up was mysterious in light of the autonomous nature of the supposedly used missiles. A Reuters investigation based on high-resolution satellite imagery by Planet Labs noted an unchanged landscape when compared to an April 2018 satellite photo. It noted that "there were no discernible holes in the roofs of buildings, no signs of scorching, blown-out walls, displaced trees around the madrasa or other signs of an aerial attack". Even higher quality imagery, taken from the WorldView-2 satellite, was later also analysed by the Australian Strategic Policy Institute and showed "that all three weapons missed by similar (but not identical) distances" suggesting "that the misses were caused by a systematic targeting error".

European Space Imaging also provided high-resolution image of the site where the strike took place. The satellite imagery was from 27 February 2019, a day after the strike took place. The image showed that buildings were unharmed and there was no sign of casualties at the site. Managing director Adrian Zevenbergen, claimed that "there were no signs of scorching, no large distinguishable holes in the buildings and no signs of stress to the surrounding vegetation".

=== Indian officials claims ===
Indian officials said that analysis of before and after images from the synthetic aperture radar (SAR) carried by an airborne platform showed that four buildings had been destroyed but did not release those images. The official stated that SAR images from the first day after the attack showed that the roofs of the building (made of corrugated galvanized iron (CGI) sheets) were missing, and were repaired after two days. According to the official the presence of new roofs had made the assessment by technical intelligence difficult and it was up to the Indian Government to decide on the release of the classified SAR images. The Indian Air Force showed the reporters of India Today and other media houses, the high-resolution satellite pictures possessed by the IAF which according to India Today showed three holes in the roof of one of the buildings. These holes were reported as a "classic signature of a SPICE bomb strike".

=== Media reports ===
Reuters journalists were prevented from coming near the site of the attack, three times in nine days by the Pakistani security officials. Business Today India stated that the area around Balakot had been cordoned off by the Pakistan Army and evidence such as the dead bodies were being cleared from the area. Praveen Swami writing for Firstpost claimed that Indian intelligence estimated a figure of about 20 casualties and that there were five confirmed kills per burial records. He also noted a JeM rally in Khyber-Pakhtunkhwa on 28 February, wherein Masood Azhar's brother, Abdul Rauf Rasheed Alvi mentioned India's attack of their headquarters and vowed revenge. In another piece, Swami stated that based on intercepted communications, Research and Analysis Wing analysts estimated 90 casualties, including three Pakistani Army trainers. Swami though noted a lack of witness testimony to independently assess the validity of above claims.

US State Department acknowledged reports of Pakistan misusing the F-16s, although undersecretary of State for Arms Control and International Security Affairs didn't mention concerns about the use of F-16s in shooting down Indian fighter jets since acknowledging it in formal State Department transmission would be a clear violation of Congress approved terms for selling the fighters as it would trigger formal procedures to reprimand Islamabad when the Trump administration wanted to repair bilateral diplomatic relations. In 2021, multiple Indian news sources, including India Today, Times of India, Hindustan Times, Swarajya, Deccan Herald, LiveMint, and NDTV reported that former Pakistani diplomat, Zafar Hilaly had allegedly admitting to 300 casualties following the air strike, based on a story shared by Asian News International (ANI) and Republic TV. Alt News, an independent fact-checker, reported that Republic TV had shared a doctored video altering Hilaly's original speech, in which he stated that the air strike was intended to cause casualties, but did not kill anyone. Following this, several of the sources, including News18, NDTV, and Times of India published a retraction of their reports.

== Aftermath ==
The IAF put air defence systems on alert along the international border and Line of Control to respond to any possible retaliation by the Pakistan Air Force.

Pakistan's foreign minister Shah Mahmood Qureshi summoned an emergency meeting in Islamabad, Pakistan to discuss the security situation and asserted that Pakistan reserved the right to retaliate. The prime minister of Pakistan, Imran Khan, convened an emergency meeting to review the situation. At the end of this meeting, the National Security Council (NSC) released a statement denying the Indian claims of the destruction of any terrorist camp and described the attack as "uncalled for" whilst adding that retaliation would be forthcoming after a joint parliamentary session. He also stated that Pakistan will take international media to the area of strikes but were delayed due to adverse weather conditions.

ANI claimed to have released photos of the alleged JeM camp and weapons cache sourced from intelligence sources.

== Reactions ==
=== India ===
Foreign diplomats from the United States, United Kingdom, Russia, Australia, Indonesia, Turkey, China, and six ASEAN nations were briefed by Indian foreign secretary Vijay Gokhale on the strike conducted. Arun Jaitley, the Indian cabinet minister of Finance stated two reasons, for Pakistan denying the effectiveness of the airstrike stating, "There are two plausible reasons. First, the Pakistan army had created a big aura about its prowess among Pakistanis, and it did not want its image dented." Jaitley noted that the second reason was more important, and stated "Had the Pakistan army admitted that our fighters bombed its buildings, the first question to be raised would have been: What was the extent of damage? Experts would have come for a survey of the buildings and asked about the people staying inside... then Pakistan would have had to reveal names of the Jaish fighters who died there." In April 2019, the Indian Minister of External Affairs of India Sushma Swaraj said no Pakistani soldiers or civilians were killed in the airstrike. Pakistani Major General Asif Ghafoor welcomed this statement as "Finally the truth [has been revealed] under ground reality compulsions".

=== International ===
- Australia noted its condemnation of Pulwama attack and asked Pakistan to crack down on terrorists operating from its soil. It also asked both India and Pakistan to restrain from actions that would jeopardize peace.
- China's foreign ministry spokesman Lu Kang stated "We hope that both India and Pakistan can exercise restraint and adopt actions that will help stabilize the situation in the region and improve mutual relations".
- France asked both India and Pakistan to exercise restraint, saying that it supported Indian actions against terrorism and asked Pakistan to stop allowing its territory to be used by terrorists.
- United States' Mike Pompeo, State secretary termed the attack as a "counter-terrorism action" and reaffirmed US-India ties. He asked both sides to show restraint.
- The Organisation of Islamic Cooperation condemned the airstrike and called on both India and Pakistan to show restraint.

== See also ==
- 2019 Pulwama attack
- Indo-Pakistani wars and conflicts
- India–Pakistan relations
- Media coverage of 2019 India–Pakistan standoff
- Battle of Balakot
