= Mujahid Anwar Khan =

15th Air Chief of Pakistan Air Force

Air Chief Marshal Mujahid Anwar Khan NI(M) HI(M) SI(M) TI(M)
- مجاہد انور خان
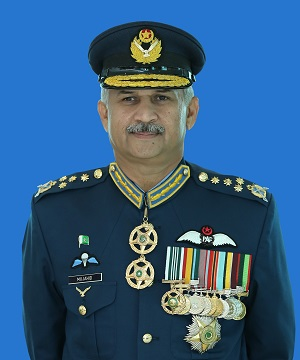

15th Chief of Air Staff
- In office 19 March 2018 – 18 March 2021
- President: Arif-ur-Rehman Alvi
- Prime Minister: Imran Khan
- Preceded by: Sohail Aman
- Succeeded by: Zaheer Ahmad Babar

Personal details
- Born: 1962 (age 63–64) Khyber Pakhtunkhwa, Pakistan

Military service
- Branch/service: Pakistan Air Force
- Years of service: 1983–2021
- Rank: Air Chief Marshal
- Commands: Pakistan Air Force; Air Force Strategic Command
- Battles/wars: Indo-Pakistani Conflicts; 2001 India Pakistan standoff; 2008 India Pakistan standoff; India–Pakistan border skirmishes (2019); Operation Swift Retort; War on terror; Insurgency in Khyber Pakhtunkhwa
- Awards: See list

Mujahid Anwar Khan (Note: Urdu: مجاہد انور خان) is a retired four-star rank officer who served as the 15th Chief of Air Staff of the Pakistan Air Force (PAF) from 2018 to 2021.

On 19 March 2018, Anwar took over command of the PAF from his predecessor Sohail Aman.

== Early life and education ==
Born in an ethnic Rajput Sulehria family originally from Zafarwal. Khan was commissioned in GD (P) Branch of PAF in December 1983. During his career, he commanded a fighter squadron, a flying wing, two operational air bases PAF Base Shahbaz and PAF Base Mushaf and a regional air command.

He is a graduate of Combat Commanders' School, Command and Staff College, Jordan and National Defence University, Islamabad. Khan holds a master's degree in War Studies and Defence Management.

In his previous appointments, he has also served as Personal Staff Officer to Chief of the Air Staff, Assistant Chief of the Air Staff (Operations), Deputy Chief of the Air Staff (Operations), Director General C4I, Deputy Chief of the Air Staff (Support) and Director General Air Force Strategic Command at Air Headquarters, Islamabad. The Air Chief has flown various training and fighter aircraft including F-16, F-6, FT-5, T-37 and MFI-17 Mushhak.

== Awards and recognition ==
In recognition of his meritorious services, he has been awarded Hilal-i-Imtiaz (Military), Sitara-i-Imtiaz (Military), Tamgha-e-Imtiaz (Military), Nishan-e-Imtiaz (Military), Nishan-e-Imtiaz (Civilian), and the Order of Merit of the Republic of Turkey.

In 2024, he was appointed as the global goodwill ambassador of Niaz Support, a social enterprise in Pakistan that provides customized wheelchairs.

== Operation Swift Retort (2019) ==
Under the command of Mujahid Anwar Khan in 2019 Pakistan Air Force participated in the 2019 India–Pakistan border skirmishes between 26–27 February 2019. On 27 February 2019 the Pakistan Air Force (PAF) conducted six airstrikes at multiple locations in Indian-administered Jammu and Kashmir (J&K). The airstrikes were part of the PAF military operation codenamed Operation Swift Retort and were conducted in retaliation to the Indian Air Force (IAF) airstrike in Balakot just a day before on 26 February 2019.

Following Pakistan's airstrikes, Indian Air Force (IAF) jets started pursuing Pakistan Air Force (PAF) jets. In the resulting dogfight, Pakistan claimed to have shot down two Indian jets and captured one Indian pilot, Abhinandan Varthaman. India claimed to have shot down one Pakistani F16 without giving substantive evidence to support its claim.

As a result of the fog of war created out of the dogfight between two air forces, Indian Air Force shot down its own Mil Mi-17 helicopter due to a friendly fire incident in which six IAF personnel were killed including two squadron leaders, namely, Siddarth Vashista and Ninad Mandavgane.

== Awards and decorations ==
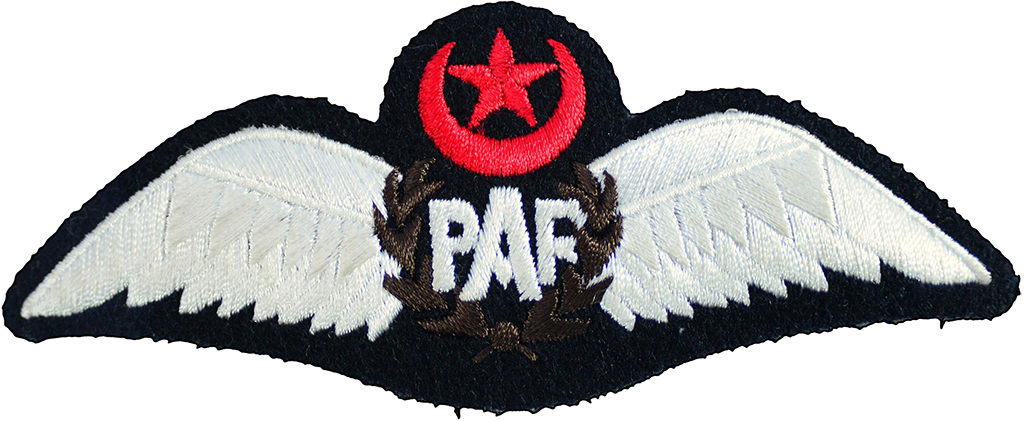

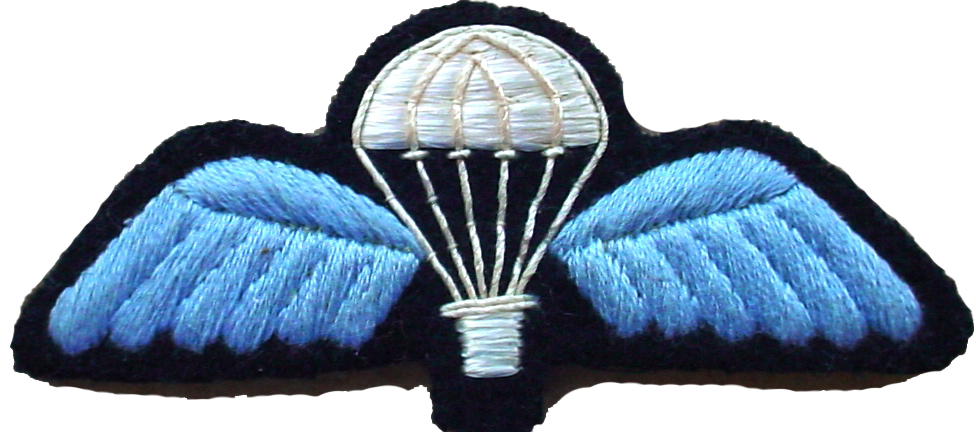

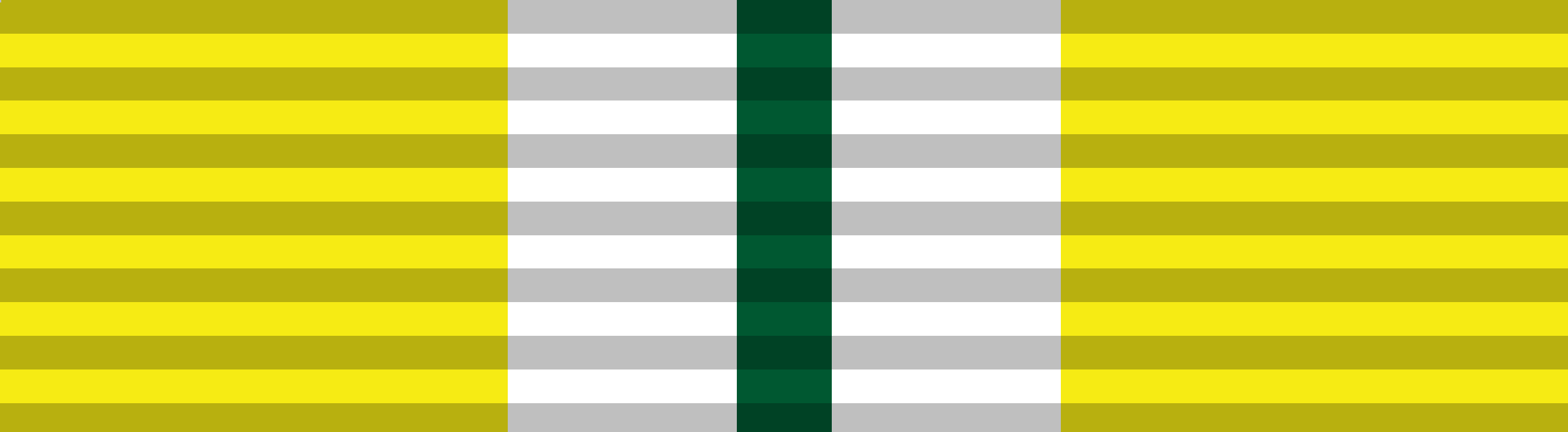

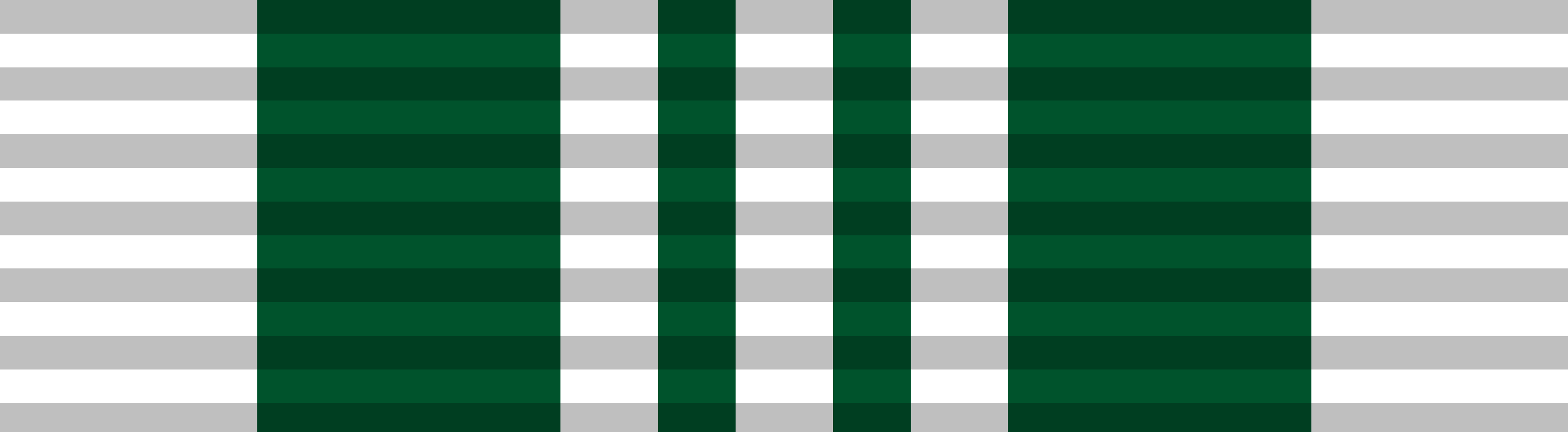

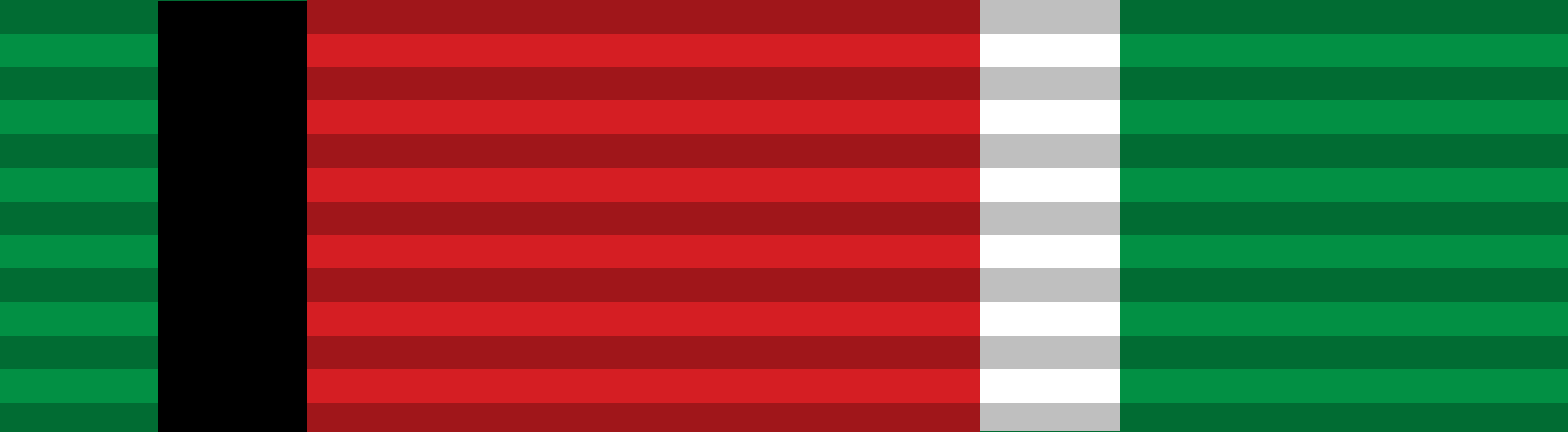

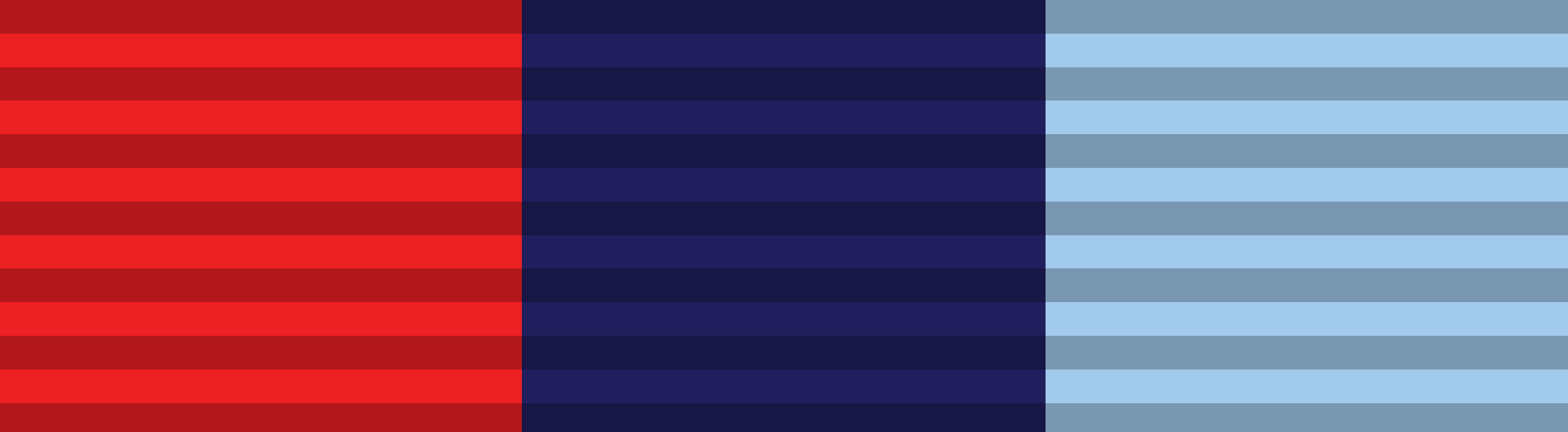

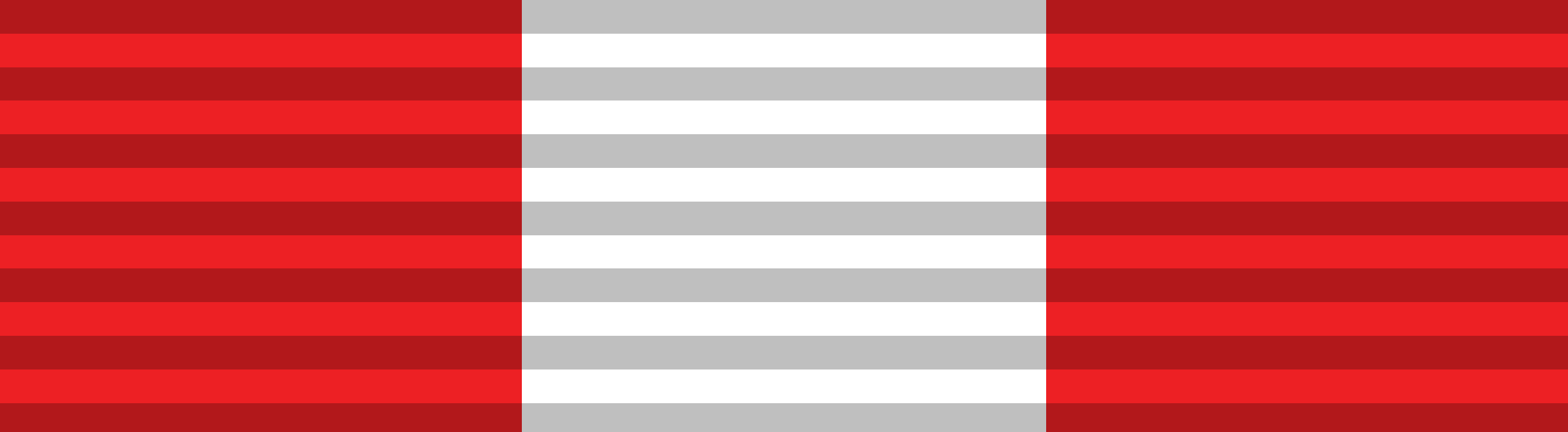

PAF GD(P) Badge RED (More than 3000 Flying Hours)
Parachutist Badge
Nishan-e-Imtiaz (Civilian) (Order of Excellence)		Nishan-e-Imtiaz (Military) (Order of Excellence)	
Hilal-i-Imtiaz (Military) (Crescent of Excellence)	Sitara-i-Imtiaz (Military) (Star of Excellence)	Tamgha-i-Imtiaz (Military) (Medal of Excellence)	Tamgha-e-Baqa (Nuclear Test Medal) 1998
Tamgha-e-Istaqlal Pakistan (Escalation with India Medal) 2002	Tamgha-e-Azm (Medal of Conviction) (2018)	10 Years Service Medal	20 Years Service Medal
30 Years Service Medal	35 Years Service Medal	40 Years Service Medal	Hijri Tamgha (Hijri Medal) 1979
Tamgha-e-Jamhuriat (Democracy Medal) 1988	Qarardad-e-Pakistan Tamgha (Resolution Day Golden Jubilee Medal) 1990	Tamgha-e-Salgirah Pakistan (Independence Day Golden Jubilee Medal) 1997	Order of Merit of the Republic of Turkey 2018

=== Foreign Decorations ===
Foreign Award
Turkey	Order of Merit of the Republic of Turkey

== Effective dates of promotion ==
Insignia	Rank	Date
	Air Chief Marshal	19 March 2018
	Air Marshal	29 February 2016
	Air Vice Marshal	2 July 2013
	Air Commodore	1 September 2009
	Group Captain	15 March 2004
	Wing Commander	1 August 1998
	Squadron Leader	9 August 1990
	Flight Lieutenant	8 March 1987
	Flying Officer	1 March 1985
	Pilot Officer	5 December 1983
