= Media coverage of 2019 India–Pakistan standoff =

The media coverage of the 2019 India-Pakistan standoff was criticised for largely being "jingoistic" and "nationalistic", to the extent of the media war-mongering and the battle being fought between India and Pakistan through newsrooms. During the escalation, fake videos and misinformation were prevalent on the social media which were further reported to escalate tensions between India and Pakistan. Once tensions started de-escalating, the media coverage shifted to comparisons being made between "India and Pakistan" and "Narendra Modi and Imran Khan" in terms of who won the "perception battle".

== Background ==
Propaganda and psychological warfare through the media is an old concept. The media in both India and Pakistan are important "stakeholders" during times of heightened tensions between the two countries. Previous studies conducted have suggested the "nationalistic" role of the media in relation to India and Pakistan conflicts. A Bournemouth University doctoral study by Chindu Sreedharan concluded the dominance of "anti-peace news" in the overall coverage of Kashmir suggesting that the press in India and Pakistan has a counterproductive role in the Kashmir issue and that the "coverage was vigorously government-led and intensely 'negative'". A study in the Pakistan Journal of History and Culture found that newspapers of both countries (India and Pakistan) were "setting the agenda on Kashmir issue positively in the light of foreign policy of their respective country".

== War mongering ==
Various accusations were made against the sections of the Indian and Pakistani media for war-mongering. Indian Nobel Peace Prize laureate Kailash Satyarthi acknowledged the war-mongering prevalent among the Indian media, but added that there were many journalists trying to "de-escalate" the situation too. Both in India and Pakistan, media unions called for a stop on the war-mongering. A story in Quartz quotes Indian journalist Sadanand Dhume (a fellow at the American think tank American Enterprise Institute) where he says "Paradoxically, the over-zealous Indian media and Pakistani media may help prevent escalation of conflict." Foreign Policy came out with an article titled "India’s Media Is War-Crazy". According to it, Indian journalists were very much willing to “reproduce unverified, contradictory and speculative information” that suited the Indian government.

== Perception war ==
Ajai Shukla, an Indian journalist and former Indian Army colonel, writes in Al Jazeera that "Pakistan won the perception war", however adds that Pakistan is losing out in other ways. A report in an Indian media digital website, Scroll.in, was titled "How Imran Khan stumped Narendra Modi in the perception battle over air strikes" where it criticises Narendra Modi for not addressing the media directly during the crisis as compared to Imran Khan who addressed the media directly during the crisis more than once, and in turn directed the narrative. A report in a Pakistani newspaper The News International however said that even if Imran Khan and Narendra Modi won the perception battles in their respective constituencies, neither side wanted a war according to Vipin Narang, a professor at Massachusetts Institute of Technology (MIT).

== Fake news and fact-checking ==
Various media houses resorted to fact-checking related to misinformation related to Air Marshal Chandrashekharan Hari Kumar, Wing Commander Abhinandan Varthanman, F-16s, an Indian submarine and various other things. It was reported after the Balakot airstrikes on 26 February, a fact checking website "Check4Spam" reported a 79% increase in traffic. Old videos and photographs of "crashing fighter jets" were being circulated in both India and Pakistan during the crisis as recent events.

== See also ==
- Media coverage of the Iraq War
- Media coverage of the Arab–Israeli conflict
- Media coverage of the Syrian Civil War
- Media coverage of the Virginia Tech shooting
