= Defence Day =

1965 war Memorial Day in Pakistan

Defence Day یومِ دفاع
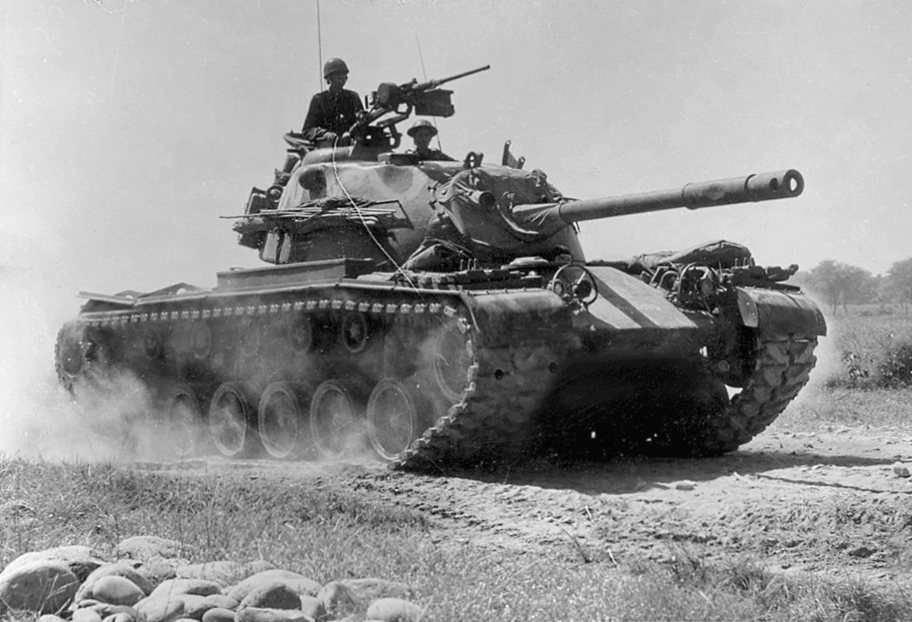
- Pakistani M48 Patton during the 1965 Indo-Pakistani War
- Also called: Youm-e-Difa
- Observed by: Pakistan
- Type: National
- Celebrations: Flag hoisting, parade, military exhibitions, award ceremonies, singing patriotic songs, entertainment and military programmes, speeches, fireworks, etc.
- Date: 6 September
- Next time: 6 September 2027
- Frequency: Annual

Defence Day (Urdu: یومِ دفاع ALA-LC: Yaum-i Difāʿ IPA: [jɔːm-e d̪ɪfɑː]) is celebrated in Pakistan as a national day to commemorate the sacrifices made by Pakistani soldiers in defending its borders. The date of 6 September marks the day in 1965 when Indian troops crossed the international border to launch an attack on Pakistani Punjab in a riposte to Pakistan's Operation Grand Slam targeting Jammu.

== Context of the 1965 War ==
The Indo-Pakistani War of 1965 began with Pakistan sending Mujahideen into the Kashmir Valley to incite rebellion and dislocate local installations. (Note: The infiltration began on 5 August 1965, according to the UN military observers stationed on the Kashmir Line of Control since 1949.: Secretary-General U Thant stated: "the series of violations that began on August 5 were to a considerable extent in subsequent days in the form of armed men not in uniform, crossing the CFL from the Pakistan side for the purpose of armed action on the Indian side.") In the second stage, on 1 September, it launched a tank attack, dubbed Operation Grand Slam, towards the Akhnoor bridge in the Jammu Division. It was intended to be a "short and swift, fait accompli operation." According to scholar Shuja Nawaz, the Pakistani military intended to capture the Akhnoor bridge and swing towards Jammu to cut off India's communications with Kashmir Valley. The Pakistanis had ignored the Indian Prime Minister's (then Lal Bahadur Shastri's) warnings that India would retaliate against Pakistan if Kashmir were attacked.

On 6 September, according to its "pre-declared strategy" of riposte, (Note: A riposte in military strategy involves striking a vulnerable point of the enemy in order to force him to abandon his own attack.) the Indian Army crossed the international border in Punjab, intending to cut off the Grand Trunk Road near Lahore. Another Indian objective was to capture the Lahore Cantonment. The attack came as a surprise to the Pakistani commanders. According to Air Marshal Nur Khan, Army Chief General Musa Khan told President Muhammad Ayub Khan on the second day of the war that the Army had run out of ammunition. However, the statement given by Air Marshal Nur Khan was challenged by the Indian commanders themselves. Lt. Gen Harwant Singh himself stated that the heaviest firing by the Pakistan Army was started after the ceasefire. He states that the Army suffered heavy losses in the war. On 23 September, Pakistan accepted a UN-mandated ceasefire. (Note: India had already accepted various UN proposals for a ceasefire, starting around 14 September.)

Pakistan instituted the Defence of Pakistan Day to commemorate the day when the Indian forces crossed into Pakistan. The Pakistan official narrative states that,

"[the] Indian forces sneaked [sic] into the Wagah border, and the Pakistan armed forces, when alerted, put up a valiant defence of the motherland and drove them back, thus taking its name as the Defence of Pakistan Day."

== Celebrations and parades ==
The Pakistan Army displays its latest missiles, tanks, guns, Pakistan Army Aviation helicopters, and armaments used by Engineers, Electrical and Mechanical Corps, Army Air Defense, Signals, Army Service Corps, and the Army Medical Corps. Everyone is allowed to watch such functions live by going to specific places. These shows are also displayed on national TV channels. National songs, special documentaries about 6 September 1965, and the stories of the people killed that day are displayed on TV.

On this day, a change of guard ceremony takes place at Mazar-e-Quaid, Karachi, where the Pakistan Air Force Academy cadets present the Guard of Honour and take charge.

== Criticism ==
While the day is officially commemorated as an unprovoked surprise attack by India, repulsed by the Pakistan Army despite its smaller size and fewer armaments, the narrative has been criticised by certain Pakistani commentators as representing false history and propaganda. They argue that it was Ayub Khan's Operation Gibraltar that acted as the initiator of the 1965 war, instead of the Indian campaign. According to Air Chief Nur Khan, who led Pakistan Air Force during the 1965 war:

"It was a wrong war, and they misled the nation with a big lie that India, rather than Pakistan, had provoked the war and that we (Pakistanis) were the victims of the Indian aggression."

== See also ==
- Surprise Day

== Bibliography ==
- Hiranandani, Vice Admiral GM (2013), Transition to Guardianship: The Indian Navy 1991–2000, Lancer Publishers LLC, ISBN 978-1-935501-66-4
- Joshi, Manoj (2008), Kashmir, 1947–1965: A Story Retold, India Research Press, ISBN 978-81-87943-52-5
- Kumar, Krishna (2001), Prejudice and Pride: School histories of the freedom struggle in India and Pakistan, Viking, ISBN 9780670049134
- Nawaz, Shuja (2008), Crossed Swords: Pakistan, Its Army, and the Wars Within, Oxford University Press, ISBN 978-0-19-547660-6
- Paul, T. V. (1994), "The Pakistani Offensive in Kashmir, 1965", Asymmetric Conflicts: War Initiation by Weaker Powers, Cambridge University Press, pp. 107–125, ISBN 978-0-521-46621-9

See this for exact dates and names.
