= 2019 Jammu and Kashmir airstrikes =

Airstrikes by Pakistan in Indian-administered Jammu and Kashmir

- Part of the 2019 India–Pakistan border skirmishes
Date	27 February 2019; 7 years ago
Location	Jammu and Kashmir, India 33.38°N 74.3°E

Belligerents
Pakistan: Pakistan Air Force	India: Indian Air Force

Commanders and leaders
Arif Alvi (President); Imran Khan (Prime Minister); Qamar Javed Bajwa (Chief of Army Staff) (Pakistan) Mujahid Anwar Khan (Chief of Air Staff)	(India) Ram Nath Kovind (President) (India) Narendra Modi (Prime Minister); Bipin Rawat (Chief of Army Staff) Birender Singh Dhanoa (Chief of Air Staff)

Units involved
No. 15 Squadron "Cobras"; No. 16 Squadron "Black Panthers"; No. 24 Squadron "Blinders"; Combat Commanders School; No 29 Aggressor Squadron	No. 51 Squadron IAF; No. 154 Helicopter Unit, IAF

Strength
Strike aircraft 2 Dassault Mirage-IIIDA; 2 Dassault Mirage-VPA armed with H-4 SOW; 2 JF-17 Thunders armed with Mk. 83 REKs Escort & EW support Unspecified number of F-16 & JF-17 Thunder combat aircraft, Falcon DA-20 EW/ECM/ESM and Saab 2000 Erieye AEW&C aircraft	Unknown number of MiG-21, Su-30MKI and Mirage 2000 jets Air defense system on ground

Casualties and losses
Neutral Assessment: No aircraft lost Indian claim: 1 F-16 shot down Pakistani claim: No PAF aircraft shot down	Neutral Assessment: 1 MiG-21 shot down, pilot (Abhinandan Varthaman) captured. Pakistani claim: 1 MiG-21 shot down, pilot (Abhinandan Varthaman) captured and 1 Su-30MKI shot down. Indian claim: 1 MiG-21 shot down, pilot (Abhinandan Varthaman) captured, No Su-30MKI got shot down Friendly fire: 1 Mil Mi-17 shot down, 6 Indian Air Force personnel including Squadron leaders Siddharth Vashisht and Ninad Mandavgan and 1 civilian killed

On 27 February 2019, the Pakistan Air Force (PAF) conducted six airstrikes at multiple locations in Indian-administered Jammu and Kashmir (J&K). The airstrikes were part of the PAF military operation codenamed Operation Swift Retort and were conducted in retaliation to the Indian Air Force (IAF) airstrike in Balakot just a day before on 26 February.

It was the first time since 1971 that both countries' airforces had conducted airstrikes on each other's territory across the Line of Control (LoC). India conducted an airstrike in Balakot on 26 February while Pakistan responded by conducting airstrikes in Indian-administered Kashmir. Following Pakistan's airstrikes, Indian Air Force (IAF) jets started pursuing Pakistan Air Force (PAF) jets. In the resulting dogfight, Pakistan claimed to have shot down two Indian jets and captured one Indian pilot, Abhinandan Varthaman. Indian officials acknowledged that one IAF jet was lost. One IAF Mil Mi-17 helicopter was also lost due to a friendly fire incident in which six IAF personnel were killed including two squadron leaders, Siddarth Vashista and Ninad Mandavgane. Indian officials also claimed to have shot down a PAF F-16 jet. Pakistan rejected the Indian claim and said that the PAF did not suffer any losses in the dogfight. US count of PAF F-16 fleet found no F-16 was lost during PAF engagement with IAF.

== Background ==
=== Pulwama attack ===
On 14 February 2019, a convoy of vehicles carrying security personnel on the Jammu–Srinagar National Highway was attacked by Pakistan-based Jaish-e-Mohammed militant group's vehicle-borne suicide bomber at Lethpora in the Pulwama district, Indian-administered Jammu and Kashmir. The attack resulted in the deaths of 46 Central Reserve Police Force personnel and the attacker. The perpetrator of the attack was from Indian-administered Kashmir.

=== Balakot airstrike ===
The 2019 Balakot airstrike was a bombing raid conducted by Indian warplanes on 26 February 2019, in Balakot, Pakistan against an alleged terrorist training camp. Open source satellites imagery has revealed that no targets of consequence were hit. The following day, Pakistan shot down an Indian warplane and took its pilot prisoner. Indian anti-aircraft fire downed an Indian helicopter killing six or seven airmen on board, their deaths receiving perfunctory coverage by Indian media. India claimed that a Pakistani F-16 fighter jet was downed, but that claim has been shown to be false. The airstrike was used by India's ruling party to bolster its patriotic appeal in the general elections of April 2019.

== Airstrikes ==
Approximate locations of the airstrikes.

On 27 February 2019, Pakistan's Ministry of Foreign Affairs announced that Pakistan Air Force had conducted six airstrikes at non-military targets in Indian-administered Jammu and Kashmir. Pakistani officials stated that their fighter jets were able to lock onto the target with great accuracy. They also stated that they were ordered to drop their bombs in an open space where there was no human presence to avoid any human loss or collateral damage. According to Pakistani officials, the strike was meant to demonstrate Pakistan's capabilities without any further escalations. Pakistani Prime Minister Imran Khan said that the strikes were meant to send a message to India. Indian Air Vice Marshal RGK Kapoor refuted Imran Khan's claim, he stated that "Pakistan claims they intentionally dropped weapons in open space where there was no human presence, however, they dropped bombs on military targets (for IAF's airstrike on terrorist camps). Therefore the escalation has been done not by us by him [Pakistan Prime Minister Imran Khan]". The PAF jets entered into Indian air space over Jammu and Kashmir's Poonch and Nowshera sector to hit targets. The locations struck by the PAF jets were identified to be Nadian, Laam Jhangar, Kerri in Rajouri District and Hamirpur area of Bhimber Ghali in Poonch by Indian officials. Indian officials, however, denied that the target of Pakistani airstrike were non-military targets. Indian officials claimed that the Pakistan Air Force (PAF) jets had deliberately targeted military positions like the Indian army's 25th division headquarters, ammunition and supply depot. According to Indian Air Vice Marshal RGK Kapoor, the Pakistani airstrike missed their intended target. PAF jets were intercepted by an unspecified number of IAF jets. The IAF fleet was composed of MiG-21, Sukhoi Su-30MKI and Dassault Mirage 2000.

=== Initial planning ===
At 8:45 AM, Pakistani airspace was shut down for civilian flights and all commercial flights were cancelled. PAF aircraft took off about 30 minutes later coordinating the timing with the changeover of IAF AWACS. A combination of 25 aircraft including F-16 and Mirage 5 made their way towards Indian airspace but stayed within Pakistani airspace. Some of the aircraft went south towards Rajasthan to act as decoys.

=== Aerial engagement ===
The announcement was followed by a tweet of Director-General of the ISPR, Maj Gen. Asif Ghafoor, which revealed that the Pakistan Air Force had shot down two Indian aircraft after they encroached on Pakistan's airspace. The ISPR stated that the wreckage of one of the aircraft fell in Pakistan's Azad Kashmir while the other one fell in Indian-administered Jammu and Kashmir. The aircraft which crashed in Azad Kashmir was identified to be a Mikoyan-Gurevich MiG-21 flown by Wing commander Abhinandan Varthaman. He was captured by a Pakistan military unit who were present in the premises. The villagers at the ground told Pakistani newspaper Dawn that they saw two enemy jets catch fire, one of which was able to escape into Indian territory. However, Indian officials rejected Pakistani claims of shooting down IAF Su-30 MKI jets and said that they were an attempt by Pakistan to cover up the loss of its F-16. Indian sources claim that it is impossible to hide an aircraft crash as of now. Pakistan's director-general of Inter-Services Public Relations (the official spokesperson of the armed forces of Pakistan) initially stated that it captured more than one Indian pilot and that one was admitted to CMH hospital, but changed their statement after some time and to say only one pilot is in their custody. This was later clarified to have been a "mistake" caused by fog of war. Pakistan disclosed the names of the pilots who shot down the two Indian aircraft as Wing Commander Nauman Ali Khan and Squadron Leader Hassan Siddiqui, the former being credited for the downing of Varthaman's aircraft.

Later, Indian officials acknowledged that one IAF MiG-21 was shot down and its pilot was in the custody of Pakistan security forces. The Indian Air Force also claimed to have shot down one F-16 by Wing Commander Abhinandan Varthaman from his MiG-21 aircraft. However, Pakistani officials rejected India's claim. Pakistani officials said that "in today's day and age, it is impossible to hide downing of an aircraft". On the Air Force day, 8 October 2019, IAF reportedly flew the Su-30 MKI claimed to have been downed by the Pakistan Air Force.

=== Friendly fire ===
On the same day, around twenty minutes before the MiG-21 downing, an Indian Mil Mi-17 helicopter crashed, killing six Indian Air Force personnel and one civilian in the Budgam district. It was under the command of squadron leaders Siddarth Vashista and Ninad Mandavgane and crashed within ten minutes of take-off from the Srinagar air base. Four other IAF personnel were flight engineer Vishal Kumar Pandey, sergeant Vikrant Sehrawat, corporals Deepak Pandey and Pankaj Kumars that were killed along with two pilots. Indian defence ministry said it was an accident "during routine operation", but friendly fire was speculated to be the cause. Ajai Shukla reported in April 2019 that the court of inquiry constituted by IAF to investigate the incident, had concluded that an Indian missile battery had misidentified the helicopter as Pakistani and shot it down. By late May, after the conclusion of voting in 2019 Indian general election, IAF sources had begun unofficially acknowledging friendly fire as the cause and the Air Officer Commanding of Srinagar air base was removed from the position. Investigations, typically finished in three months, were said to require more time in this case as the metallurgical report hadn't been received yet. In October 2019, IAF confirmed that the helicopter was shot down by an Indian SPYDER surface-to-air missile and said that five personnel were held guilty for the lapses. The investigation found that the helicopter had not been identified as originating in Pakistan by the Integrated Air Command and Control System in Barnala and that it had been in touch with the Air Traffic Control. But the helicopter's Identification, friend or foe system, used to mark friendly aircraft, had been switched off due to interference with civilian transmissions and it had tried to land from outside the designated corridor of approach. IAF dismissed Group Captain Suman Roy Choudhry Chief Operations Officer (COO) of the Srinagar Air Force Station from his service in 2023 for his negligence during PAF strikes.

== Aftermath ==
=== India ===
The Ministry of External Affairs in a press conference confirmed that the PAF violated the LoC and entered Indian airspace through the Nowshera and Poonch sectors, shooting down one IAF jet and causing its pilot to go missing. India also claimed to have shot down one PAF F-16 Fighting Falcon, a claim that was denied by Pakistan saying no F-16 was used in the operation. Additionally, Indian officials rejected Pakistani claims of shooting down an Su-30MKI. Indian sources claim that it is impossible to hide an aircraft crash as of now.

On 28 February, Indian officials again alleged that two Pakistan Air Force (PAF) jets had violated Indian airspace. According to the Indian officials, the PAF jets were intercepted over the Poonch and Krishna Gati sectors. However, no aerial combat took place and PAF jets returned to their airspace.

In April 2019, a joint Indian Air Force-Indian Army BDS unit claimed to have carried out a bomb defusal operation in Mendhar, Rajouri, where they had successfully defused 3-4 unexploded H-4 SOW bombs that had been fired from PAF jets.

The Indian Air Force was displeased with the performance of the R-77 missiles since they were outranged by the AIM-120 AMRAAM used by Pakistan Air Force. Hence, they are planning to rearm using the I-Derby ER missile instead.

=== Pakistan ===
DG ISPR Asif Ghafoor later conducted a press conference, stating: "Since today morning activity has been ongoing at LoC. This morning PAF engaged six targets across LoC from within Pakistani airspace". He also said that the strikes were carried out to just demonstrate Pakistan's aggressive capabilities. Pakistan asserted that no F-16 was used in the operation. Initially, Pakistani officials stated that two IAF personnel were caught but later corrected their statement and stated that only one IAF personnel was in their custody. Pakistani officials stated that it was the fog of war that led them to believe that there were two IAF personnel in their custody.

Prime Minister Imran Khan addressed the nation saying that the sole purpose of our action was to convey that "if you can come into our country, we can do the same". Khan also offered India for peace talks.

=== United States ===
According to Foreign Policy journalist Lara Seligman, U.S. officials with direct knowledge of the matter asserted that the US has recently completed a physical count of Pakistan's F-16s and has found none missing. One US official also disagreed with India's claim that usage restrictions disallow Pakistan from employing F-16s in military encounters with India. The Washington Post, Indian newspaper Hindustan Times reported that a United States Department of Defense spokesman claimed that he was "not aware" of any such investigation that was conducted and stated, "As a matter of policy, the Department does not publicly comment on details of government-to-government agreements on end-use monitoring of US-origin defence articles." However, The Washington Post reported that like the Pentagon, the State Department has yet to issue any public statement on F-16 count. On the other hand, according to The National Bureau of Asian Research, "The Modi Government's public mischaracterizations of the February 2019 Balakot airstrike and subsequent air skirmishes, including subsequently debunked claims of a destroyed terrorist camp inside Pakistan and India's downing of a Pakistani F-16 jet, have already raised questions in the United States about New Delhi's credibility and communications strategy in the midst of an exceptionally dangerous regional context". Additionally, multiple international military observers also rebutted Indian claim of shooting down a F-16.

In December 2019, USNews reported that the United States had sent a letter to Pakistan Air Force in August expressing its concern about the alleged misuse of F-16s during the skirmish in February. The letter mentioned the State Department's confirmation that Pakistan had violated its agreement with the US by deploying F-16s and its complement of missiles to unauthorized forward air bases.

== Exhibit ==
A statue of the Indian pilot Abhinandan was installed in the Pakistan Air Force museum in an exhibit named Operation Swift Retort. The exhibit also displays the missing parts and wreckage of the MiG-21 as well as a tea mug.
