= National Defence Fund =

Indian government institution

National Defence Fund is an Indian Government institution, set up in the year 1962 to receive voluntary donations for the promotion and welfare of the members of the Indian Armed Forces (including paramilitary forces) and their dependents. Members of the executive committee include the Prime Minister of India as chairperson, Home Minister, Defence Minister and Finance Minister—Treasurer. Donations to the National Defence Fund are 100% tax exempt. Donations can be made through an online government portal also.

== Income and expenditure ==
The income and expenditure of the National Defence Fund for the period 2013 to 2019 is as follows (in crore rupees):

== Notable contributions ==
- Osman Ali Khan, Asaf Jah VII, the last Nizam of Hyderabad of the former Hyderabad State, made a donation of 5 tonnes of gold to the National Defence Fund in 1965.( Hindu 11 NOV 2018)
- BCCI, Indian team wears Army camouflage caps, donates match fee (₹1 crore, with the players contributing ₹8 lakh and the reserves ₹3 lakh each) to National Defence Fund
