= Ajai Shukla =

Indian soldier and journalist

Ajai Shukla is an Indian journalist and a retired colonel of Indian Army. He writes articles on defense policy, production and acquisition and currently works as consulting editor with Business Standard. He earlier worked with DD News and NDTV.
