= Lethapora =

Village in Jammu and Kashmir, India

Lethapora Lethapur Lalitpur Lyetpur
- Small Town
- Location in Jammu and Kashmir, India
- Coordinates: 33°57′50″N 74°57′50″E
- Country: India
- State: Jammu and Kashmir
- District: Pulwama
- Tehsil: Pampore
- Founder: Lalitaditya Muktapida
- Elevation: 1,620 m (5,310 ft)

Population (2011)
  - Total: 6,131
- Demonym(s): Lethapori, Lethapori, Lethaporia, Lethapuria, Lalitpuri, Lalitpuria

Languages
  - Official: Kashmiri, Urdu, Hindi, Dogri, English
- Census code: 002982

Lethapora (also known as Lethpora, Lyetpur and Lalitpur) is a village in the Pampore tehsil of the Pulwama district of Jammu and Kashmir, India. It has a long history as it was named after a king Lalitaditya Muktapida, who was a powerful ruler of the Karkota dynasty of Kashmir. It was first named as Lalitpur and later changed to Lethapora. It is one of the main markets for tourists and locals for Kashmiri dry fruits like walnuts, almonds, etc. You can get the world's finest saffron from here, which is available easily in the market. It mainly has three main markets, that is Upper Market (Her Bazar), Main Market, and Down Market (Bon Bazar). Upper market is like the corporate area of the village, which mainly has a mixture of shops like saffron and other dry fruit shops, restaurants, hotels, tea stalls, banks, schools, gym, showrooms, etc. In the Main Market, you will find basic shops selling fruits, vegetables, kirana, and other basics, and in the Down Market, it mostly has saffron shops along with other shops, and restaurants

== Location ==
Lethapora is located on the banks of the Jhelum River. It lies at the foothills of the south-western corner of the Zabarwan mountain range, locally known as Vastoorwun. The Jammu–Srinagar National Highway passes through the village. It is 21 kilometres (13 mi) from the summer capital, Srinagar, to the south.

== Demographics ==
According to the 2011 census of India, Lethapora has 828 households, with over population of more than 6100, which is the second highest in the district of Pulwama. It is the second-largest village in Pulwama in terms of population. The average literacy rate (i.e., the literacy rate of the population excluding children aged 6 and below) is 70.53%. Most people in the village are associated with agriculture. Saffron is the main crop and the main source of income for the village. The total geographical area of the village is 286.1 hectares (2.861 km^{2}; 707 acres).

== Education ==
Lethapora has the average literacy rate of 70.53% according to 2011 census. 3,470 males and 2,661 females. It is hub of education for nearby villages like Hajibal, Banderpora, Goripora, Barsu, Oudipora, Jawbehara, Chandhara, etc. as this village has the largest network of schools.

Lethapora is a school cluster in Pampora block of Pulwama district in Jammu And Kashmir Which is having about 22 Schools in it. In which 9 are present in Lethapora. This cluster include all private and government schools of this area. Here is List all the government and private schools of this cluster is listed below.

| 1 | IQRA INTERNATIONAL SCHOOL LETHPORA |
| 2 | M.I.E.I CHANDHARA |
| 3 | HS BARSOO |
| 4 | BPS NEW COLONY LETHAPORA |
| 5 | ALFAJAR INTERNATIONAL SCHOOL BARSOO |
| 6 | H.SEC. SCHOOL LETHPORA |
| 7 | BPS DALIHARA COLONY BARSOO |
| 8 | BPS HATIWARA |
| 9 | BPS UDHIPORA |
| 10 | MOTHER LAP LETHPORA |
| 11 | BPS NAGBAL |
| 12 | HS CHANDHARA |
| 13 | BPS LETHPORA |
| 14 | PS SARHORA CHANDHARA |
| 15 | HANFIA ISLAMIA |
| 16 | BPS KHEIRPATH |
| 17 | PS KHUTU |
| 18 | C.E.M. SCHOOL LETHPORA |
| 19 | FIRDOUSI E.M.HIGH SCHOOL |
| 20 | SYED JAFAR-UDIN ISLAMIA SCHOOL |
| 21 | MS LETHPORA |
| 22 | GMS BARSOO |

Apart from this, it has Green Valley College of Education. Pampore Degree College, Islamic University of Science and Technology (IUST), and AIIMS are just 8 km (5.0 mi) away from Lethapora.
