= Abhinandan Varthaman =

Indian fighter pilot (born 1983)

Group Captain Abhinandan Varthaman VrC
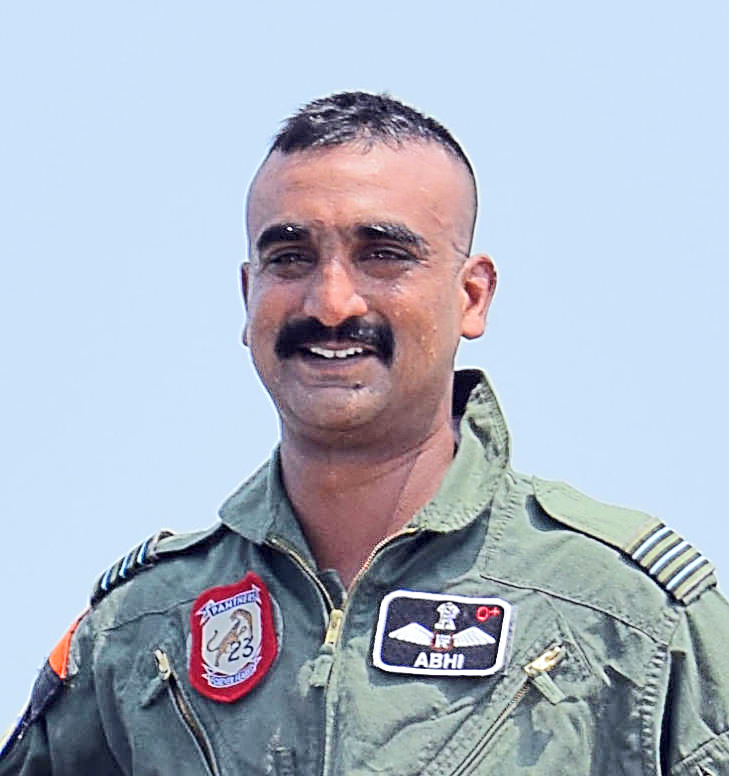
- Varthaman in September 2018
- Born: 21 June 1983 (age 43); Tamil Nadu, India
- Education: Sainik School, Amaravathinagar; National Defence Academy
- Military career
- Allegiance: India
- Branch: Indian Air Force
- Service years: 2004–2026
- Rank: Group Captain
- Service number: 27981
- Conflicts: 2019 India–Pakistan standoff; 2019 Jammu and Kashmir airstrikes (POW)
- Awards: Vir Chakra

Group Captain Abhinandan Varthaman VrC (born 21 June 1983) is an Indian Air Force officer and fighter pilot. He flew a MiG-21 Bison during an aerial engagement on 27 February 2019, when his aircraft was shot down by the Pakistan Air Force. He was captured by the Pakistan Army after landing in Pakistani territory, approximately 7 km (4.3 miles) from the Line of Control. On 1 March 2019, he was released and returned to India.

== Career and personal life ==
Abhinandan Varthaman was born on 21 June 1983 in a Tamil Jain family, in Chennai, Tamil Nadu. His family is from Thirupanamoor, a village about 19 km (12 miles) from Kanchipuram. His father, Simhakutty Varthaman is retired Air Marshal, and his mother is a doctor.

Varthaman was educated at Sainik School, Amaravathinagar. He graduated from the National Defence Academy and was commissioned into the combat (fighter) stream of the IAF as a flying officer on 19 June 2004. He was trained at the IAF centres in Bathinda and Halwara, promoted to flight lieutenant on 19 June 2006, and to squadron leader on 8 July 2010. Varthaman was a Su-30MKI fighter pilot before being assigned to the MiG-21 Bison squadron. He was promoted to wing commander on 19 June 2017 and to group captain on 1 December 2021.

Varthaman is married and lives in Chennai. His wife, Tanvi Marwaha is a retired Squadron leader. He and his wife have two children.

== Dogfight and capture ==
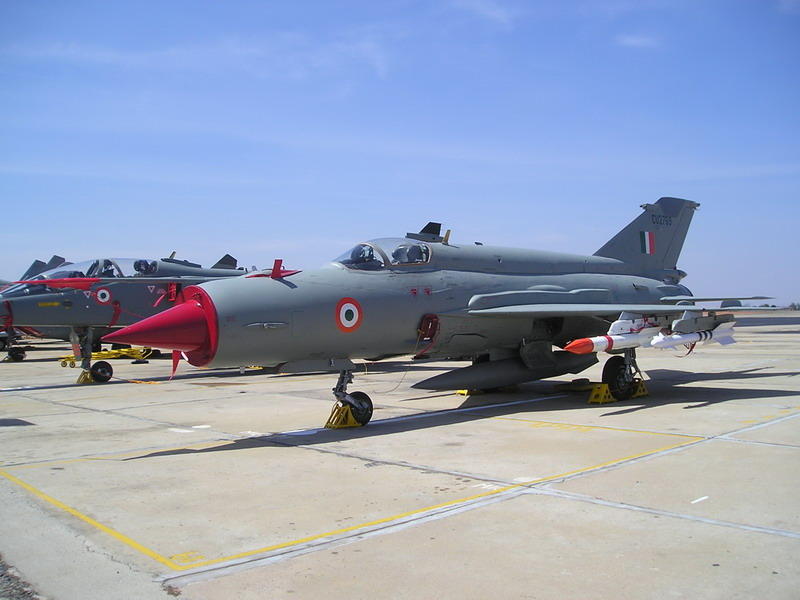
A MiG-21 Bison of the Indian Air Force.

On 27 February 2019, Varthaman was flying a MiG-21 as part of a sortie that was scrambled to intercept incoming PAF fighter jets, which were on their way, to conduct airstrikes in Jammu and Kashmir. After this, his radio and radars were jammed by Pakistani air defence moments before he was shot down by an F-16 of the Pakistan Air Force piloted by Wing Commander Noman Ali Khan. Varthaman ejected from his plane and landed in the village of Horran in Pakistan Administered Kashmir, approximately 7 km (4.3 miles) from the Line of Control.

Local villagers said Varthaman was identified as an Indian pilot by the Indian flag on his parachute. Upon landing, Varthaman asked the villagers whether he was in India or Pakistan, to which a boy lied by saying "India." In response, Varthaman reportedly chanted "Bharat Mata ki Jai," to which the locals responded with "Pakistan Zindabad." He then fired warning shots before attempting to flee. The villagers were able to subdue and manhandle Varthaman, before the Pakistan Army captured him and took him into custody as a prisoner of war.

Later that day, the Indian Ministry of External Affairs confirmed that an Indian pilot was missing in action after a MiG-21 Bison fighter aircraft was lost, while engaging with Pakistani jets.

A statement released by the IAF stated that before the crash, Varthaman had shot down a PAF Lockheed Martin F-16. At a media briefing on 2 March 2019, nearly two days after the aerial engagement between PAF and IAF, the IAF displayed the parts of AIM-120 AMRAAM missiles, which could be used by the PAF's F-16. An AMRAAM indicated that Pakistan used F-16s and most likely shot these missiles at another fighter jet, within Indian territory.

The Indian Air Force stated it had identified the electronic signatures of the aircraft involved in the skirmish and confirmed the use of F-16s. Indian media claimed that under a U.S.-Pakistan agreement, Pakistan could only use F-16s against terrorists. However, Foreign Policy quoted a U.S. official denying any such restriction. Pakistan's Inter-Services Public Relations (ISPR) also refuted the use of F-16s in the incident.

In April 2019, Foreign Policy, citing two anonymous U.S. defense officials, reported that an audit found no Pakistani F-16s missing. Earlier, Pakistan rejected the Indian claim and said that the PAF did not suffer any losses in the dogfight. US count of PAF F-16 fleet found no F-16 was lost during PAF engagement with IAF. Defence and military analysts found India's claim to based on circumstantial evidence.

=== Videos ===
Videos and images released by Pakistani authorities showed Varthaman being taken into custody from a mob by Pakistani soldiers and being interrogated while tied and blindfolded with a bloody face repeating what was done to Capt Saurabh Kalia before the 1999 Kargil war. Other videos showed him receiving first aid and being further interrogated over tea. The media received a mixed reception; some commentators criticised the reports as a "vulgar display" while others praised the intervention of the Pakistani soldiers when Varthaman was in the hands of the mob and was being beaten. The release of the videos was suspected of being a violation of the Geneva Conventions and were deleted by Pakistani authorities after they went viral. Pakistani legal, diplomatic and military experts gave differing opinions on the applicability of the Geneva Conventions in this case.

== Repatriation ==
On 28 February 2019, Imran Khan, the prime minister of Pakistan, announced at a joint sitting of the Parliament of Pakistan, that the government had decided to release Varthaman the next day as a "gesture of peace". Some news sources reported that India and Pakistan "came perilously close to firing missiles at each other on February 27, with Prime Minister Narendra Modi deciding to up the ante after the capture of Varthaman by Pakistan, and Research and Analysis Wing secretary Anil Dhasmana communicating to his Pakistan counterpart Inter Services Intelligence chief Lieutenant General Asim Munir that there would be an escalation in the Indian offensive if the pilot was harmed." Shah Mehmood Qureshi, the Foreign Minister of Pakistan, said his government announced the release of the IAF Wing Commander out of a desire for peace and that there was no compulsion or pressure on Pakistan, as was implied by the Indian media. However, The New York Times reported that several outside countries including United States and China had been urging Pakistan to release the Indian pilot to de-escalate the crisis.

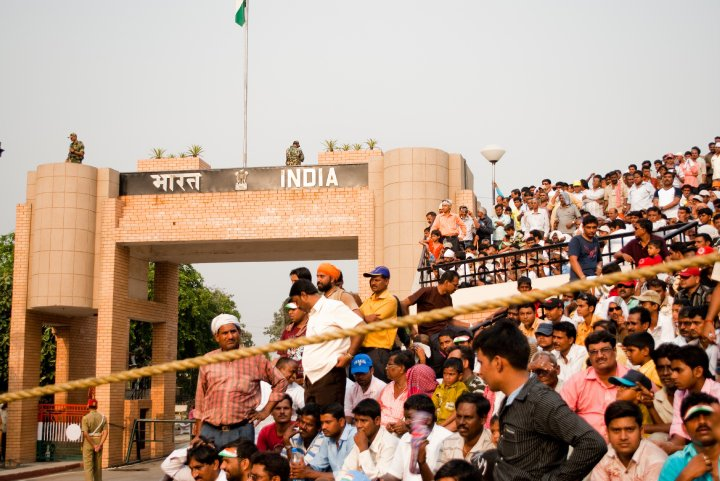
Wagah border

Varthaman crossed the India–Pakistan border at Wagah on 1 March 2019. At a rally, the Indian Prime Minister Narendra Modi welcomed Varthaman's release, saying the nation was proud of him. A demeaning video of Varthaman was released by the PAF to the Pakistani media hours before his release. IAF later said it had been filmed while Varthaman was under duress. A medical check-up upon his return located multiple bruises and a fractured rib but no 'significant injuries'. Varthaman said the Pakistani authorities did not physically torture him but subjected him to considerable "mental harassment". Pakistan said he was treated in accordance with the Geneva Conventions.

After the government's decision to release Varthaman was announced, a petition was filed before the Islamabad High Court (IHC) seeking an injunction to stop the process but the court dismissed it on the same day. The petition argued Varthaman must be released only after the cessation of active hostilities, as per the Geneva Conventions, since the Indian pilot “was arrested when he was on a mission against Pakistan”. The petition was rejected by the Islamabad High Court, citing the consensus of the parliamentarians and that "When all the parliamentarians agree at a point...[a] debate over it is unnecessary". In addition the IHC Chief Justice Minallah also stated that the courts do not have the power to intervene in foreign affairs, according to a Supreme Court verdict in 2014.

== Subsequent developments ==
On 28 October 2020, senior Pakistan Muslim League-Nawaz (PML-N) leader Sardar Ayaz Sadiq recalled a high-level meeting of Pakistan's civilian and military leadership regarding the release of Varthaman. Sadiq said, "Legs were shaking and forehead perspiring," referring to the demeanor of senior officials during the meeting. He claimed that then-Foreign Minister Shah Mahmood Qureshi pleaded for Abhinandan's release, allegedly saying, "For God’s sake, let him go back now because India is attacking Pakistan at 9 PM tonight." Sadiq suggested that the decision to release the pilot was made under pressure, implying fear of imminent Indian retaliation. He further alleged, "India was not planning to attack... They just wanted to kneel before India and send back Abhinandan." His comments sparked significant political backlash, with Interior Minister Ijaz Ahmed Shah warning of possible treason charges and posters labeling Sadiq a "traitor" appearing in Lahore. A citizen submitted a request to the Civil Lines Police Station in Lahore seeking a treason case against former Sadiq, alleging he supported the Indian military and spread "false propaganda" against the Pakistan Army during a TV program aired on October 29.

== Legacy and honors ==
Akhil Bharatiya Digambar Jain Mahasamiti chairperson Manidra Jain announced Varthaman would be awarded the Bhagwan Mahavir Ahimsa Puraskar on 17 April 2019, the date of Mahavir Jayanti. In August that same year, he was presented with the Vir Chakra gallantry award.

== In popular culture ==
=== "The tea is fantastic" (internet meme) ===
In 2019, after Varthaman was captured by Pakistani forces, a video of him taken by a soldier went viral in which he was seen being interrogated while drinking Pakistani tea. The interrogator asked him different questions about his health and how he was treated to which he acknowledged the humane treatment by the Pakistani military. The interrogator then asks if he was enjoying his tea, to which Varthaman replied: "The tea is fantastic". This statement of Varthaman went viral and turned into an internet meme in the Pakistani online community.

=== Moustache style ===
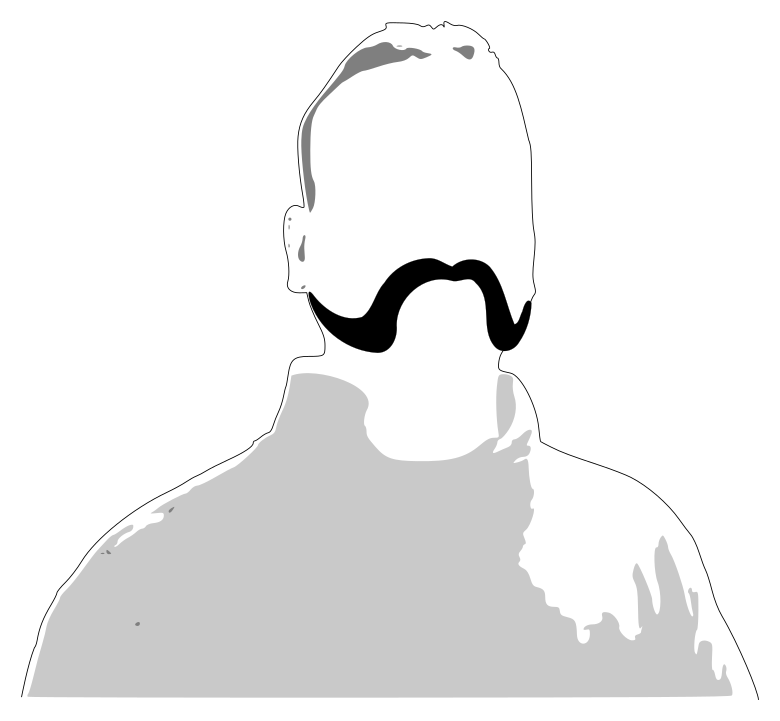
The Varthaman style, popular in India

Varthaman's style of moustache has become popular in India and is widely called the "Varthaman style". Actor Ranveer Singh's barber, Darshan Yewalekar, has quoted saying that "the beard sported by the IAF pilot will soon be called India's very own Varthaman style." The style is similar to a combination of gunslinger moustaches and mutton chops worn by Franz Joseph I of Austria. It resembles the moustache worn by actor Suriya in the Singam film series and Rajinikanth's moustache in Petta (2019).

A number of companies used the moustache in their advertisements. Dairy company Amul produced a video showing a young girl wearing an Varthaman-shaped milk moustache. The advertisement was posted on Twitter and received more than 170,000 views within 24 hours. Pizza Hut also posted a tweet showing the Varthaman moustache on 3 March 2019.

=== In media ===
Varthaman was played by Vivek Oberoi in the 2020 Bollywood movie Balakot: The True Story and by Prasanna in then 2024 JioCinema web series Ranneeti: Balakot & Beyond.

== Awards and decorations ==

Vir Chakra	Wound Medal		General Service Medal
Samanya Seva Medal	Special Service Medal	Siachen Glacier Medal	Sainya Seva Medal
High Altitude Service Medal	75th Anniversary Independence Medal	20 Years Long Service Medal	9 Years Long Service Medal
