= Islam in South Africa =

South African Muslims مسلمين جنوب افريقيا
Total population
- c. ~892,685 (2016 est.) (1.6% of the population) ▲

Regions with significant populations
- Throughout South Africa

Religions
- Majority: 95% Sunni Islam; Minority: 5% Shia and others

Languages
- Urdu, Arabic, Afrikaans Regional languages Punjabi, Sindhi, Gujarati, Kashmiri, Turkish, Malay Sacred and auxiliary language Arabic

South Africa is a Christian majority nation with Islam being a minority religion, practised by roughly 2% of the total population. Islam in South Africa has grown in three different phases. The first phase brought the earliest Muslims as part of the involuntary migration of slaves, artisans, political prisoners, and political exiles from the Dutch East Indies to the Cape Colony from 1652 to 1800. The second phase was the arrival of indentured labourers from British India to work in the sugar-cane fields in Natal from 1860 to 1911. Of the approximately 176,000 Indians of all faiths who were transported to the Natal province, almost 7–10% of the first shipment were Muslims.

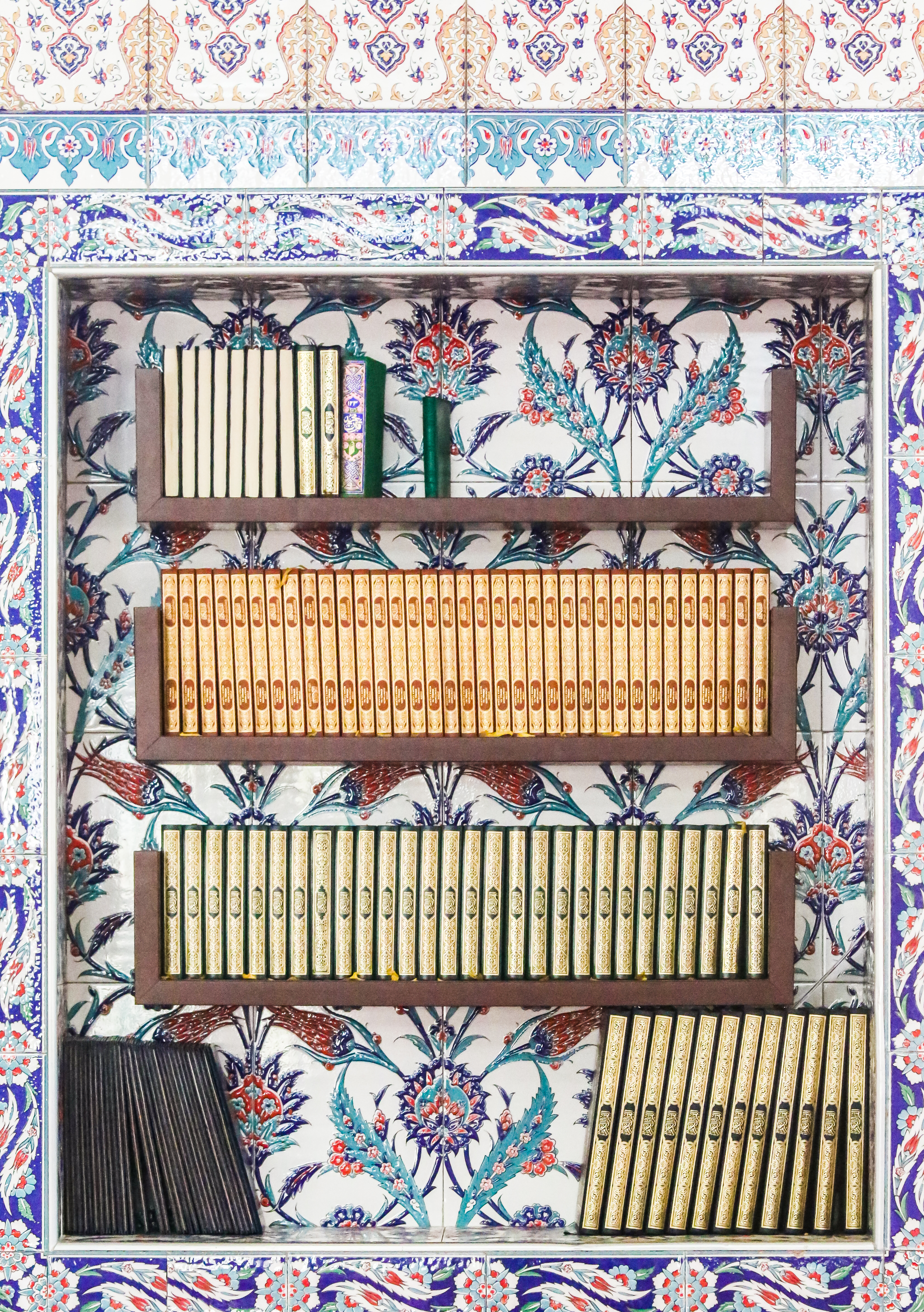
Islamic texts in the Nizamiye Mosque in Midrand

The third phase has been marked by a wave of African Muslims following the end of apartheid in 1994. Recent figures put the number of these immigrants at approximately between 75,000 and 100,000. In addition, a considerable number of Muslims from South Asia have also arrived as economic migrants. Although the majority of Muslims are Sunni, smaller numbers are Shia, particularly in Cape Town.

== History ==
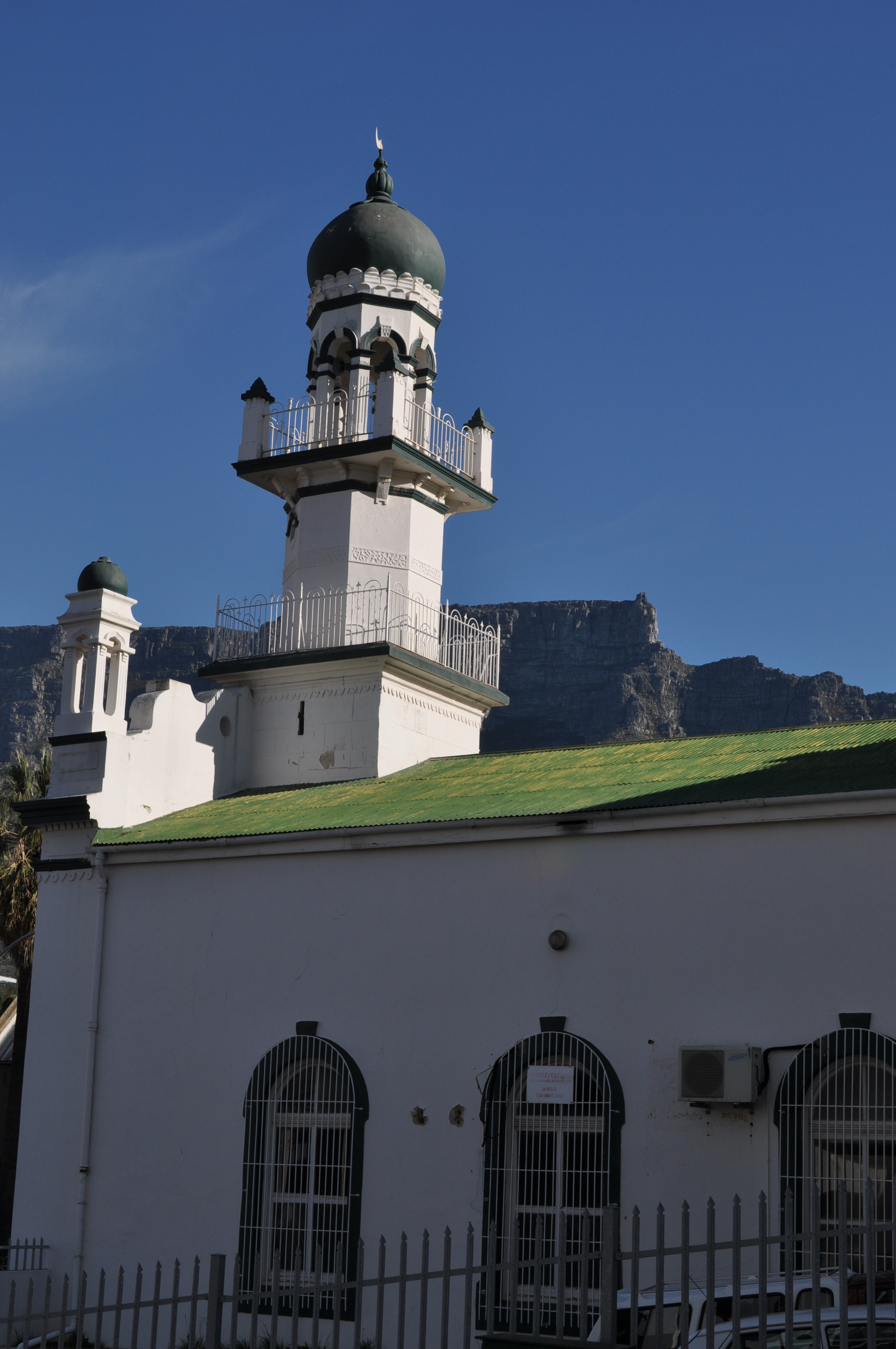
Mosque in Cape Town

=== The VOC period ===
In the 17th century, the Dutch controlled East Indies and the Cape. Free Muslim labourers (Mardyckers), banished rebels and slaves were taken to the Cape from Dutch East Indies (modern day Indonesia) as free workers, and as slaves. A significant number of slaves from India were also Muslims.

The first recorded arrival of free Muslims known as Mardyckers is in 1658. Mardycka or Maredhika implies freedom. The Mardyckers were people from Amboyna in the southern Moluccas and were brought to the Cape to defend the newly established settlement against the indigenous people, and also to provide labour in the same way that they had been employed at home, first by the Portuguese and later by the Dutch, in Amboyna. Jan Van Riebeeck had requested that the Mardyckers be sent to the Cape as a labour force. The Mardyckers were prohibited from openly practising their religion: Islam. This was in accordance with the Statute of India (drafted by Van Dieman in 1642) which stated in one of its placaats [statutes]: "No one shall trouble the Amboinese about their religion or annoy them; so long as they do not practise in public or venture to propagate it amongst Christians and heathens. Offenders to be punished with death, but should there be amongst them those who had been drawn to God to become Christians, they were not to be prevented from joining Christian churches." The same Placaat was re-issued on 23 August 1657 by Governor John Maetsuycker probably in anticipation of the advent of the Mardyckers to the Cape of Good Hope. The placaat applied to the Cape as part of the Dutch Colonial Empire.

During the late seventeenth and early eighteenth century the Dutch continued to exile Muslim leaders from Dutch East Indies to the Cape. Many "Indiaanen" and "Mohammedaanen" Muslim political prisoners brought from East Asia were imprisoned on Robben Island. 1667 saw the arrival of first Muslim political exiles banished by the Dutch to the Cape. These political exiles or Orang Cayen were Muslim men of wealth and influence who were banished to the Cape from their homeland in the East because the Dutch feared them as a threat to their political and economic hegemony. The first political exiles were the rulers of Sumatra. They were Sheikh Abdurahman Matabe Shah and Sheikh Mahmood. Both were buried in Constantia. From the very outset the Cape authorities accommodated the exiles away from Cape Town as they feared the exiles would escape. A tomb for these political exiles has been erected on "Islam Hill" in Constantia in the Cape. Sheikh Abdurahman Matebe Shah used his exile to consolidate the teaching of Islam among slaves in the Cape.

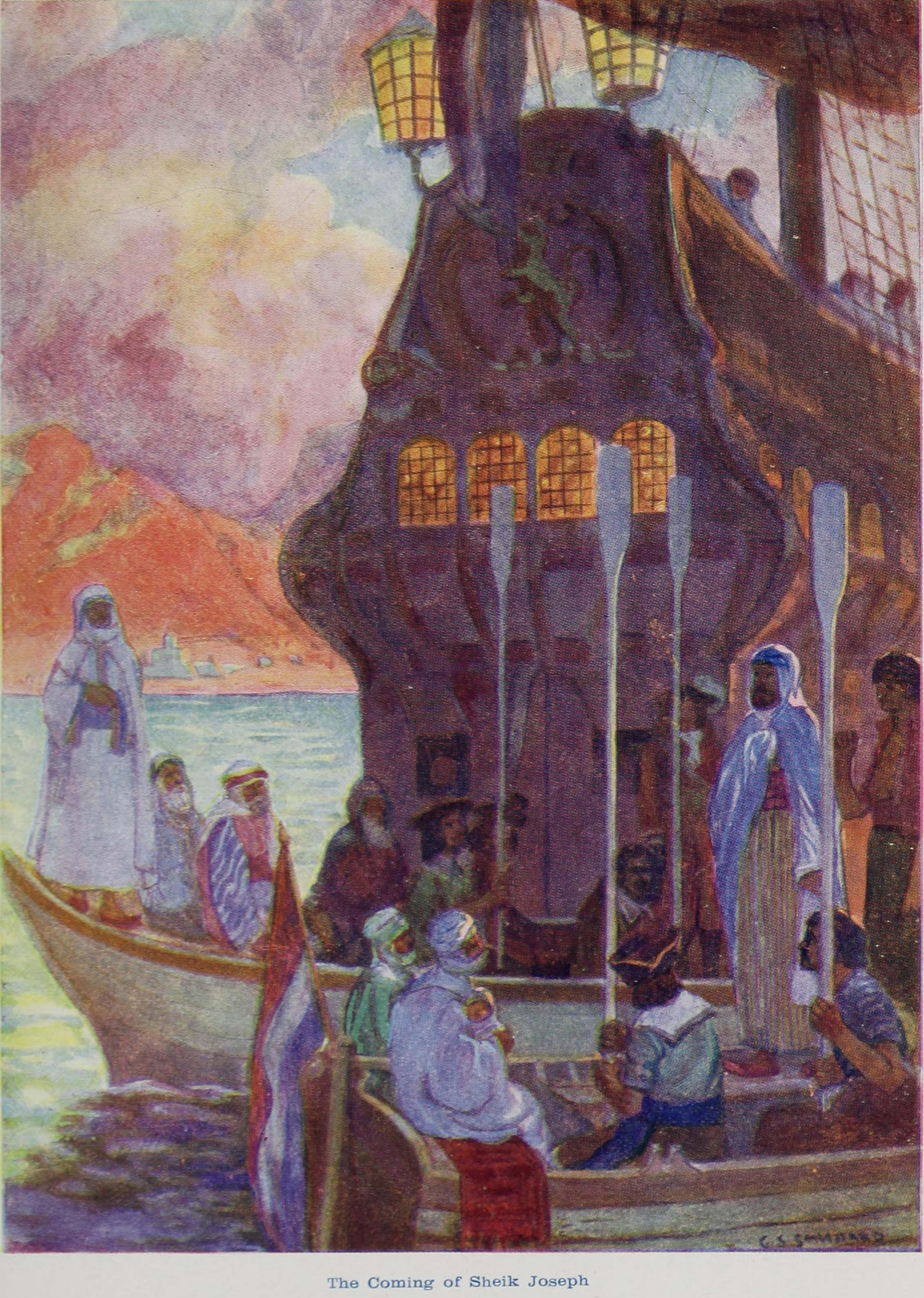
The Coming of Sheik Joseph (1909) by G.S. Smithard and J.S. Skelton

The next Orang Cayen was Sheikh Yusuf of Makassar who arrived on board 'De Voetboog' on 2 April 1694 along with his family and followers. They were housed on a farm in Zandvleit, near the mouth of the Eerste River in the Cape, far from Cape Town, on 14 June 1694. The company's attempt to isolate Shaykh Yusuf at Zandvleit did not succeed. On the contrary, Zandvleit turned out to be the rallying point for 'fugitive' slaves and other exiles from the East. It was here that the first cohesive Muslim community in South Africa was established. Since the Sheikh and his followers hailed from Macassar, the district around Zandvliet is still known today as Macassar.

Among the political exiles were Tuan Guru, first chief imam in South Africa, and Sheikh Madura, who was exiled in the 1740s and died on Robben Island; his kramat (shrine) is still there today. Sa'id Alowie (Sayyid 'Alawi), popularly known as Tuan Sa'id, of Mokha in Yemen, Arabia, arrived at the Cape in 1744 with Hadjie Matarim. They were banished to the Cape by the Dutch and were incarcerated on Robben Island. On his release from Robben Island Tuan Sa'id settled at the Cape where he worked as a police constable – an occupation which gave him ample opportunities for visiting slave quarters at night to teach. Tuan Sa'id is known for his active Da'wah (missionary endeavour) amongst the slaves in the Slave Lodge. He is generally regarded as the first official imam of the Cape Muslims.

In 1767 Prince Abdullah Kadi Abu Salaam of Tidore, Indonesia, was exiled to the Cape. He wrote a copy of the Quran from memory during his incarceration, and the volume is still preserved in Cape Town. He was released from jail in 1793 and establish a madrasah or Islamic school the same year. It is the first madrasah in the country and extremely popular among the slaves and the Free Black community. It played an important role in converting many slaves to Islam. It was also at this madrasah that the literary teaching of Arabic-Afrikaans emerged. It was through his work at the madrasah that he gained the appellation Tuan Guru, meaning mister teacher.

In 1793 the growth of the community encouraged Cape Town's Muslims to petition the VOC for permission to build a mosque. Tuan Guru became the first imam of the first mosque established at the Cape, the Auwal Mosque. Islam was a popular religion among the slaves – its tradition of teaching enabled literate slaves to gain better positions in their masters' households, and the religion taught its followers to treat their own slaves well.

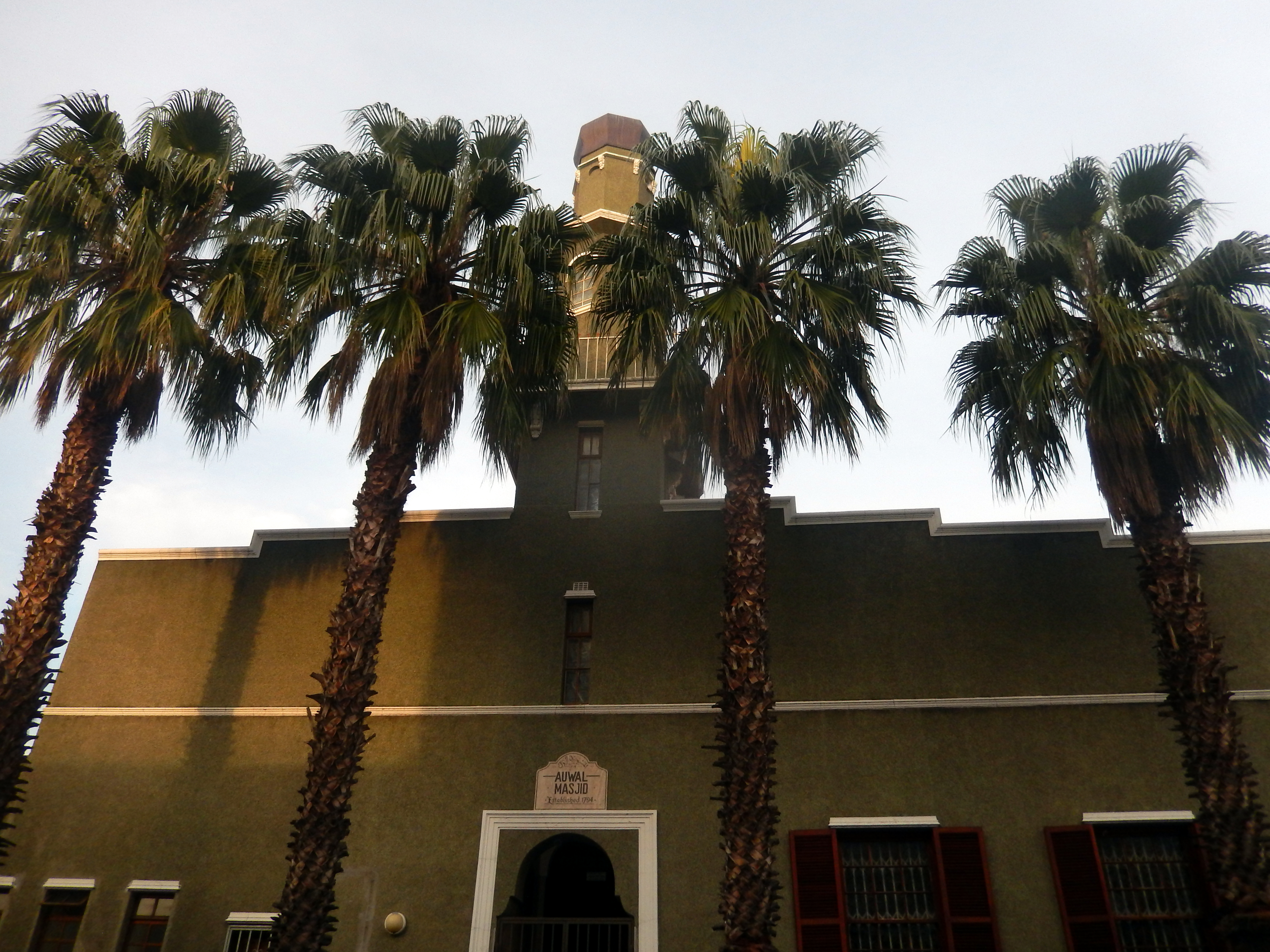
The Auwal Mosque, oldest mosque in South Africa, constructed in 1794; 232 years ago

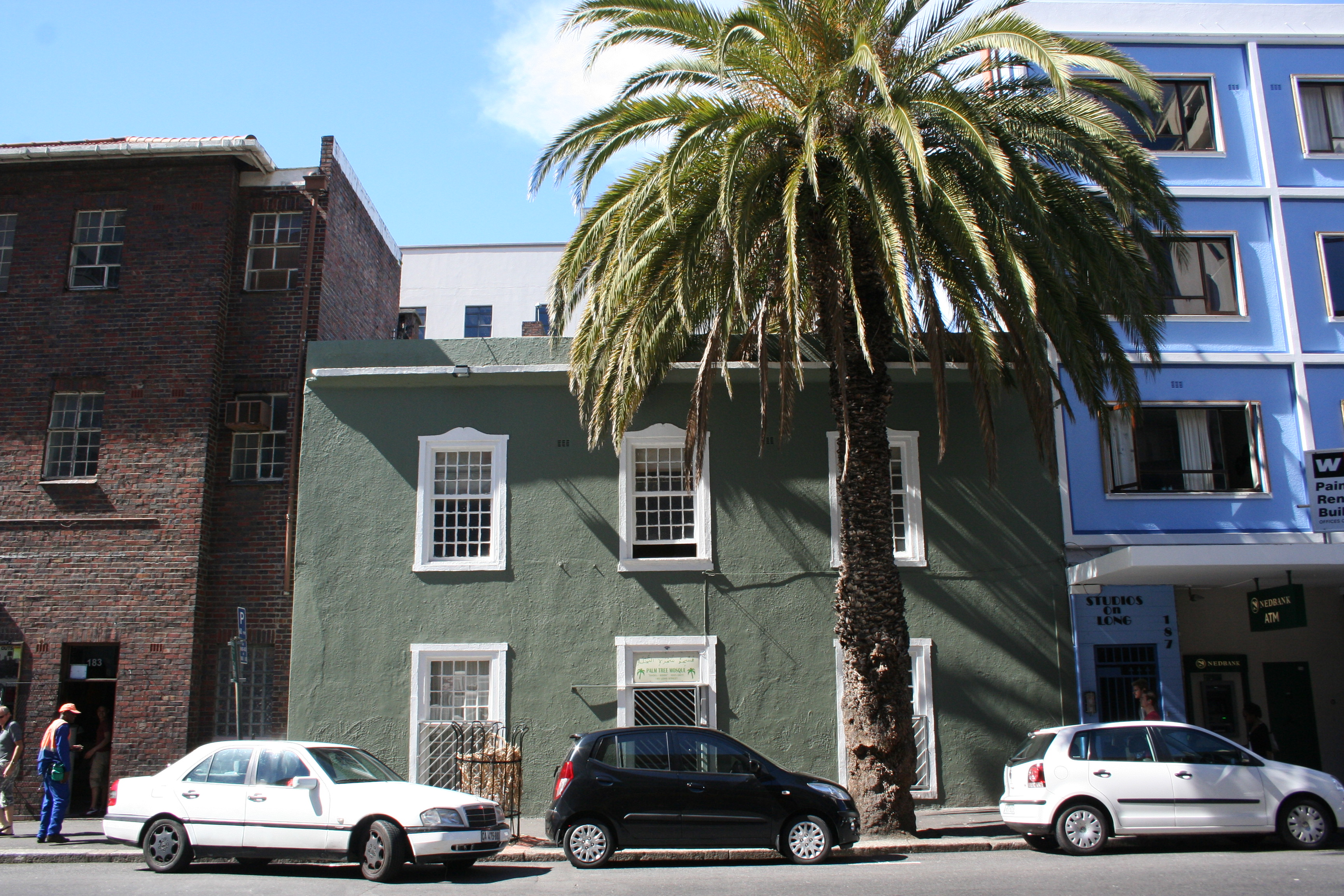
The Palm Tree Mosque, second oldest mosque in South Africa; building constructed in 1788 (238 years ago), and established as a mosque in 1807; 219 years ago

=== Arrival of Indian Muslims ===
In the 1800s there were two groups of Muslims that emigrated to South Africa from South Asia. The first began with a wave of immigration by indentured labourers from South India in the 1860s. These labourers were brought to South Africa by the British. 7–10% of these labourers were Muslim. The second group of immigrants were merchants or traders ("Passenger Indians") that arrived from North India and settled in Natal, the Transvaal and the Cape. The first mosque in Natal, Jumuah Musjid, was built in Grey Street in Durban in 1881. By 1911, 152,641 Indians had come to Natal.

==== Deobandis ====
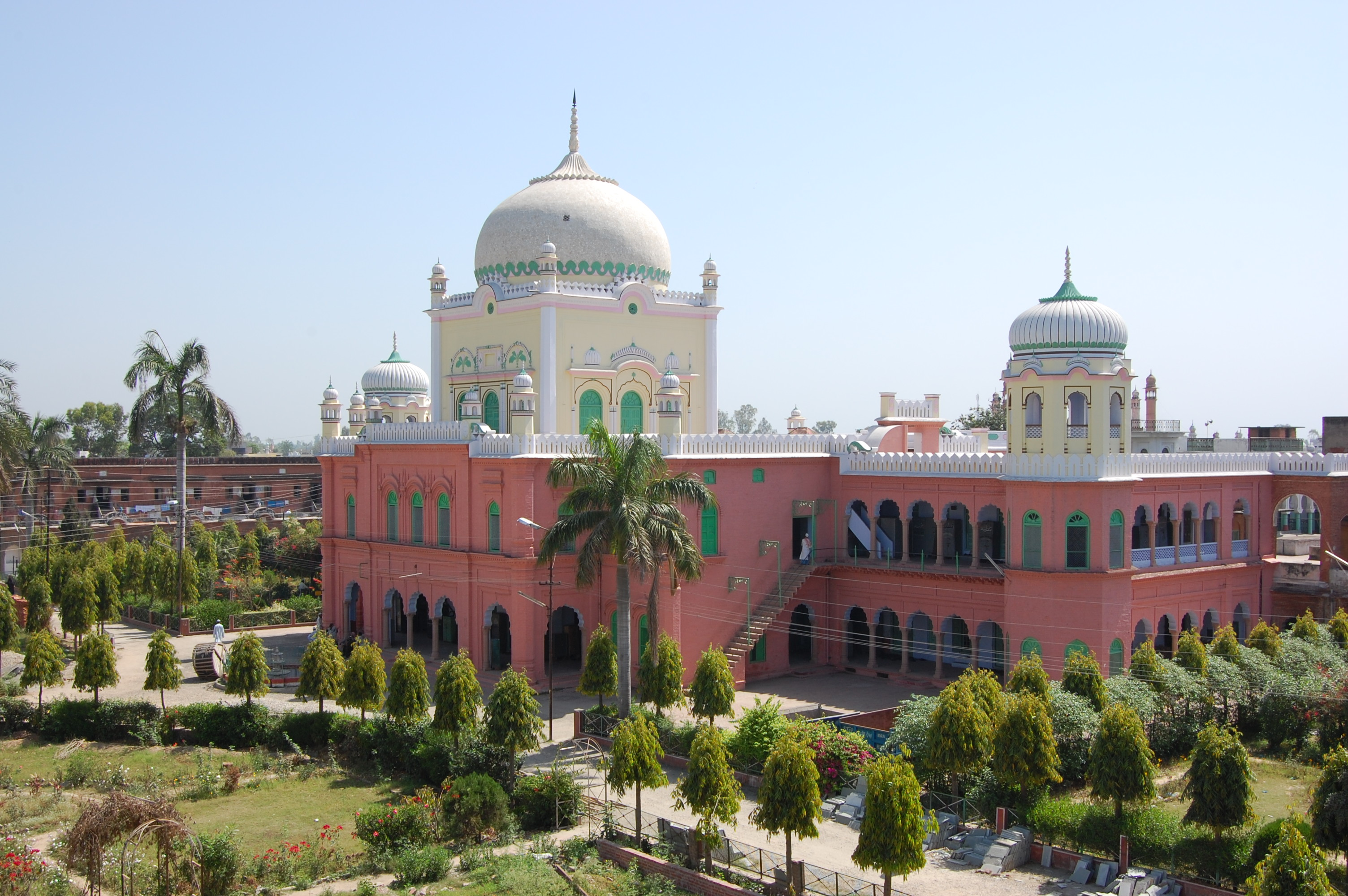
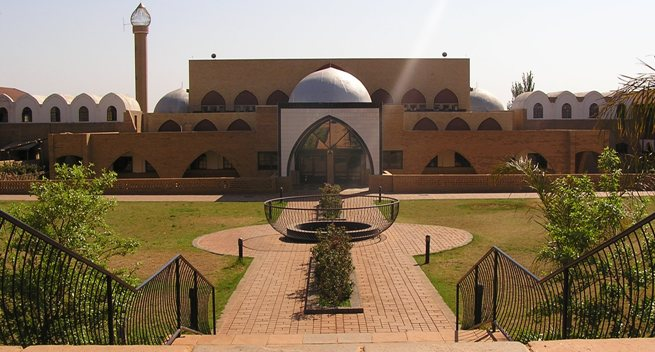
Darul Uloom Deoband, Darul Uloom Zakariyya

Darul Uloom Deoband was established in 1866 in the Saharanpur district of Uttar Pradesh, India, as part of the anti-British movement. It gave rise to a traditional conservative Sunni movement known as the Deobandi movement. The Deobandi Movement has an international presence today, with its full-fledged manifestation in South Africa, a country where the movement was initiated through the Indian Gujarati merchant class. The Islamic education system of the Deobandi movement, as well as the necessary components of social and political organizations such as Tablighi Jamaat, Sufism and Jamiat, are fully functioning effectively in South Africa, as they do in India. Madrasas in South Africa provide Islamic higher education and are now centers for Islamic education for foreigners who are interested in receiving a Deobandi-style education. Many of their graduates, especially from Western countries such as the United Kingdom and the United States, are Western students. Some of South African madrasas are recognized globally, providing fatwa services. South Africa is now known for producing exceptional Islamic literature through translation and compilation. Similarly, the Tabligh Jamaat is a hub in South Africa that spreads throughout South and East Africa. Graduates of South African madrassas spend their time in the path of the Tabligh Jamaat. Through the work of several spiritual personalities of the Deobandis, the tradition of Deoband's Tasawwuf (Sufism) has taken root in South Africa. Among them are Zakariyya Kandhlawi, Masihullah Khan, Mahmood Hasan Gangohi and Asad Madni. South African Deobandi Muslims have many important and influential educational and socio-political organizations that educate the people and play an important role in religious and social activities. Among them are Jamiatul Ulama South Africa and the Muslim Judicial Council.

=== Barelvis ===
The Barelvi movement has presence in various cities and town of South Africa where they have build network of Madarsas and Mosques. In South Africa debate with Tablighi Jama'at was called as Sunni-Tablighi controversy. The movement is represented by Sunni Jamiatul Ulema (SJU) which was founded in 1979. It was established to address the various social, welfare, educational and spiritual needs of the community and to preserve and to promote the teachings of the Barelvis. The Imam Ahmed Raza Academy is a seminary and non-governmental organisation and a publishing house based in Durban, South Africa. It was established on 5 July 1986 by Sheikh Abdul Hadi Al-Qaadiri Barakaati, a graduate of Darul Uloom Manzar-e-Islam, Bareilly Shareef, India. The objective is to propagate Islam in South Africa.

=== After apartheid ===
After South Africa became a democracy in 1994, there has been a growing number of Muslim migrants from South Asia and North Africa; however, their numbers are fairly low. Most of the non-South African Muslims are urban dwellers and thus live in or near Cape Town, Durban, Port Elizabeth, East London, Kimberley, Pretoria or Johannesburg.

=== New rise in conversions ===
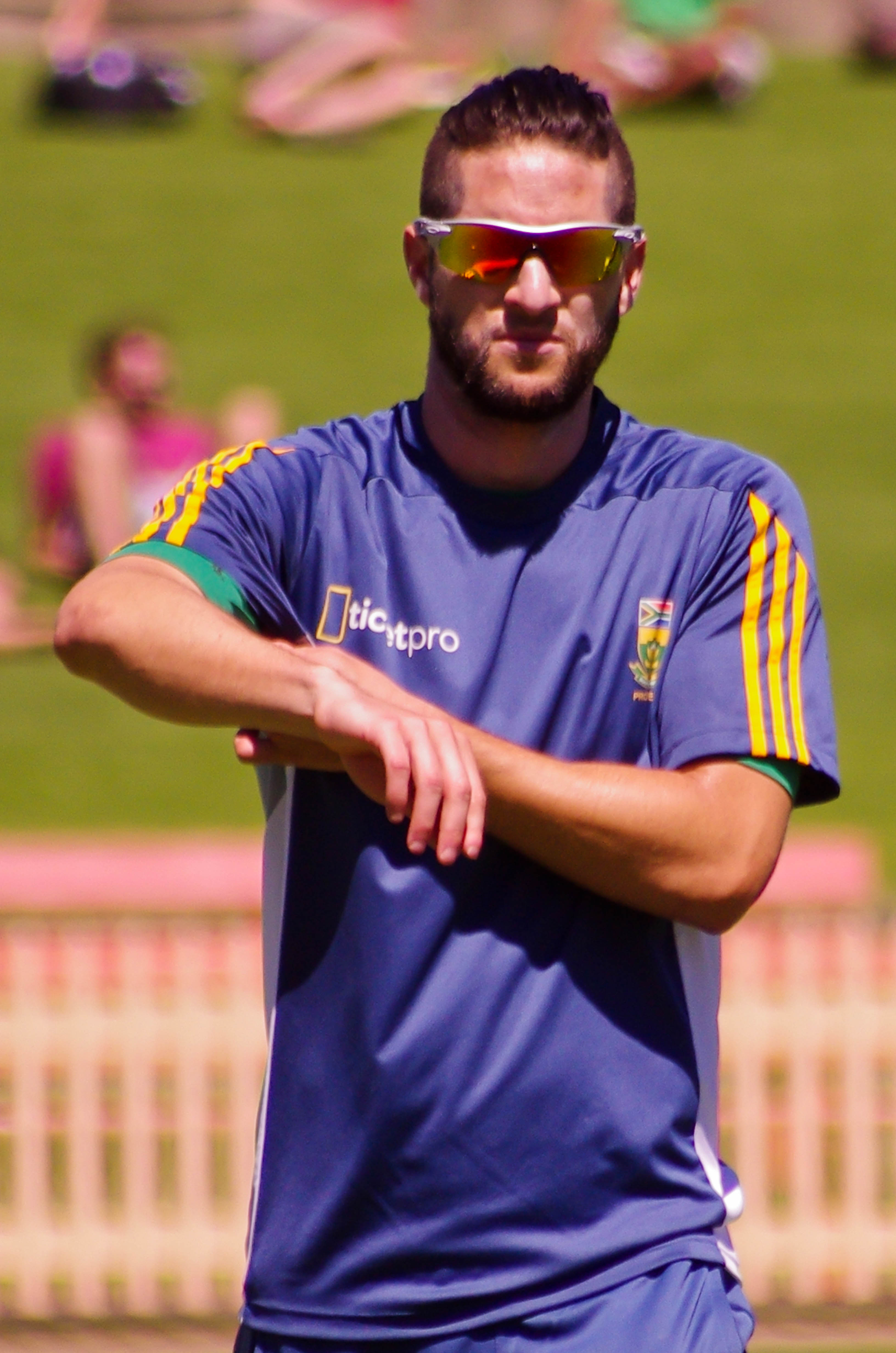
Wayne Parnell, cricketer with the South African team, converted to Islam in January 2011

Even though organisations such as Discover Islam, IPCI, the Islamic Dawah Movement of South Africa, and the Africa Muslim Agency have been eager to proselytise in the region, there have been other civic organisations such as the MYMSA and the Call of Islam who considered other approaches to weave Islam into the social fabric of South Africa as a more significant way of making the Muslims' presence conspicuous.

According to Michael Mumisa, a researcher and writer on African Islam, there has been an increase in the number of black South Africans converting to Islam particularly among the women and the youth. He believes that for some of the youth and women who were schooled in the politics of South African resistance and confrontation with the security forces of the former Apartheid state, the acceptance of Islam has become part of a radical rejection of a society based on Christian principles which are seen as having been responsible for establishing and promoting the Apartheid doctrine through the Dutch Reformed Church in South Africa. The influence of the radical ideas espoused by Malcolm X is very evident among South African Muslims of all races. Branches of the Nation of Islam are already established in South Africa. Louis Farrakhan paid a visit to South Africa and was received by President Nelson Mandela and African Muslim communities.

Another reason has been the presence of a growing Number of Sufi Orders and Groups. Amongst these is the Murabitun, a group that has a strong following in Spain.

== Organisations ==
Organisations such as the Jamiat ul-Ulama of the Transvaal (est. 1923), The Muslim Judicial Council (est. 1945), The Cape Town Ulama Board and Muslim Youth Movement of South Africa (est. 1970) enjoyed a fair amount of moral and financial support from the Muslim community for their social welfare activities. The once strong Muslim Students Association of South Africa (est. 1974), which had branches on many tertiary campuses, became less vocal and thus lost its grip on student activities; the MSA was thus replaced by Islamic societies that were either independent or affiliates of other Muslim organisations outside these institutions. There is also a Turkish school Nizamiye Muslim School which was established in 2011. There is also a community of the Chisti way of Tasawwuf.

Salmaan AlFaarsi was founded in 2020 with the vision of educating primarily the indigenous but not restricted to, about Islam and empowering them with financial literacy in order to stop them from being dependent on organizations. Their aim is not that of radicals and extremism but also not lax in upholding the pristine teachings of Islam.

There is emerging black Muslim movement in the township around Gauteng in particular. Gauteng Muslim Shurah Council (GMSC) this is as results of a lot of dissatisfaction with the above organisations who are predominantly Indian and coloured and are viewed as colonising the black thought into indopak version of Islam. The GMSC is now resourced in all Gauteng townships with regional shurah's with Amir's. Amir Mohammed Gadimang is the leader of this group. With prominent other regional Amir's Zaid Langa (Soweto) and Abdul Qadir Mandla Nkosi (Tshwane) who are the biggest regions.

=== Regulatory and Advisory Bodies ===
Besides political parties, a number of Islamic organisations operate in South Africa, looking after various aspects of Muslim life.

Major organisations include the Muslim Judicial Council, whose activities include the provision of Halaal certification of food. The Cape Town Ulama Board (CTUB), a progressive voice whose activities deal with Government dialogue and religious verdicts. The South African Hajj and Umrah Council (SAHUC) looks after the needs of South Africa's pilgrims and is responsible for the issuing of Hajj permits. There are many other local organisations that exist to look after the interests of the Muslim communities.

=== Relief Organisations ===
There are many Muslim relief organisations in South Africa serving both Muslim and Non-Muslim causes:

- Jamiatul Ulama Kwa Zulu Natal
- AWQAF SA
- Africa Muslims Agency / Direct Aid International
- Al Imdaad Foundation
- Gift of the Givers led by Imtiaz Sooliman
- Islamic Relief SA
- Islamic Dawah Movement of South Africa (IDM)
- Muslim Hands SA
- Muslim Refugees Association of South Africa
- Mustadafin Foundation
- CTIEC Ziyaee Welfare
- South African National Zak'ah Fund

Some of these organisations have their roots in South Africa, while others form part of a larger international organisation.

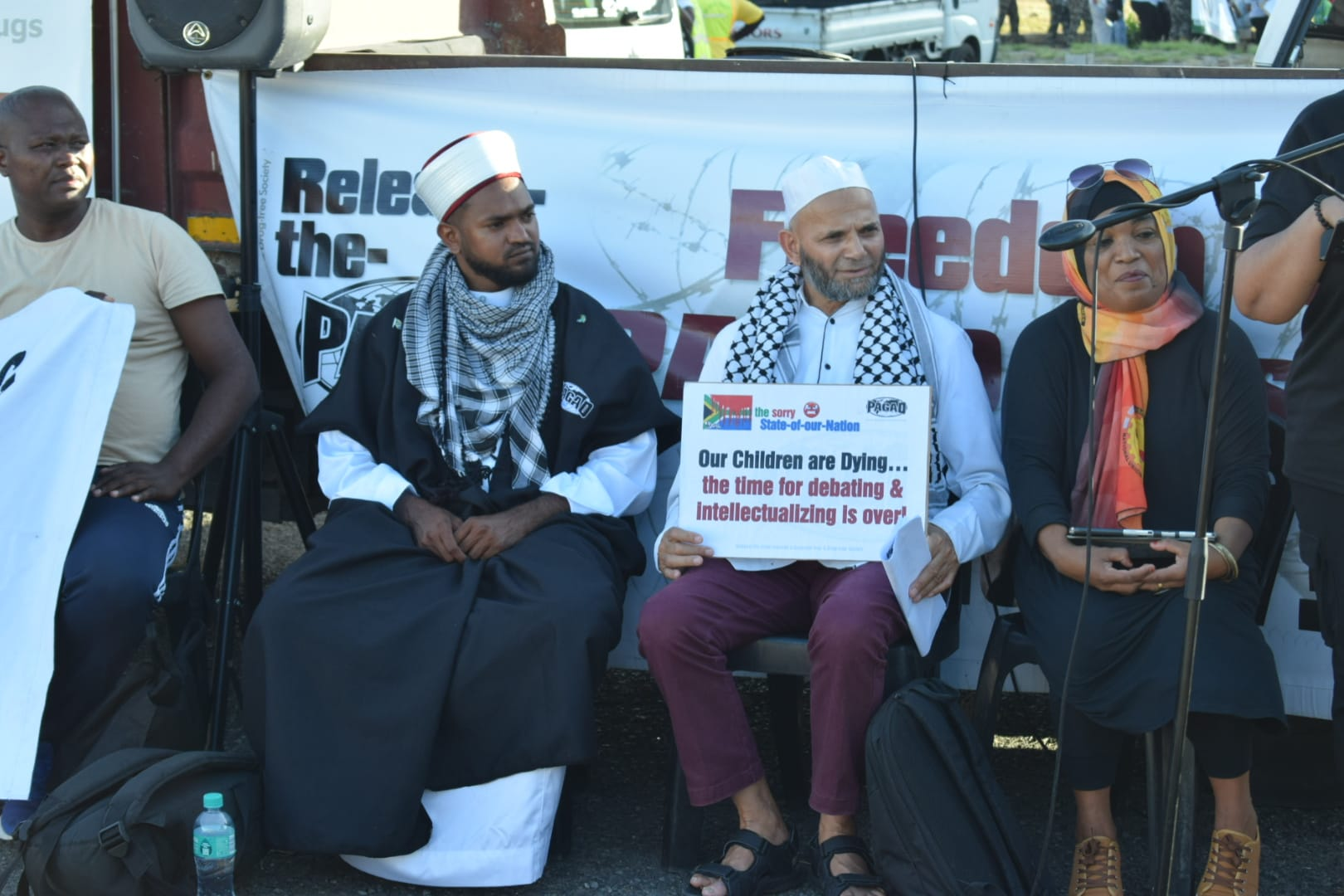
PAGAD Leader Abdus Salaam Ebrahim with Community Leaders at a Rally

=== Activism ===
Organisations such as PAGAD have received attention for their fight against gangsterism and drugs. PAGAD consisted of mainly Muslim people, but were joined by people from various religions. PAGAD, as the name suggests, was ostensibly formed to combat the rising trends of gangsterism and drug use. It became known more prominently, however, as proponents of urban terror. They were implicated in over 300 acts of violence, the majority of which involved explosives. PAGAD's operations largely ceased after the arrest and prosecution of its leaders in 2000.

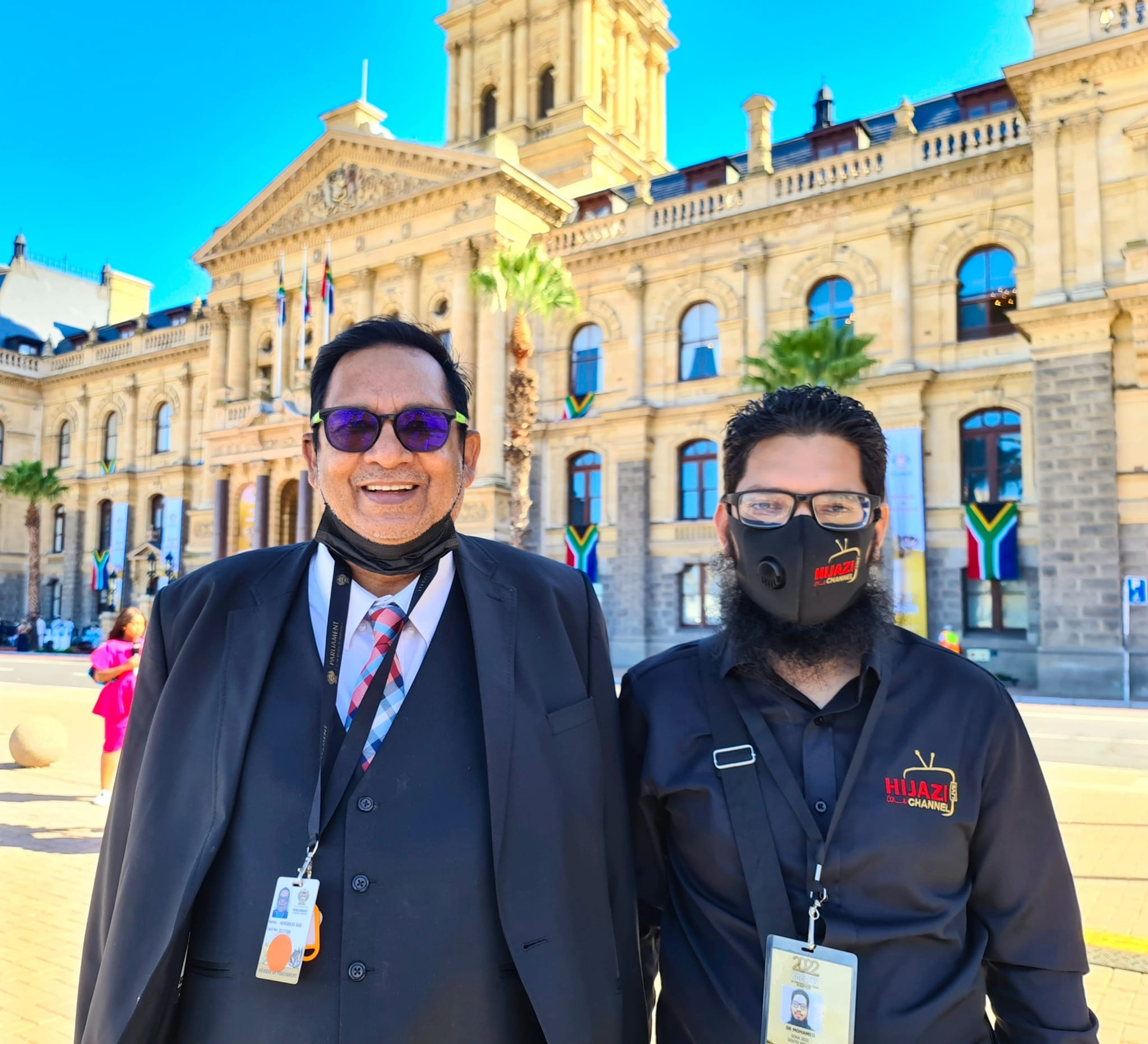
Al Jama-ah party leader Ganief Hendricks with CEO of Hijazi Channel Sayed Ridhwaan after conducting a short interview ahead of the SONA.

=== Islamic political parties ===
When the first democratic elections took place in April 1994 two Muslim parties emerged, the Africa Muslim Party and the Islamic Party. The AMP contested the National Assembly as well as the provincial legislature and the IP contested only the Western Cape provincial legislature. Neither party was able to secure seats in either legislature.

No Islamic party contested the 1999 elections.

The 2004 elections were contested by the AMP and the Peace and Justice Congress, again without success.

Al Jama-ah was formed in 2007, and won its first seat in 2019, becoming the first Islam-affiliated party to do so.

== Theology ==
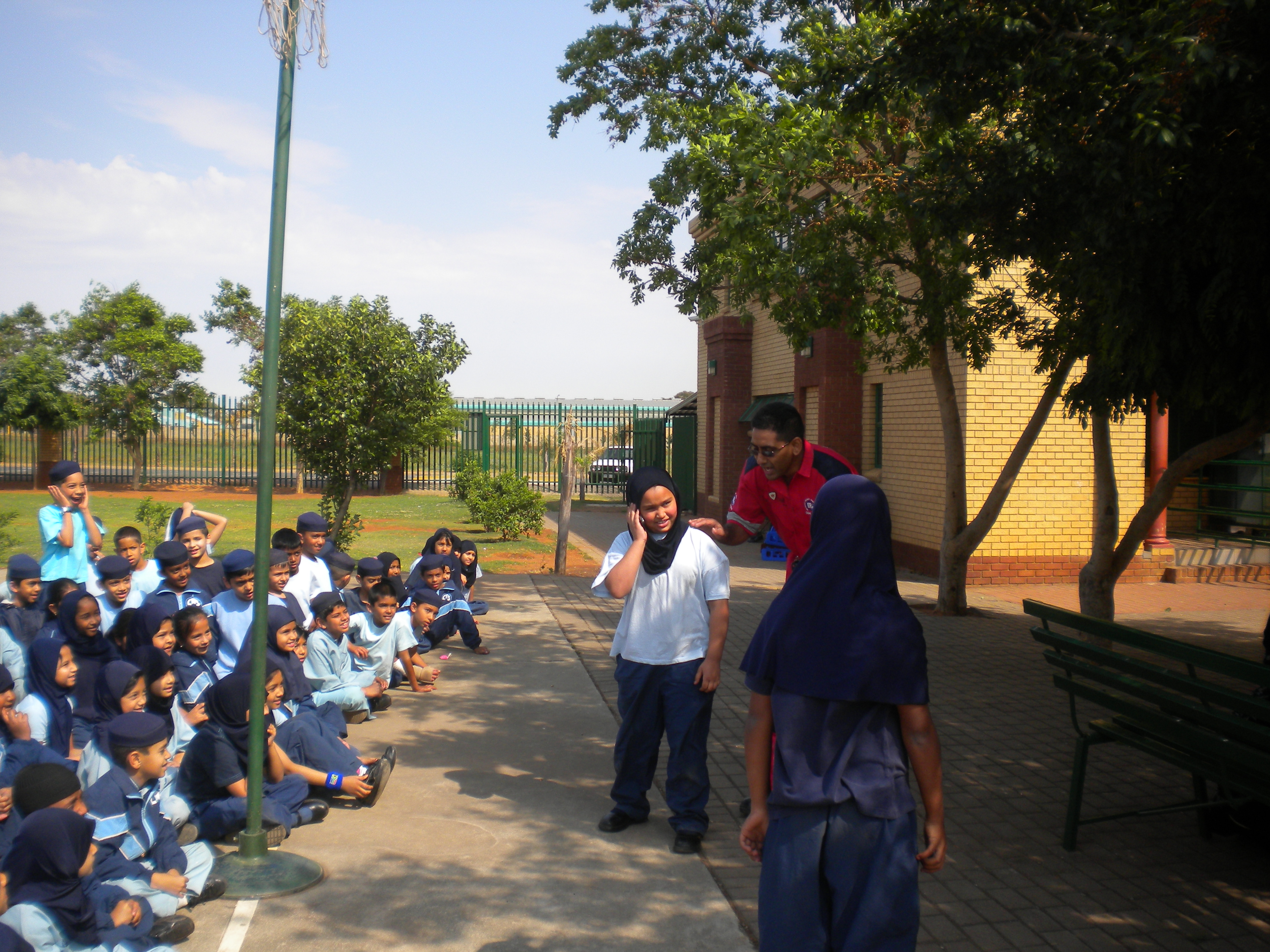
Lenasia Muslim School

Most South African Muslims are members of the Sunni branch of Islam; there are also large numbers of Shi'a and other smaller sects throughout South Africa.

=== Sects ===
Sunnis make up the majority of South African Muslims followed by Shia Muslims.

==== Madhab ====
Most of the Indian community follow the Hanafi Madhab, while the Malay, Kokni Indian & East African Communities usually follow the Sha'afi madhab, which predominates in the Western Cape. There is also an increasingly large number of adherents to the Maliki madhab, composed mostly of recent West African and Maghribi Migrants.

==== Scholarship ====
The Dominant traditions of scholarship are the rival South Asian Deobandi/Barelvi schools within the Indian Community.

The Malay Community has a much more varied tradition with graduates of Al-Azhar in Egypt, Umm-al Qurra in Mecca & other universities in Saudi Arabia & South Asia. Most of the Indian scholars are graduates from Deobandi affiliated Madrassahs or Sunni Zia Ul Ulooms Like Jamia Razvia Zia Ul Uloom (Rawalpindi – Pakistan).

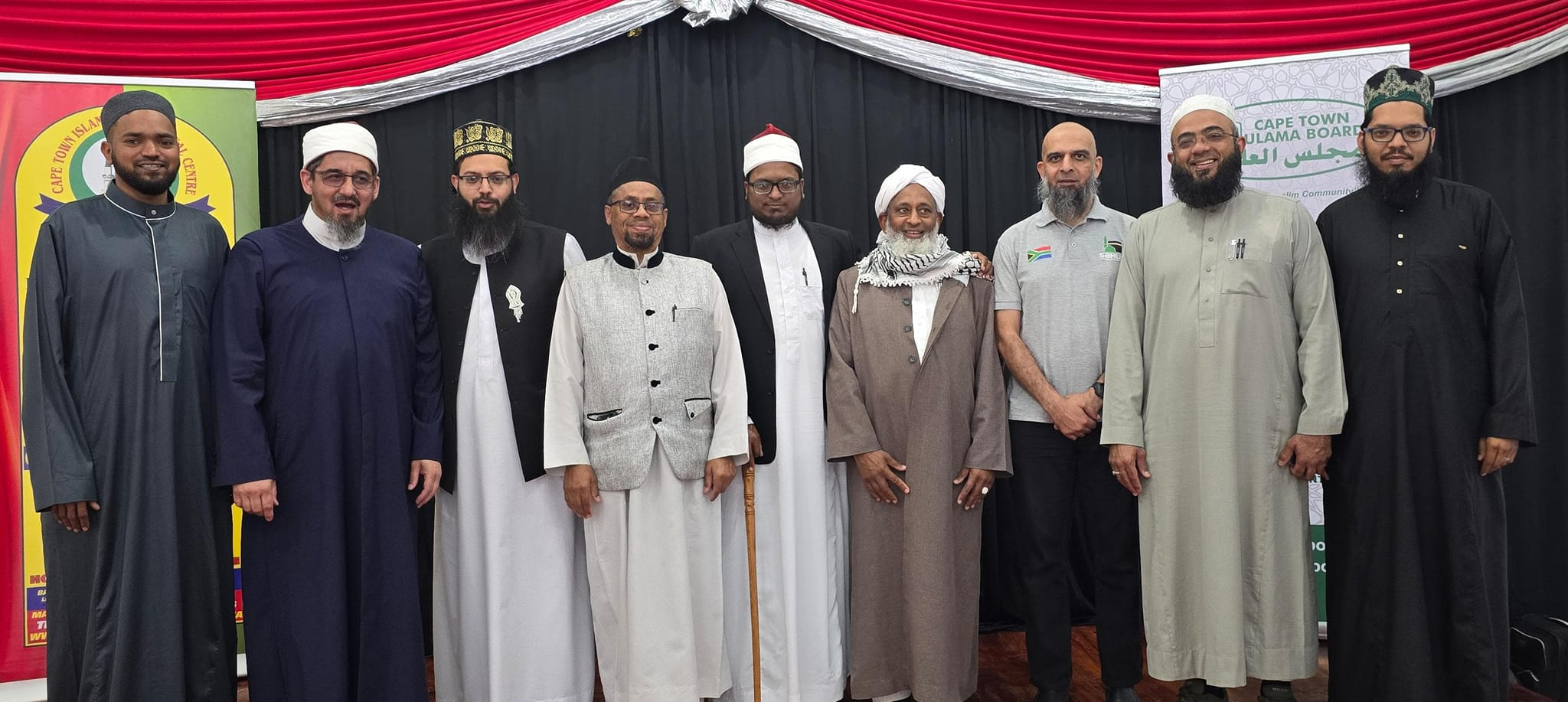
South African Ulama From UUCSA, Cape Town Ulama Board, Muslim Judicial Council & Darul Ihsan

=== Notable scholars ===
- Moulana Ebrahim Bham (Secretary General of Jamiatul Ulama South Africa)
- Mufti Mohammed Akbar Hazarvi (Principal of Darul Uloom Pretoria & Current Grand Mufti of South Africa)
- Sheikh Ebrahim Gabriels (Former President of the Muslim Judicial Council.)
- Mufti Ebrahim Desai (Founder of Darul Ifta Mahmudiyah)
- Ahmed Deedat (Founder Of IPCI)
- Mufti Sayed Haroon Al Azhari (Current Mufti Cape Town Ulama Board)
- Moulana Taha Karaan (Mufti of MJC & Dar al-Uloom al-Arabiyyah al-Islamiyyah, Strand-ra)
- Moulana Rafiek Jaffer (Discover Islam)
- Moulana Sayed Imraan Ziyaee (Deputy President of Sunni Ulama Council Cape)
- Moulana Allie Adam (Islamia Academy)
- Moulana Abdurragmaan Khan (Dar al-Turath al-Islami)
- Moulana Allie Goder (Darun Na'im)

== Community and interfaith relations ==
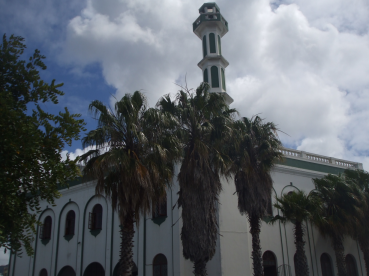
A Mosque in Wynberg, Cape Town.

This religious cohesion is most obvious in the Indian and Coloured residential areas where Muslims live amongst, work with and attend school with fellow South Africans of Hindu, Sikh, Buddhist, Christian, atheist and agnostic beliefs. South African Muslims generally do not segregate themselves from people of other faiths. As per the culture in South Africa, it is not uncommon for South African Muslims, just like their fellow non-Muslims, to shake hands, hug or even kiss (in the case of close friends and distant or close family) as a greeting – even with non-mahrams. The National Interfaith Leadership Council, which advised former President Zuma, included former Western Cape premiere, Erahim Rasool.

The Muslim community has been affected by a rise in drug abuse, particularly in Cape Town of the drug Tik (crystal meth). Crime and gangs are also visible in the poorer Muslim communities.

Qur'ans are available in libraries including the National Library. During the month of Ramadan, many Muslim retail stores, radio stations (public and private), publications and organisations send messages of goodwill to the local Muslim community. Many Muslim stores are closed on Eid-ul-Fitr.

Financial services providers such as First National Bank, ABSA bank, Standard Bank and Nedbank offer Sharia compliant financial solutions and banking products. South Africa also has several branches of Albaraka Bank (of Saudi Arabia), Habib Overseas Bank Ltd and HBZ Bank Ltd, which offers only Shari'a compliant banking. Oasis Crescent Management Group is also a financial service provider to Muslims in South Africa.Halal food products, butcheries, restaurants are widely available in South Africa although gender segregation is not common within South African society.

== Sharia law in South Africa ==
=== Marriage ===
South Africa is one of the few Muslim minority countries in the world which is considering the implementation of Muslim Personal Law or Muslim Family Law. In 2003, a draft Muslim Marriages Bill was submitted to the Department of Justice. This would allow courts to enforce the marital regulations of sharia law, with the assistance of a Muslim judge and assessors familiar with Islamic law, to protect the rights of Muslim women.

Proponents of the bill believe it would protect the rights of Muslim women as decisions made by legal scholars are not legally binding regarding financial settlements following a divorce.

Questions have been raised about the need for a separate marriage bill for Muslims, and there is lack of consensus in the Muslim community itself on the need for, and structure of the bill.

In May 2023, Al Jamah political party, under the leadership of Ganief Hendricks, made an attempt to have Muslim marriages officially recognized by presenting a private members' bill to the Minister of Home Affairs. The party received support from the Cape Town Ulama Board, who were present during the proceedings. As of now, discussions on this matter are ongoing.

In 2009, an unsuccessful application was brought before the Constitutional Court of South Africa by a Muslim women's organisation, to compel the government to enact the Muslim Marriages bill. During the hearing, Judge Kate O'Regan stated that, "the question is whether it is acceptable for the state to take over the management of a particular religion". Judge Albie Sachs commented that "it's asking the courts to intrude, in a very profound way, on a very sensitive issue".

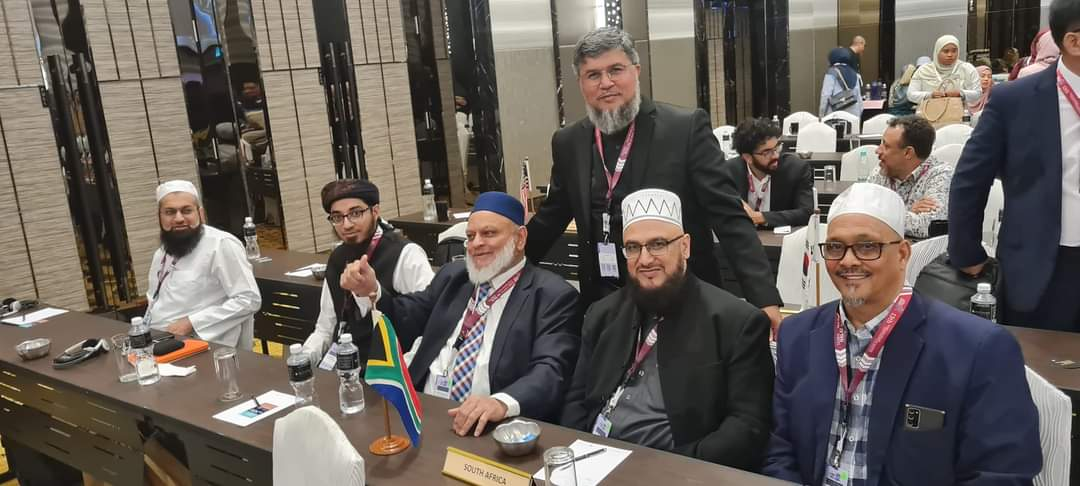
Representatives of Muslim Judicial Council Halaal Trust (MJCHT), National Independent Halaal Trust (NIHT), and South African National Halaal Authority (SANHA) at the Summit in Malaysia.

=== Halaal certification ===
There are a number of Halaal certification authorities, who certify food, retail edible items and restaurants as Halal. There is some disagreement between these organisations. The certifications carry considerable weight amongst South African Muslims.

The most prominent Halaal certification authorities in South Africa are:

- Muslim Judicial Council (MJC)
- South African National Halaal Authority (SANHA)
- National Independent Halaal Trust (NIHT)
- Islamic Council of South Africa (ICSA)

== Education ==
The majority of South African Muslims attend mixed gender public schools, while some attend private (mostly Catholic or Anglican) schools, where they are exempt from prayer sessions and Biblical curriculum. Islamic schools also exist under the control of the Association of Muslim Schools (AMS) as well as Madrasahs. The Islamic Schools under AMS offer a syllabus combining secular and Islamic studies. The secular syllabus is taken from the CAPS syllabus issued by the Department of Basic Education while the Islamic studies syllabus is taken from the Taalimi Board affiliated to the Jamiatul Ulama South Africa. Some institutions offer short courses on Islamic teaching, while Islamic Law and Islamic finance studies are also available.

Qu'ran Study groups are common and Arabic studies are available through private tutoring, or universities such as Wits University and University of the Western Cape.

South Africa has a number of Darul Ulooms around the country. These institutes have students from around the world, including a large number of African students. Some of these institutions include:

- Darul Uloom Pretoria
- Darul Uloom Azaadville
- CTIEC Zia ul Uloom
- Darul Uloom Qariyya Gharib Nawaaz, Ladysmith, South Africa
- Darul Uloom Newcastle, Newcastle, South Africa
- Darul Uloom Zakariyya
- Darul Taaleemuddeen

== Prominent Muslims in South Africa ==
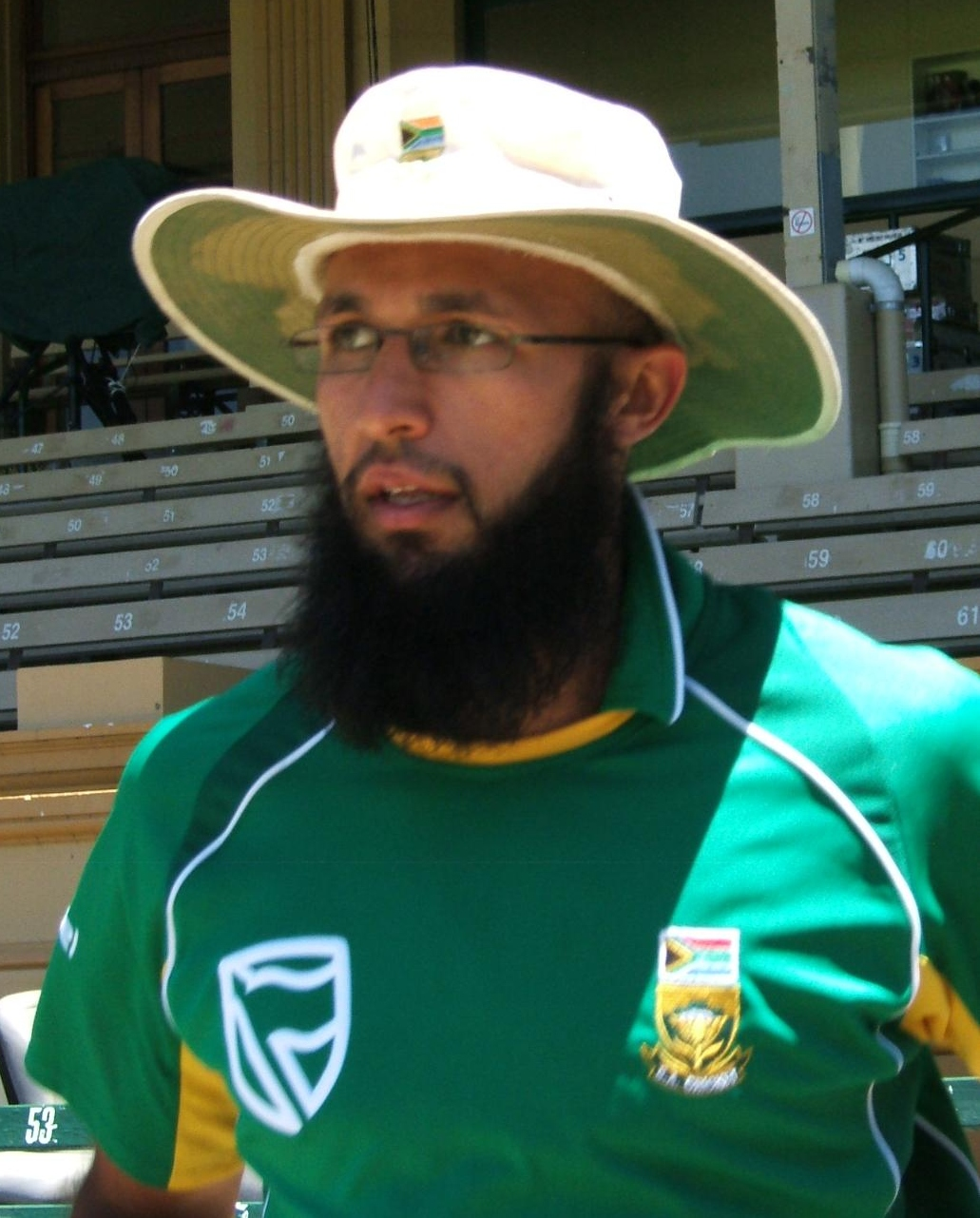
Hashim Amla, former Test captain of the South African cricket team

In addition to Cabinet ministers, there are a number of members of parliament as well as councillors in the various provinces. The former Western Cape premier and South Africa's Ambassador to the United States of America, Ebrahim Rasool, is Muslim. Imam Hassan Solomon (Raham) was a member of parliament from 1994 until his death in 2009. He joined the United Democratic Front, seen by many as a front for the banned African National Congress (ANC). During his years in exile in Saudi Arabia, Imam Solomon furthered his Islamic education. Imam Solomon returned to South Africa in 1992, and took up a seat in the National Assembly in Parliament following the first democratic elections in 1994. He served in Parliament until his death in 2009. Naledi Pandor is the former minister of International Relations and Cooperation, Pandor is the granddaughter of Z.K. Mathews an anti apartheid teacher and a prominent member of the ANC. Naledi converted to Islam after her marriage to Sharif Josef Pandor.

Sheikh Ahmed Badsha Peer was a highly respected Sufi. He arrived in South Africa in 1860 as an indentured labourer and was given an honourable discharge by the colonial British authorities when he was discovered to be mystic. His tomb is at the Badsha Peer Square/Brook Street Cemetery in Durban.

Abu Bakr Effendi was an Ottoman qadi of Kurdish descent who was sent in 1862 by the Ottoman sultan Abdulaziz at the request of the British Queen Victoria to the Cape of Good Hope, to teach and assist the Muslim community of the Cape Malays. During his stay at the Cape he produced one of the first works in Afrikaans literature with his work in Arabic Afrikaans, Uiteensetting van die godsdiens (Exposition of the Religion).

=== Sports ===
Cricket

- Hashim Amla became first non-White regular test captain of South Africa.
- Ahmed Amla, former batsman for the Dolphins and brother of Hashim Amla
- Wayne Parnell is a bowler in the South Africa national cricket team.
- Imraan Khan is a cricketer who plays domestic cricket and captains the Dolphins.
- Farhaan Behardien is a cricketer who plays ODIs and T20Is.
- Shabnim Ismail is a fast bowler for the South African national women's team and their leading all-time wicket taker in ODIs and T20Is.
- Imran Tahir is a leg-spinbowler who plays cricket for South Africa.
- Bjorn Fortuin is a spinner who plays cricket for South Africa
- Tabraiz Shamsi spinner and right arm batter for South Africa

Association football

- Moeneeb Josephs is a former goalkeeper for the South Africa national football team.
- Ashraf Hendricks is a former defender for Morako Swallows, Bidwest Wits, Black Aces and South Africa.
- Reyaad Pieterse, goalkeeper for SuperSport United and Kaizer Chiefs

Rugby union

- Nizaam Carr became the first Muslim to play for the Springboks

Martial arts

- Solly Said is a karateka based in Johannesburg and founder of his own karate system. A pioneer of South African karate, he has been practising since the mid sixties.
- Hoosain Narker is a karateka based in Cape Town and is an executive member of the All Styles governing body.

=== Politics ===
- Ahmed Kathrada, anti-apartheid activist and former MP
- Mandla Mandela is the chief of the Mvezo Traditional Council and grandson of Nelson Mandela.
- Ebrahim Patel serves as the Minister of Economic Development
- Naledi Pandor
- Enver Surty serves as the Deputy Minister of Basic Education
- Fatima Chohan former Deputy Minister of Home Affairs
- Ganief Hendricks, MP and leader of the Al Jama-ah

=== Religious ===
- Ahmed Deedat was a Muslim missionary.
- Ebrahim Desai, Muslim scholar and jurist
- Ebrahim Salehjee, Muslim scholar and jurist

== Media ==
=== Television ===
In South Africa there are three TV channels dedicated to the broadcast of Islamic content: Hilal TV, which is aired on paid satellite platform DSTV; Hijazi Channel, and INX Prime, All these channels broadcast a combination of local and international Islamic content. The once famous ITV on DSTV has shut its doors after lengthy court battles.

Every weekday public TV channel SABC 1 broadcasts short religious programmes before the Siswati/Ndebele news at 17h30. Each day a different religion is represented, with "Reflections on Faith" being the Islamic edition, broadcast on Fridays 17H00-17H02. An Nur-The Light is a Muslim religious programme that airs on SABC 1 on Sunday mornings and interfaith programme. Spirit Sundae features Muslim event coverage, personal profiles and discusses issues pertaining to the community. Religions of South Africa also broadcasts information about Islam. Islam Channel is also available on DSTV to South African Muslims as well as other Muslim programmes on the DSTV Indian Bouqet.

Regional community TV station Cape Town TV (CTV) has weekly broadcasts of pre-recorded Jumuah (Friday) prayer sessions. During the month of Ramadan, CTV also brings viewers lectures from the days of fasting, which broadcasts every night between 21H30-22H30.

=== Radio ===
Muslim stations in South Africa are limited to regional, or community based coverage. These include Radio 786 (Cape Town), Radio Islam (Johannesburg), The Voice of the Cape (Cape Town), Channel Islam International (Johannesburg) and Radio Al Ansaar (Durban)."IFM Radio 88.3Fm (Port Elizabeth).

=== Print Publications ===
Newspapers include Muslim Views, and Al Qalam Newspaper.

== Extremism ==
Generally, the local Muslim population are known to be peaceful, tolerant and moderate. However, the US state department listed two South African organisations that it claims were international terrorist organisations: People Against Gangsterism and Drugs (Pagad) and Qibla.

While Qibla and Pagad were active in violent activity in 2001, since then they have been involved in peaceful marches and protest actions, speaking out against war's in Iraq, Gaza, Darfur and other regions across the world.

Critics claim widespread corruption among police and officials, including the black market sale of South African passports, had undermined counter-terrorism efforts.

It was feared prior to the 2010 FIFA World Cup that extremists may have carried out attacks during the tournament and there were reports of Somali al-Qaeda, al-Shabab and militant run camps in neighbouring Mozambique. Despite this, no direct threats or attacks materialised.

The Muslim community in the country had organised a campaign to welcome guests into their country and homes, actively dispelling any perceived terrorism threats.

The campaign, labelled 'SA Muslims 2010', showcased Islam and Muslims in South Africa through various exhibitions, reflecting some of the community's 300-year history.

== Controversies ==
=== Muhammad cartoons ===
In May 2010, the local Mail & Guardian published a cartoon depicting the Islamic prophet Muhammad by Jonathan Shapiro (a.k.a. Zapiro) which sparked some uproar from the Muslim community. Death threats were made to Mr. Shapiro and the editor of the newspaper. An emergency court interdict was sought by The Council of Muslim Theologians (Jamiatul Ulama) to prevent the publishing of the cartoon, however the petition was denied by the presiding judge – who is herself a Muslim. The judge earlier chose not to recuse herself saying that her religious beliefs would not influence her. Zapiro created the cartoon in response to international outrage over the "Everybody Draw Muhammad Day" campaign of Facebook. Zapiro depicts Muhammad on a psychologist's couch moaning that, "other prophets have followers with a sense of humour!". The council stated that they feared violence in response and that the drawing may put the security of the 2010 FIFA World Cup at risk from extremists. It said that though it does not advocate violence, it would not be able to ensure that there would not be any. The editor of the paper said that, ""My view is no cartoon is as insulting to Islam as the assumption Muslims will react with violence," and said that the cartoon would not have been published if it was intended to be racist or Islamophobic. Zapiro stated that his cartoon was mild and not offensive and in no way similar to the Danish cartoon depicting Muhammad in a negative light. The following week, Zapiro published a cartoon of himself on a psychologists couch off-loading about the difficult week prior, and also saying, "The issue is depicting the prophet... it's that simple", and, "That's for adherents of Islam! Why should non-believers be censored? And there's the contradiction of all those ancient Iranian and Turkish Muhammad drawings... drawn by devout Muslims!". Further, "I'm sorry I'm being linked to that juvenile Islamophobic Facebook campaign. And I'm sorry if anyone's linked me to the Islamophobia of the U.S. 'war on terror'! ... Or the Burqa and minaret bans in Western Europe!", and that "making exceptions for religious censorship is hard for a cartoonist". An editorial piece opposite the cartoon stated that the paper "clearly underestimated the depth of anger ignited by the cartoon, and sincerely regret the sense of injury it caused many Muslims". Zapiro also noted the irony of being so harshly condemned by Muslims who often supported his pro-Palestinian drawing which angered his fellow Jews. Local clerics stated in a meeting with Zapiro that week that while they support freedom of expression, they do not support drawings of Muhammad. No violence or protests ensued after the cartoon was published and most local Muslims found it to be mild and some did not find it to be offensive and found the reaction of the council to have been exaggerated.

The Council of Muslim Theologians (Jamiatul Ulama) succeeded in 2006 in preventing the Sunday Times from publishing a controversial cartoon of Muhammad by a Danish cartoonist.

== See also ==
- Deobandi movement in South Africa
- Shia Islam in South Africa
- Nurul Islam Mosque, a Mosque in the Cape established in 1834.
- Nizamiye Masjid the biggest mosque in the Southern Hemisphere; situated in Midrand, Gauteng, completed in 2012.
- Kramats in South Africa
