= Deobandi movement in South Africa =

History of Deobandi movement

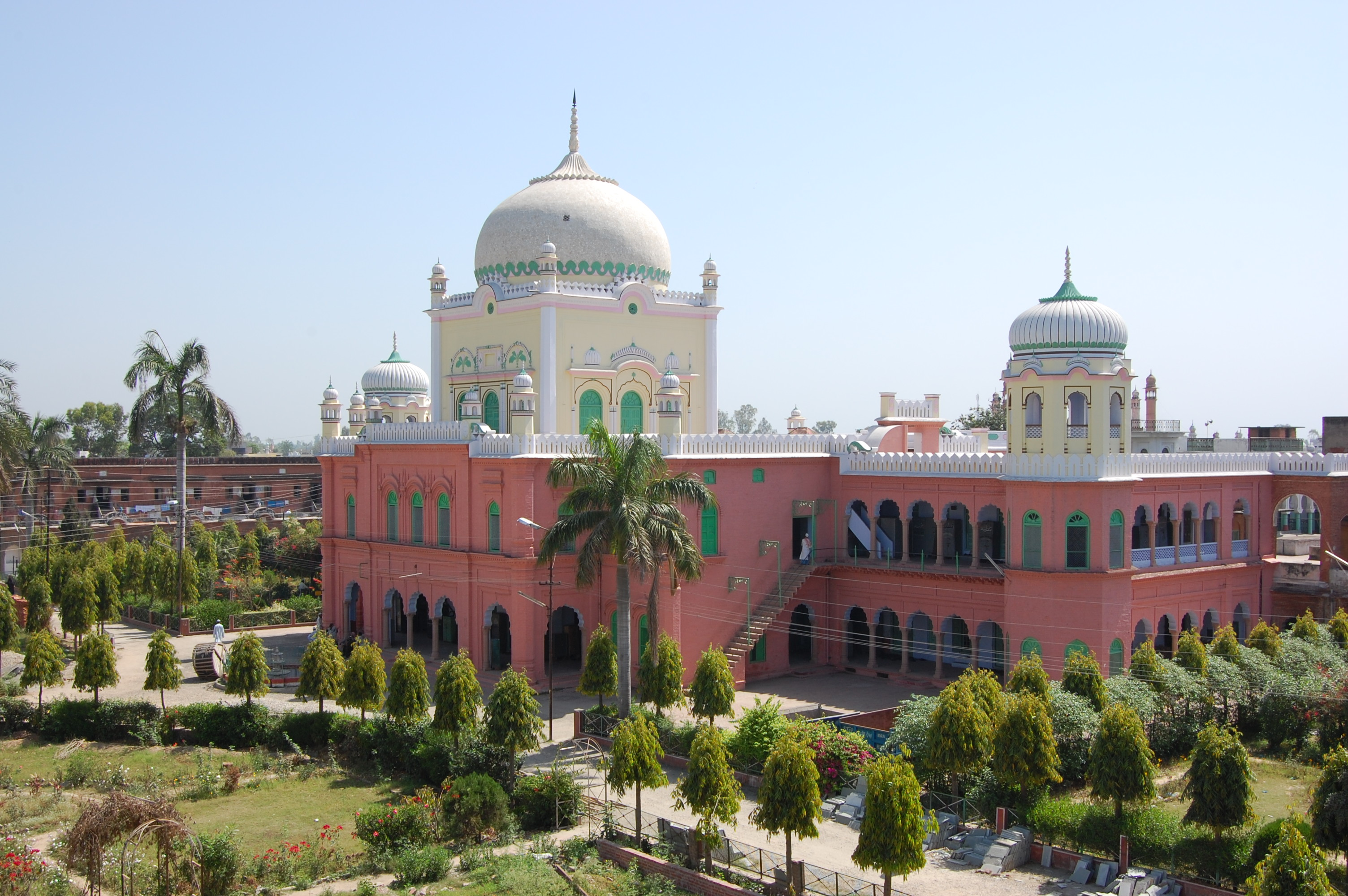
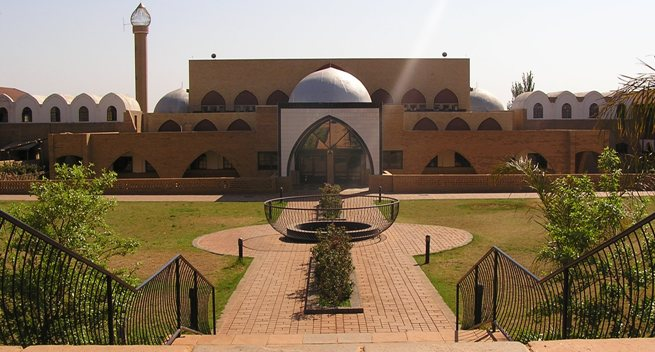
- Clockwise from top: Darul Uloom Deoband, Darul Uloom Zakariyya

Darul Uloom Deoband was established in 1866 in the Saharanpur district of Uttar Pradesh, India, as part of the anti-British movement. It gave rise to a traditional conservative Sunni movement known as the Deobandi movement. The Deobandi Movement has an international presence today, with its full-fledged manifestation in South Africa, a country where the movement was initiated through the Indian Gujarati merchant class. The Islamic education system of the Deobandi movement, as well as the necessary components of social and political organizations such as Tablighi Jamaat, Sufism and Jamiat, are fully functioning effectively in South Africa, as they do in India. Madrasas in South Africa provide Islamic higher education and are now centers for Islamic education for foreigners who are interested in receiving a Deobandi-style education. Many of their graduates, especially from Western countries such as the United Kingdom and the United States, are Western students. Some of South African madrasas are recognized globally, providing fatwa services. South Africa is now known for producing exceptional Islamic literature through translation and compilation. Similarly, the Tabligh Jamaat is a hub in South Africa that spreads throughout South and East Africa. Graduates of South African madrassas spend their time in the path of the Tabligh Jamaat. Through the work of several spiritual personalities of the Deobandis, the tradition of Deoband's Tasawwuf (Sufism) has taken root in South Africa. Among them are Zakariyya Kandhlawi, Masihullah Khan, Mahmood Hasan Gangohi and Asad Madani. South African Deobandi Muslims have many important and influential educational and socio-political organizations that educate the people and play an important role in religious and social activities. Among them are Jamiatul Ulama South Africa and the Muslim Judicial Council.

== Background ==
In the late 19th and early 20th century, due to the migration of Muslim businessmen from Gujarat to Africa, Deobandi ideology reached Africa. In the 19th century, some Muslim students from Surat and Bharuch districts of Gujarat were admitted to Darul Uloom Deoband, and among them were some notable religious scholars. The first among them was Ahmed Bujurg Surti, who was a resident of Shimla in Surat. In 1903, he graduated from Darul Uloom Deoband. He was ordained by Bay'ah to Rashid Ahmad Gangohi, one of the founders of Darul Uloom Deoband. One of his teachers was also Mahmud Hasan Deobandi. After completing his studies in Deoband, he returned to his birthplace and later traveled to South Africa. Ismail Bismillah was the second outstanding graduate of the Deoband who went to South Africa. Later, he went to Burma and then started teaching at the Jamia Islamia Talimuddin.

The first direct student of the Deoband from South Africa was Muhammad bin Musa Afrika. He was originally a resident of Simla, which is associated with Dabhel in the Surat district of Gujarat, but his family had moved to South Africa a few generations before and established residence in Johannesburg. He was a student of the hadith scholar Anwar Shah Kashmiri at Deoband. After completing his studies, he returned to Johannesburg where, alongside his extensive business ventures, he provided extensive religious services. He founded the Waterval Islamic Institute in Johannesburg for teaching Islamic and contemporary sciences. He built a building for it and bore all its expenses himself. He was responsible for providing free boarding facilities for students in accordance with the arrangements of Darul Uloom Deoband. He was the president of the Jamiat Ulama-e-Transvaal for many years. He was primarily indebted to the huge financial assistance for the construction and progress of Jamia Islamia Talimuddin. He was always interested in academic work. He founded a writer's organization in Dabhel called Majlis-e-Ilmi where the credit for publishing important books by Indian scholars was due. He died on 16 April 1963, in Johannesburg.

Ismail Ahmed Cachalia was the second prominent scholar of the Deoband in South Africa. Cachalia came from a powerful tradition of political activism. He completed his studies at Darul Uloom Deoband in 1930. Deoband played a role in shaping his politics because most of his teachers were members of the Indian National Congress or the Jamiat Ulema-e-Hind. He was a prominent political activist in South Africa and was a member of the Joint Passive Resistance Committee in 1946 and was arrested for leading a group of women resistors. The Government of India honored him with the Padma Shri in 1977.

One of the most popular personalities of Deoband was Hussain Ahmad Madani, who was the Sheikhul Hadith of Darul Uloom Deoband for a long time. At that time, some of his students were from South Africa who had come or later went to South Africa. Among them were Muhammad Yusuf Pandor, who runs a madrasa, and Bayejid Afriki, who is his Khalifa. Abdul Hakeem Umarji, a senior scholar from South Africa who was a student of Madani, served as the president of the Jamiatul Ulama KwaZulu-Natal. Among them, there were several more students who were registered as South Africans in Darul Uloom Deoband, they were:

- Muhammad Kasim Afriki (graduated in 1948)
- Nur Ali Afriki (1953)
- Muhammad Ismail Afriki (1954)
- Abdul Khalik Afriki (1955)
- Muhammad Yusuf Pandor (1956)
- Muhammad Kasim Bharat (1957)
- Muhammad Afriki (1957)

There are a sufficient number of students from South Africa at Darul Uloom, and by the end of the 20th century, about 250 had arrived. But when South African Muslims established their own large madrasas, they did not have to go to Deoband and could stay at those madrasas without difficulty.

In 1910, the Muslims of South Africa sent a large sum of money to Darul Uloom Deoband. Since then, their support has increased and there are a lot of sympathetic and supportive of Darul Uloom in various places in South Africa, such as Durban, KwaZulu-Natal, Transvaal, and KwaDukuza, and reached East Africa. Similarly, in 1920, Darul Uloom Deoband faced some financial difficulties in India, but this shortage was filled by valuable donations, especially from foreign countries, with South Africa playing a significant role in fulfilling this shortage. Due to the partition of India, a significant portion of the funding sources for Darul Uloom Deoband moved to Pakistan. Even during the economic crisis of 1951, the Muslims of South Africa continued to support Darul Uloom Deoband. Later, in 1971, a hostel named "Africi Manzil" was built for African students.

== Expansion ==
=== Qari Muhammad Tayyib ===
In 1963, Darul Uloom Deoband's rector Qari Muhammad Tayyib traveled to South Africa, which greatly helped strengthen the Deobandi ideology. About two thousand people from the four provinces of South Africa gathered at the airport in Johannesburg to welcome him. The mayor of Johannesburg and his wife were also present at a large police station. He stayed in Johannesburg for 15 days, then went to Durban and then to Cape Town. As a result of this journey, the misunderstandings about the Deobandi movement were dispelled and the identity of Darul Uloom Deoband became stronger. During this journey, he took a step so that the backward Muslim community could send their children to madrasas for religious education.

=== Other madrasas ===
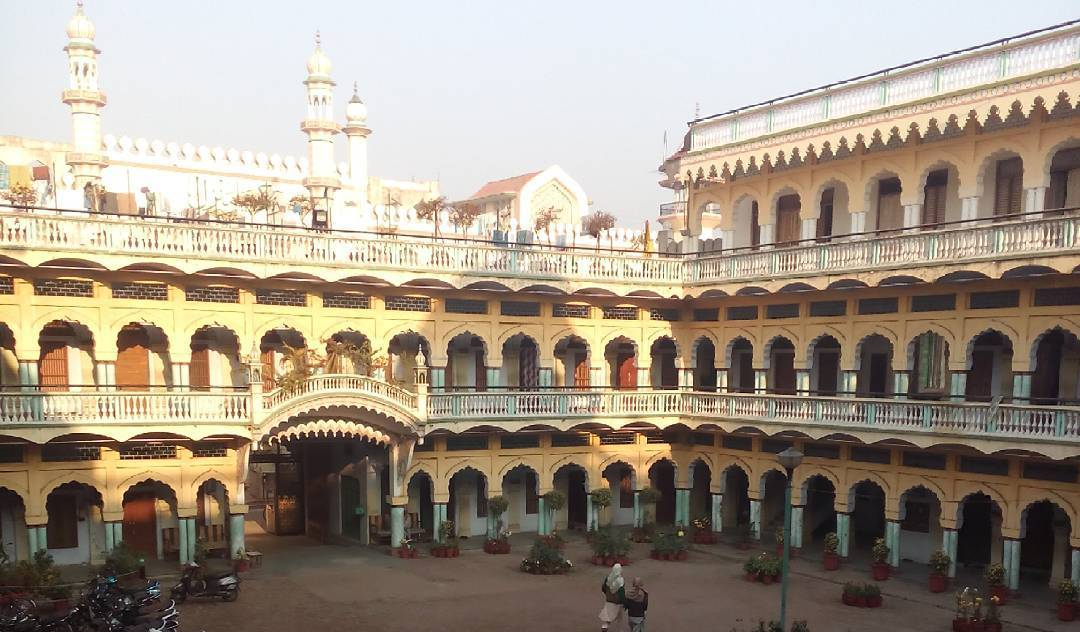
Mazahir Uloom

Alongside Darul Uloom Deoband, several other Deobandi madrasas in India have played a role similar to that of Darul Uloom Deoband, among which is Mazahir Uloom. The Sheikhul Hadith of Mazahir Uloom, Zakariyya Kandhlawi, and then Mahmood Hasan Gangohi had a great influence on South African students. Masihullah Khan, Khalifa of Ashraf Ali Thanwi and principle of the Masihul Uloom Madrasa, also attracted students from South Africa.

Jamia Islamia Talimuddin in Gujarat was a central madrasa that played a key role in creating the Indian Muslim community in South Africa. After Anwar Shah Kashmiri joined as the president of the madrasa, it reached new heights. Later, Aziz-ul-Rahman Usmani, Shabbir Ahmad Usmani, Yusuf Banuri, and Badre Alam Merathi joined the madrasa. Mirati later went to Medina. Mirati's numerous spiritual disciples spread throughout South Africa.

Similarly, other Madrasahs of Gujarat like: Jamia Hussainia Rander, Jamia Ashrafia Rander, Darul Uloom Matiwala, Darul Uloom Tarkesar, Darul Uloom Kantaria etc. play an important role.

=== Jamiatul Ulama Transvaal ===
In 1919, Indian scholars established the Jamiat Ulema-e-Hind, many of whom were students of Mahmud Hasan Deobandi. Similarly, in 1923, South African Muslims established the Jamiat Ulama Transvaal, later known as the Jamiatul Ulama South Africa, which played a role in education in addition to religious contributions. In 1955, the Jamiat Ulama KwaZulu-Natal was established in KwaZulu-Natal with the primary goal of education. Many scholars were associated with this organization. The Jamiatul Ulama Gauteng is another organization of the same kind established in 2006.

=== Tablighi Jamaat ===
Tablighi Jamaat is one of the main sources of influence of Deobandism in South Africa. Yusuf Kandhlawi, the second Amir of Tabligh, was interested in expanding Tabligh's activities in Africa. In 1956, under the leadership of Musa Surti, the first Tabligh Jamaat arrived in Kenya, Uganda, Tanzania, Malawi, Zambia, Mozambique, East Africa, Rhodesia, South Africa, Mauritius, Reunion, and other countries. After 1965, a trend of Tabligh Jamaat started in South Africa, and it became a center for the Tabligh Jamaat in South Africa. Countless Muslims join this movement and spread it in their countries.

=== Zakariyya Kandhlawi ===
There have been personalities who have influenced South African Indian Muslims, of whom the most notable is Zakariyya Kandhlawi. This renowned scholar was known as a Sheikhul Hadith and taught Hadith at Mazahir Uloom. He was one of the central figures of Tablighi Jamaat and was the author of more than a hundred religious texts. He was a spiritual guide who influenced many Muslims in South Africa to embrace Bay'ah or pledge of allegiance to him. Among them, he appointed several as his caliphs or deputies. They include: Yusuf Motala, Haji Ibrahim Mutala, Muhammad Suleman Pandor, Ahmad Mia, Ibrahim Abdur Rahman Mia, and Muhammad Gardi.

=== Masihullah Khan ===
Masihullah Khan was a prominent Deobandi scholar and spiritual figure in India. He was the Khalifa of Ashraf Ali Thanwi. Under Thanwi's guidance, he came to Jalalabad in the Uttar Pradesh region of India and established a madrasa called Miftahul Uloom, which later became a large madrasa. Many students from South Africa studied at this madrasa and received Bay'ah from him. He appointed five people in South Africa as Khalifa or successor.

=== Mahmood Hasan Gangohi ===
Mahmood Hasan Gangohi was a Grand Mufti and Hadith teacher of Darul Uloom Deoband and Mazahir Uloom. As a spiritual personality, he was a senior Khalifa of Zakariyya Kandhlawi. Like Kandhlawi, he also influenced South African Muslims at the grassroots level. He authored many religious texts, including 32 volumes of Fatawa Mahmoodiyah. He had numerous South African and Gujarati students in Darul Uloom Deoband and Mazahir Uloom. Thousands of South African Muslims received Bay'ah from him, and he designated 30 of them as Khalifas or successors. They spread his extensive influence in their own regions, and some became famous in South Africa, India, Pakistan, and Bangladesh, including Ebrahim Desai.

=== Asad Madani ===
Hussain Ahmed Madani's elder son, Asad Madani, who was the president of Jamiat Ulema-e-Hind, had a significant influence among the Muslims in South Africa. He had many disciples in South Africa, many of whom he appointed as his successors.

== Education ==
The South African Deobandi Darul Ulooms offer a 6 or 7-year course. They have introduced a 1-year bridging course or preparatory course, which is aimed at students who have no prior knowledge of the recitation of the Quran in Arabic, Urdu and other essentials. From the second year, the students are introduced into Islamic Jurisprudence (fiqh) of the Hanafi school beginning with a book entitled Nur al-Idah by Al-Shurunbulali (d. 1658) until the sixth year culminating in the teaching of al-Hidayah by Burhan al-Din al-Marghinani (d. 1782). Also in the second year, some Hadith and the translation of the meanings of the Quran from Arabic into English are taught along with Arabic grammar, etymology, syntax and literature. Most of these are taught through the Urdu medium. Some basic Persian and some texts on the rules regarding the correct recitation of the Quran (tajwid) are also taught. The third year is a continuation of the subjects in the second year with the introduction of some exegesis of the Quran (tafsir) and the biography of Muhammad. Subjects, such as tafsir, Arabic literature, syntax and tajwid, continue in the fourth year, with the addition of the laws of Islamic Inheritance and the Principles of Islamic Jurisprudence, which is based on the book Usul ash-Shashi, which is difficult for a beginner. In the fifth year, tajwid and tafsir continue along with the Principles of Islamic Jurisprudence with focus on a text known as Nur al-Anwar by Mulla Jiyun (d. 1715). The new subjects are rhetoric, Islamic theology (aqidah), the Principles of tafsir and some of the rules on the modes of recitation of the Quran. In the sixth year, the students study a work on tafsir known as al-Jalalayn, a Hadith work known as al-Mishkat, and they are introduced into the principles and terminology of Hadith. The final year is dedicated to a study of the six canonical books of Hadith, al-Muwatta and Sharh Ma’ani al-Athar.

In comparison, the curriculum at Darul Uloom Deoband is similar with a few additional subjects because of the lengthier duration of the course. A comparison of the Darul Ulooms mentioned above reveals that the overall structure of the curriculum and the subjects are the same. The two South African institutions have less content in some subjects because of the 6-year course. The primary focus is on teaching the Hanafi School with an emphasis on Al-Hidayah, which deals with debates within a specific fiqh school. The different commentaries written on Al-Hidayah kept the scholars engaged and also ensured that the respective schools extrapolation of laws to new situations would always be of the highest quality. Al-Hidayah covers sections on worship, marriage, divorce, finance, business and inheritance. It provides few guidelines on government and judicial matters, which is understandable because governments and the style of governing change.

== Scholars ==
Prominent Deobandi scholars from South Africa:

Ismail Ahmed Cachalia (d. 2003)	He was a political activist and a leader of Transvaal Indian Congress and the African National Congress. He was one of the leaders of the Indian Passive Resistance Campaign of 1946 and the Defiance Campaign in 1952. The Government of India awarded the fourth highest Indian civilian honour of Padma Shri in 1977.
Cassim Sema (d. 2007)	He was the founder of Darul Uloom Newcastle, first madrasa in South Africa and possibly the first madrasa that uses English as its medium of instruction.
Ebrahim Desai (d. 2021)	He was a jurist who established the Darul Iftaa Mahmudiyyah, the Askimam and served as the senior professor of hadith at Madrasah In'aamiyyah and ranked among The 500 Most Influential Muslims.
Yusuf Karaan (d. 2015)	He was the head Mufti of the Muslim Judicial Council and was known for his knowledge of Islamic jurisprudence and his contributions to the development of Islamic finance.
Taha Karaan (d. 2021)	Son of Yusuf Karaan, he served as head-mufti of Muslim Judicial Council and founder of Mahajjah Research Institute and the Dar al-Uloom al-Arabiyyah al-Islamiyyah in Strand.

== Institutions ==
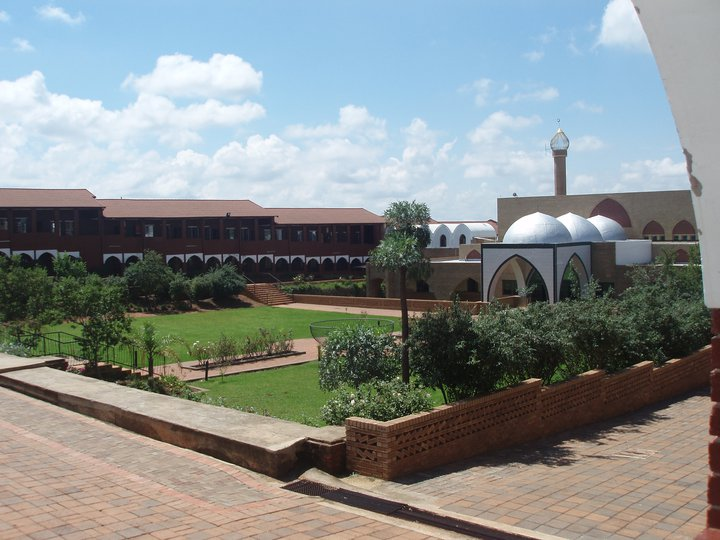
Darul Uloom Zakariyya

Some notable Deobandi institutions in South Africa:

Waterval Islamic Institute (Mia's Farm)	In July 1940, Muhammad bin Musa Ismail Mia, a student of Darul Uloom Deoband, established it in Halfway House. It was one of the first Islamic boarding institutes and has had a significant impact on South African Muslims through numerous Islamic publications. It was subsequently run by Ibrahim Mia and Ahmad Mia.
Darul Uloom Newcastle	It was the first formal institution of higher Islamic studies in South Africa, as well as the first Deobandi madrasa in South Africa, located in Newcastle, KwaZulu-Natal. It was founded by Cassim Sema in 1973. It is called the mother of all Darul Ulooms in South Africa. Although only Hanafi fiqh is taught in such institutions in the Indian subcontinent, it also offers both Hanafi and Shafi'i fiqh.
Darul Uloom Azaadville	A student started Alim classes with one teacher in Germiston in 1972. This grew into Madrasah Arabia Islamia, Darul Ulum Azaadville in 1981, with eight full-time Alim students and four graduates, as well as approximately twenty Hafizul Quran graduates.
Darul Uloom Zakariyya	Located in Lenasia with an international student population. Opened in 1983 in an agricultural area, it is now surrounded by the suburb of Zakariyya Park, which is named in its honor. The institute has gained widespread reputation due to the exemplary altruistic and spiritual philanthropy exercised by its alumni.
Madrasah Mu'einul Islam	Madrasah Mu'einul Islam, a school for Muslim girls, was established in Zakariyya Park, Gauteng, in 1985 under the guidance of Mahmood Hasan Gangohi. It began with a few students and teachers in a house in Lenasia, and then moved to its own premises in Zakariyya Park.
Madrasah Taleemuddeen	It was established by Mufti Ebrahim Salejee in Isipingo.
Qaasimul Uloom	An Islamic College in Cape Town initiated in 1986 by Ismail Allie.
Jameah Mahmoodiyah Springs	Jameah Mahmoodiyah, founded in 1992 by Ismail Rahim, is an institution in Springs, that offers Hifz ul Qur'ān, 'Ālim, and Iftā' courses to more than 120 students. It was named after the grand Mufti of India, Mahmood Hasan Gangohi.
Madrasah In'aamiyyah	The institute was founded in 1994 by Mahmood Madni Desai, following the instruction of his father Ahmad Moosa Desai. It started with one teacher and one student.
Dar al-Ulum al-Arabiyyah al-Islamiyyah	The madrasah was founded in 1996 in Croydon, Faure and offered an ālim program and hifẓ classes to some 30 students. In 2001, the madrasah relocated to Firlands, Gordon's Bay, and currently has parallel hifẓ and ‘ālim programs with students from various countries.
Darul Uloom Nu’maniyyah	Since 2001, Darul Uloom Nu’maniyyah has been providing spiritual, personal, and character building programs to underprivileged youth, particularly from low-income communities with severe social conditions around Chatsworth. The institute has expanded its reach beyond its original aim, accepting students from across South Africa and other African countries.
Jamiah Arabiah Islamiah	The establishment of a Darul Uloom in Stanger was a dream inspired by the visit of Zakariyya Kandhlawi in 1981, and was eventually realized in 2009 under the patronage of Ismail Desai, with the aim of providing authentic Islamic education in an Islamic environment for all ages and people.

== Organizations ==
Some notable Deobandi organizations in South Africa:

Jamiatul Ulama South Africa	This is an old Islamic organization in South Africa. In 1923, the organization was established under the name of Jamiatul Ulama Transvaal with the aim of fulfilling the religious needs of Muslims. It is the first Deobandi organization in South Africa.
Muslim Judicial Council	Most influential Muslim religious organization in the Western Cape. Muslim Judicial Council (MJC) is a Muslim Judiciary that provides religious guidance, education, Fatwa, Dawah, Halaal certification, and social development, particularly in marriage counseling. It is a non-profit organization and adheres to the Ahlus Sunnah wal Jamah belief code.
Lenasia Muslim Association	The Lenasia Muslim Association provides Islamic education to people of all ages in South Africa. It was founded in the 1960s to address the lack of Islamic knowledge and education, which was previously only accessible through imported books in Urdu. The organization aimed to develop English-based syllabus, establish madrasahs, and provide teacher training. With this approach, the LMA became a leader in Islamic education in South Africa.
Majlisul Ulama South Africa	Majlisul Ulama South Africa is a body of qualified Islamic scholars with Muftis in its ranks, providing researched Islamic education and Fatawa based on the principles of the Sharia. They publish numerous books, articles, and answer questions, with some available on their website, and distribute a monthly newspaper containing the latest information and answers to questions.

== See also ==
- Index of Deobandi movement–related articles
