= Muhammad Saeed Navlakhi =

South African Islamic scholar and halaal authority

- Born: Durban, South Africa
- Citizenship: South African
- Education: Islamic Theological Sciences (Karachi, Pakistan)
- Occupations: Islamic scholar, Theological Director
- Organization: South African National Halaal Authority (SANHA)
- Known for: Standardisation of global halaal protocols
- Title: Moulana

Muhammad Saeed Navlakhi (commonly known as Moulana Navlakhi) is a South African Islamic scholar and the Theological Director of the South African National Halaal Authority (SANHA). He is a prominent figure in the global halaal industry, serving as an executive member of the World Halal Council and a key architect of South Africa's national halaal certification standards.

== Education and early career ==
Navlakhi completed his advanced Islamic studies in Karachi, Pakistan, where he specialised in Islamic jurisprudence (Fiqh). Upon returning to South Africa, he became involved in the theological oversight of food production, particularly during the transition of the South African meat industry from state control to deregulation in the mid-1990s.

== Career at SANHA ==
In 1996, Navlakhi was a founding member of the South African National Halaal Authority (SANHA), an organisation established to create a unified, non-profit regulatory body for halaal auditing in South Africa. As Theological Director, he is responsible for the religious compliance of over 1,400 certified plants and establishments, including multinational food and pharmaceutical producers.

Navlakhi played a pivotal role in the Orion Cold Storage legal case in 2011, where he served as a lead technical witness and advocate for consumer rights following the discovery of mislabelled meat products. The case resulted in a high-court interdict and led to significant reforms in South African halaal food security protocols.

== International roles ==
Navlakhi is a recognised authority on the "harmonisation" of halaal standards—the effort to align different national religious standards to facilitate international trade.

- World Halal Council (WHC): He serves on the executive board of the WHC, representing the African continent in global policy discussions.
- Global Advocacy: He has been a keynote speaker at the World Halal Summit (Istanbul) and the Malaysia International Halal Showcase (MIHAS), where he has lectured on the integration of modern food science with classical Islamic dietary laws.

== See also ==
- South African National Halaal Authority
- Halal
- Islam in South Africa
