= Ulama (disambiguation) =

Ulama may refer to:

== In Islam ==
- Ulema, also transliterated "ulama", a community of legal scholars of Islam and its laws (sharia). See:
  - Nahdlatul Ulama (Indonesia)
  - Darul-uloom Nadwatul Ulama (Lucknow)
  - Jamiatul Ulama Transvaal
  - Jamiat ul-Ulama (disambiguation)

== Other ==
- Ulama (game), a modern variety of the Mesoamerican ballgame
- Spot-bellied eagle owl, "ulama" in Sinhalese, a large bird of prey
- Devil Bird, a cryptid in Sri Lankan folklore
