= Askimam =

Islamic website

Askimam.org
- Askimam logo on 21 August 2021

- Screenshot of Askimam's Belief Category on 16 July 2021
- Website type: Islamic, Hanafi, Legal/Religious
- Country of origin: South Africa
- Creator: Ebrahim Desai
- Website: askimam.org
- Commercial: No
- Registration: Required
- Launched: 2000; 26 years ago: ask-imam.com in 2000; askimam.org in 2004
- Current status: Active

Askimam is a website providing information regarding Islam. It was founded by South African Islamic scholar and jurist Ebrahim Desai in 2000. The answers on this website are reflections of the juristic views of the Hanafi Deobandi school of thought. It has been called more influential, wide-ranging and comprehensive than the web resources of Al-Azhar University and its sympathisers put together.

== History ==
The website was started by South African Islamic scholar and jurist Ebrahim Desai, who formerly headed the Darul Ifta of Madrasah In'aamiyyah. It is thought to be technically-updated mirror of another site, ask-imam.com, which started in 2000. Askimam.org was launched in 2004. It aims to help people who use the World Wide Web to access common Islamic questions and answers. The website had about 4686 religious edicts in August 2002.

A survey was conducted about the structure of the fatawa (religious edicts) on Askimam in 2011. It was seen that despite Ebrahim Desai's students belonging to various geographical locations, they prepared a plethora of edicts, and Desai was the final authority. He was the master teacher and each fatwa had a closing line, 'checked and approved by Mufti Ebrahim Desai'. According to scholar G. R. Bunt, Askimam reflects the views of Muslims living as a minority in non-Muslim societies. Questions come from a variety of religious perspectives and several new fatwas are posted every day. The questions on the site demonstrate several challenges faced by Muslims in the contemporary era. Bunt described the site as more comprehensive, influential and wide-ranging than the web resources of al-Azhar and its sympathisers put together. The site's founder died on 15 July 2021 in Durban.

== Approach ==
Askimam website reflects the outlook of the Deobandi Hanafi school of thought. The answers provided do not always provide substantial textual analysis and justifications but are concise. The difference between ijtihad and fatwas is acknowledged. The scholars and jurists associated with the website differentiate between the opinions of different Islamic schools of thought. The site provides answers only to Fiqh- (Jurisprudence) related questions in light of the Hanafi school. It also suggests that people following other Sunni schools of thought ask their appropriate scholars.

== See also ==
- Darulifta-Deoband.com
