= Jamiat ul-Ulama =

Jamiat ul-Ulama meaning Council of Theologians in Arabic could refer to:

- Jamiatul Ulama Transvaal, a Muslim organization that operates in the Transvaal region of South Africa.
- Jamiatul Ulama KwaZulu-Natal, a Muslim organization that operates in KwaZulu-Natal Province, South Africa. Founded in Durban by senior Muslim Theologian
- Jamiat Ulema-i-Islam, a Pakistani political party
- Jamiat Ulema-e-Pakistan, a Pakistani political party
