= Cassim Sema =

South African Muslim scholar

Ml Cassim Mohammed Sema

Personal life
- Born: 1920 Newcastle, Natal Province, Union of South Africa
- Died: 2007 (aged 86–87) Newcastle, KwaZulu-Natal, South Africa

Religious life
- Religion: Islam
- Denomination: Sunni

Ml Cassim Mohammed Sema (12 May 1920 – 9 June 2007) was a South African Sunni Muslim scholar who established the first madrasa in South Africa and possibly the first madrasa that uses English as its medium of instruction. He was the founder of Darul Uloom Newcastle.

== Biography ==
Ml Cassim Mohammed Sema was born on 12 May 1920 in Newcastle. He graduated from the Jamia Islamia Talimuddin in the traditional dars-e-nizami in October 1942. His teachers include Yousuf Banuri.

Sema taught in Wasbank 23 years and returned to Newcastle in 1968 as the head of the Newcastle Muslim Community. During his career at Wasbank, he formulated a "madrasa syllabus" which was chosen by the Jamī’at al-Ulama Natal in 1967 as a single Madrasah syllabus for the Province.

Sema was trying to establish an Islamic institution with boarding facilities in South Africa, and succeeded in starting the first madrasa using the English medium "madrasa", the Darul Uloom in Newcastle on 13 May 1973. The madrasa is said to be the first Deobandi madrasa in South Africa.

Ml Sema died on 9 June 2007 and Mufti Faiyazur Rahim whom Ml Sema appointed as the Bukhari teacher lead the Janaaza Salah. His funeral was attended by 4000 people.

== See also ==
- Deobandi movement in South Africa
- List of Deobandis
