= Darulifta-Deoband.com =

Islamic website

- Screenshot of homepage on 3 February 2022
- Website type: Islamic, Hanafi, Legal/Religious
- Country of origin: India
- Website: darulifta-deoband.com/en
- Commercial: No
- Registration: Required
- Launched: 2007; 19 years ago
- Current status: Active

Darulifta-Deoband.com is a bilingual (Urdu and English) fatwa website maintained by the Online Fatwa Department of Darul Uloom Deoband. As of 2016, it is the world's largest bilingual fatwa website. About 15,000 fatwas are sought in Darul Uloom Deoband every year, of which 6 to 7 thousand are online. In January 2022, India's National Commission for Protection of Child Rights recommended the government to shut down the website, citing its content as violating the country's laws.

== History ==
Darul Uloom Deoband started their institutional website journey in 2002 after the arrival of internet facility to towns and cities of India. After the launch of the website and email communication, Darul Uloom Deoband's fatwa department or Darul Ifta started answering questions from the world over the internet. Thus, due to the increase in online queries and other requirements, Darul Uloom Deoband established Online Fatwa Department in 2005 and a bilingual (Urdu and English) website named Darulifta-Deoband.com was launched in 2007. As of December 2016, the website has about thirty thousand selected fatwas in Urdu and English sections, making it the world's largest bilingual fatwa website. As of January 2022, the website has 9,181 fatwas in the English section and 32,812 fatwas in the Urdu section. The number of respondent muftis is 9, Habibur Rahman Khairabadi is the Chief.

== Criticism ==
Considering a complaint under 13 (1) (j) of the Protection of Child Rights Act, The National Commission for Protection of Child Rights (NCPCR) said that the explanations and answers given on Darul Uloom Deoband's fatwa portal were not in accordance with the laws and regulations of the country. Such comments violate children's rights and harm them with free access to the Internet, the commission claimed. They have recommended to the Government of Uttar Pradesh to ban access to the website until such content is removed.

The Students Islamic Organisation of India referred to this as "another attempt to undermine the madrassa". Abul Qasim Nomani, VC of Darul Uloom Deoband said in response to the complaint that "those who seek fatwas in the light of the Sharia are only answered in the light of the Sharia. There is no obligation here."

It was banned in India on 7 February 2022.

== See also ==
- Askimam
