= Darul Uloom Newcastle =

- Type: Darul uloom
- Established: 13 May 1973; 53 years ago
- Founders: Cassim Sema
- Religious affiliation: Islam
- Principal: Ismail Ebrahim Akoo
- Location: Newcastle, South Africa
- Campus: Urban
- Website: darululoomnewcastle.co.za

Darul Uloom Newcastle is a college for Higher Islamic Education (Deobandi madrasa), located in Newcastle, KwaZulu-Natal, South Africa. It was the first formal institution of higher Islamic studies in South Africa, as well as the first Deobandi madrasa in South Africa. It was founded by Cassim Sema in 1973. It is called the mother of all Darul Ulooms in South Africa. Although only Hanafi fiqh is taught in such institutions in the Indian subcontinent, it also offers Hanafi, Shafi'i fiqh and Maaliki Fiqh.

== History ==
On 13 May 1973, Darul Uloom Newcastle officially started with only 9 students. Official classes begin on 9 September. The site where the madrasa is located was once a Roman Catholic convent. It was vacant for over 15 years. The site was acquired after 3 years of negotiations with the competent authorities. For the first three years, Cassim Sema alone took the classes of the students and his wife cooked meals for them. As the medium of education is English, many foreign students also come to study here.

It has been closely associated with the Tablighi Jamaat since its inception. It was the first Deobandi madrasa in South Africa to include Shafi'i fiqh in its curriculum, as it admitted non-Hanafi students from the beginning. At present, the principal of the madrasa is Ismail Ebrahim Akoo and the Chairman of the trustees is Ayob Mohamed Kachwee.

== See also ==
- Deobandi movement in South Africa
- List of Deobandi madrasas
