= Ebrahim Desai =

South African Muslim scholar and jurist (1963–2021)

Mufti Ebrahim Desai

Personal life
- Born: 16 January 1963 Richmond, Natal, South Africa
- Died: 15 July 2021 (aged 58) Durban, South Africa
- Main interest: Fiqh
- Notable works: Commentary on Qaseedah Burdah; Introduction to Hadīth; Introduction to Islamic Commerce
- Education: Jamiah Islamiah Talimuddin Dabhel
- Known for: Askimam

Religious life
- Religion: Islam
- Denomination: Sunni
- Founder of: Darul Iftaa Mahmudiyyah
- Jurisprudence: Hanafi
- Movement: Deobandi

Muslim leader
- Disciple of: Mahmood Hasan Gangohi

Ebrahim Desai (16 January 1963 – 15 July 2021) was a South African Muslim scholar and jurist who established the Darul Iftaa Mahmudiyyah, the Askimam fatawa portal and served as the senior professor of hadith at Madrasah In'aamiyyah. He was an alumnus of Jamiah Islamiah Talimuddin Dabhel and ranked among The 500 Most Influential Muslims. He authored books including Commentary on Qaseedah Burdah, Introduction to Hadīth and Introduction to Islamic Commerce.

== Biography ==
Ebrahim Desai was born on 16 January 1963, in Richmond, Natal. He memorized the Quran at the Waterval Islamic Institute and studied traditional Dars-i Nizami course at the Jamia Islamia Talimuddin in Gujarat, India. He specialized in Islamic jurisprudence under Ahmed Khanpuri. He also studied with the former Grand Mufti of Darul Uloom Deoband, Mahmood Hasan Gangohi, the author of the multi-volume Fatawa Mahmudiyyah and became his authorized disciple in Sufism.

Desai taught at the Madrasah Ta῾līmuddīn, in Isipingo Beach for ten years, and headed the Fatwa department of the Jamiatul Ulama Kwazulu Natal. He served as the senior professor of hadith at the Madrasah In'aamiyyah for another ten years, and headed its Darul Ifta. In March 2008, he travelled to Hong Kong to lecture students at the Islamic Kasim Tuet Memorial College. In 2011, he shifted to Durban and established the Darul Iftaa Mahmudiyyah in Sherwood. He taught Sahih Bukhari at Darul Uloom Nu'maniyyah and headed the Darul Iftaa Mahmudiyyah, that he established in Sherwood. In 2000, he started the Ask Imam Fatawa Portal, an online Islamic questions and answers database, which is thought to have given him an international prominence. According to V. Šisler, "Ebrahim Desai exemplifies a scholar who, although being trained in non-Azhari institution outside of the Arab world, gained global recognition mainly through mass support accumulated via information and communication technology."

Desai served as the chairman of FNB Islamic Finance's Shari’ah Board. He started the Sharī῾ah Compliant Business Campaign in 2002 to provide "a conference to tackle contemporary business matters in Islamic Commerce and Finance", according to the website of Darul Iftaa Mahmudiyyah. He was featured among The 500 Most Influential Muslims compiled by the Royal Islamic Strategic Studies Centre. Namira Nahouza referred to him as the "South African Grand Mufti of Indian descent." His students include Abrar Mirza, Faisal al-Mahmudi and Husain Kadodia. Farhana in her research study indicates that "Desai himself was arguably a master teacher to the students of Darul Ifta Mahmudiyyah, the institution where he taught and from where all his fatwas were generated. A survey of the structure of the fatwas on askimam.org in 2011 revealed that while Desai's students hail from different geographical locations, they generate the bulk of fatwas, and as master teacher he was the final authority, as indicated by the closing line at the end of each fatwa: 'checked and approved by Mufti Ebrahim Desai'."

Desai died on 15 July 2021, in Durban. Abdur Rahman ibn Yusuf Mangera, Muhammad ibn Adam Al-Kawthari, Omar Suleiman and Yasir Nadeem al Wajidi expressed grief over his death.

== Literary works ==
Desai's religious edicts have been published as Contemporary Fatawa in four volumes. His other works include:

- Al-Mahmood (Collection of his religious edicts)
- Imam Bukhari and his famous Al-Jāmi Al-Sahīh
- Introduction to Hadīth
- Introduction to Islamic Commerce
- Commentary on Qaseedah Burdah

== See also ==
- Deobandi movement in South Africa
- List of Deobandis
