= Nizamiye Mosque =

Mosque in Midrand, South Africa

Nizamiye Masjid
- Arabic: مسجد النظامية

- Location of the mosque in Greater Johannesburg

Religion
- Affiliation: Sunni Islam
- Ecclesiastical or organizational status: Mosque
- Status: Active

Location
- Location: Midrand, Johannesburg, Gauteng
- Country: South Africa
- Interactive map of Nizamiye Masjid
- Coordinates: 26°0′51″S 28°7′45″E

Architecture
- Type: Mosque
- Style: Classical and contemporary; Islamic; Ottoman
- Groundbreaking: 2009
- Completed: 2012

Specifications
- Capacity: 6,000 worshippers (Prayer halls); 550 people (Conference hall)
- Height (max): 32 m (105 ft)
- Dome: 26
- Dome dia. (inner): 24 m (79 ft)
- Minaret: 4
- Minaret height: 55 metres (180 ft)
- Site area: 10 ha (25 acres)

Website
- nizamiyecomplex.co.za

The Nizamiye Masjid (Arabic: مسجد النظامية), (Turkish: Nizamiye Camii) often called the Nizamiye Mosque, is a Sunni mosque, located in the city of Midrand, in Greater Johannesburg, in the province of Gauteng, South Africa.

It is often stated to be the largest mosque in the Southern Hemisphere, occupying less than two-thirds of a hectare in a 10 ha (25-acre) site. The plans for the mosque were originally designed in Turkey, but a South African architect adapted the design to South African building standards. Construction began in October 2009 and was completed in 2012.

== Origin ==
Ali Katırcıoğlu, a Turkish businessman, planned to build Ottoman-styled architecture in places where it was absent. Failing to acquire a suitable location in the United States, the project was moved to South Africa. This move was advised by Fethullah Gulen.

Work began on the project on 1 October 2009, and it was officially inaugurated by the South African President Jacob Zuma on 4 October 2012. The name of the mosque was inspired by the 11th-century Nizamiyyas, higher education institutions founded by Nizam al-Mulk in the Seljuk Empire.

== Complex ==
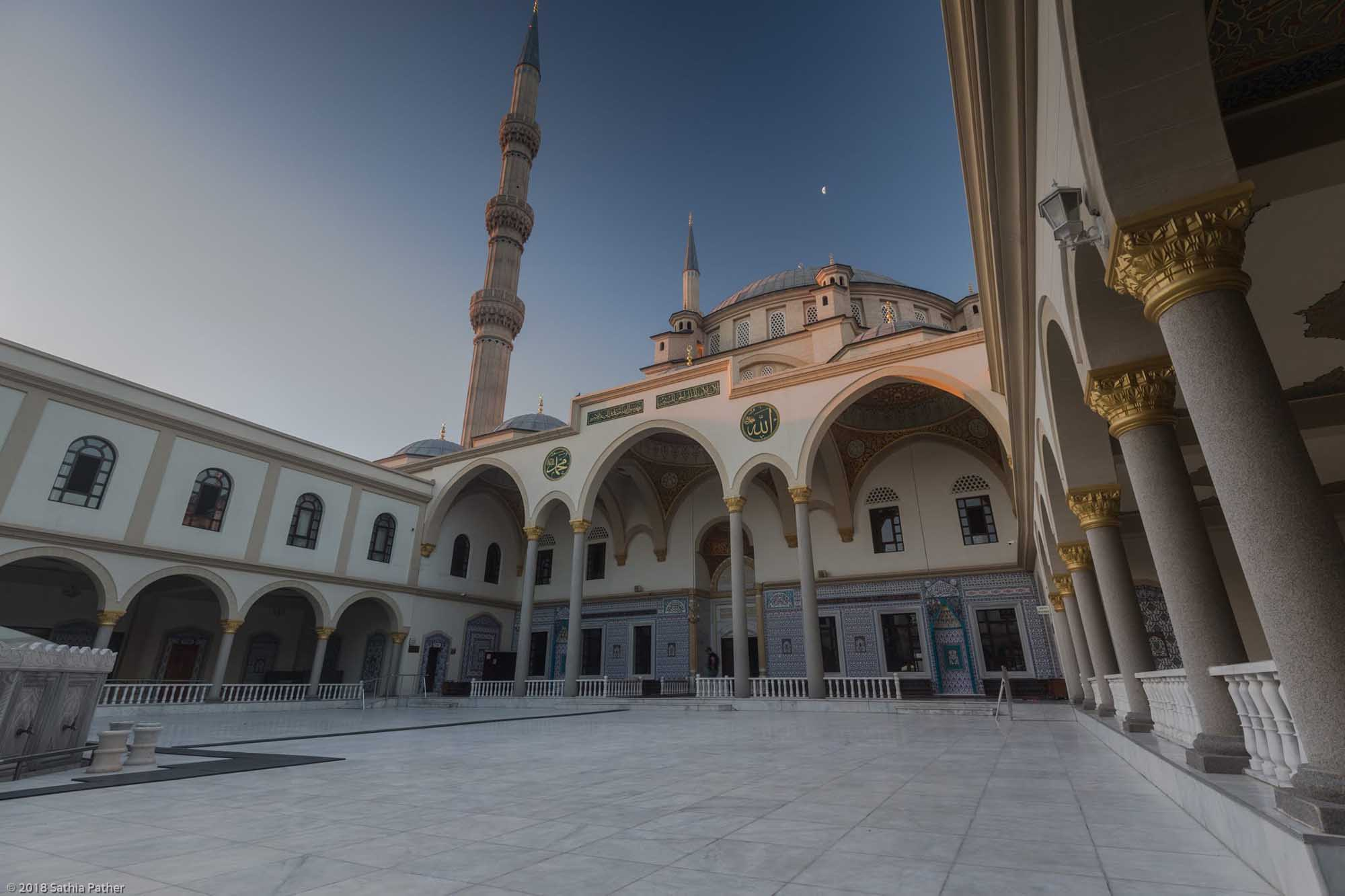
The mosque façade

The Nizamiye Complex (Turkish: Nizamiye Külliyesi) has several institutions besides the mosque and serves as a community centre with its several halls and facilities.

=== The mosque ===
Construction on the mosque began in October 2009 and was completed in 2012. The basic plan of the mosque was adopted from the 16th-century Ottoman Selimiye Mosque. This mosque, located in Edirne, Turkey, was designed by Mimar Sinan. Nizamiye Masjid was scaled to the Selimiye Mosque by a ratio of 80%. The plans for the mosque were designed in Turkey and adapted by a South African architect to South African building standards.

The mosque has a main dome that is 31 metres (102 ft) high and 24 metres (79 ft) wide that is covered in 49 t (48 long tons) of lead. There are an additional four half domes and 21 smaller domes. Inside the mosque are authentic Turkish ceramics on the walls and calligraphy on the ceiling. The dome is patterned with Turkish art and the custom-made carpet below is a reflection of it. There are four minarets that are 55 metres (180 ft) high, which have stairs that go up to three platforms. There are 232 stained glass windows.

Up to 6,000 people can be accommodated per service within the facilities of the central prayer hall for men and the prayer gallery for women. There are five wudhu facilities in one of the courtyards. On special occasions, the mosque is lit up in luminescent green and purple at night.

=== Schools ===
Nizamiye School was opened in January 2012 and can accommodate up to 850 pupils. The school's curriculum offers Islamic studies which are incorporated in the South African secular education syllabus. The classes are given in English but Arabic and Turkish are also taught. The school is open to the general public, but advises that scholars observe Islam due to its curriculum. A renowned educator, Isakh Turan, has been appointed as the school's principal. The school has boarding facilities for around 300 boys.

=== Clinic ===
Nizamiye Clinic offers health care services in 10 different areas for those without the need for an overnight stay. It is open to the general public. Ali Katircioglu, financier of the Nizamiye complex, added the clinic to the property on the request of Nelson Mandela.

=== Market ===
The bazaar section of the complex has 11 shops, whose revenue is used in part for expenses of the mosque.

=== College ===
Nizamiye College (Turkish: Nizamiye Medresesi) will be a home of Islamic higher education. Currently, the facilities are under construction.

=== Cemetery ===
Nizamiye Cemetery is a private cemetery governed by the complex foundation. It is situated at a corner of the mosque, which can be viewed from inside. The remains of Mehmet Remzi Efendi (a decorated Ottoman Turkish diplomat appointed to the Ottoman Embassy in South Africa in April 1914 and died under British arrest in 1916) was moved to the cemetery and became the first person to be buried there.

== Gallery ==
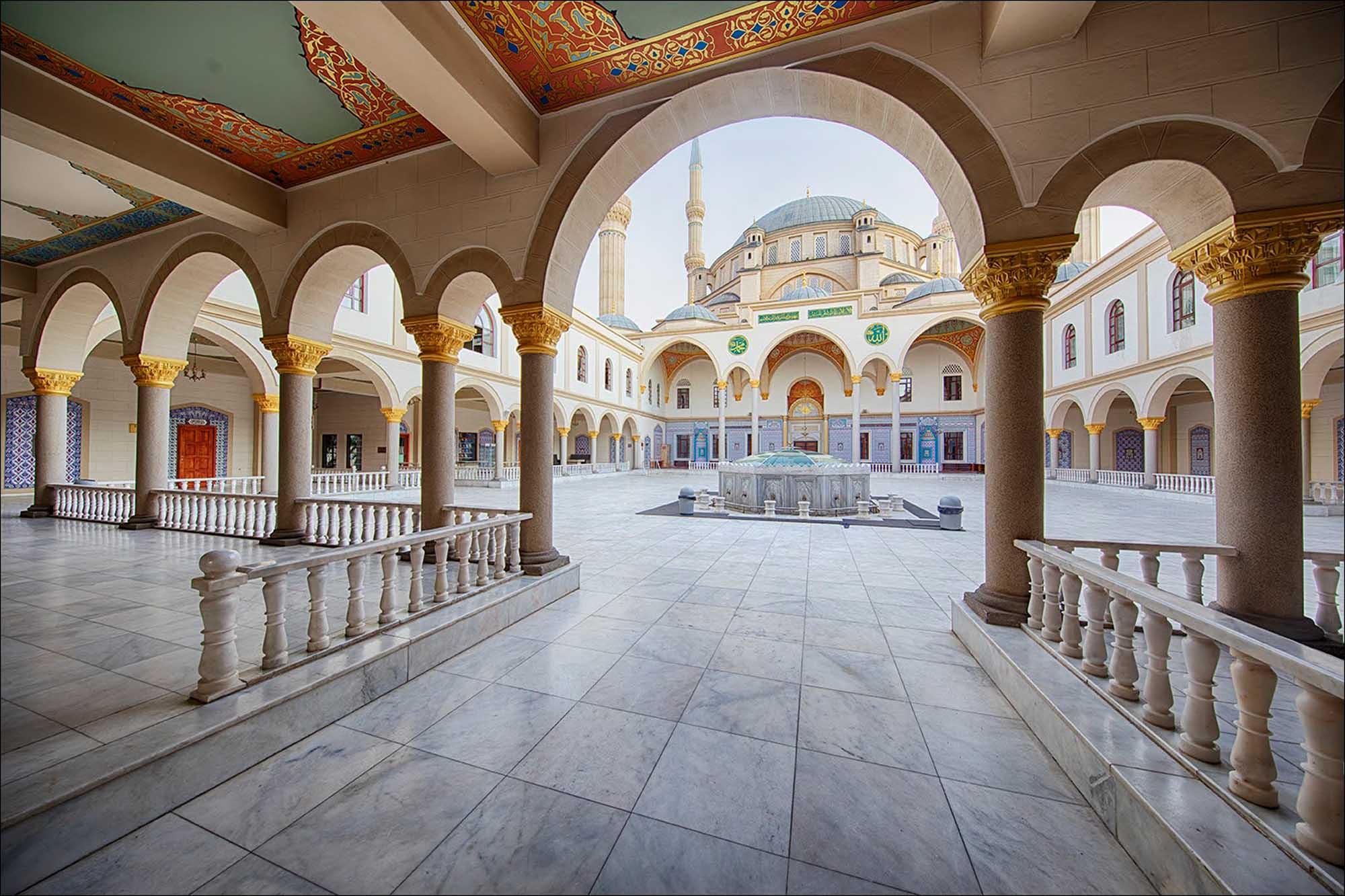
The mosque architecture

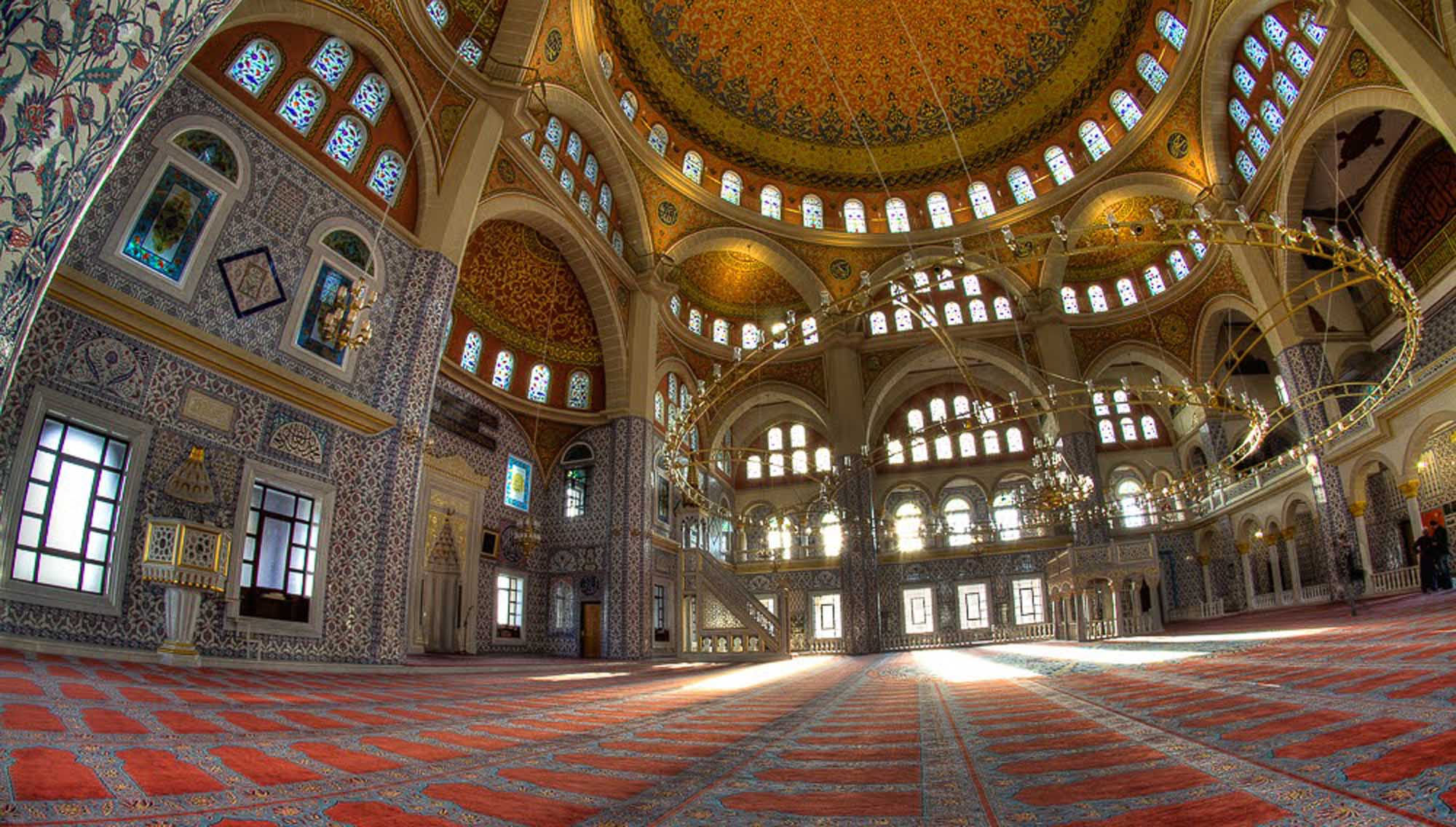
The mosque interior

The mosque interior

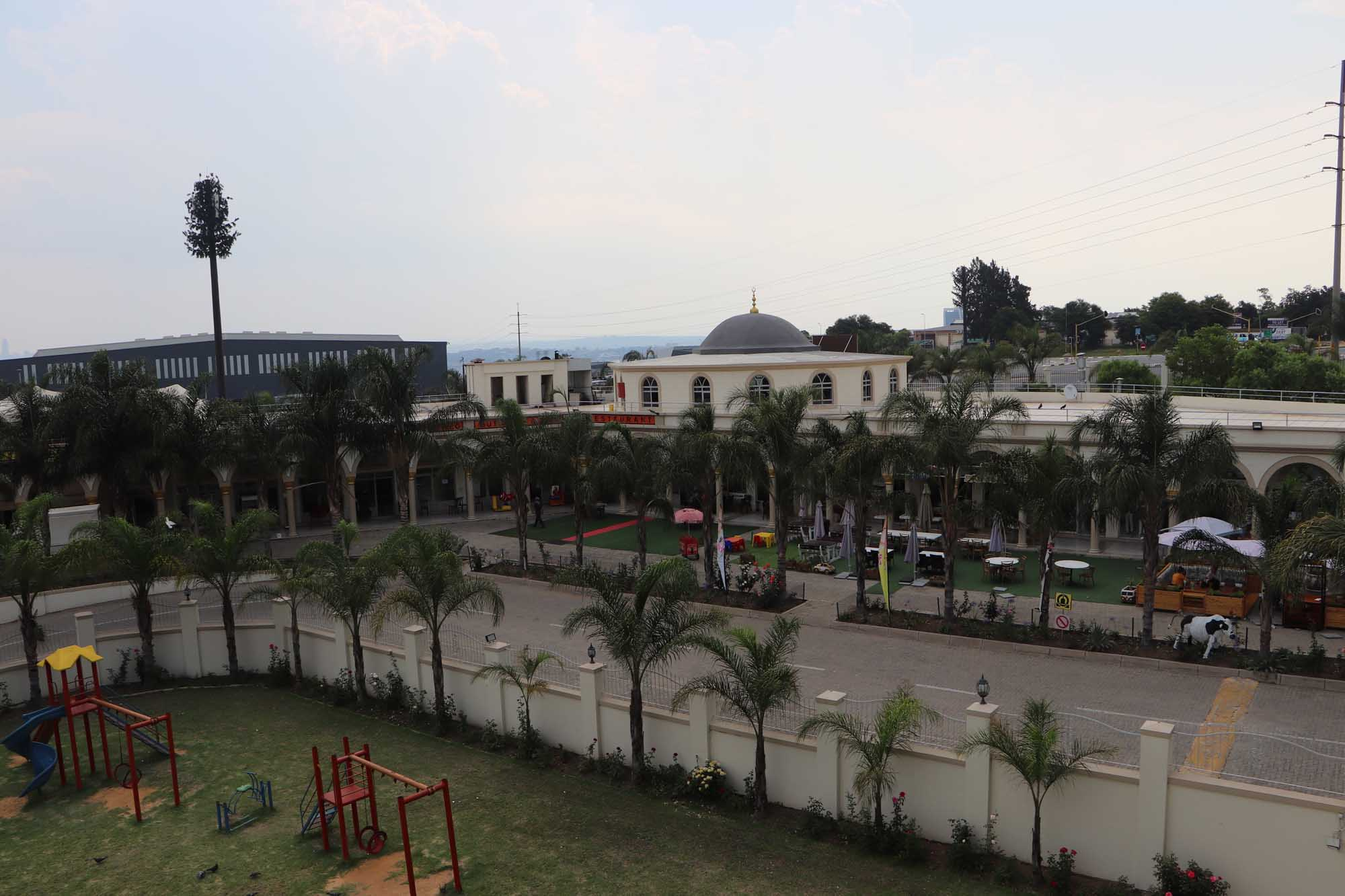
The adjacent bazaar

Close-up view of mosque

== See also ==
- History of Islam in South Africa
- Islamic art
- List of mosques in South Africa
- List of largest mosques
