= Usul ash-Shashi =

Hanafi school Islamic jurisprudence book

- Author: Unknown
- Original title: أصول الشاشي
- Language: Arabic
- Subject: Usul al-fiqh (principles of Islamic jurisprudence)
- Genre: Hanafi literature

Usul ash-Shashi (Arabic: أصول الشاشي, Uṣūl ash-Shāshī) is a text on usul al-fiqh (principles of Islamic jurisprudence) according to the Hanafi madhhab. It is studied as part of the Dars-i Nizami curriculum used in many Islamic seminaries, especially in South Asia. There is a debate over the identity of the work's author.
