= Muslim Students Association of South Africa =

Islamic organization based in South Africa

Union of Muslim Students' Associations (MSA) is an umbrella body representing the members of all respective Muslim Student Association chapters, regional bodies and other, across South Africa.

Established in 1974, the MSA is represented at almost every major university in South Africa, through its chapters.

It has grown to be one of the largest student representative bodies in South Africa, representing South African Muslim students at a provincial, national and international level.
