= SANHA =

South African halal certification authority

South African National Halaal Authority
- Abbreviation: SANHA
- Formation: 1996; 30 years ago
- Legal status: Non-profit
- Purpose: To evaluate, monitor and certify products as halal.
- Headquarters: Durban, KwaZulu-Natal
- Location: South Africa
- Website: sanha.org.za

South African National Halaal Authority (SANHA) is a registered non-profit organisation established in 1996. The authority aims to facilitate the availability and access to halal products both locally and internationally. SANHA has offices in KwaZulu-Natal, Gauteng, and Western Cape. The organisation has offices in Kwa-Zulu Natal, Gauteng, and Western Cape.

== Halal certification ==
SANHA evaluates and certifies products according to regulations and requirements set out by the Islamic Shari'ah. When a product meets the required criteria, certification is granted. Halal Certified products are permitted to display SANHA’s halal registered logo on packaging.
