= Madrasah In'aamiyyah =

Muslim school in Durban, South Africa

- Type: Islamic School
- Chancellor: Molana Mahmood Madni Desai
- Location: Camperdown, KwaZulu-Natal, South Africa
- Campus: Durban
- Website: http://www.alinaam.co.za/

The Madrasah In’aamiyyah Camperdown, is an institute of higher Islamic learning and teaching based in Camperdown, South Africa. A number of students from the United States, Canada, Belgium, India, Sri Lanka, Pakistan, Malaysia, Philippines, Mozambique, Malawi, Zambia and Australia are receiving education at the Madrasah.

== Education Pattern ==
The offers the following courses:

- Hifdhul Qur'an (memorizing the Qur'an): Consisting of 3 years. (depending on student capabilities year varies.)
- I’daadiyah: Introductory phase for Aalim course.
- Imaam / Khatib Training: Consisting of 1–3 years. This is to equip a person to be an Imaam and fulfill basic Islamic requirements of the community, for example, perform Salaat, Jumu’ah, Nikah, etc.
- Qiraat Hafs: (normal reading), Qiraat Sab’a: (7 dialects) and Asharah: (10 dialects).
- Aalim Course: Consisting of 6 years. It is equivalent to BA (Hons).
- Mufti course: Consisting of minimum 2 years.
- Specialty in Hadith: Consisting of 1 year.

== Syllabus of the Aalim course ==
A brief review of the subjects of the Aalim Course is given below:

- First Year: Mainly Learning Arabic.
- Second Year: Continue with learning Arabic, Fiqh, Usool-e-Fiqh and Tarjuma-e-Qur'an
- Third Year: Usool-e-Fiqh, Tarjuma-e-Qur'an, History
- Fourth Year: Fiqh, Usool-e-Fiqh, Tafseer
- Fifth Year: Hadith, Usool-e-Hadith, Fiqh
- Sixth Year: Sihaah-e-Sitta, All Sahih Books

== Publications ==
The Madrasah has published many books and articles under the authority of Academy for Islamic Research, Madrasah In’aamiyyah. These include:

- From the Treasures of Arabic Morphology by Maulana Ebrahim Muhammad
- A Disastrous Problem Faced by the Youth by Maulana Abdullah Ismail
- Etiquettes of Marital Relations

== See also ==
- Deobandi movement in South Africa
- List of Deobandi madrasas
