= Masihullah Khan =

Indian Islamic scholar (1911/1912–1992)

Muhammad Masihullah Khan محمد مسیح الله خان
- Title: Maulana, Masih al-Ummah

Personal life
- Born: 1911/1912 Barla, Aligarh District, United Provinces of Agra and Oudh, British India (now Uttar Pradesh, India)
- Died: 13 November 1992 (aged 79–81) Jalalabad, Muzaffarnagar District, India
- Resting place: Jalalabad
- Main interest: Sufism
- Notable work(s): The Path to Perfection, Shariat-o-Tasawwuf
- Education: Darul Uloom Deoband
- Occupation: Islamic scholar, Sufi shaykh

Religious life
- Religion: Islam
- Denomination: Sunni Islam
- Jurisprudence: Hanafi
- Tariqa: Chishtiya-Sabiriya-Imdadiya
- Creed: Maturidi
- Movement: Deobandi

Muslim leader
- Disciple of: Ashraf Ali Thanwi
- Influenced by: Ashraf Ali Thanwi, Muhammad Ilyas Kandhalvi, Hussain Ahmad Madani
- Influenced: Taqi Usmani

Muhammad Masihullah Khan Sherwani Jalalabadi (Urdu: محمد مسیح الله خان شیروانی جلال آبادی; 1911/1912 – 13 November 1992) was an Indian Deobandi Islamic scholar known as an authority in Sufism. He was among the senior authorised disciples of Ashraf Ali Thanwi, who gave him the title Masīh al-Ummah (transl. Comforter of the Ummah).

== Early life and education ==
Muhammad Masihullah Khan was born in 1329 or 1330 AH (1911/1912) in Sarai Barla, a village in the Aligarh district of Uttar Pradesh, India. His family was of the Sherwani tribe, a Sayyid tribe of Pathans. His father's name was Saeed Khan.

He was known for piety in his youth, and he often sat in the company of scholars and Sufis. He developed a close companionship with Muhammad Ilyas Kandhalvi, who introduced him to the books and lectures of Ashraf Ali Thanwi.

He received his early and secondary education in Barla, Aligarh, and enrolled in Darul Uloom Deoband in 1347 AH (1929 AD) and graduated from there in 1349 AH (1931 AD). He continued there for another two years after graduation, spending time on Islamic logic and philosophy.

His teachers at Deoband Seminary included Hussain Ahmad Madani, Izaz Ali Amrohi, Asghar Hussain Deobandi, Ibrahim Balyawi, Rasool Khan Hazarvi, and Murtaza Hasan Chandpuri.

He was an authorised disciple of Ashraf Ali Thanwi in Sufism. During his student days, he pledged allegiance to Thanwi, and in 1351 AH, Thanwi gave him permission to pledge allegiance.

== Career ==
In 1357 AH (1938/1939 AD), Thanwi sent him as a teacher in a madrasa (an Islamic school) named Madrasa Miftahul Uloom in Jalalabad, Muzaffarnagar (now Jalalabad, Shamli). At that time, this madrasa was only established as a school. But within a few years, due to the hard work of Masihullah, this madrasa started to be counted among the big Islamic seminars in India.

== Literary works ==
- Shariat-o-Tasawwuf
- The Path to Perfection

== Death ==
Masihullah died on Friday, November 13, 1992 AD (Jumada I 17, 1413 AH), and was buried the same day after the Friday prayer. The funeral prayer was led by Mufti Inayatullah, and his funeral was attended by over 250,000 people. He was buried in the cemetery next to the madrasa.
