= Jamiatul Ulama South Africa =

Islamic organization based in South Africa

The Jamiatul Ulama Transvaal now the Jamiatul Ulama South Africa (Council of Muslim Theologians), headquartered in Fordsburg, Johannesburg, was founded in 1923 to serve the Muslim community of the (now defunct) Transvaal Province of South Africa. It publishes a weekly online newsletter.

== Activities ==
It currently operates in the provinces that formerly made up the Transvaal, as well as in the Free State Province, and is one of a number of national Muslim organizations in South Africa.

The organization has been characterized as fundamentalist and Deobandi, and it is widely perceived as having links with the Tablighi Jamaat.

Large number of Muslims subscribe to decisions regarding fiqh (Islamic law) in the region where the organization operates. It also has significant influence on the running of many mosques and madrasas in the region.

== Controversies ==
=== Apartheid-era ===
The Jamiatul Ulama South Africa has been criticised for its largely apolitical stance during the apartheid era. The organization, unlike its counterpart in KwaZulu-Natal, the Jamiatul Ulama KwaZulu-Natal was accused by more activist Islamic scholars at the Truth and Reconciliation Commission of not speaking out against the tricameral system, which denied black South Africans political power, while giving limited rights to Coloureds and Indians.

=== Radio Islam ===
The Jamiatul Ulama South Africa owns and manages a community radio station called Radio Islam that broadcasts on the Witwatersrand. A complaint was made by an organization to the Independent Communications Authority of South Africa in 1998 that the radio station was not allowing women to be heard on air. The station argued that Islam does not allow women's voices to be heard. The authority ruled against the station, and in response, the station collected a petition of 28,000 names from women who it claimed supported the decision to bar women from the airwaves.

=== Muhammad cartoons controversy ===
The organization again made headlines in 2006 when it obtained an interdict against several South African newspaper companies in the Johannesburg High Court against the republishing of cartoons depicting the Islamic prophet, Muhammad. See: Jyllands-Posten Muhammad cartoons controversy. This case raised important questions about the limits of freedom of expression in South Africa.

== See also ==
- List of Deobandi organisations
