= List of mosques in South Africa =

This is a list of mosques in South Africa.

== List ==
Name	Image	Location	Year (CE)	Group	Notes
Auwal Mosque		Bo-Kaap, Cape Town	1794		The first mosque in South Africa
Palm Tree Mosque		Cape Town	1807		Built initially as a house in 1788, repurposed as a mosque in 1807.
Nurul Islam Mosque		Bo-Kaap, Cape Town	1834	Su	
Queen Victoria Mosque		Bo-Kaap, Cape Town	c. 1850	Su	A national heritage site; affiliated with the Shafi'i school.
Juma Mosque		Durban, KwaZulu-Natal	1881	Su	Progressively expanded from 1881 through to the 20th century; with capacity for more than 6,000 worshipers, it is the largest mosque in South Africa.
Riverside Soofie Mosque and Mausoleum		Durban, KwaZulu-Natal	c. 1895	Su	A national heritage site
Kerk Street Mosque		Johannesburg	1918		Founded in the 1880s, the first mosque was built in 1918 and rebuilt in 1990, as designed by Abdel-Wahed El-Wakil.
Nizamiye Mosque		Midrand, Johannesburg	2012	Su	Can accommodate more than 6,000 worshipers; affiliated with the Gülen movement

== See also ==
- Islam in South Africa
- List of mosques in Africa
