= Indian Market, Durban =

Street market in KwaZulu-Natal, South Africa

Site of the Indian Market which was burnt down under apartheid, in 1973. Now known as Victoria Street Market

The Victoria Street Market is a South African market in Durban (EThekwini, KwaZulu-Natal), dating back to 1890, which grew from traders who set up in the Grey Street Mosque. Today, "the Vic" has hundreds of stalls selling various foods, traditional artwork, and goods. The building is a two story bazaar located on Bertha Mkhize Street, colored bright pink, green, yellow and purple.

Its location is Durban's oldest retail space. The site, once colloquially known as the “Indian Market”, burnt down under suspicious circumstances in 1973. The undercover market was rebuilt in the 1980’s and officially opened by an Afrikaans businessman, Anton Rupert in 1990.

The market itself was probably not named after Queen Victoria, but after Victoria, Princess Royal, German Empress and Queen of Prussia, the eldest daughter of the queen, whose name is associated with the street where the original Indian Market was built.

== History ==
Following the abolition of the slave trade (1807), and the abolition of slavery (1833), over 1.3 million workers from British India were contracted under the Indian indenture system to European colonies.

=== Indentured Labour ===
From 1860 to 1911, 152 184 indentured Indians from south East Asians served as indentured labourers in Natal. They came from Tamil Nadu, Andhra Pradesh, Bihar and Uttar Pradesh and became a source of cheap labour to the "sugarocracy” the owners of sugar mills and plantations. These bonded labourers were predominantly Hindus of the lower caste and completed contracts with companies such as

- Reynolds Brothers Ltd (operated by Frank and Charles Reynolds)
- Natal Estates Limited (founded by Marshall Campbell)
- the Tongaat Sugar Company (founded by Edward Renault Saunders)
- Hulett Sugar (founded by Liege Hulett).

KULI (in Tamil) means payment for menial or occasional work as a porter or labourers. No loger under contract, they could return to India or remain in the colony they paid a licence fee of three pounds (£3) a year. This also applied to children over 16 years of age. 60% of indentured labourers chose to remain in South Africa as residents Some "coolies" turned to market gardening to accumulate capital and brought fresh produce from surrounds, into the borough of Durban. But life for many indentured workers and their descendants remained challenging since they did not possess the means to take on the collective might of their employers or sirdars.

=== Passenger Indians ===
From 1869, South East Asian immigrants known as "Passenger" or "Free Indians" also began migrating to the Natal colony, The majority of these traders were Muslims from Gujarat and their passage from India to Natal was independently funded. Mahatma Gandhi relocation to South Africa in 1893. was under a year-long contract position with an Indian business firm based in Natal. Much like passenger and indentured Indians who were treated badly on their arrival, he too experienced disrespect and discrimination.

=== Produce Market ===
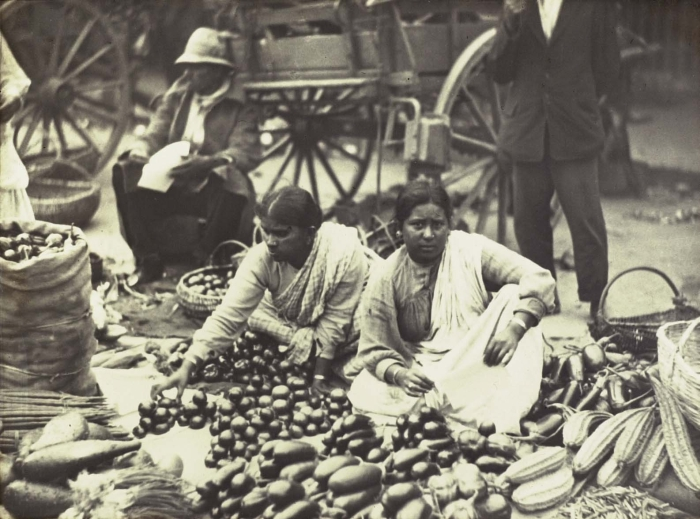
Market Gardiners at the Durban market (COLLECTIE TROPENMUSEUM)

The Grey Street Mosque trustees permitted Hindu and Muslim entrepreneurs to sell their produce on their premises. As numbers of traders increased, commerce expanded out onto the Victoria Street. From Monday to Saturday, approximately 2000 vegetable and fruit sellers would arrive with their carts in the late evening, sleep under them and then be ready for trade the next morning. Since they did not own premises, they sold their produce and wares from carts. Those who did not have carts sold from boxes and crates. They squatted cross-legged on the street - and thus the name the "Squatters Market". Certain residents viewed these traders as a public nuisance and to manage the situation and extract revenue, the Durban Town Council built an under-cover market to control the influx of traders and market gardeners in and out of the city. Different interest groups could be identified in the various Victoria Street markets. Many traders were descendants of "passengers" and their stalls were under cover while ex-indentured Indians and their descendants predominated on the street. Stallholders at the Indian market were often in conflict with street vendors, which led to political divisions.

== The "Union" of South Africa ==
The Indian Market was built by the Durban Town Council in 1910, a year before indentured labour was abolished in Natal. In 1910, the Union of South Africa was proclaimed and the South African system of indentured labour was legally abolished in 1911. It would be 50 years before Indians in South Africa would be recognized as citizens. Some Indians had become land owners and 10,000 acres of land in Natal were owned by these families. By contrast, 53,688 acres were held by sugar production companies. Those who did not own land or work as market gardeners, worked for the state (Durban Corporation, the Harbour Board, the railways) and locally owned industries.

== Key dates ==
1890
Hindu and Muslim market gardeners begin selling their produce at Grey Street Mosque
1910
The Indian Market is opened by the Durban Municipality
1910
Multiple issues are reported between stall owners and vendors in the market and on the street
1911
Indentured labour in abolished
1934
The sale of cooked food is prohibited by the Durban Corporation and restaurant concessions are awarded in the Indian market.
1934
Warwick early morning market established and the Indian Market became an outlet for more diversified goods.
1949
Anti-India Pogrom / Durban Riots were sparked by an altercation at the Indian Market.
1957
Indian Market reported by the as a fire hazard by the Chief Officer of the Fire station. The Medical Officer of Health warns that food poisoning is likely because of sanitary conditions and the City Engineer’s Department proposed a freeway on the site of the Indian market.
1973
Fire at the Indian Market and two-thirds of the stalls were gutted. The Bulk Sales Hall, located alongside the African Market, is where some stall holders were relocated to. Other stallholders and their employees were left destitute, and indian businessmen and industrialists offered employment.
1978
The Indian market is demolished.
1990
The Victoria Street Market is officially reopened in July by Dr Anton Rupert, chairman of the Small Business Development Corporation (SBDC)

== Present day ==
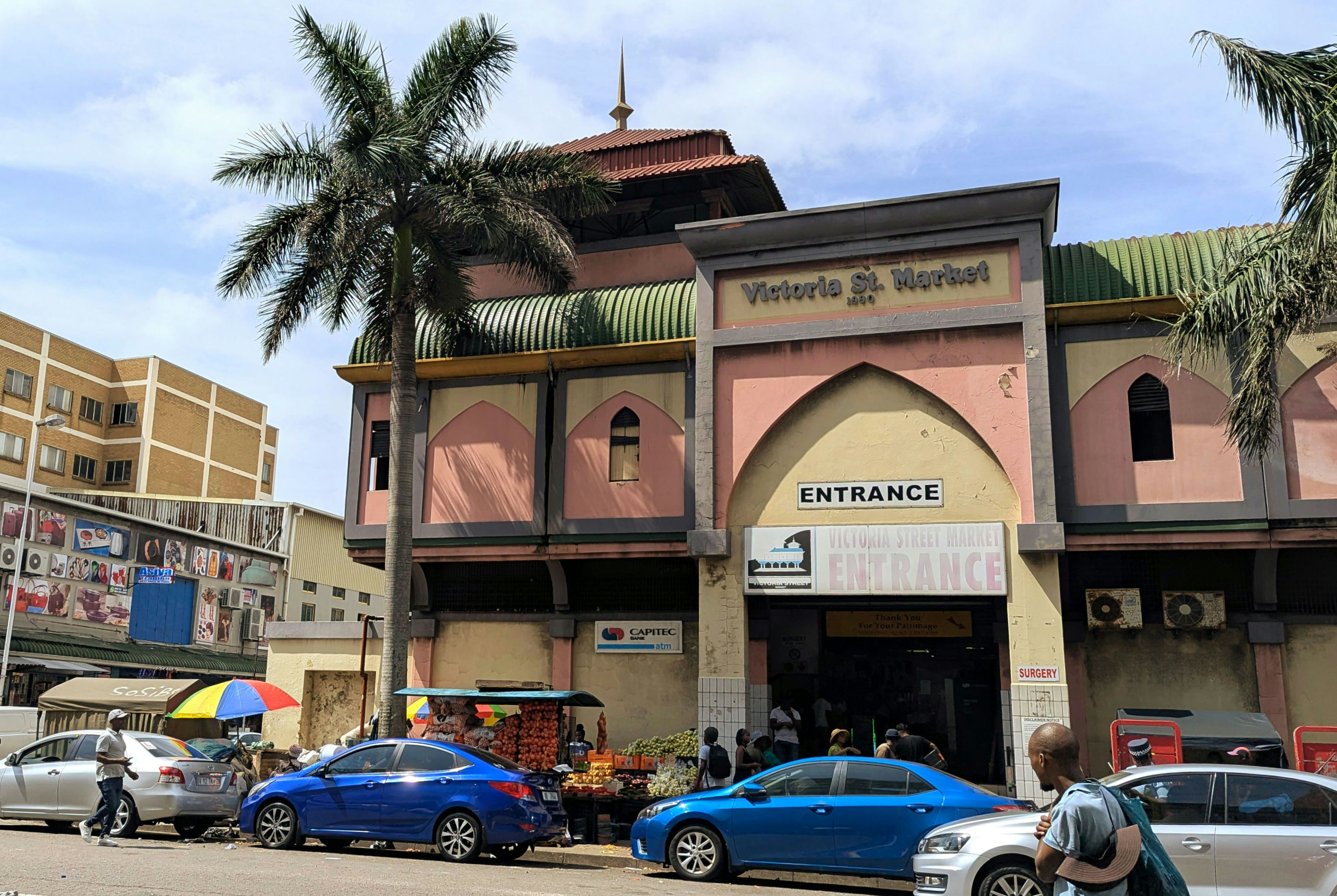
Entrance to the Victoria Street Market

The Victoria Street Market has a tumultuous history. It has been a site of class, caste, religious, and racial struggles. The intersections between traders, between Indians and the local state, amongst Muslims, Hindu's and Christians have had a range of consequences. The area today is a "melting pot of cultures and diversity" with multiple stall holders and vendors from third and fourth-generation families selling a variety of products. Victoria Street Market has been described by tourist publications as having an "Afro-Oriental" culture. The market can also be seen for the role it played in the struggle for Indian recognition and democracy. Traders today are shareholders in the Victoria Market and the shops are owned under sectional title.
