= Auwal Mosque =

Oldest mosque South Africa

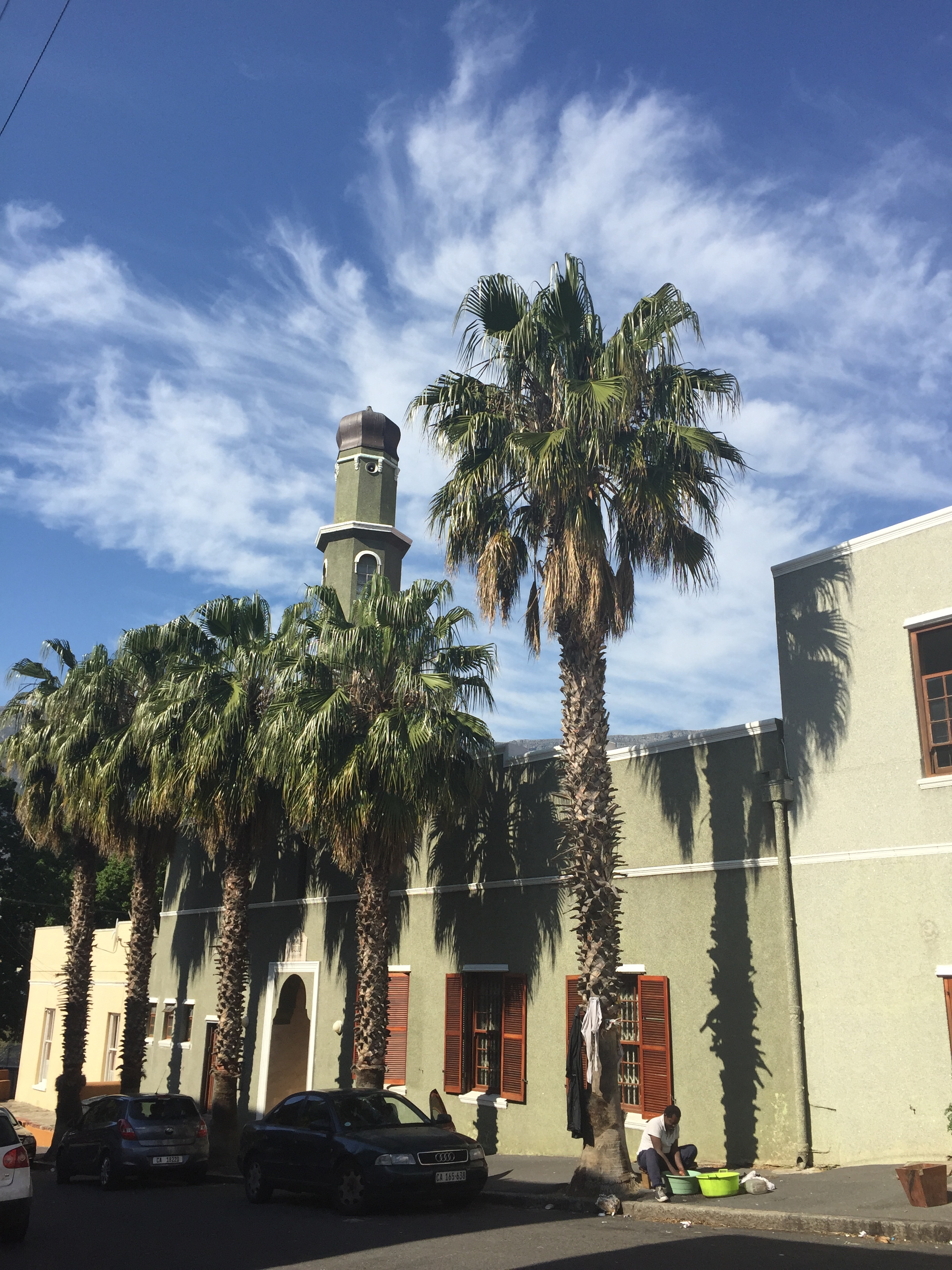
- The mosque in 2015

- Location of the mosque in Cape Town

Religion
- Affiliation: Islam
- Ecclesiastical or organizational status: Mosque
- Leadership: Moulana Mugammad Carr; Sheikh Ismail Londt
- Status: Active

Location
- Location: Bo-Kaap, Cape Town
- Country: South Africa
- Interactive map of Auwal Mosque
- Coordinates: 33°55′20″S 18°24′54″E

Architecture
- Type: Mosque
- Style: Islamic
- Established: 1790s (community)
- Completed: 1794 (built); 1907 and 1936 (renovations)
- Minaret: 1

The Auwal Mosque, alternatively spelled Awwal, Owal or Owwal, is a mosque in the Bo-Kaap neighbourhood of Cape Town, South Africa. It was completed in 1794 and was the first mosque established in South Africa.

== History ==
It was constructed in 1794 during the first British occupation of the Cape on land belonging to Coridon van Ceylon, a Vryezwarten (freed Black Muslim slave). Coridon's daughter, Saartjie van de Kaap, inherited the property that was being used as a warehouse, and donated it for the use as South Africa's first mosque. The mosque was constructed in 1794 with renovations completed in 1907 and extensive renovations done in 1936. It is the first mosque to observe public prayers and is where Cape Muslim traditions and the Arabic-Afrikaans language were first taught. It remains a symbol for Muslims of the recognition of Islam and the freedom of slaves to worship.

Qadi Abdussalam, affectionately known as Tuan Guru, was appointed the first imam. Tuan Guru was a religious leader and political prisoner. While in prison, he wrote the entire Quran from memory. This Quran is on display at the Auwal Mosque. Tuan Guru also used the mosque as a madrasa, or "religious" school, where he instructed both children and adults in matters of Islam. After Guru's death, Saartjie van de Kaap's husband, Achmad of Bengal, assumed the position of imam. This position was to be held by members of his family until the last imam from this family, Gasan Achmat, died in 1980. The position has since been filled by many imams, including the likes of Sheikh Salih Abadi. Currently, Moulana Mugammad Carr and Sheikh Ismail Londt are joint imams.

Due to a dispute as to who was to be the next imam of the congregation, a portion of the Auwal congregation split off in 1807 and formed Cape Town's second mosque, the Palm Tree Mosque on Long Street.

== See also ==
- Islam in South Africa
- List of mosques in South Africa
