= Queen Victoria Mosque =

Mosque in Cape Town, South Africa

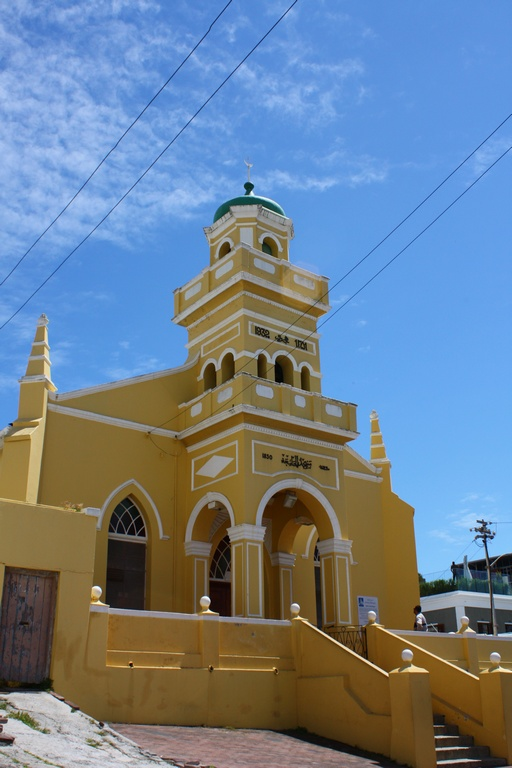
- The mosque in 2011

- Location of the mosque in Cape Town

Religion
- Affiliation: Sunni Islam
- Rite: Shafi'i school
- Ecclesiastical or organizational status: Mosque
- Status: Active

Location
- Location: 62 Chiappinni Street, Bo-Kaap, Cape Town
- Country: South Africa
- Interactive map of Queen Victoria Mosque
- Coordinates: 33°55′22″S 18°24′44″E

Architecture
- Type: Mosque
- Completed: c. 1850

Specifications
- Dome: 1 (maybe more)
- Minaret: 2 (maybe more)

The Queen Victoria Mosque, also called the Jamia Mosque, is a mosque, situated at the corner of Chiappini and Castle street, in Cape Town, South Africa. Completed in the 1850s, it is considered to be the first and oldest mosque in Cape Town, and the largest in the Bo-Kaap area of Cape Town. The mosque is a National heritage site.

== History ==
While some sources mention that the mosque was built in 1850, (Note: Worden, et al. (2004) mention that the mosque was built in 1850.) others mention that the land for building the mosque was granted in 1851. (Note: Hutchinson (2006) writes that the mosque site was approved only on 19 October 1851 and the title deeds were transferred three years thence.) Affiliated with the Shafi'i school it was the first mosque built on land that was specifically given for a mosque site by the British Crown. This may have been one reason it was referred to as Queen Victoria Mosque. Another reason it was referred to thus could have been the involvement of the British Crown in resolving disputes within the Muslim community. The Jamia mosque site was granted to the Cape Muslims with the expressed assurance that it be utilised by all Muslims regardless of their differences. The land grant resulted out of conditions in the Colony in 1846. (Note: In 1804, the Cape was threatened by war; the increasing clashes on the Eastern Frontier required the complete trust of those who lived in the Colony, leading to the inclination to appease the Muslim community.)

== See also ==
- Islam in South Africa
- List of mosques in South Africa
