= Kerk Street Mosque =

Mosque in Johannesburg, South Africa

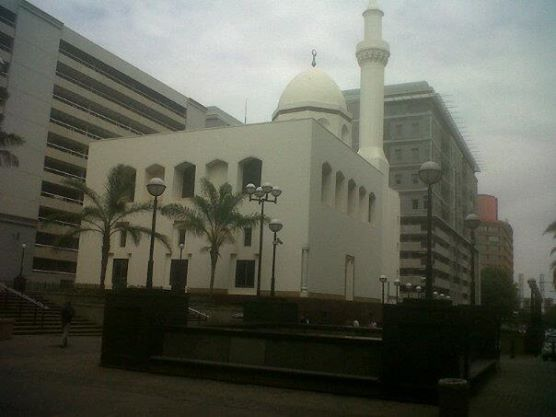
- The mosque, seen from Sauer Street

- Location of the mosque in Greater Johannesburg

Religion
- Affiliation: Islam
- Ecclesiastical or organisational status: Mosque
- Ownership: Jumaat Masjied Society
- Status: Active

Location
- Location: Kerk Street, Johannesburg
- Country: South Africa
- Interactive map of Kerk Street Mosque

Architecture
- Architects: Mohammad Wayat (1918); Suliman Oman Waja (1918); Abdel-Wahed El-Wakil (1990)
- Type: Mosque
- Style: New Classical
- Established: c. 1890s
- Completed: 1918 (first mosque); 1990 (current mosque)

Specifications
- Capacity: 2,000 worshippers
- Dome: 1
- Minaret: 1
- Site area: 740 m^{2} (8,000 sq ft)
- Materials: Brick; masonry

The Kerk Street Mosque, also known as the Jumah Mosque, (Note: Jumah means Friday, the most important day for Muslim prayer.) is a mosque in Johannesburg, South Africa. The mosque, situated on stand 788, is one of the oldest mosques and places of worship in Johannesburg.

== History ==
The first Muslim community to occupy the land set up a tent in the closing years of the nineteenth century, then in 1906 built a wood and corrugated iron structure. In 1918 construction of a brick walled structure was completed. The brick mosque was demolished in 1990 and was replaced with the modern Kerk Street Mosque designed by Driehaus Prize winner Abdel-Wahed El-Wakil.

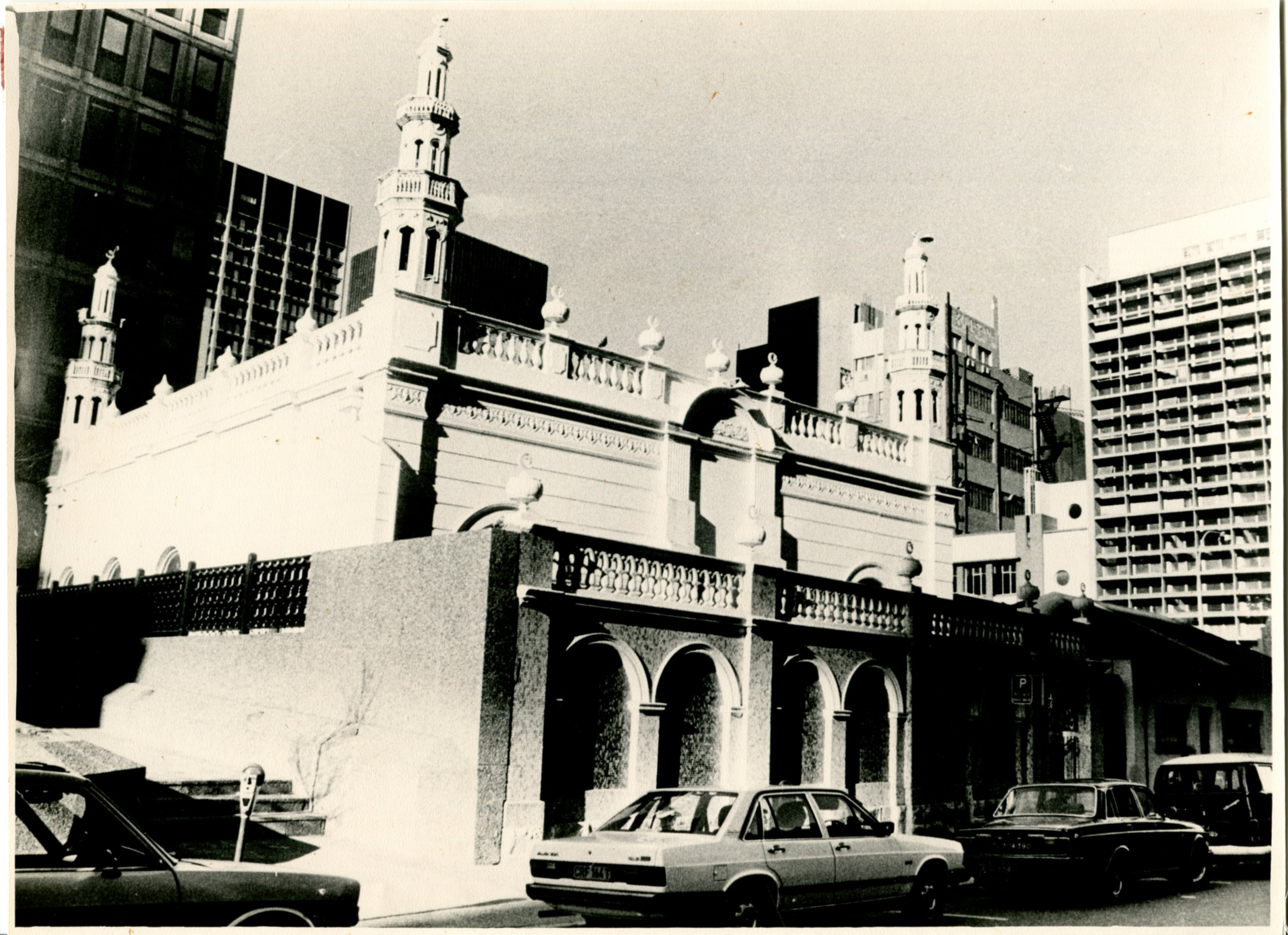
The old Kerk Street Mosque in 1985, which was demolished to give way to the new building.

== Design ==
The site measures 740 m^{2} (8,000 sq ft), bounded by Sauer Street and Kerk Street. The site has been used as a mosque since the 1890s, with the first formal structure was built on the site in 1918. Structural collapse and inadequate facilities led to the commissioning of the current project. The mosque follows the city grid of Johannesburg on the outside; the inside is oriented to face Mecca which, from Johannesburg, is 11° east of due north.

Architect Muhammad Mayet's design has a substantial vocabulary of traditional elements contained within its various parts: domes, squinches, pendentives, fan vault and cross vaults. Artisans from Morocco were flown in to do the intricate plasterwork, a craftsman from Egypt was responsible for the wood carving and Turkish professionals hand carved the delicate marble used to adorn the mosque. The exterior is plastered and painted white, creating a plain but elegant appearance that allows the form to be clearly read.

The prayer hall consists of a series of arches on pillars with segmental arches over supporting segmental vaults which run parallel to the Qibla wall. The vaults are interrupted in the middle by a dome which establishes a central axis pointing towards Makkah. The direction of Makkah is emphasized by the main dome on the north side which is raised on a drum which filters light into the interior directly above the mihrab.

The building is of load-bearing brick and masonry construction built on top of a combination of pile and raft concrete foundations. This construction means the temperature inside the mosque remains a constant 23 °C (73 °F). The mosque can accommodate up to 2,000 worshippers.

== Heritage status ==
The mosque was declared a national monument by the National Monument Council "because of its historical, aesthetic and cultural value".

== See also ==
- Islam in South Africa
- List of mosques in South Africa
