= Riverside Soofie Mosque and Mausoleum =

Sunni mosque and heritage site in Durban, South Africa

Riverside Soofie Mosque
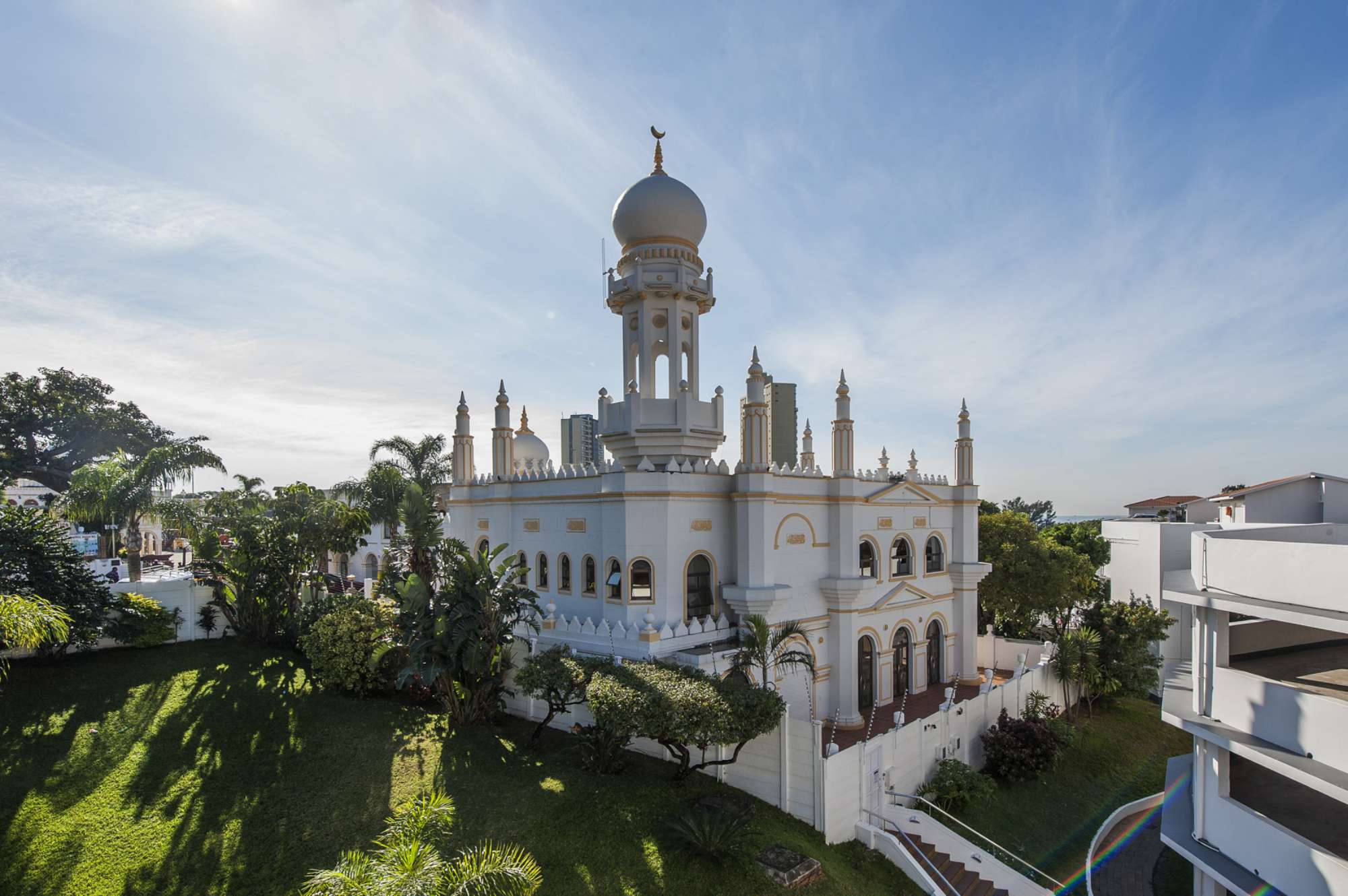
- The mosque in 2018

- Location of the mosque in Greater Durban

Religion
- Affiliation: Sunni Islam
- Ecclesiastical or organizational status: Mosque; Mausoleum
- Status: Active

Location
- Location: 50 Lower Bridge Road, Athlone, Durban, KwaZulu-Natal
- Country: South Africa
- Interactive map of Riverside Soofie Mosque
- Coordinates: 29°54′17″S 30°57′48″E

Architecture
- Type: Mosque
- Founder: Soofie Saheb
- Completed: c. 1895

Specifications
- Dome: 1 (maybe more)
- Minaret: Many

The Riverside Soofie Mosque and Mausoleum is a mosque, mausoleum, and provincial heritage site in Durban, in the KwaZulu-Natal province of South Africa.

In 1980 it was described in the Government Gazette as

This mosque was erected by the celebrated Soofie Saheb, who immigrated to South Africa in 1895. He was responsible for the construction of 11 other mosques, the establishment of 13 madresas and the laying out of a large number of cemeteries. Soofie Saheb passed away on the 29th June 1911 and his body lies interred in the octagonal mausoleum which he had originally built for his spiritual master.

They are two of the holiest Muslim shrines in South Africa. The octagonal mausoleum was declared a National Monument on 17 October 1980.

== See also ==
- Islam in South Africa
- List of mosques in South Africa
- List of heritage sites in South Africa
