= Nurul Islam Mosque =

Mosque in Bo-Kaap, Cape Town, South Africa

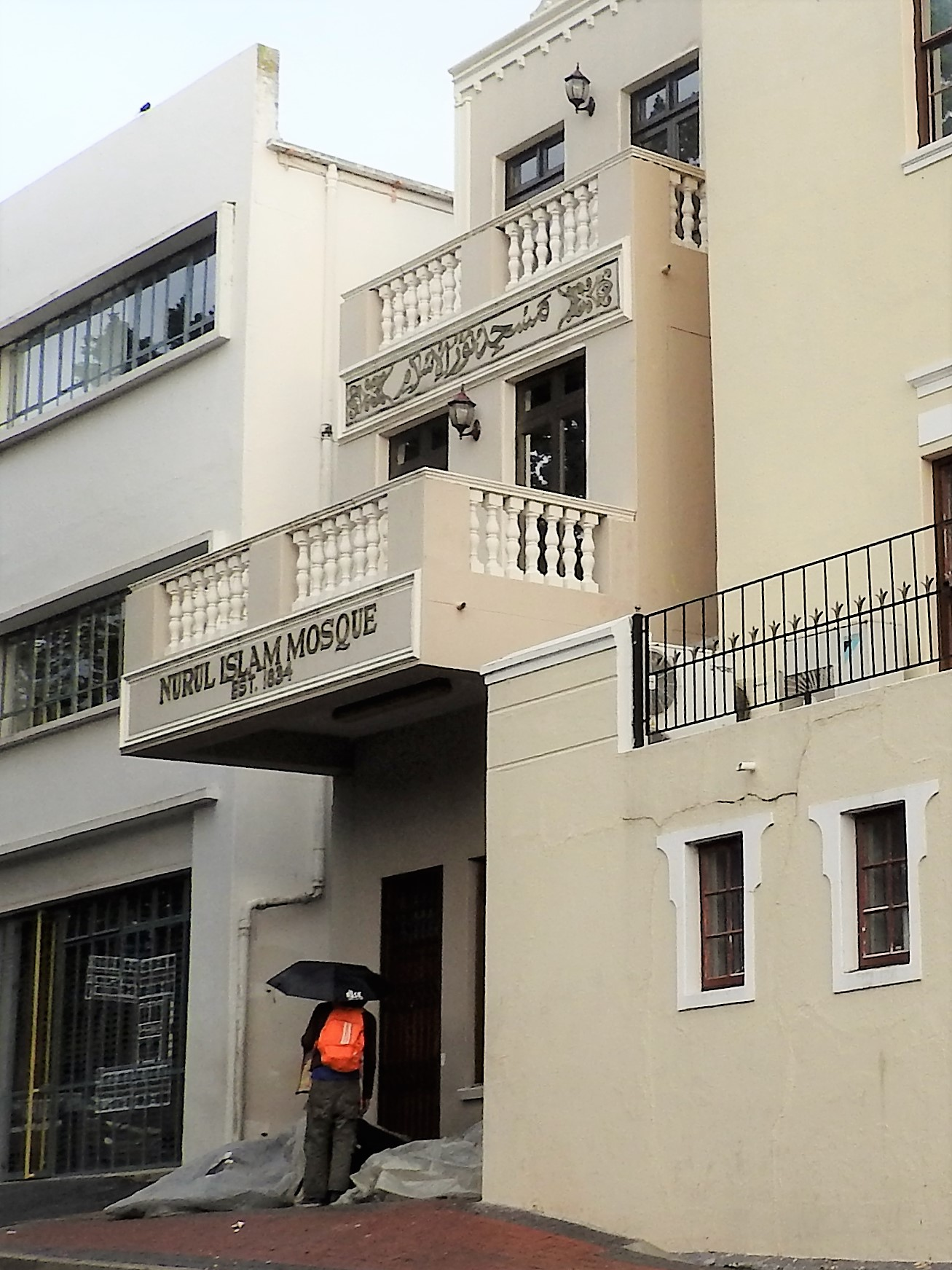
- The mosque in 2018

- Location of the mosque in central Cape Town

Religion
- Affiliation: Sunni Islam
- Ecclesiastical or organizational status: Mosque
- Status: Active

Location
- Location: Bo-Kaap, Cape Town
- Country: South Africa
- Interactive map of Nurul Islam Mosque
- Coordinates: 33°55′19″S 18°24′56″E

Architecture
- Type: Mosque
- Established: 1834
- Capacity: 700 worshipers

The Nurul Islam Mosque is a Sunni Islam mosque in the Bo-Kaap area of Cape Town, South Africa. When it was founded in 1834, the structure could hold 150 worshipers. Renovated in 2001, it can now hold 700 worshipers.

== See also ==
- Islam in South Africa
- List of mosques in South Africa
