= Juma Mosque, Durban =

Sunni mosque in Durban, South Africa

Juma Mosque of Durban
- Arabic: جُـمُـعَـة مَـسْـجِـد
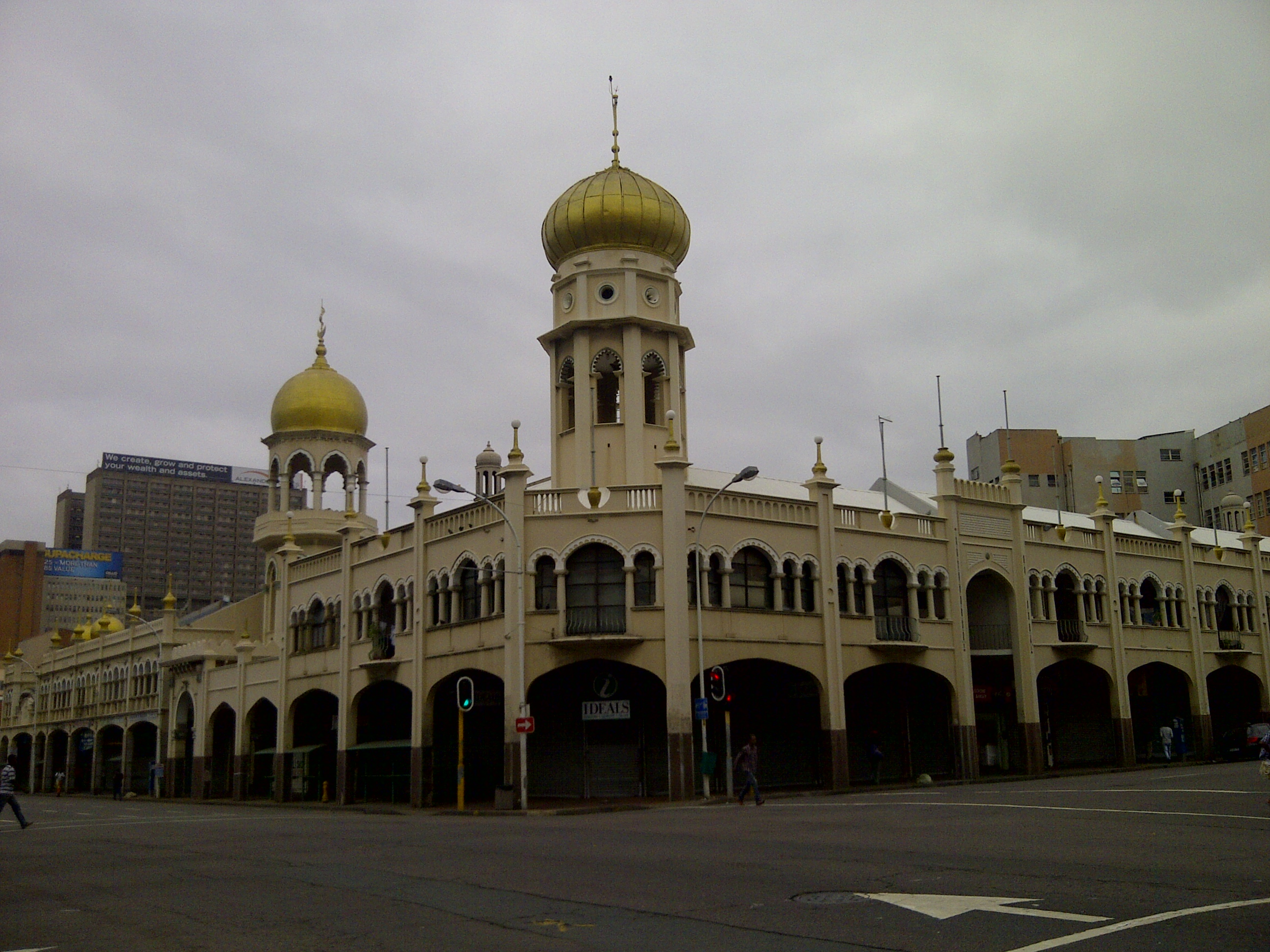
- The mosque in 2014

- Location of the mosque in Greater Durban

Religion
- Affiliation: Sunni Islam
- Ecclesiastical or organisational status: Jama masjid (congregational mosque)
- Status: Active

Location
- Location: Dr. Yusuf Dadoo Street and Cathedral Road, Durban, Kwazulu-Natal
- Country: South Africa
- Interactive map of Juma Mosque of Durban
- Coordinates: 29°51′26″S 31°01′00″E

Architecture
- Architects: Payne & Payne (1927); William Bruce Barboure (1943)
- Type: Mosque
- Style: Union vernacular; Islamic
- Groundbreaking: 1904
- Completed: 1930

Specifications
- Capacity: 6,000 (7,000 in 2014 for Salat al Eid)
- Minaret: 8

The Juma Mosque of Durban (Arabic: جُـمُـعَـة مَـسْـجِـد, romanized: Jumu‘ah Masjid, lit. 'Mosque of the Congregation'), also known as the Grey Street Mosque, is a Sunni Islam jama masjid (congregational mosque) located in Durban, Kwazulu-Natal in South Africa.

== History and origin ==
In August 1881, a site was bought by Aboobaker Amod Jhaveri and Hajee Mohamed in Grey Street (now known as Dr. Yusuf Dadoo Street) from K. Munsamy for £115 for the construction of a mosque. A tiny brick and mortar structure which stood on the site was converted into the mosque.

In February 1884 Aboobaker's estate bought land next to the mosque to enable its further expansion. In 1889 Hajee Mahomed Dada, in his capacity as the only surviving trustee of the mosque purchased more adjoining land due to the swift rise in the number of worshipers. The first of the two minarets on the mosque was constructed in 1904. At the same time, two shops were built alongside the mosque providing an income for its maintenance. A second minaret was added to the mosque in 1905 and several rooms, toilets and shower facilities were also added at the rear of the mosque for travelers to use. Rooms were also built for the Mu‘adh-dhin (Arabic: جُـمُـعَـة مَـسْـجِـد, who calls worshipers to prayer).

These minarets were at time two of the highest structures in the city of Durban. The mosque was rebuilt in 1927 following the design of the architects Payne & Payne. In 1943 William Bruce Barboure also contributed to the design of the building. The building is a unique blend of Islamic decorations and strong Union period vernacular style. The mosque is actually a series of interlinking buildings, arcades and corridors, in which commerce, religion and community exist in equilibrium.

Further extensions and alterations were made to the mosque in 1943. Today the mosque building is a large plastered structure which features a mixture of various styles. A bridge extends from the neighbouring girls' school to the roof of the mosque. The flat roof, which is used for prayer during festivals is used as a playground during school days as the school is not equipped with one. The style of the mosque is essentially geometrical. The windows and inter-leading doors and the arched doorways all stress this geometrical design. It's gilt-domed minarets protrude above the bustling commercial area, but inside the marbled worship hall is peaceful and boasts a simple elegance. The mosque until the late 1970s enjoyed the status of being the largest mosque in the southern hemisphere.

== Gallery ==
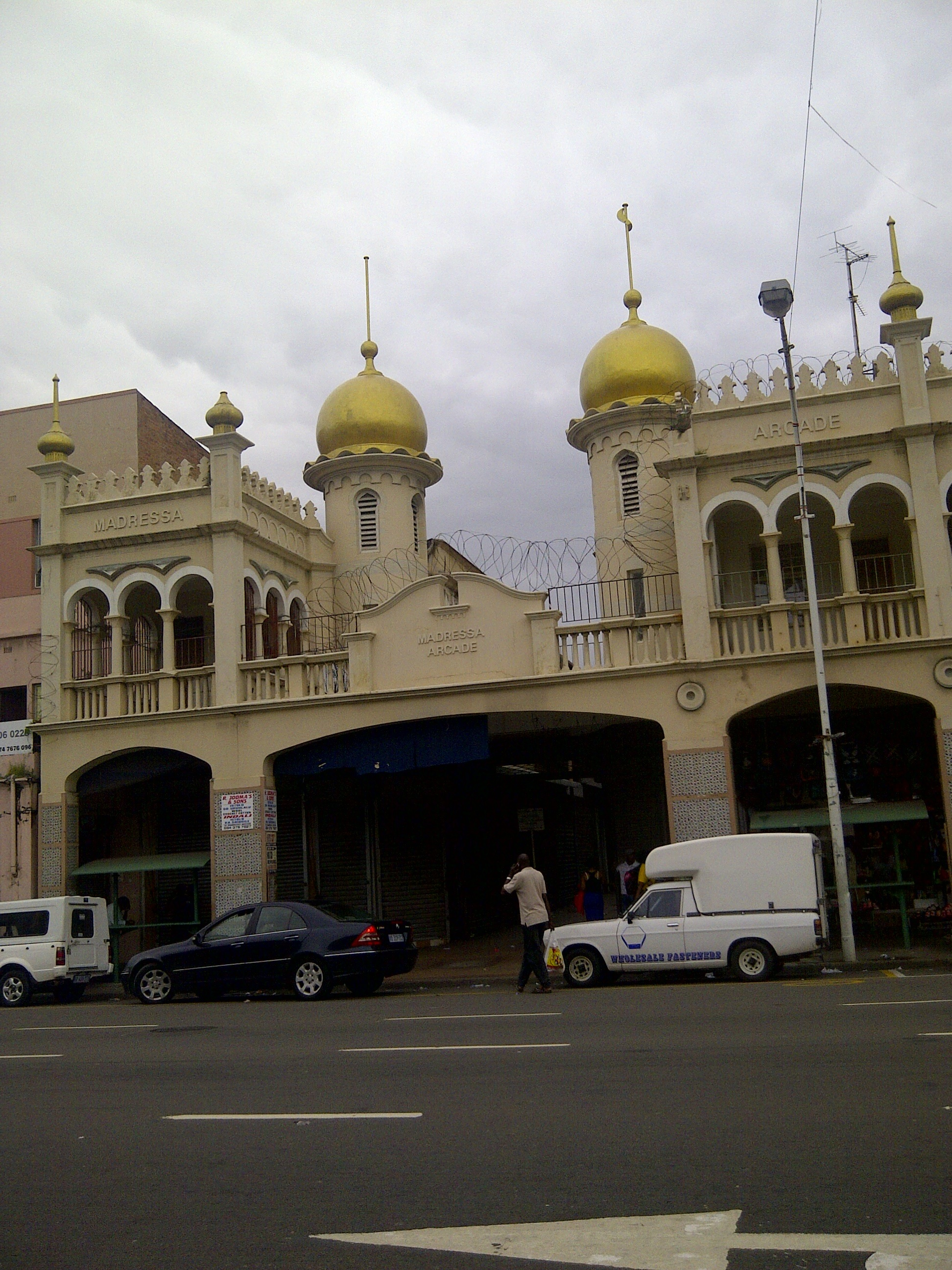
Madrassa Arcade on Dr. Yusuf Dadoo Street in 2014

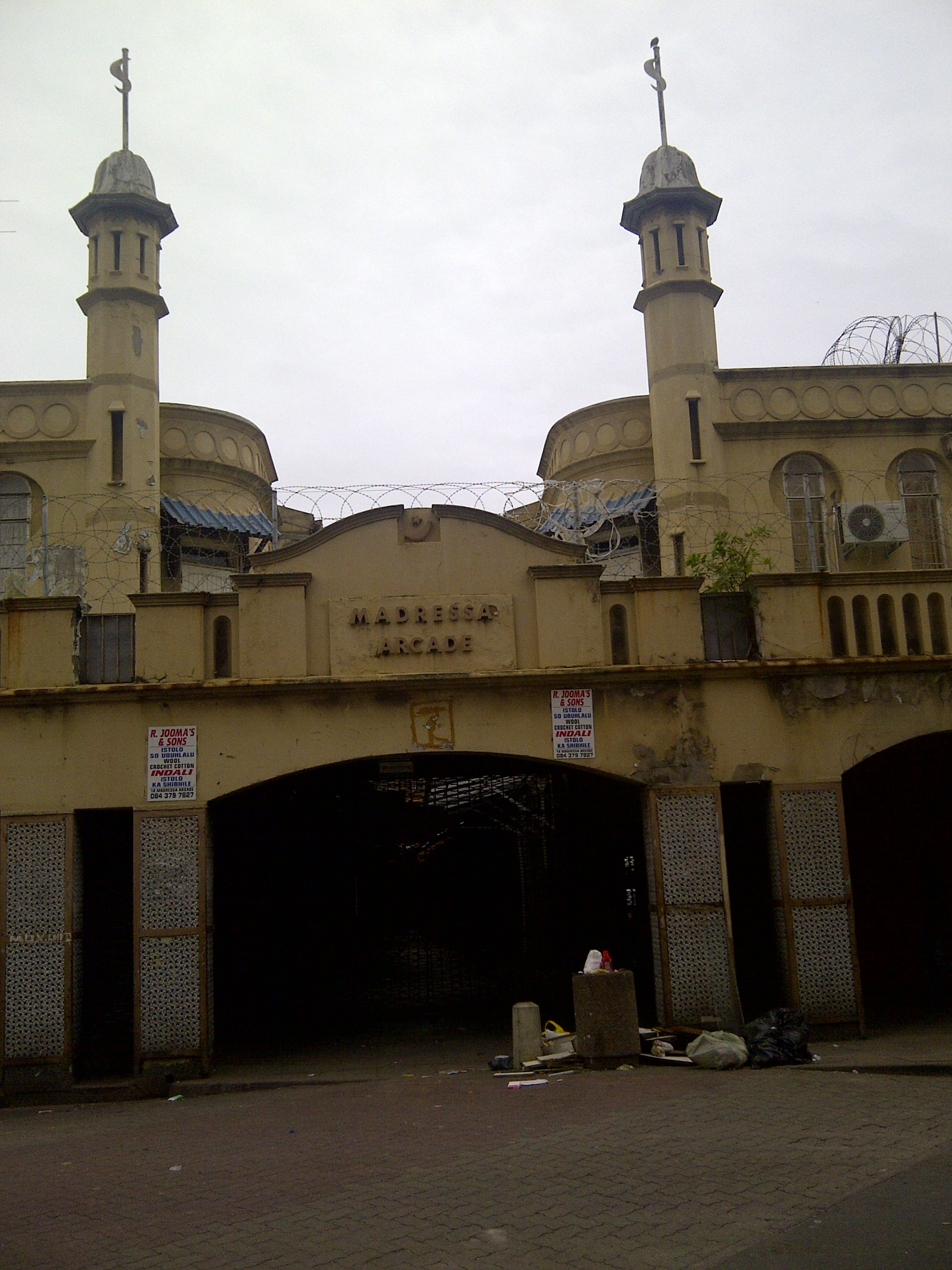
Madrassa Arcade on Cathedral Road in 2014

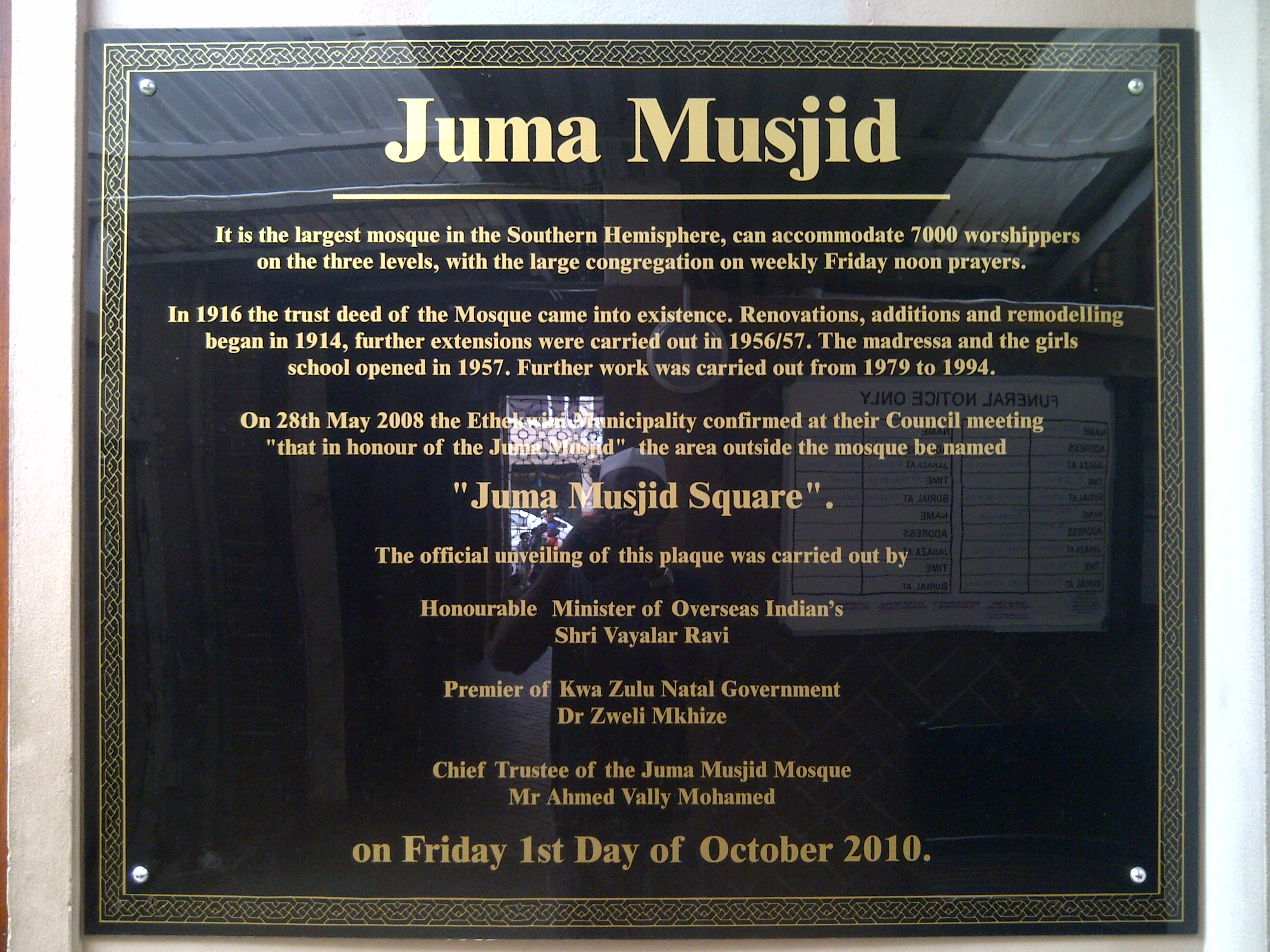
Juma Masjid Mosque and Juma Masjid Square

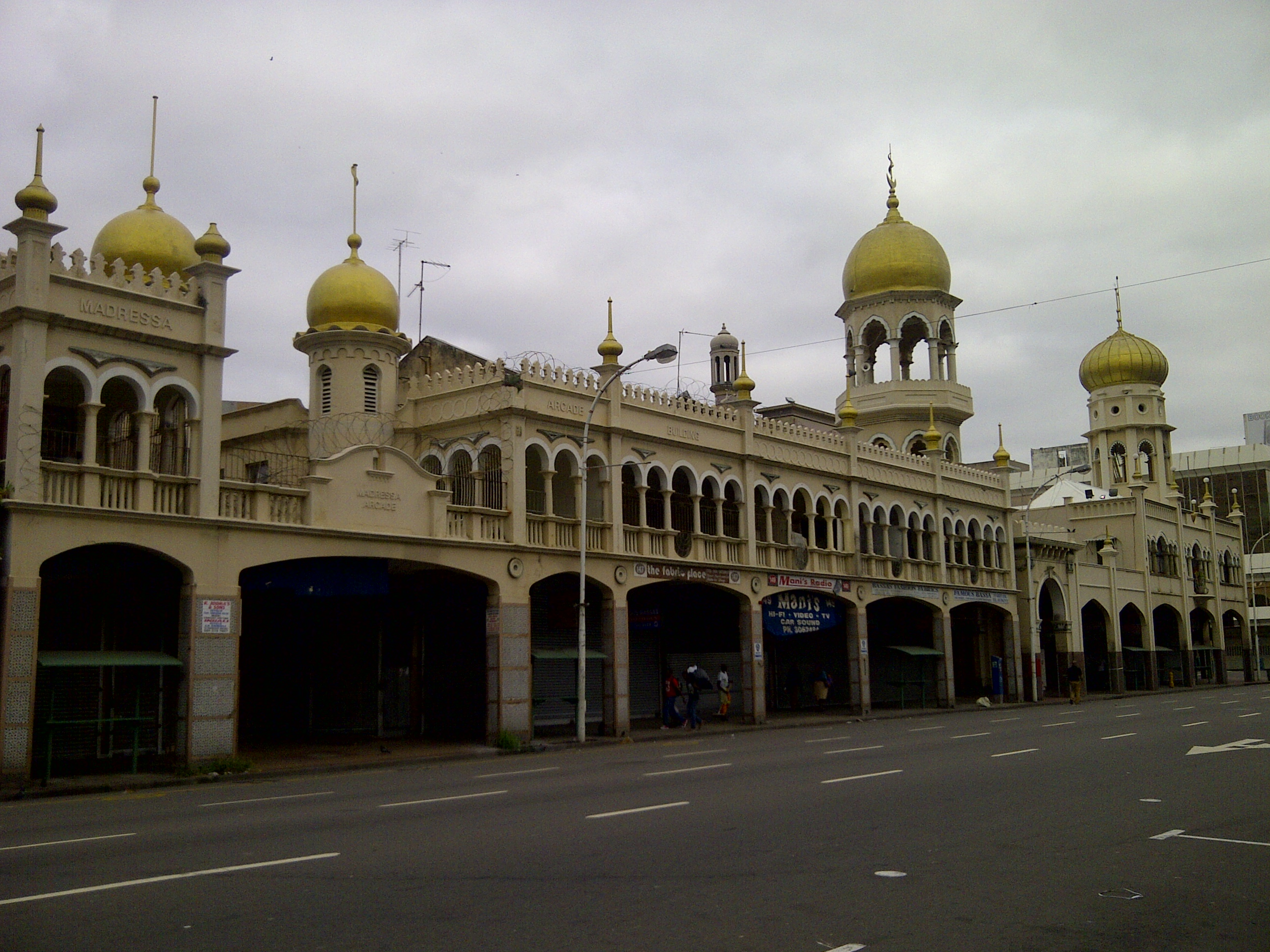
Juma Masjid Mosque on Dr. Yusuf Dadoo Street in 2014

== See also ==
- Islam in South Africa
- Islamic art
- List of mosques in South Africa
