= Palm Tree Mosque =

Second-oldest mosque in South Africa

- Dadelboom Mosque
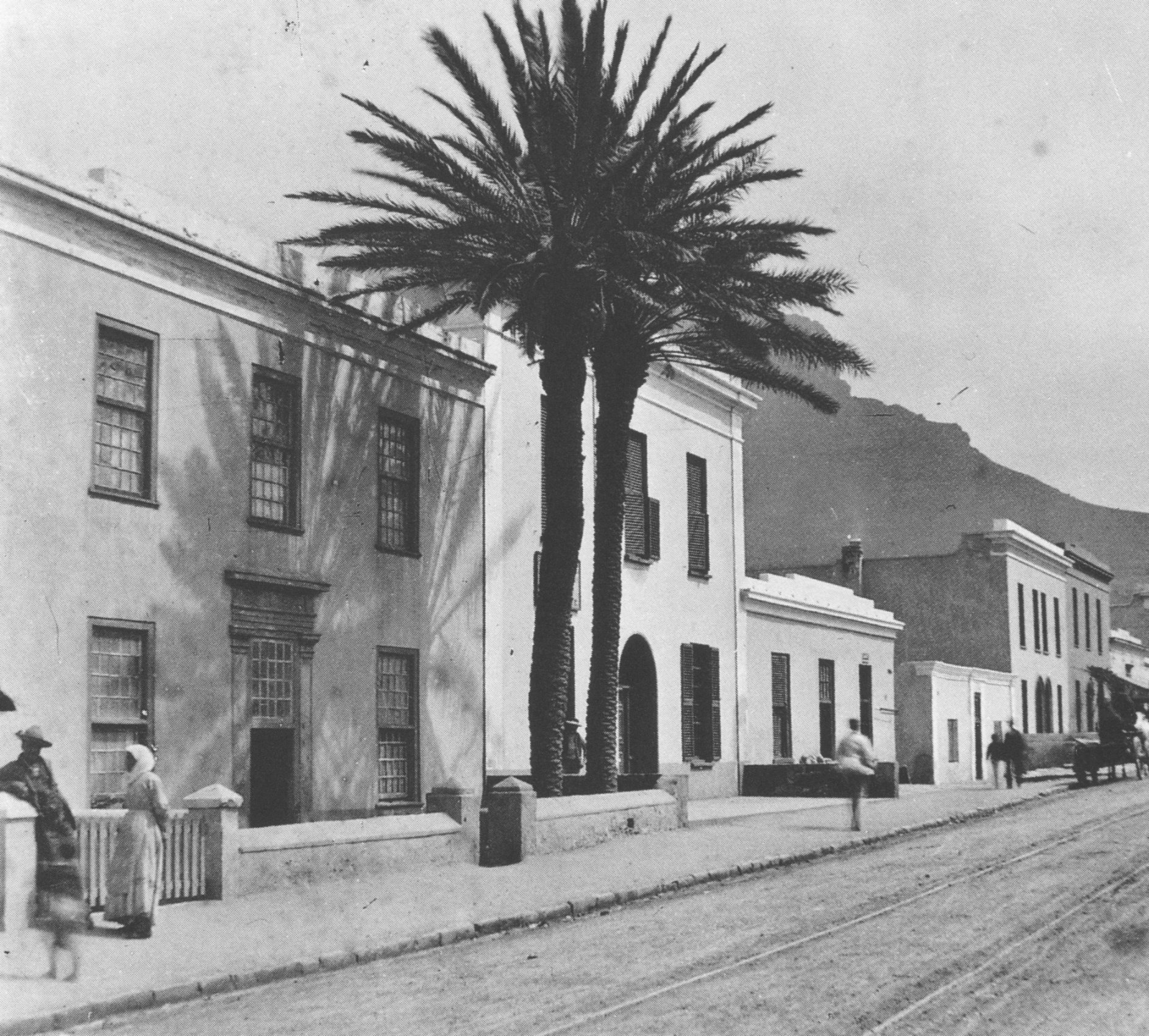
- Palm Tree Mosque, c. 1915

- Location of the mosque in Cape Town

Religion
- Affiliation: Islam
- Ecclesiastical or organizational status: Mosque
- Status: Active

Location
- Location: 185 Long Street, Cape Town, Western Cape
- Country: South Africa
- Interactive map of Palm Tree Mosque
- Coordinates: 33°55′29″S 18°25′00″E

Architecture
- Type: House
- Established: 1807 (as a community)
- Completed: 1788 (as a house); 1807 (as a mosque)

The Palm Tree Mosque, or the Church of Jan van Bougies, or the Dadelboom Mosque (Afrikaans: Dadelboom Mosque), is a former residence and current mosque in Long Street, Cape Town, South Africa. It is the oldest substantially unaltered building in Long Street.

== History ==
The building stands on land once owned by Hermanus Smuts, south-west of a block of land granted to him in 1751. The grant was bounded by Long, Leeuwen and Keerom Streets. After his wife died in 1754, portions of the property were sold off. At the time the property had stables on it. It was purchased by one J. M. Vogel and again, after Vogel's death in 1777, by Baron Willem Ferdinand van Reede van Oudtshoorn. In 1782 it was transferred to one of his sons. Successive owners were Daniel Hugo (1785), Daniel Krynauw (1786) and Carel Lodewijk Schot (1787).

Schot went bankrupt, but is probably responsible for building the first residence in about 1788. The property was bought by J. P. Roux in 1790. Freed slaves Jan van Bougies and Frans van Bengalen bought the property in 1807 and Jan van Bougies became the sole owner in 1811. Jan and Frans, along with some followers, broke away from the Auwal Mosque, when the former failed to succeed as imam. When Jan van Bougies died in 1846, aged 112, he left the property to his wife Samida of the Cape, but specified that it continue to operate as a mosque, the second-oldest in Cape Town.

The second storey was presumable added after the house had been turned into a mosque some time between 1811 and 1821. There was once a garden in front of the house, in which two palm trees grew. Today there is one of the remaining trees, with a new tree planted on the 8 November 1965, to replace the one that was blown over by a strong wind. The low sash window and shortened door are not by design; Long Street was raised over the years.

== Gallery ==
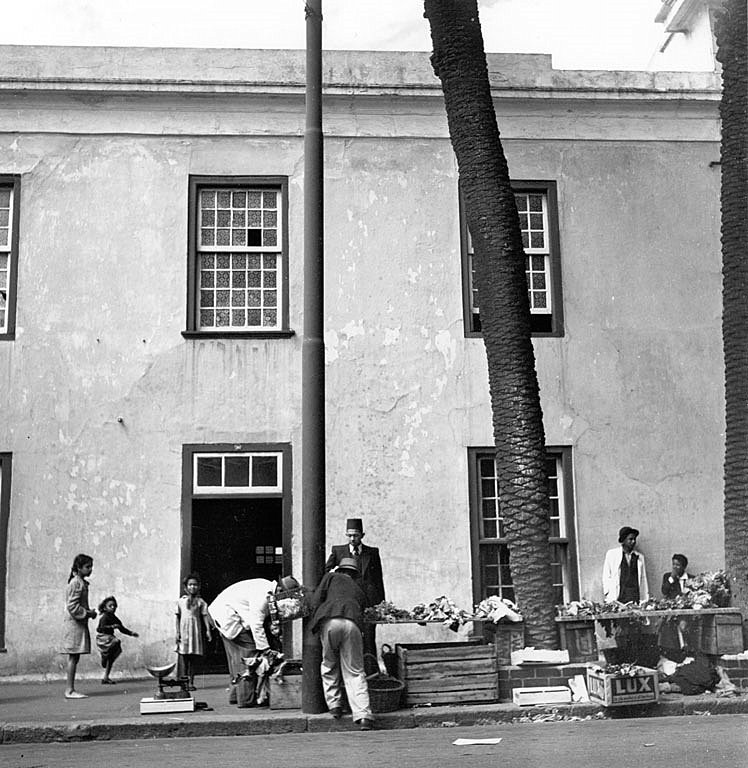
Palm Tree Mosque in 1943

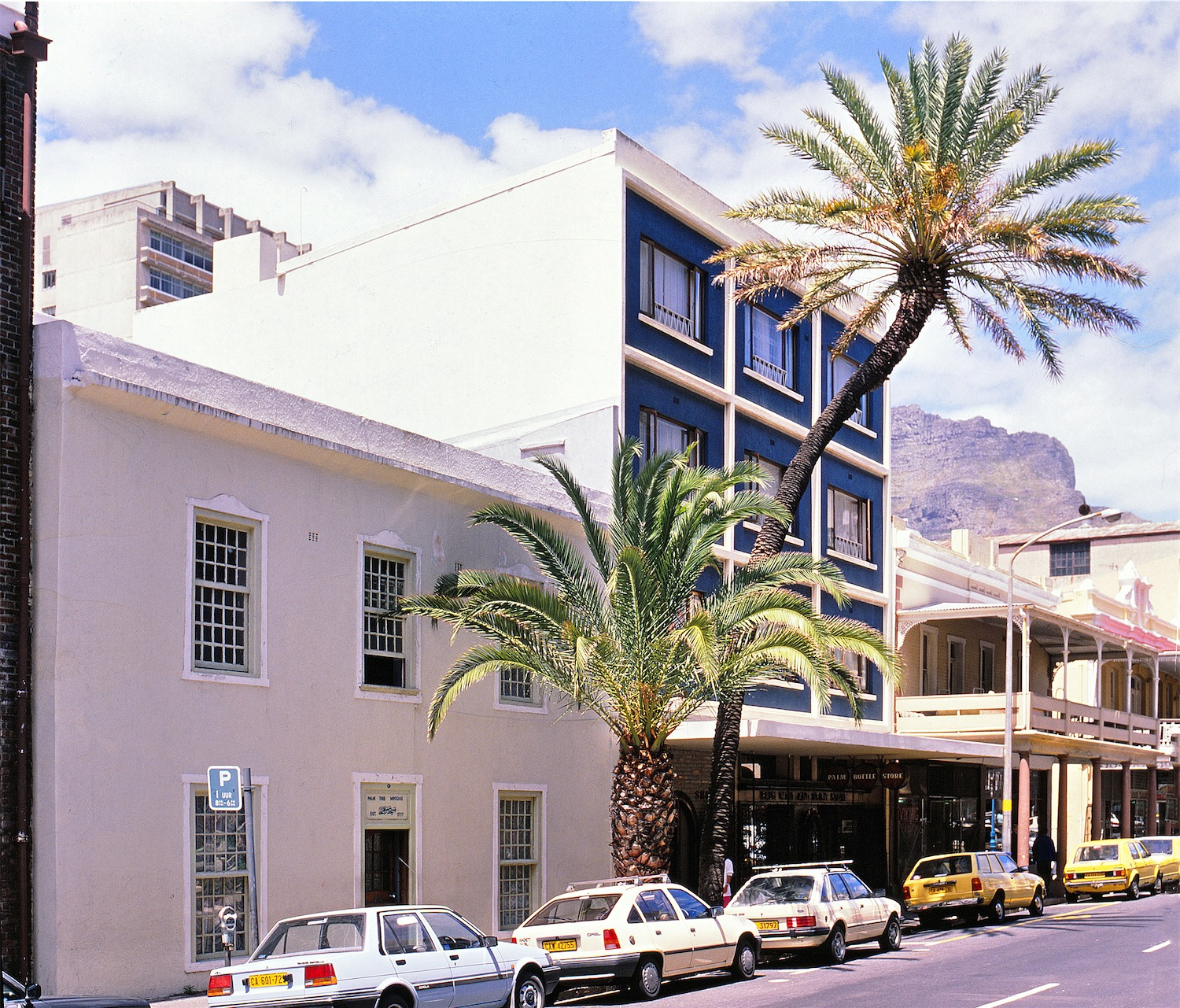
Palm Tree Mosque in 1988

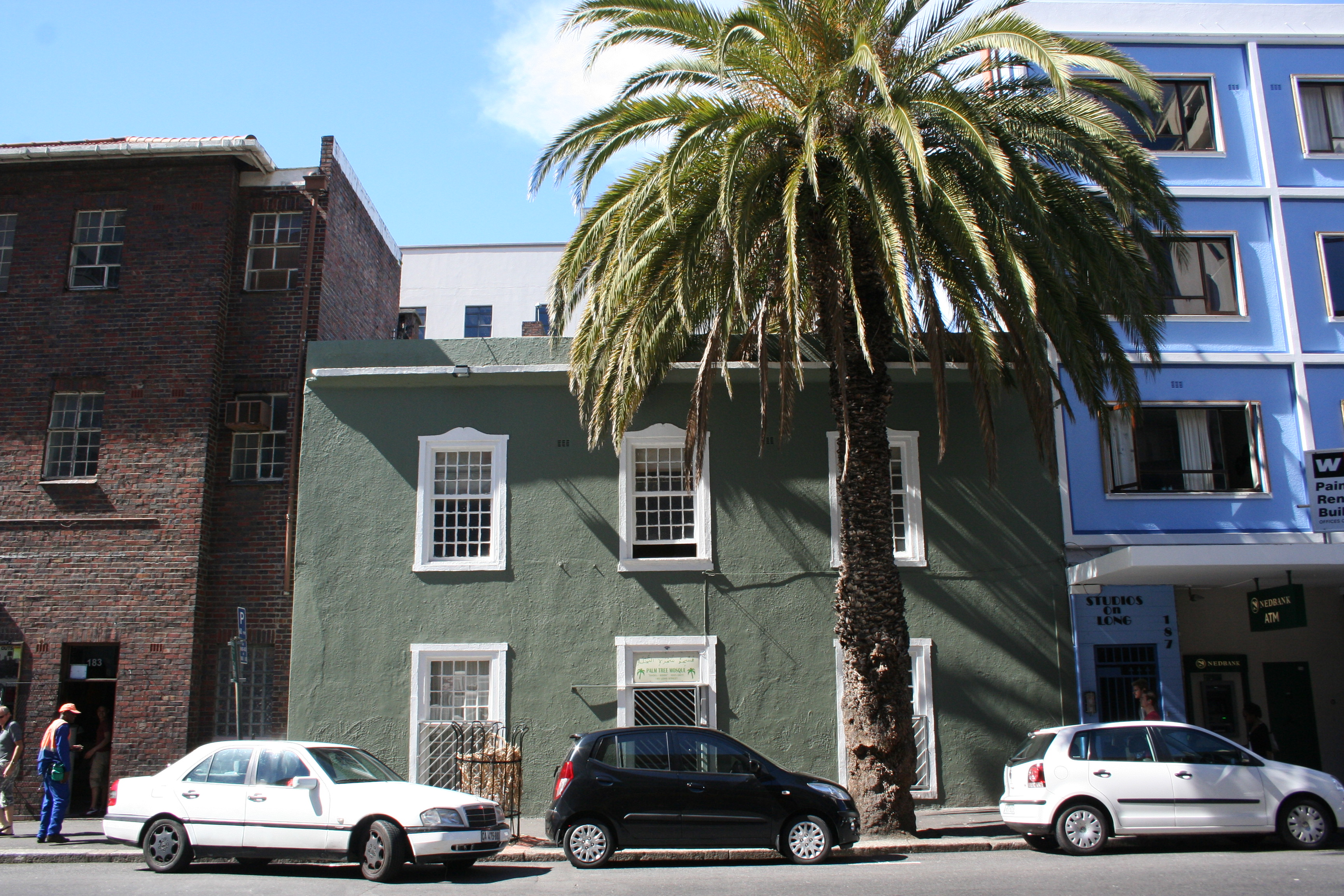
Palm Tree Mosque in 2012

== See also ==
- Islam in South Africa
- List of mosques in South Africa
