= Bo-Kaap =

Residential area of Cape Town on the slopes of Signal Hill

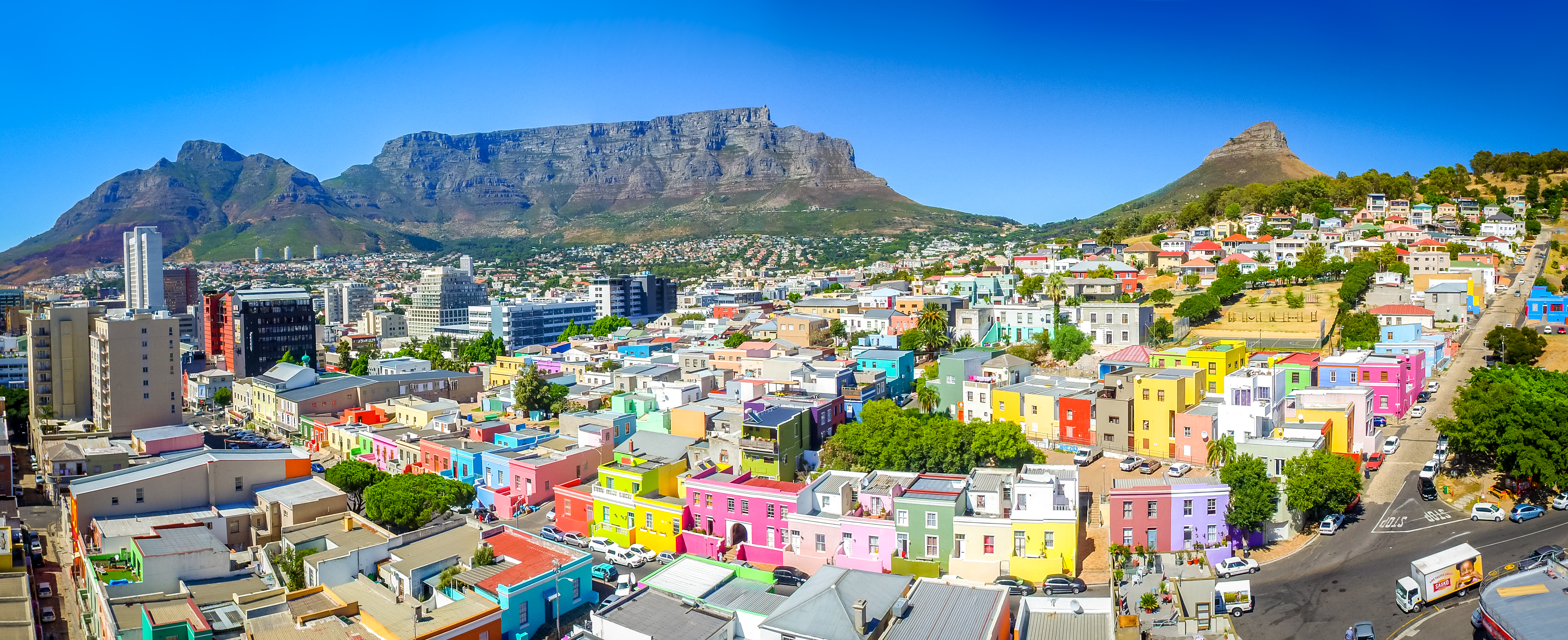
- Bo-Kaap area of Cape Town, with its distinctive pastel colored houses in the foreground, the CBD to the left and Table Mountain in the background
- Interactive map of Bo-Kaap
- Coordinates: 33°55′15″S 18°24′55″E
- Country: South Africa
- Province: Western Cape
- Municipality: City of Cape Town
- Established: 1760

Area
  - Total: 0.95 km^{2} (0.37 sq mi)

Population (2011)
  - Total: 3,203
  - Density: 3,400/km^{2} (8,700/sq mi)

Racial makeup (2011)
  - Coloured: 66.0%
  - Black African: 9.0%
  - White: 4.3%
  - Indian/Asian: 3.4%
  - Other: 17.3%

First languages (2011)
  - English: 64.0%
  - Afrikaans: 30.3%
  - Other: 5.7%
- Time zone: UTC+2 (SAST)
- Postal code (street): 8001
- Area code: +27 (0)21

The Bo-Kaap (lit. "above the Cape" in Afrikaans) is an area of Cape Town, South Africa, formerly known as the Malay Quarter. It is a former racially segregated area, situated on the slopes of Signal Hill above the city centre, and is a historical centre of Cape Malay culture in Cape Town. The Nurul Islam Mosque, established in 1844, is located in the area.

Bo-Kaap is known for its brightly coloured homes and cobblestoned streets. The area is traditionally a multicultural neighbourhood, and 56.9% of its population identify as Muslim. According to the South African Heritage Resources Agency, the area contains the largest concentration of pre-1850 architecture in South Africa, and is the oldest surviving residential neighborhood in Cape Town.

== History ==
In 1760 Jan de Waal bought a block of land at the foot of Signal Hill, between Dorp and Wale Streets. A year later he obtained an adjacent parcel, extending his holding to Rose/Chiappini/Shortmarket Street. Starting in 1763, de Waal built several small “huurhuisjes” (rental houses) on this land, which he leased to his slaves. The first three are at 71 Wale Street (now the Bokaap Museum), above Buitengracht Street, and 42 Leeuwen Street respectively.

Skilled Muslim labourers called Mardijkers moved to the Cape from Southeast Asia and lived in the Bo-Kaap. Because the aboriginal tribes in the Cape Colony area resisted the Dutch, slaves were initially imported from Malaysia, Indonesia and different parts of Africa, hence the name “Malay”. Most of the new residents were Muslim, and several mosques were built in the area. The first one was Auwal Mosque, in Dorp Street in 1794. Between 1790 and 1825 more housing in both the Cape Dutch and Cape Georgian styles was built for the expanding population of tradesmen, craftsmen, and artisans. In 1804 the Tana Baru Cemetery was established to serve the Muslim families.

More Muslims continued to move into the area, including a wave of political exiles from Java and Ceylon circa 1820. After the emancipation in 1834 and the arrival of liberated slaves, developers constructed numerous rows of narrow, deep huurhuisjes.

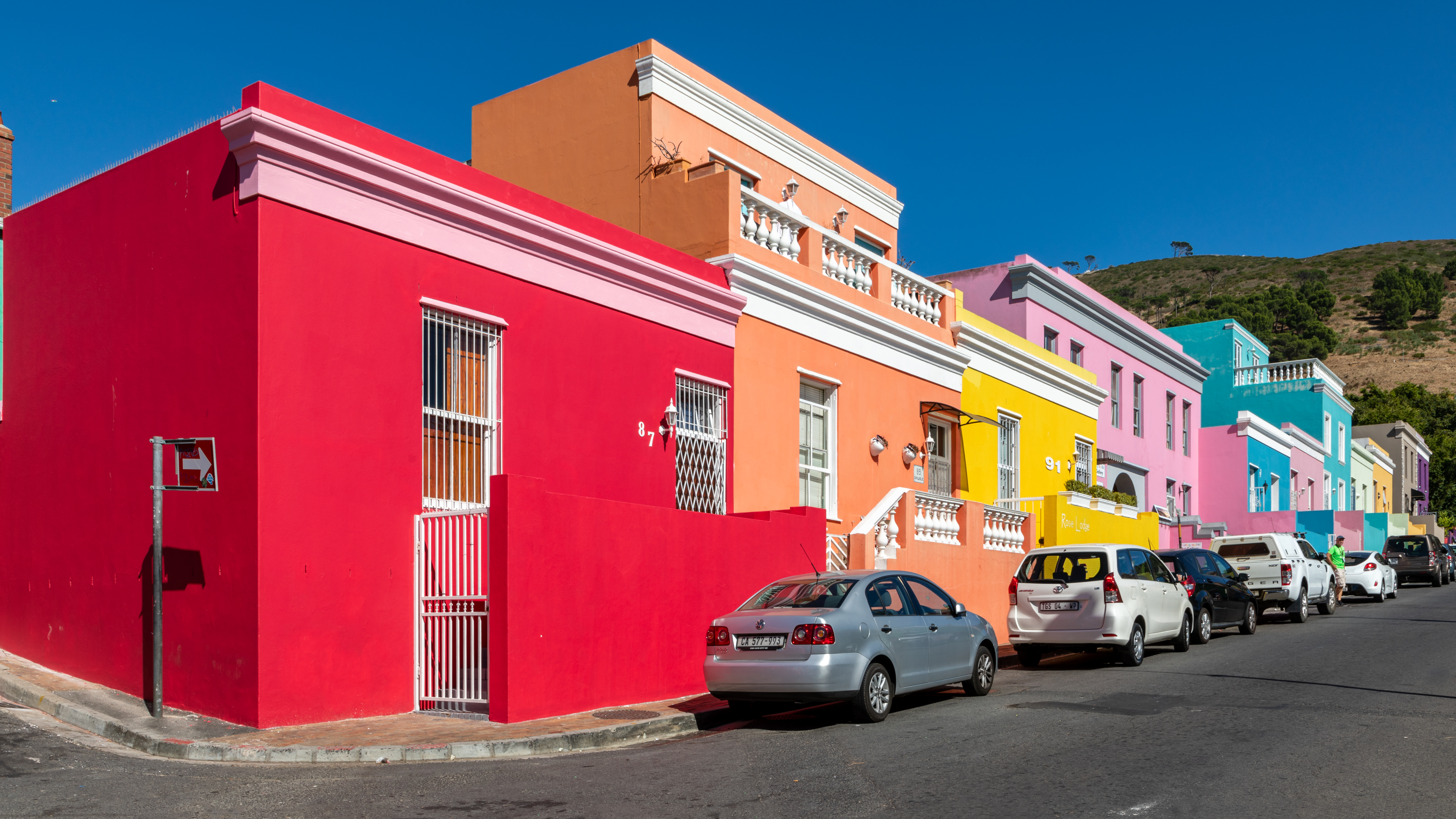
Wale Street, Bo Kaap

The brightly coloured facades are attributed to an expression of freedom by the new homeowners, as all the houses were painted white while on lease, although it appears that the tradition of brightly coloured homes began in the late 20th century, rather than earlier.

Although the area has always been a centre of Cape Malay culture, until the implementation of the Group Areas Act under apartheid, it also had residents of other ethnicities. These included Indians, non-Muslim Coloureds, Filipinos, Africans, Portuguese and Italians at different times. Historically, the Bo-Kaap was larger than its current extent.

Under apartheid, the area was not bulldozed, unlike nearby District Six, however non-Malay residents were forcibly removed in accordance with the Group Areas Act, in an effort by a sympathetic National Party-led government official (I. D. du Plessis) to preserve the Malay character of the area.

Preservation of the area began in 1943 when 15 houses were restored by a group of prominent citizens, with the support of the Historical Monuments Commission. In 1966 a portion of the area was designated as a National Monument. From 1971 the City Council began restoring houses and streetscapes, with 48 units completed by 1975.

While Bo-Kaap has been praised as a ‘picturesque district’ for its brightly coloured homes in shades of pink, red, blue, green, and purple, tensions over over-tourism, gentrification, and traditionalist and progressive voices have been in active discussion amongst community members. The neighborhood is also known for its support of the cause of Palestinian liberation, including through large murals of the Palestinian flag. This support stems in part from the neighborhood's Muslim heritage, but has also caused controversy locally and abroad.

=== Gentrification ===
As a result of Cape Town's economic development and expansion, and after the demise of forced racial segregation under apartheid, property in the Bo-Kaap has become very sought after, not only for its location but also for its picturesque cobble-streets and unique architecture. Increasingly, this close-knit community is "facing a slow dissolution of its distinctive character as wealthy outsiders move into the suburb to snap up homes in the City Bowl at cut-rate prices". Inter-community conflict has also arisen as some residents object to the sale of buildings and the resultant eviction of long-term residents.

=== National Heritage status ===
In May 2019, 19 sites in the Bo-Kaap area were declared National Heritage sites by the South African Minister of Arts and Culture. The announcement followed the City of Cape Town council's March 2019 approving of the inclusion of the Bo-Kaap area in a Heritage Protection Overlay Zone (HPOZ), which will incorporate around 600 privately owned homes. The city received over 2,000 letters from members of the public, a strong majority of which were in support of the new Heritage Zone. The HPOZ stretches to the Table Mountain National Park, and includes the northern verges to the northwest of Strand Street as well as Buitengracht Street, between the intersections with Carisbrook Street and Strand Street.

The 19 sites became official National Heritage sites through a declaration by the South African Heritage Resources Agency, under the National Heritage Resources Act (No 25 of 1999). Objectives of the Heritage Zone include conserving the Bo-Kaap heritage by encouraging owners to retain and rehabilitate the existing residential buildings; ensuring new developments in the area complement existing landscape; and promoting social and cultural traditions in the area.

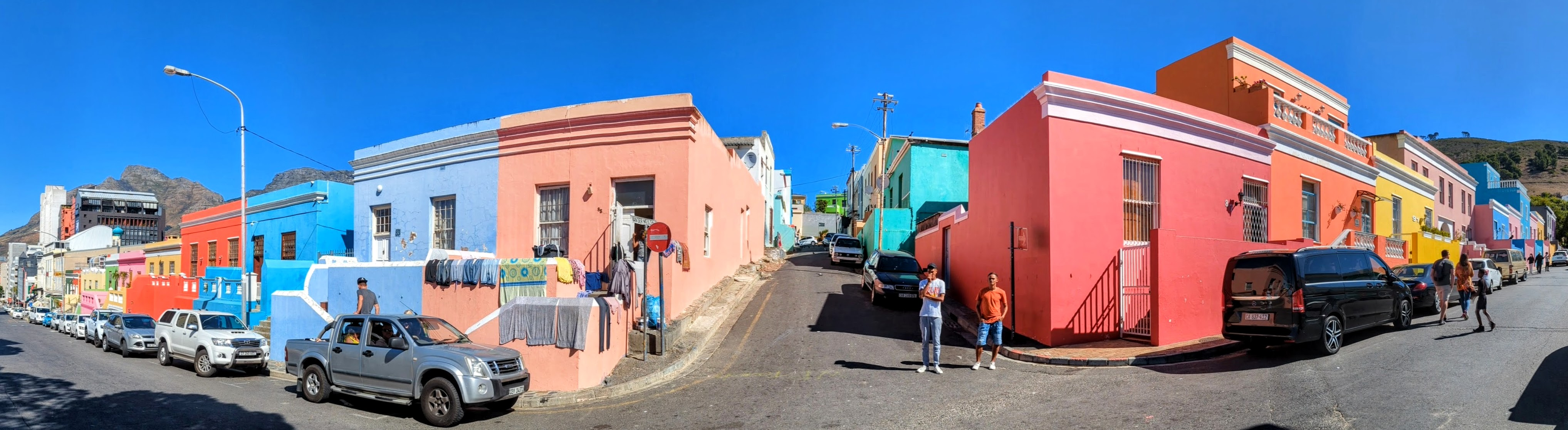
Colourful buildings line Wale Street at Rose Street

== Bo-Kaap Museum ==
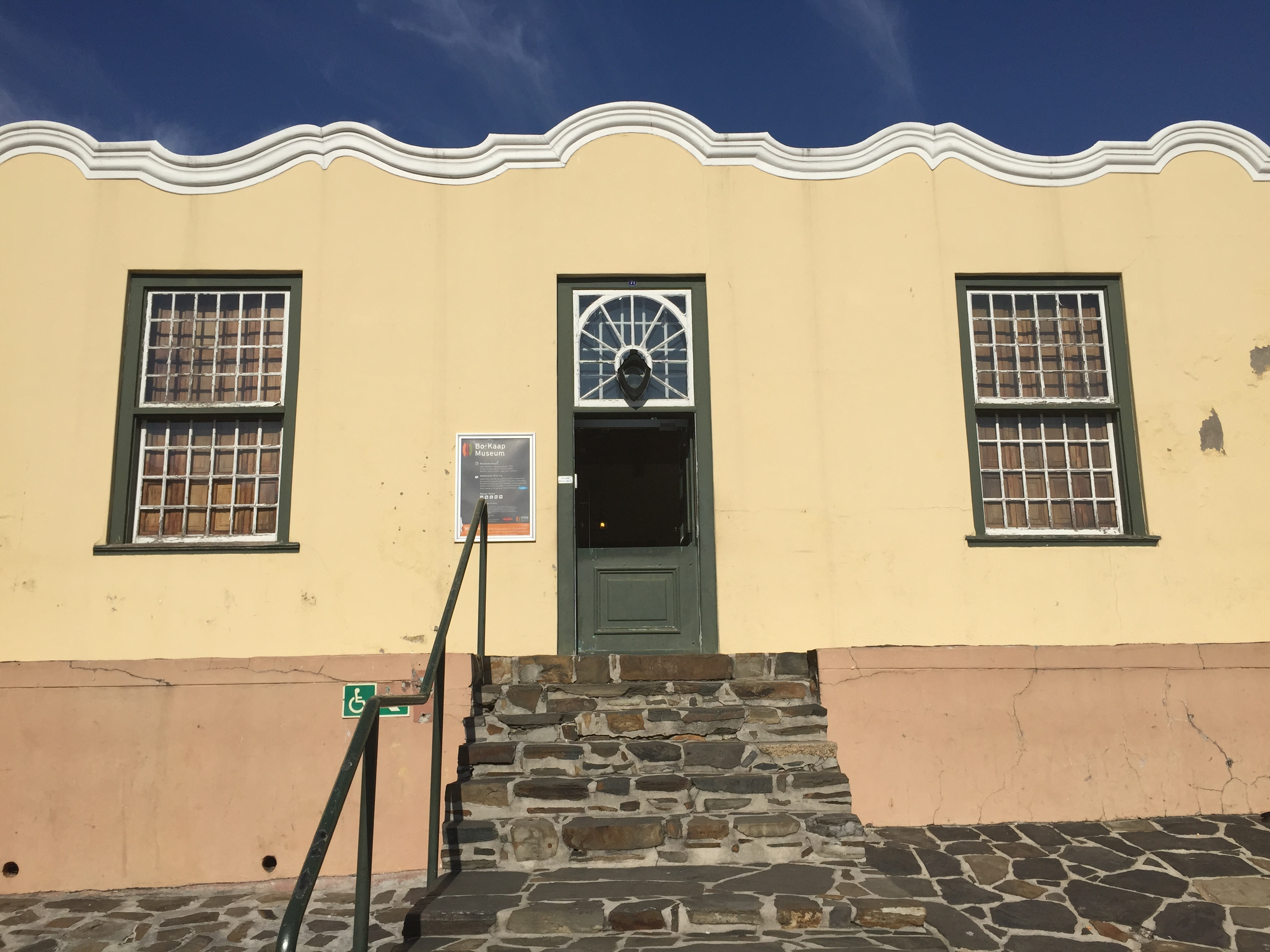
Entrance to the Bo-Kaap Museum

The museum, whose building dates back to the 1760s, is the oldest house in the area still in its original form. It highlights the cultural contribution made by early Muslim settlers, many of whom were skilled tailors, carpenters, shoe makers and builders. It contains 19th century furnishings which include a fine Cape drop-leaf dining table, Cape Regency-style chairs and a bridal chamber decorated to match the bride's dress.

The museum is distinguishable by its voorstoep, a type of front terrace with a bench at each end emphasizing the polarizing aspect of Cape Muslim culture. The museum exhibits the lifestyle of a prosperous 19th-century Cape Muslim family along with black-and-white photographs of daily life in the area.

== Gallery ==
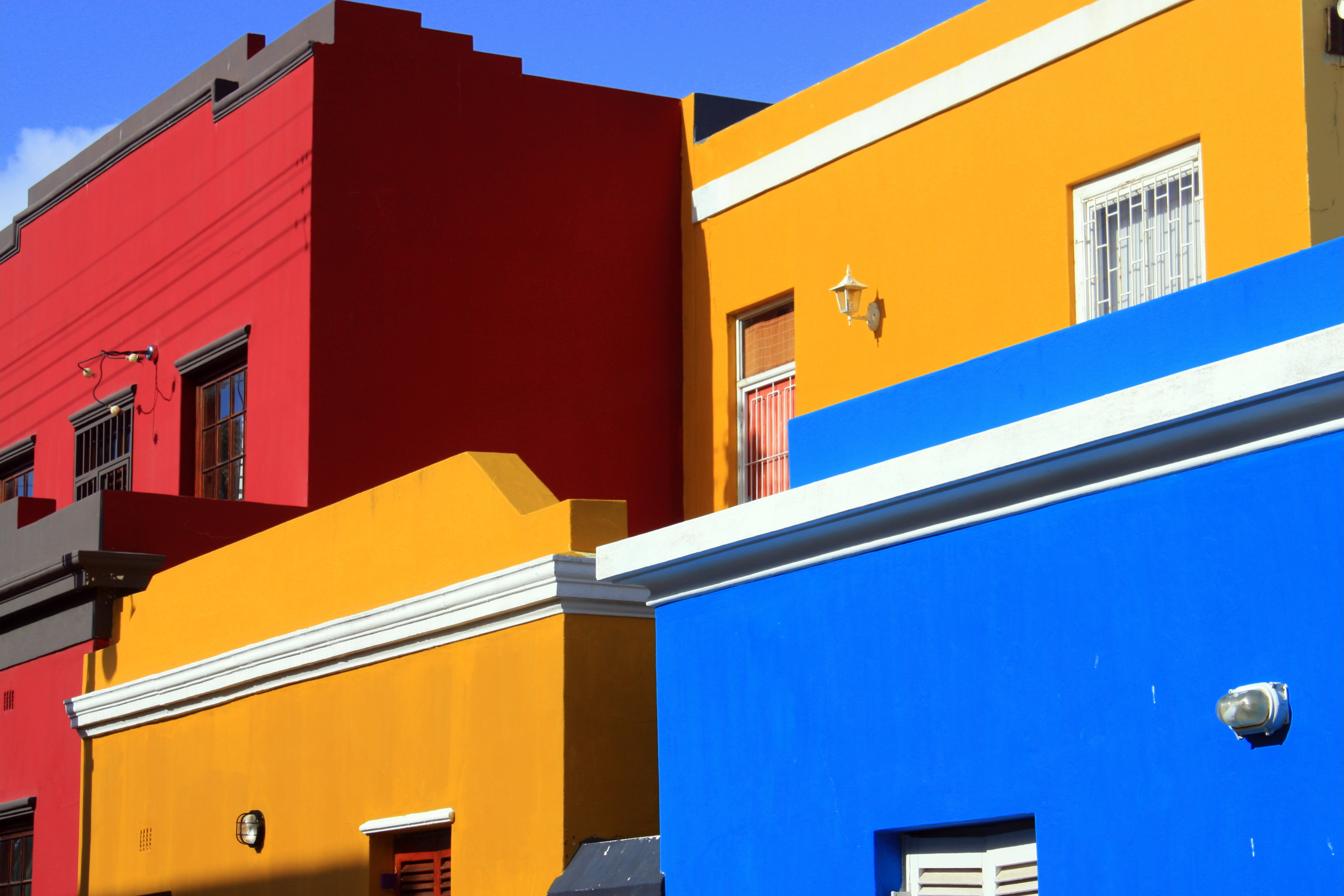
Bo-Kaap primary colours

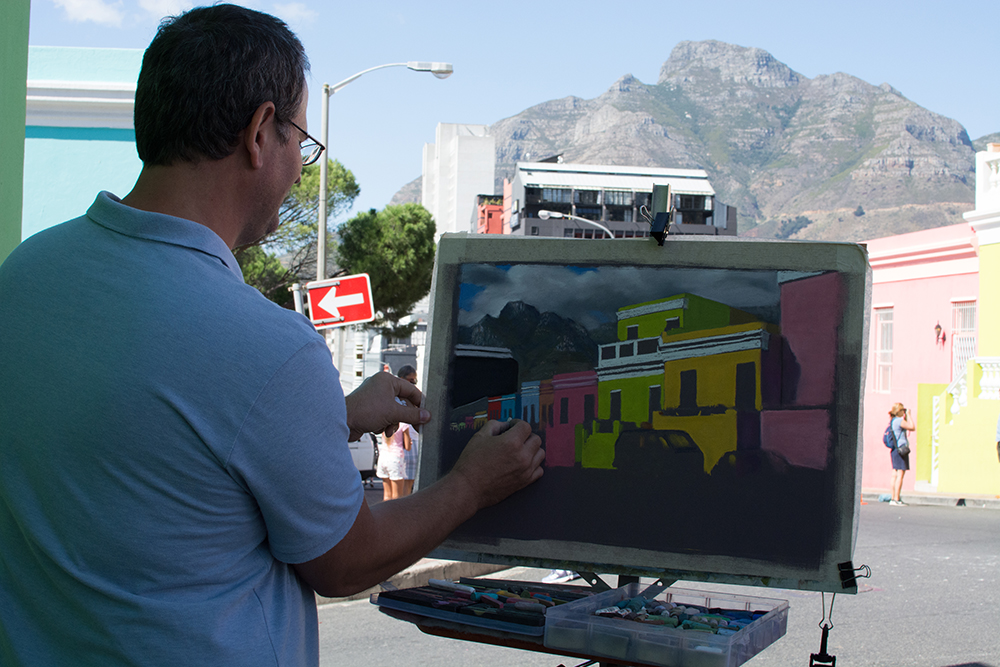
Local artist Christopher Reid, painting in Bo-Kaap.

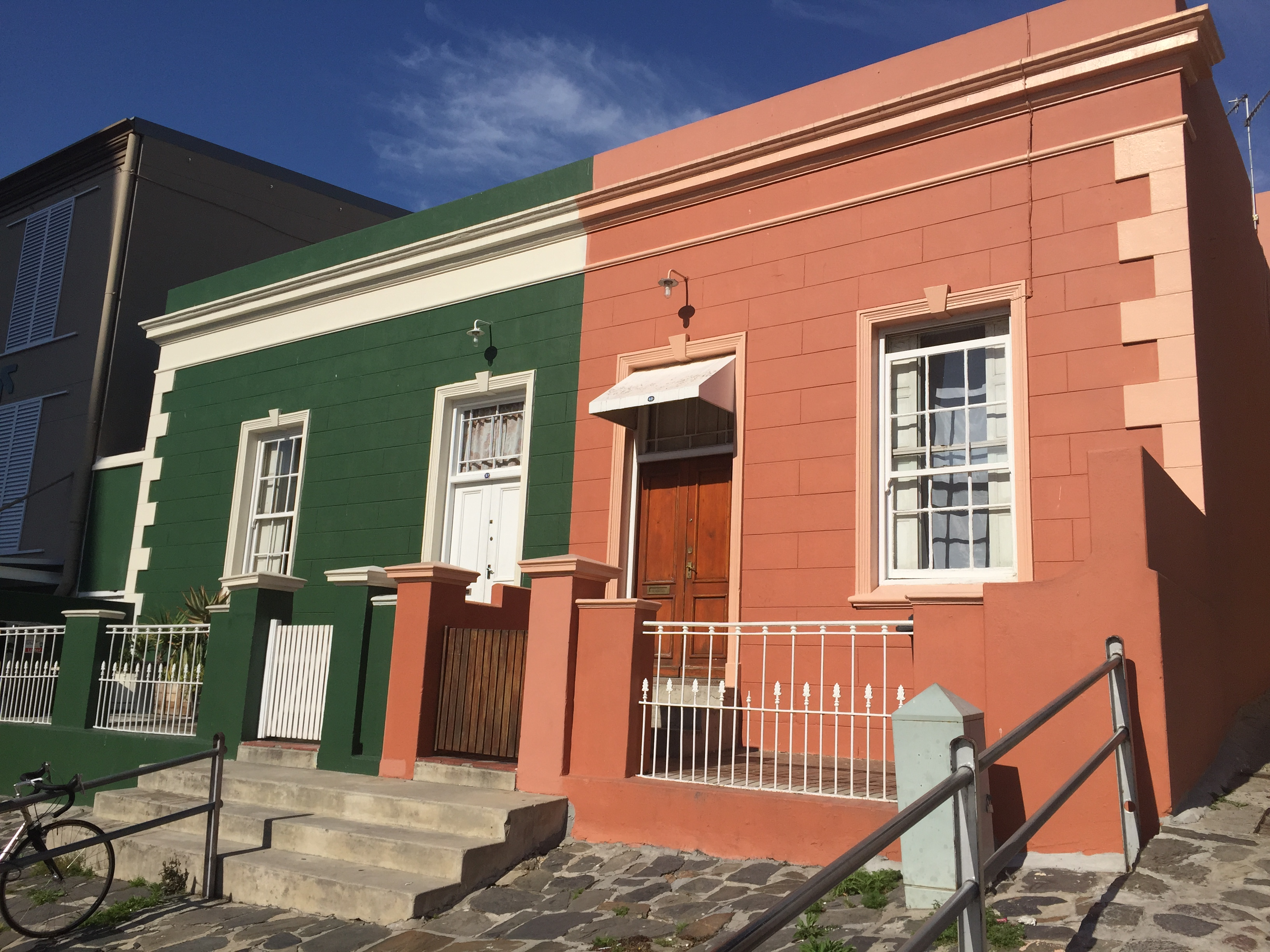
Bo-Kaap British Style houses

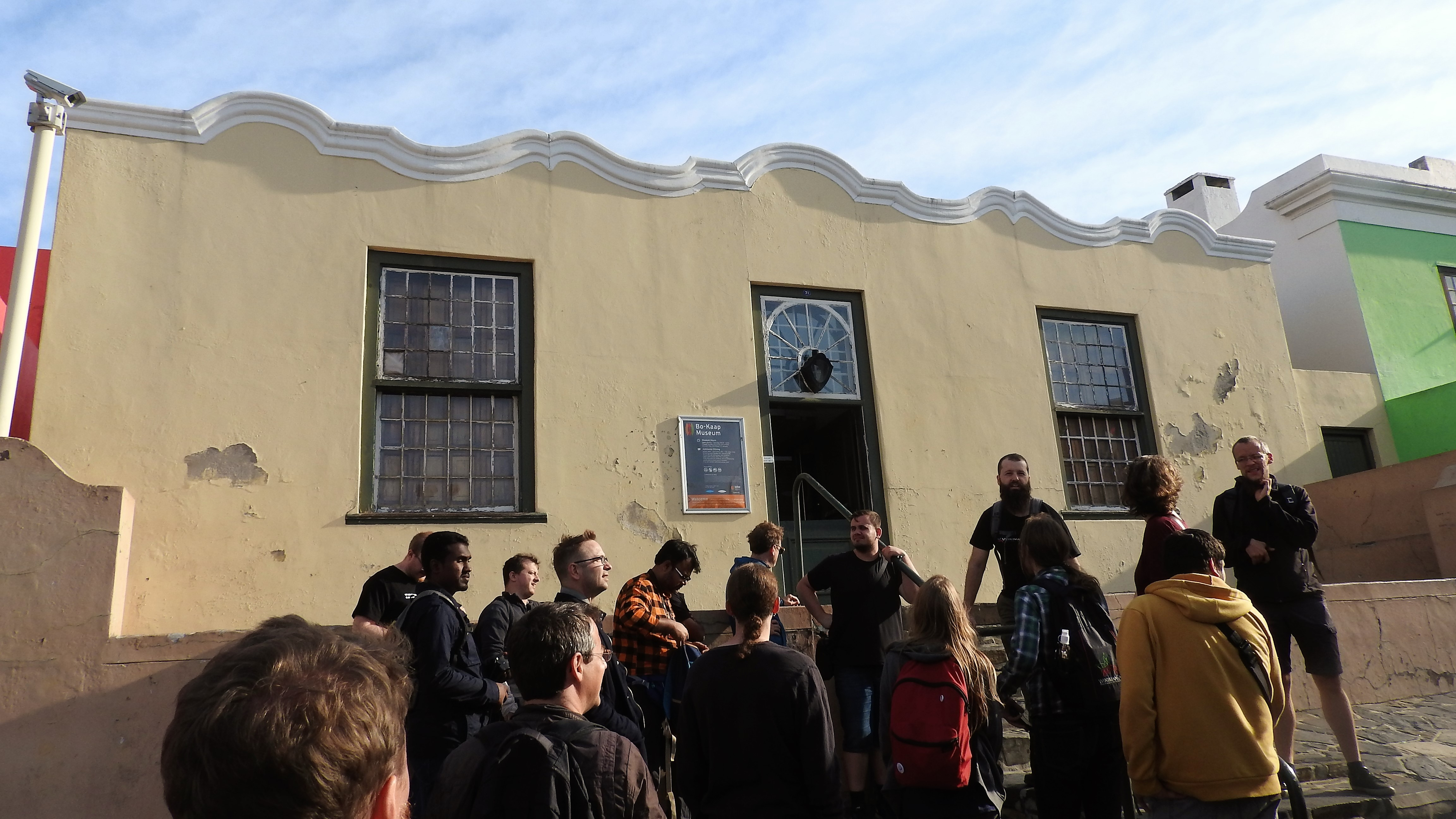
Bo-Kaap Iziko Museum

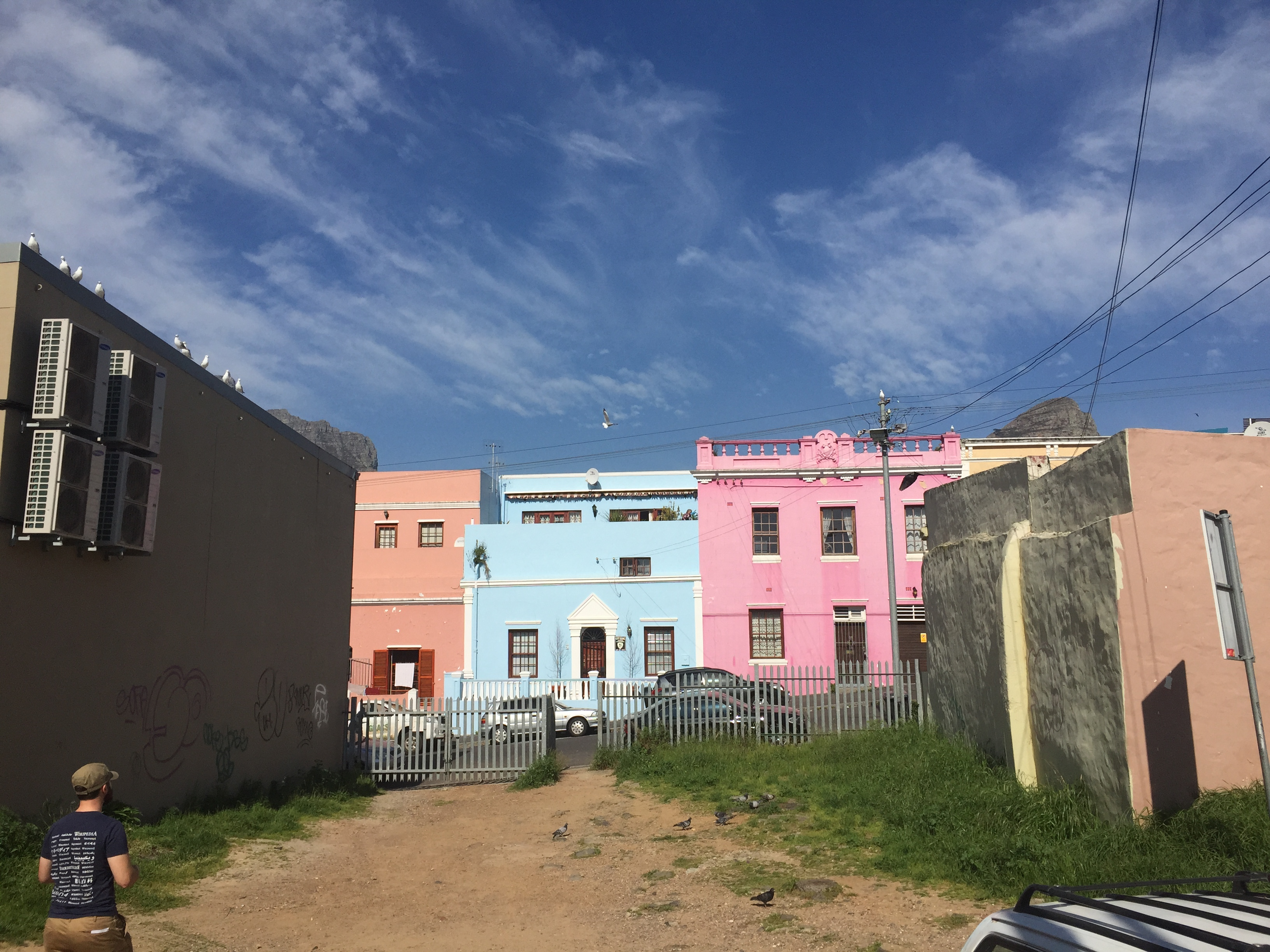
Behind the Iziko Bo-Kaap Museum

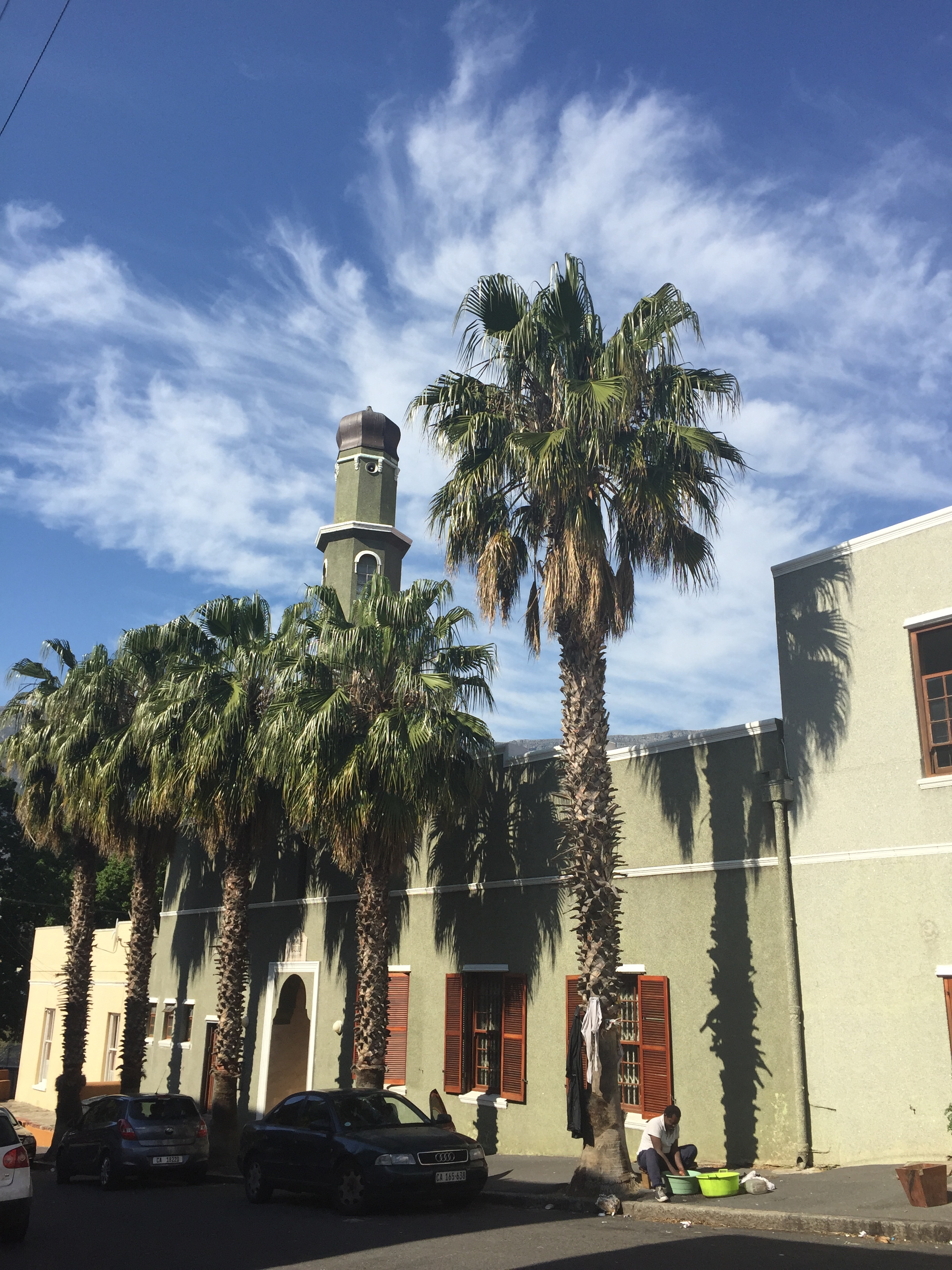
Auwal Mosque: the oldest in South Africa

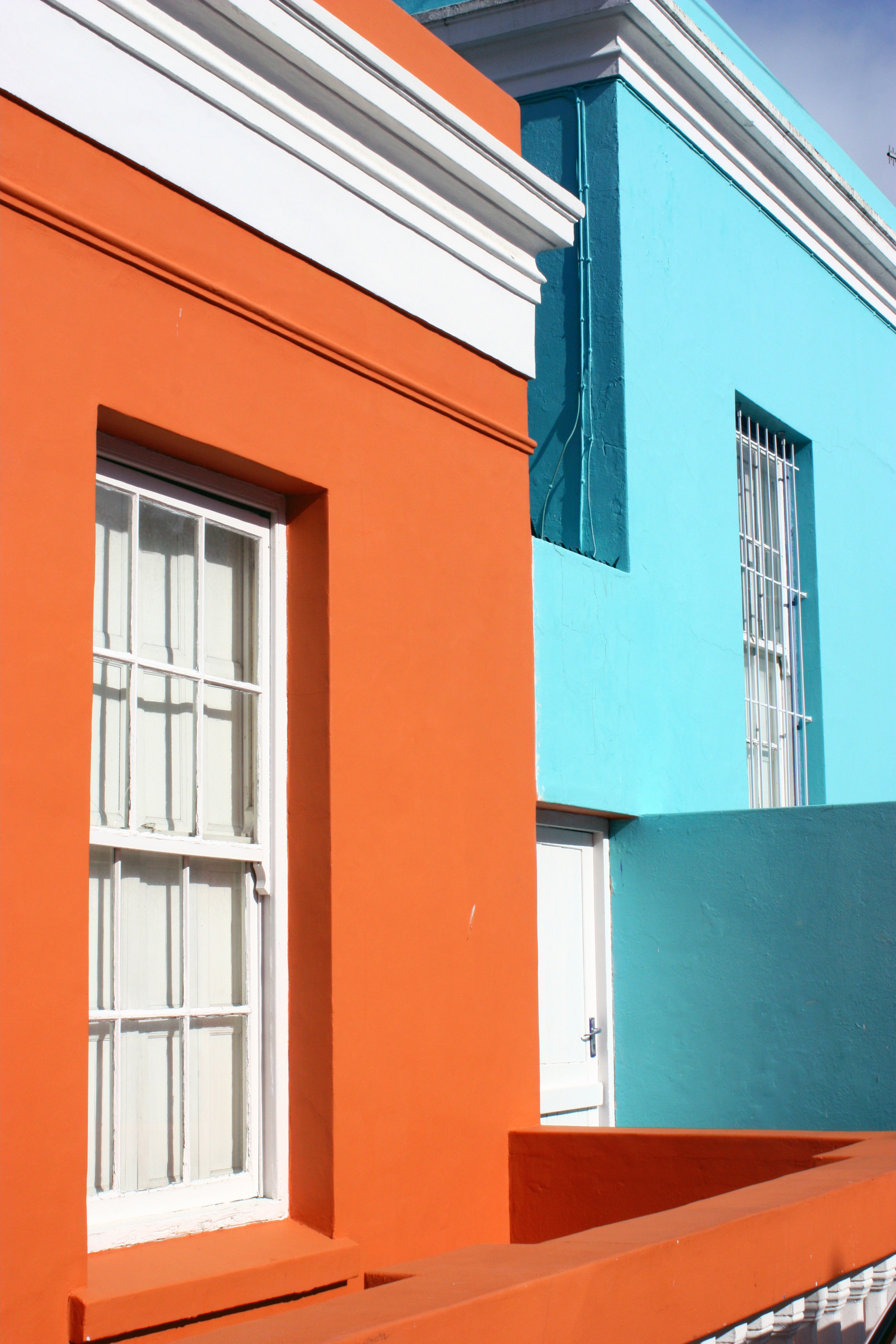
Chiappini Street houses

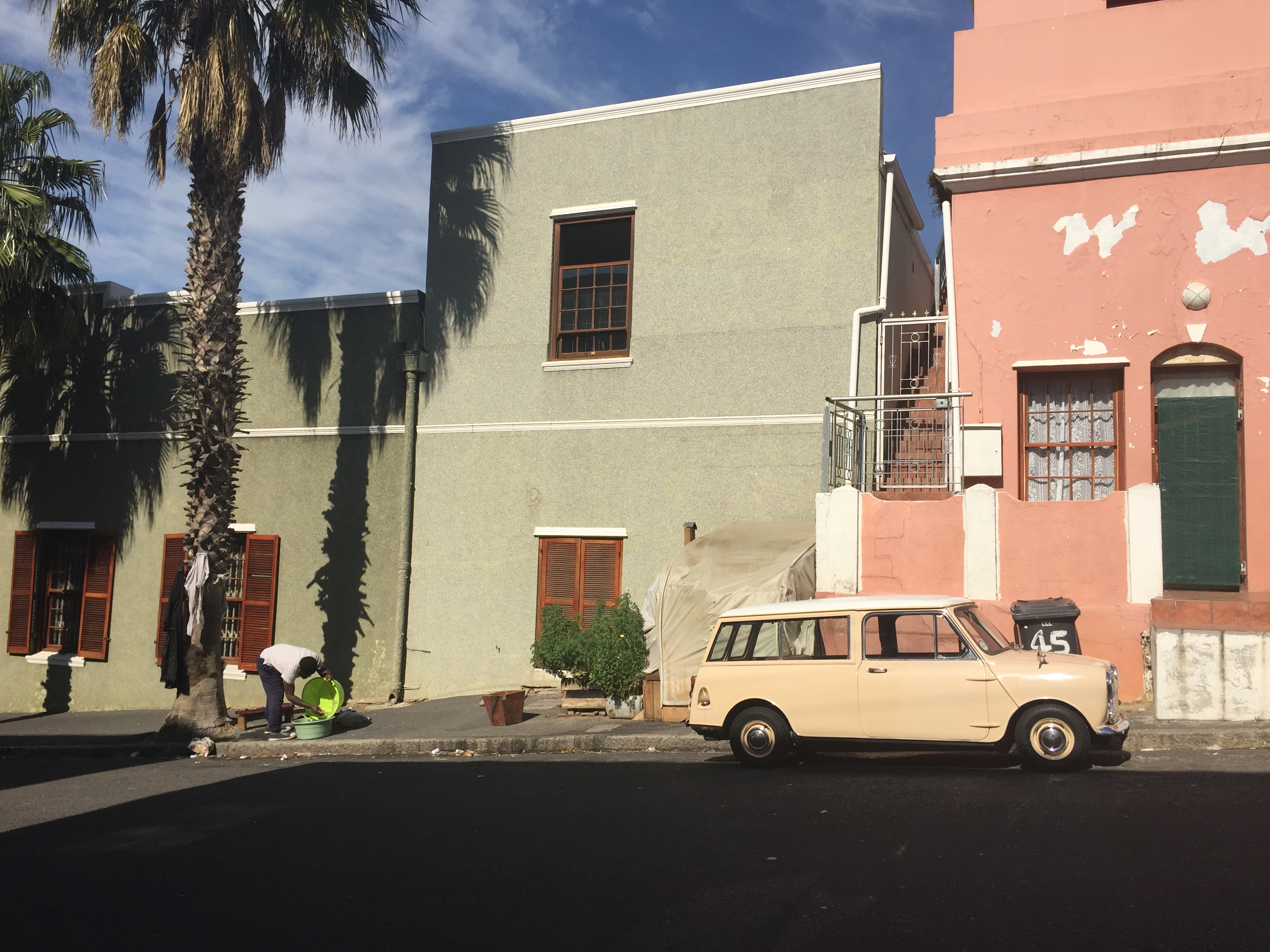
Daily scene in the Bo-Kaap

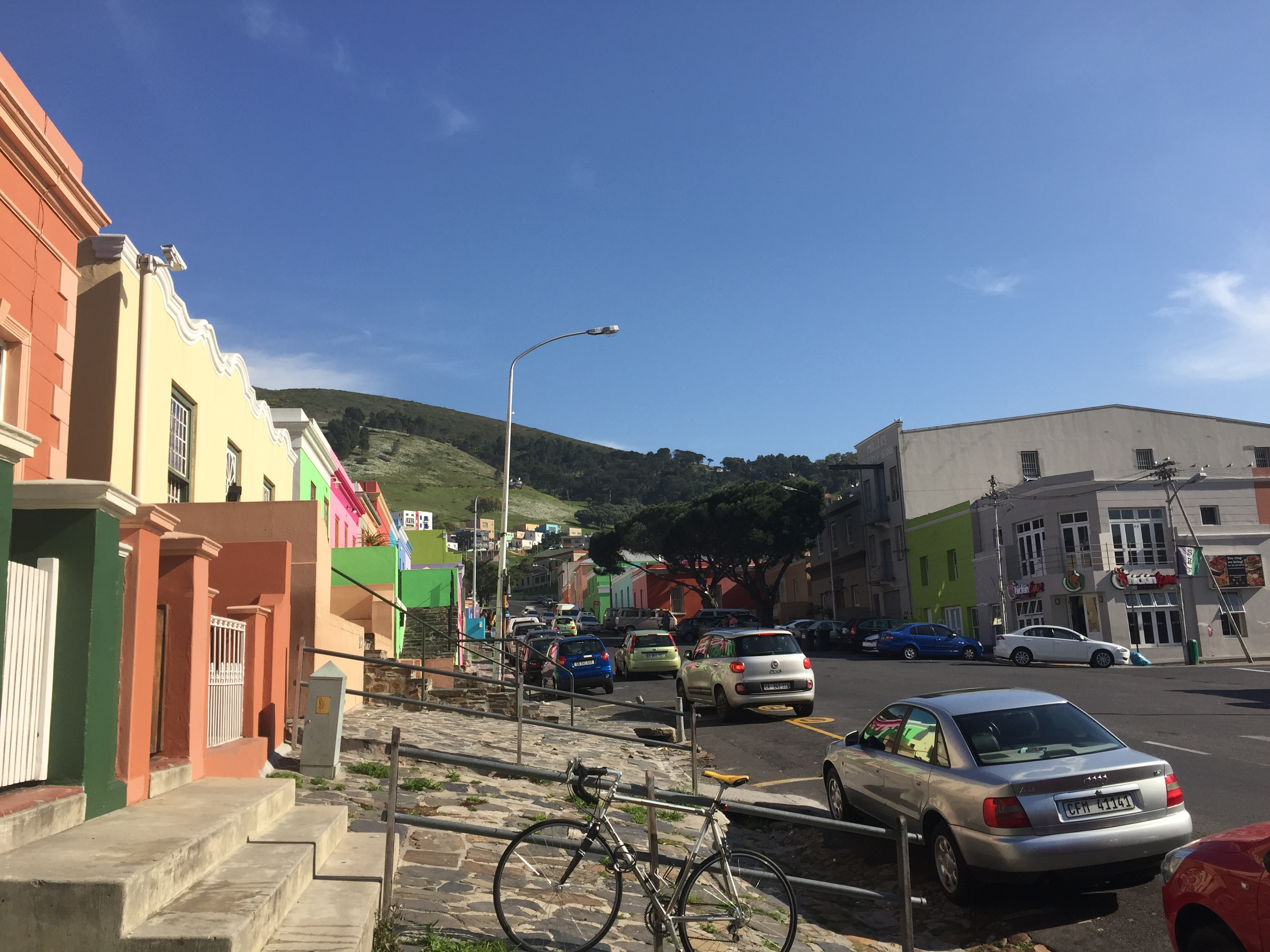
The view of Signal Hill from Bo-Kaap

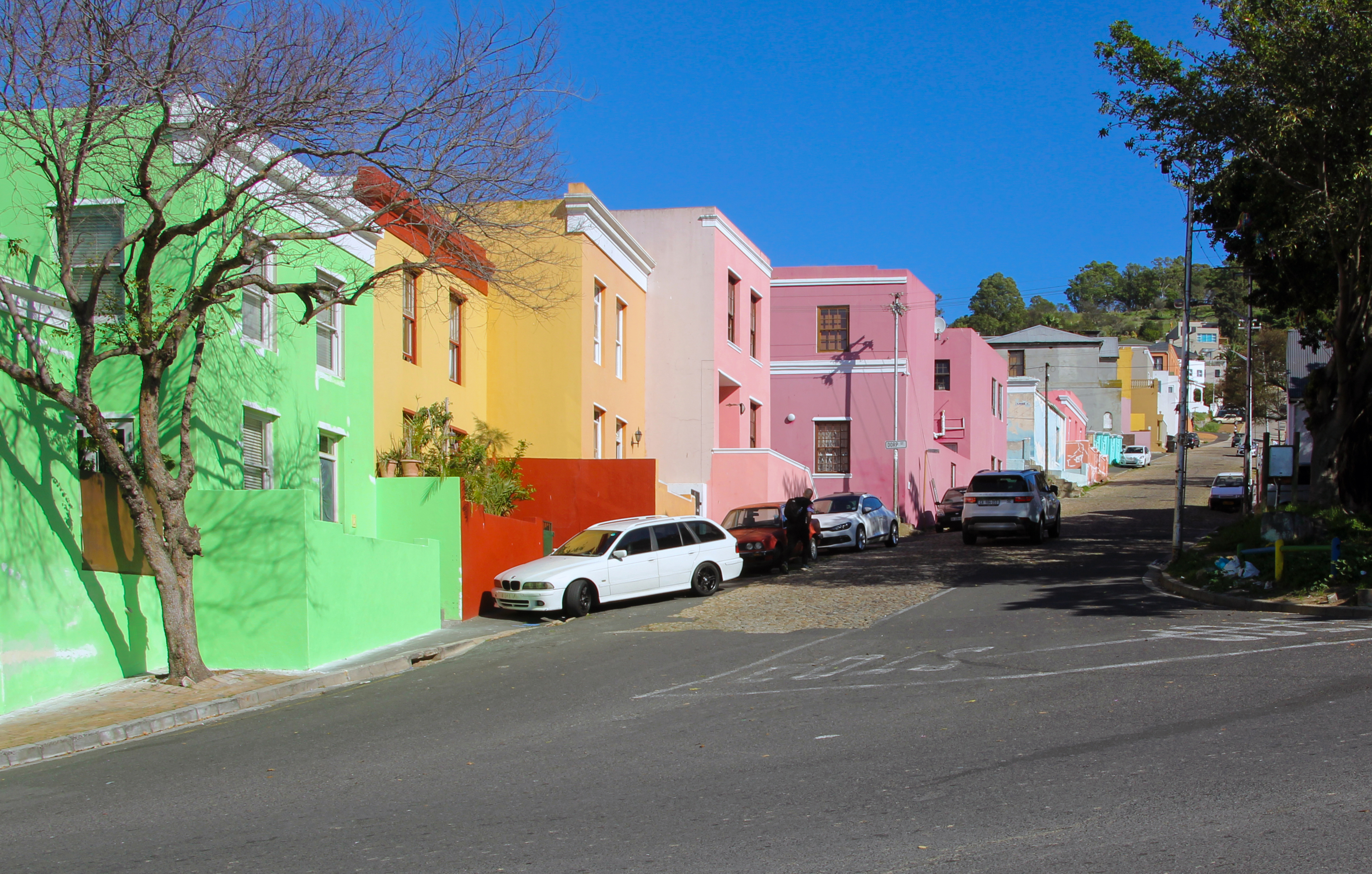
Pentz Street

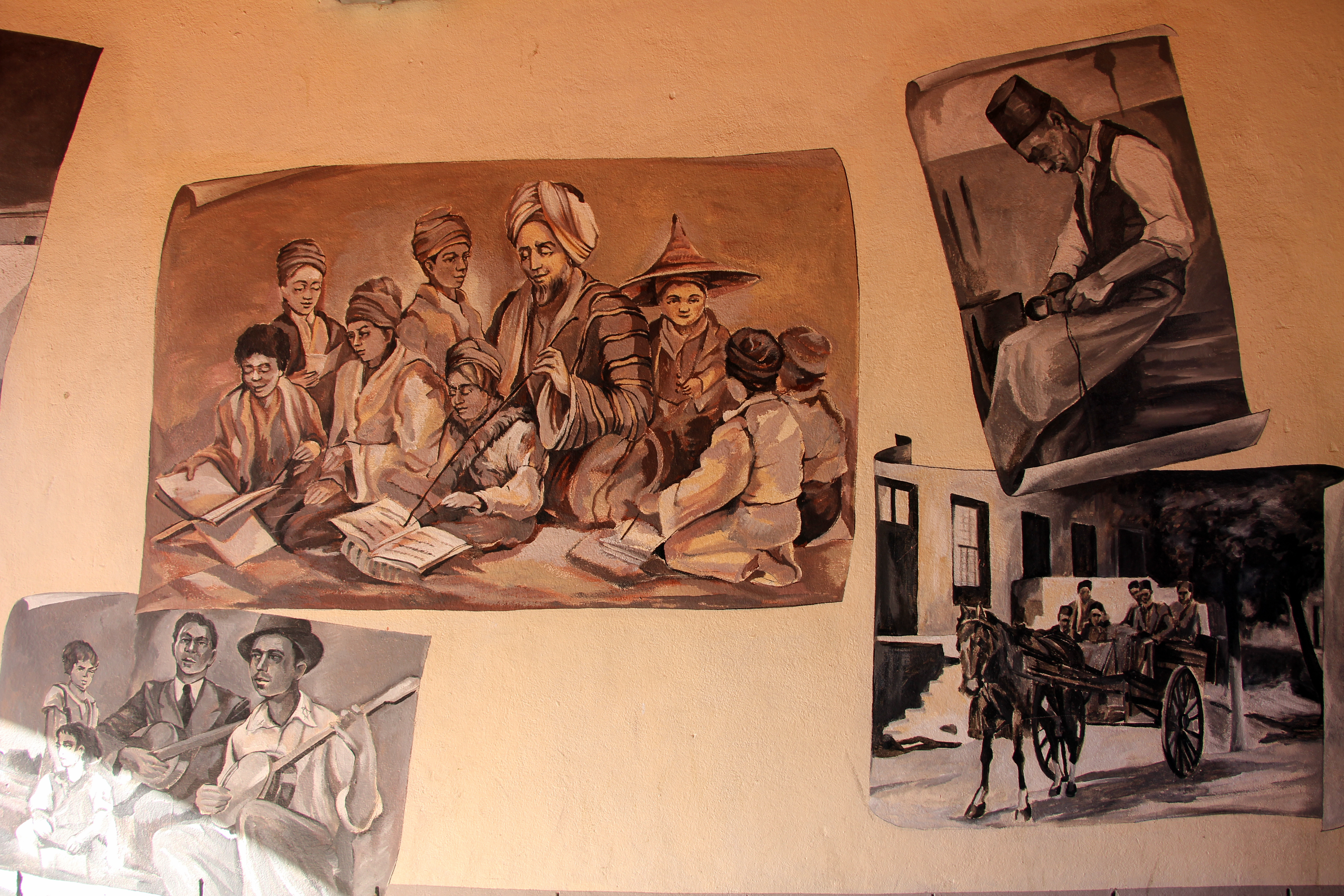
Painted murals at 93 Wale Street

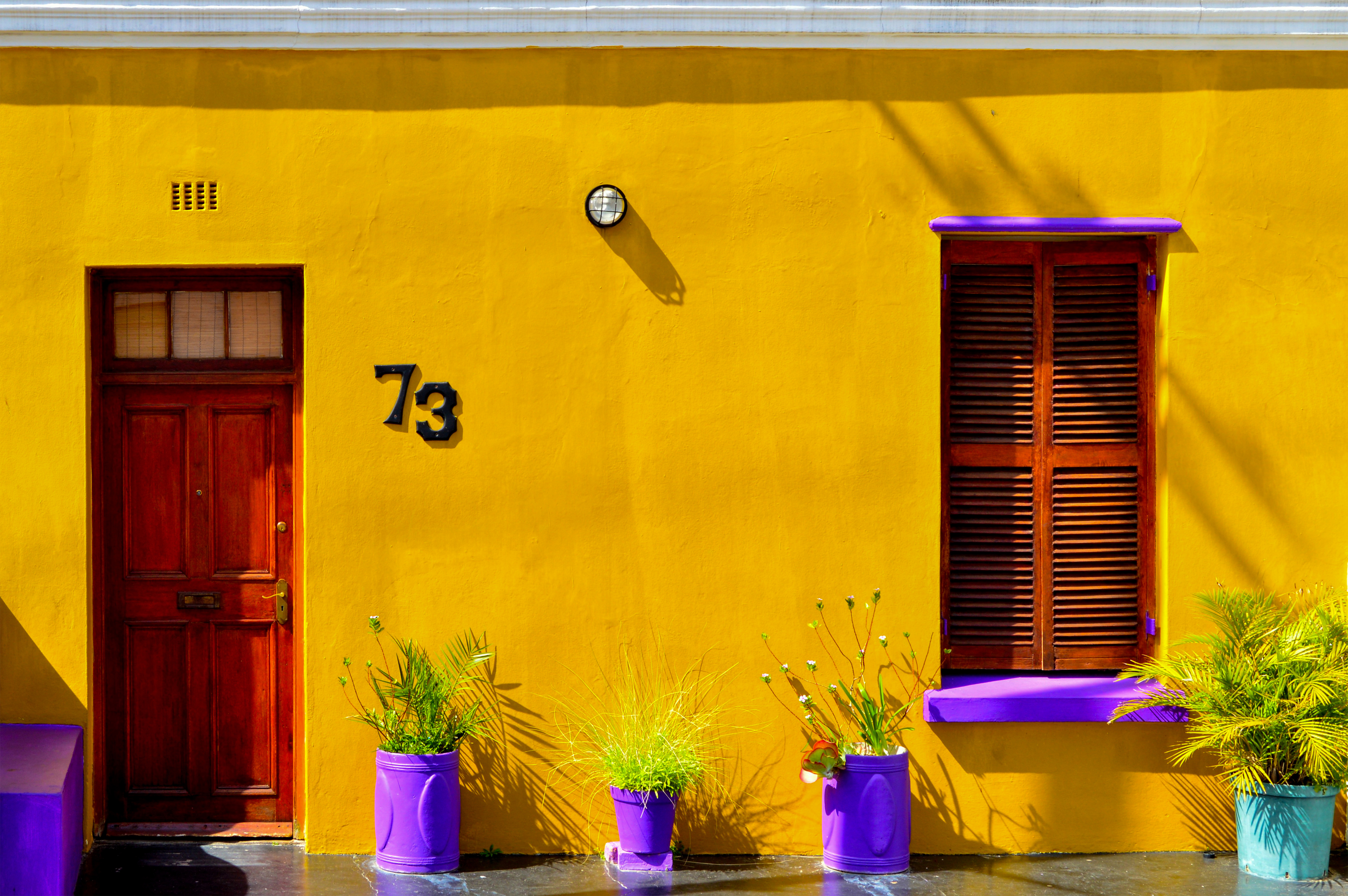
73 Chiappini Street

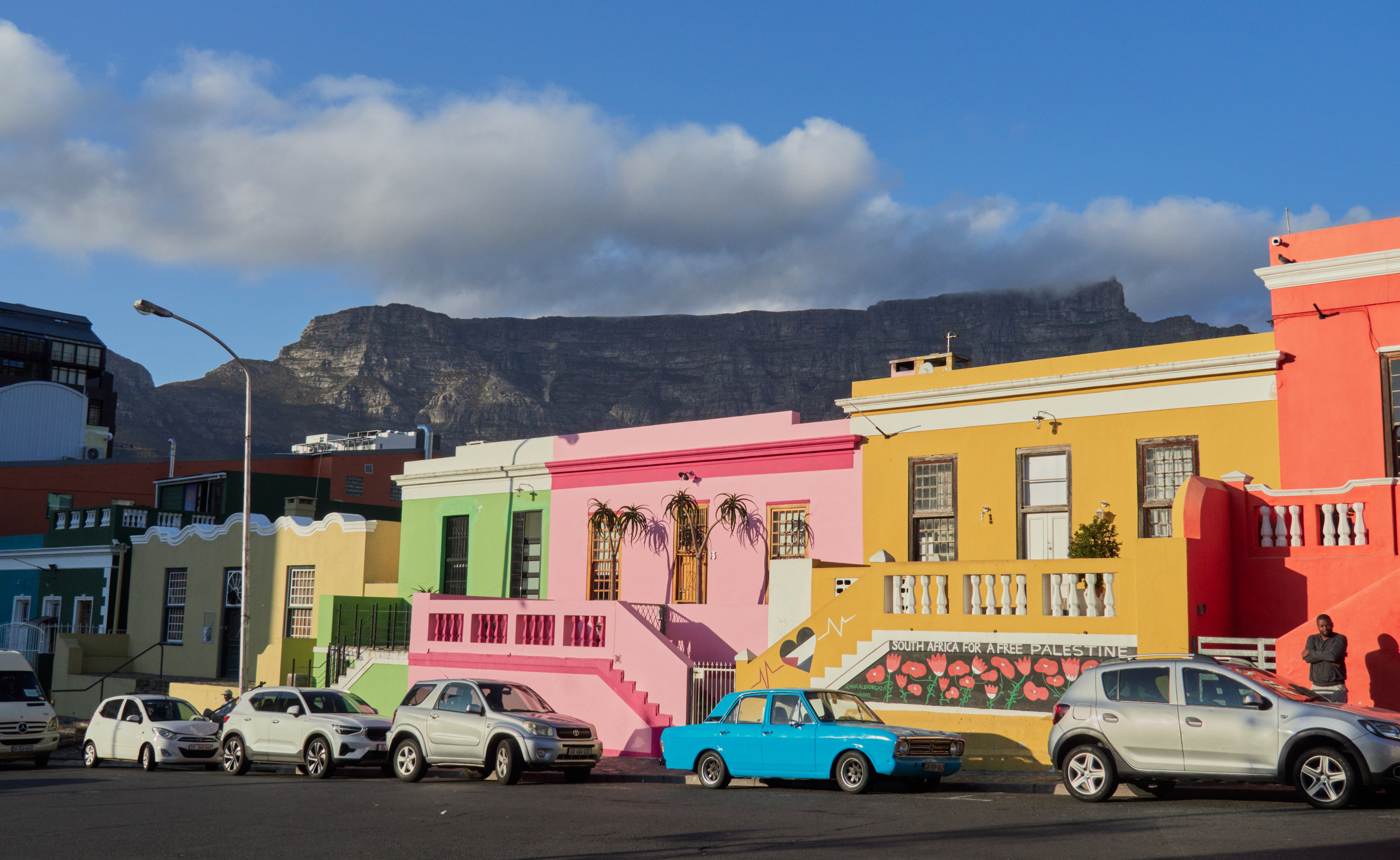
Colourful terraced houses lining a street in Bo-Kaap, with Table Mountain visible in the background.

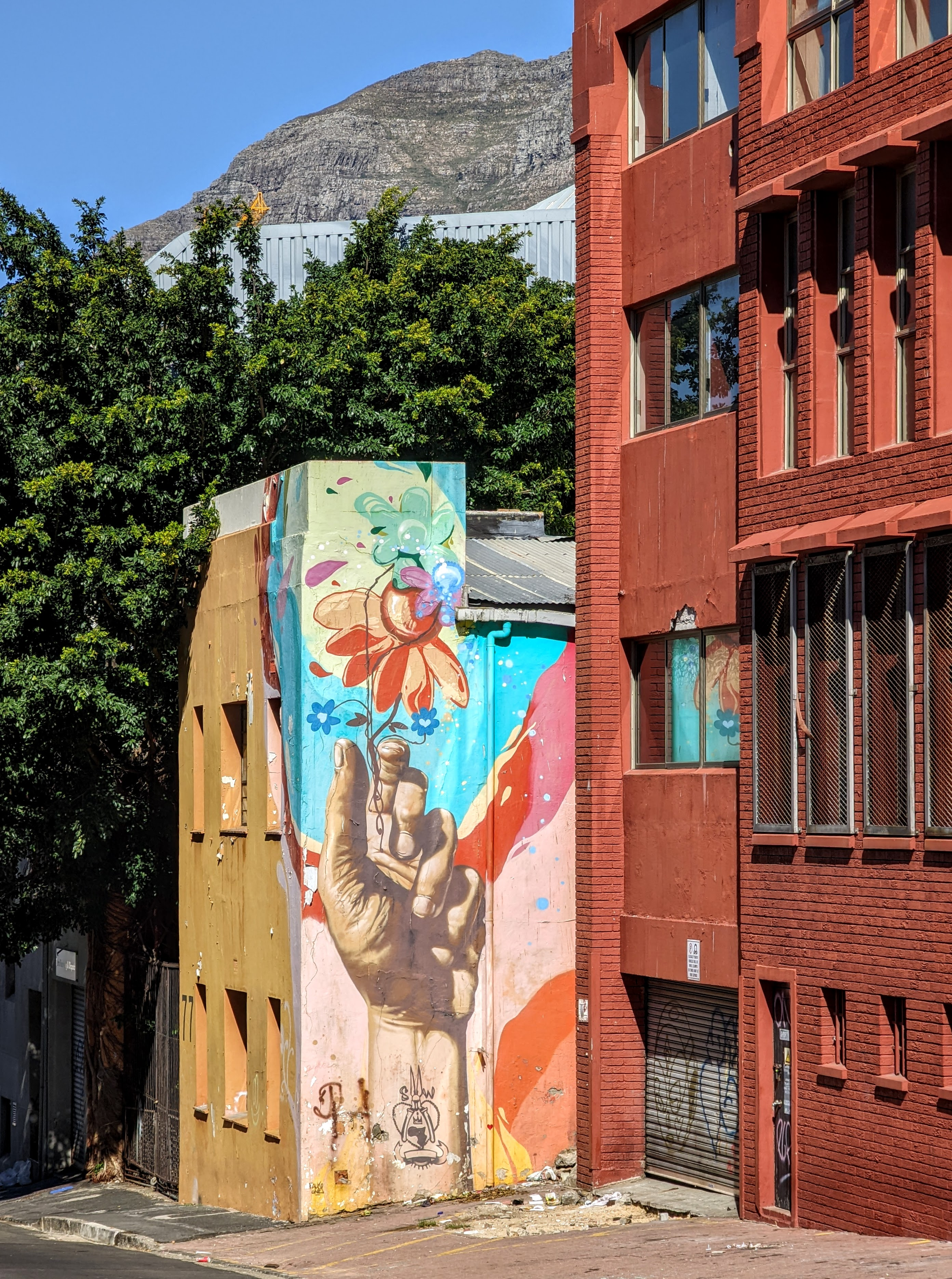
Shortmarket Street, view from Rose Street
