= Muslim Union Party =

Muslims Union Party
- Leader: Abdul Aziz Malazada
- Founded: 1979
- Headquarters: Zahedan, Iran
- Ideology: Islamism; Clericalism; Regionalism; Anti-communism
- Religion: Sunni Islam
- Assembly for the Final Review of the Constitution: 2 / 73

The Muslim Union Party, the Muslims Unity Party or the Party of Muslim Unity (Persian: حزب اتحادالمسلمین, romanized: hezb-e ettehad-ol-moslemin) was a political party based in Sistan and Baluchestan Province, Iran.

== History ==
On 16 January 1979, just before Mohammad Reza Shah left the country, the Party of Muslim Reform (Persian: حزب اصلاح‌المسلمین, romanized: Hizb-i Islah al-Muslimin) was established by Abdul Aziz Malazada. Marxist organizations criticized the organization for "sitting on the fence between conservatism and revolution" and Mullazadeh met with Ruhollah Khomeini, which led to his role as "a privileged intermediary of central power" in the region.

The party Muslim Union Party was founded in early 1979 by clerics under the leadership of Mullazadeh. It soon became influential and "emerged as the only accredited institution admitted to articulate the demands of the Baloch in the capital". The party supported the Iranian Revolution and called for people to vote in favor of the proposed Islamic Republic in the March 1979 regime change referendum. They also slammed nationalist and Marxist organizations.

They successfully sent delegates to the Assembly for the Final Review of the Constitution in the election held in August 1979, and subsequently opposed articles 12 and 13 in the new constitution. The articles in question acknowledged Zoroastrians, Jews and Christians as the only "recognized religious minorities" in Iran; declared Twelver Shia as the official religion and Jaʽfari jurisprudence as the juridical tradition. Another conflict was that the constitution barred non-Shia citizens to become the President of Iran. As a result, the party called for boycotting the constitutional referendum in December 1979.

In September 1979, some members of the party left it and took up arms in Iranshahr due to "Mullazada's conciliatory attitude towards Khomeini".

In October 1979, the party played an active role during the campaigns for the municipal election in Zahedan, which fueled the tension between the Sunni and the Shia people of the city. However, it then boycotted the election which was later nullified.

The party antagonized itself with a loose coalition of left-wing and Baloch nationalist guerilla organizations in 1980. They included Baluchistan People's Democratic Organization (which albeit being the most important group, had only 200 active members), The Baluchistan Liberation Front (led by Ibrahim Zardkuyi) and Balòč Peš Margà ("Baloch Franc Tireurs", led by Saravan tribal chief Aman-Allah Barakzayi). Muslim Union Party was divided by internal factionalism and some of its cadre went to exile in Pakistan. Mullazadeh entrusted part of his responsibilities in the party to his son Abdolmalek (1949–1996), who was also a cleric. This happened after Mullazadeh suffered from heart disease and was hospitalized after 1980.

== Organization ==
The group was closely associated with the Sunni mosque Makki and its imam Abdulaziz Mullazadeh. According to Stéphane Dudoignon, they adopted the model of the Combatant Clergy Association, a clerical organization set up by the pupils and protégés of Ruhollah Khomeini.

American observer Selig S. Harrison attributed organization of the party to "a network of some 400 mawlawis". In the coastal regions of Makran, where clerics came from Mullazai tribe, they could easily assume the leadership.

== Founder ==
Mufti Abdul Aziz Malazada

President of Muslim Union Party
- In office 1979–1980
- Succeeded by: Abdolmalek Malazada

Member of Assembly for the Final Review of the Constitution
- In office 18 August 1979 – 15 November 1979

Personal life
- Born: 1917 Central District (Sarbaz County), Sistan and Baluchestan province
- Died: 1987 (aged 69–70)
- Main interest: Politics
- Notable works: Jameh Mosque of Makki; Jamiah Darul Uloom Zahedan; Muslim Union Party
- Education: Darul Uloom Deoband; Madrasa Aminia

Religious life
- Religion: Islam
- Denomination: Sunni
- Jurisprudence: Hanafi
- Tariqa: Naqshbandi
- Movement: Deobandi

Muslim leader
- Teacher: Kifayatullah Dehlawi
- Influenced: Abdolhamid Ismaeelzahi, Ahmad Narouei

Abdul Aziz Malazada (1917 – 1987) was a Sunni scholar, jurist and politician from Iran. He is renowned for his efforts to promote Sunni beliefs and teachings in the region, as well as for his contributions to Islamic scholarship and jurisprudence. He established and managed several religious institutions, including the Jamiah Darul Uloom Zahedan, where he trained numerous scholars and students of Islamic sciences. He was also actively involved in politics and social affairs, serving as a member of the Assembly for the Final Review of the Constitution and founder and leader of Muslim Union Party. He was a vocal advocate for the rights of Sunnis in Iran and played a key role in promoting interfaith harmony and understanding. In addition, he was a writer and poet, authoring several books on Islamic law, theology, and spirituality.

Abdul Aziz Malazada was born in 1917 in the village of Depkor, Sarbaz in Sistan and Baluchestan province and died on 1987.

== See also ==
- Deobandi movement in Iran
- List of Deobandi organisations
