= Index of Deobandi movement–related articles =

This page list topics related to Deobandi movement.

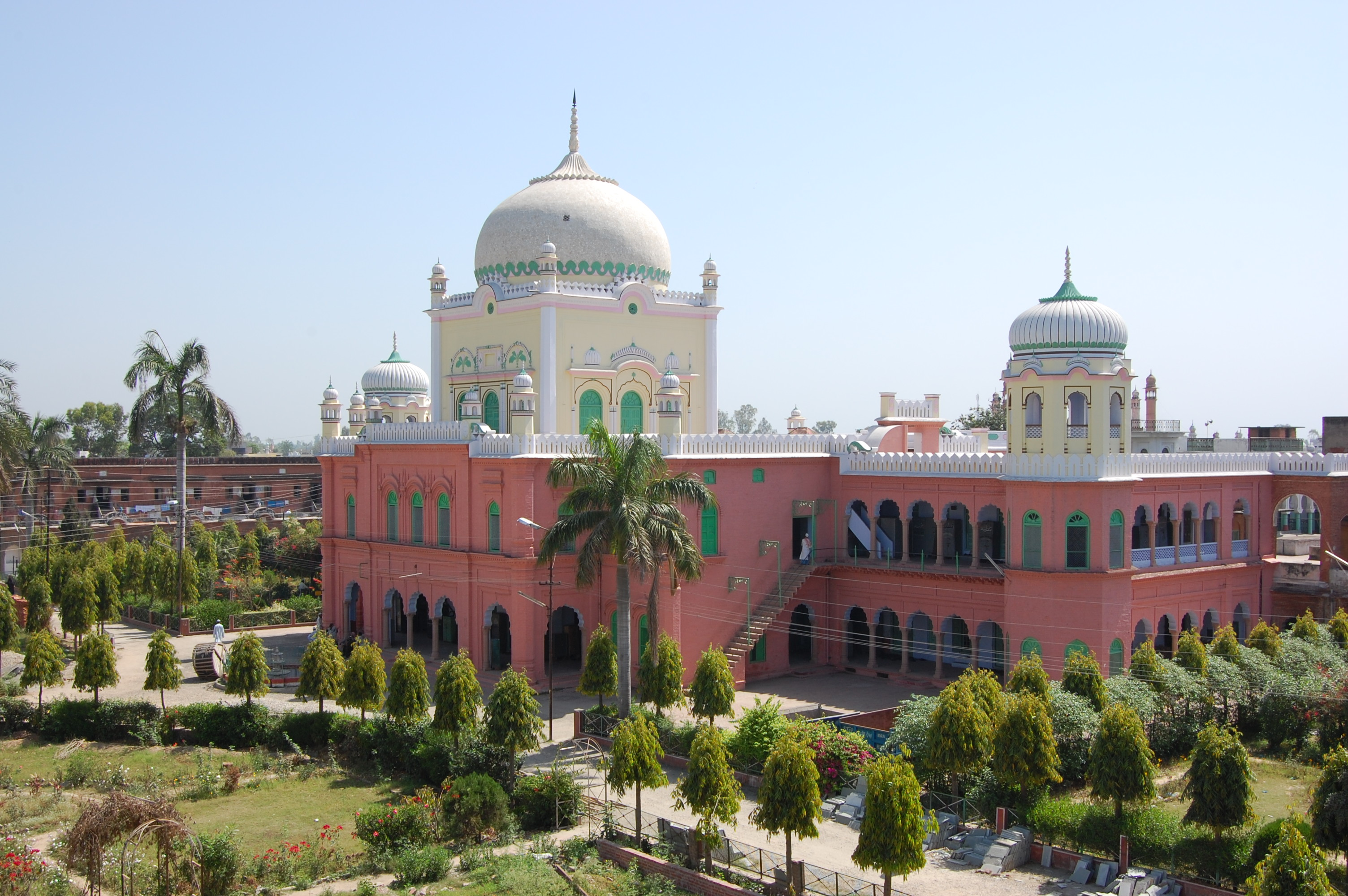

- Deobandi movement
- Deobandi movement in South Africa
- Deobandi movement in Iran
- Deobandi fiqh
- Deobandi hadith studies
- Deobandi politics
- Deobandi jihadism
- Bibliography of Deobandi movement
- Deoband–Aligarh relations
- Foundation of Darul Uloom Deoband
- List of Deobandis
- List of Deobandi madrasas
- List of Deobandi organisations
- List of Qawmi Madrasas in Bangladesh
- The Deoband School And The Demand For Pakistan
- Islamic Revival in British India
- Revival from Below
