= Deobandi politics =

Contribution of Deobandi movement

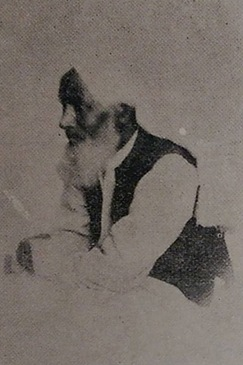
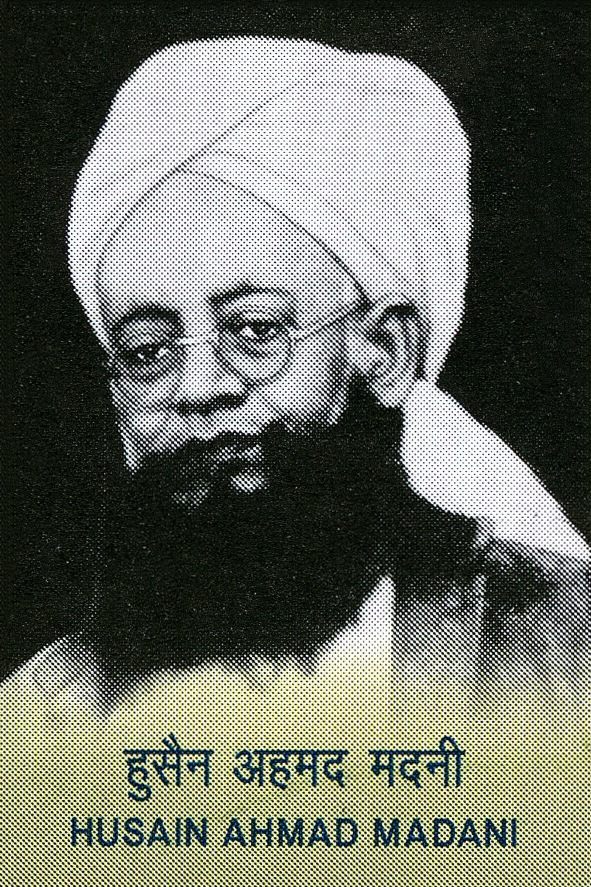
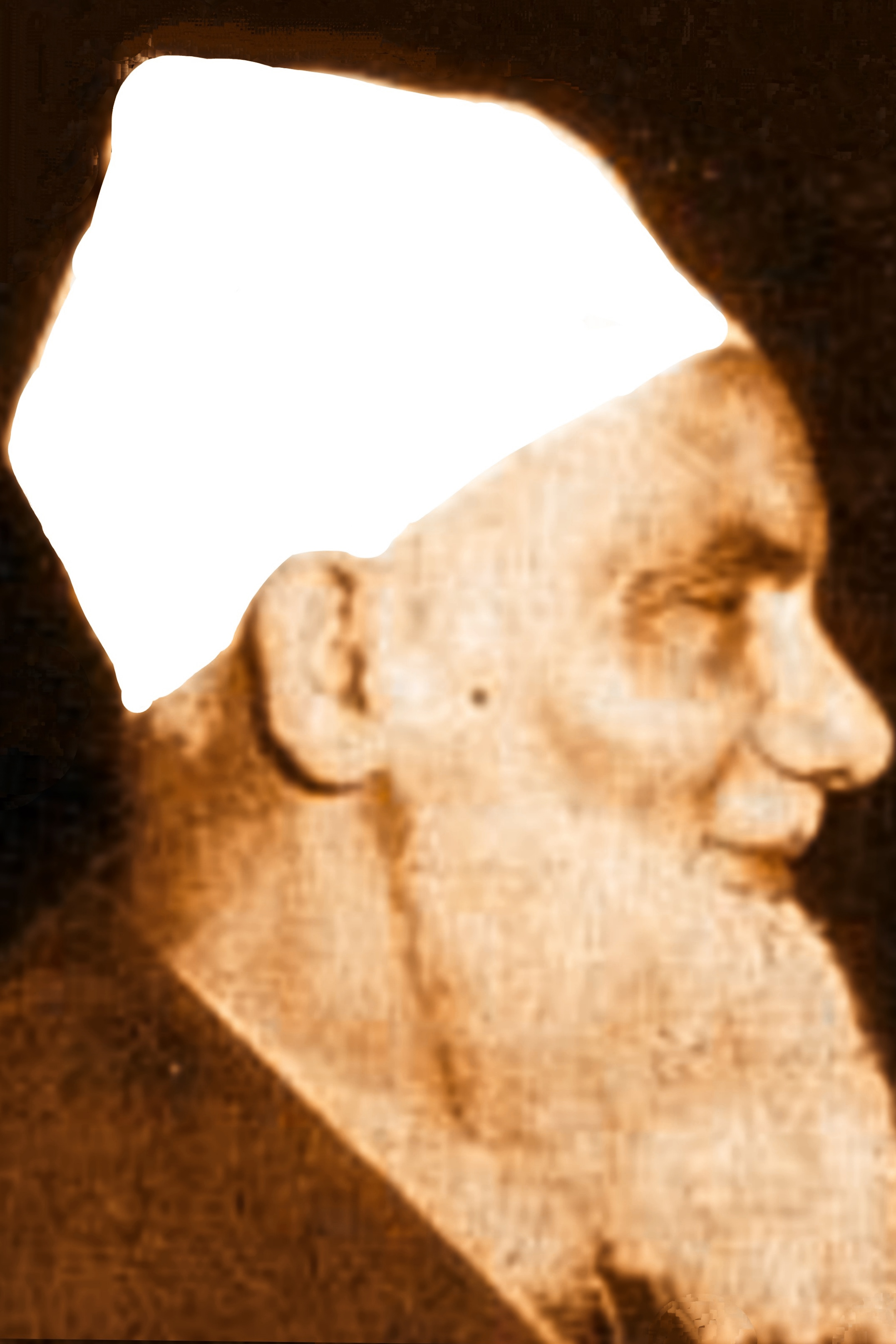
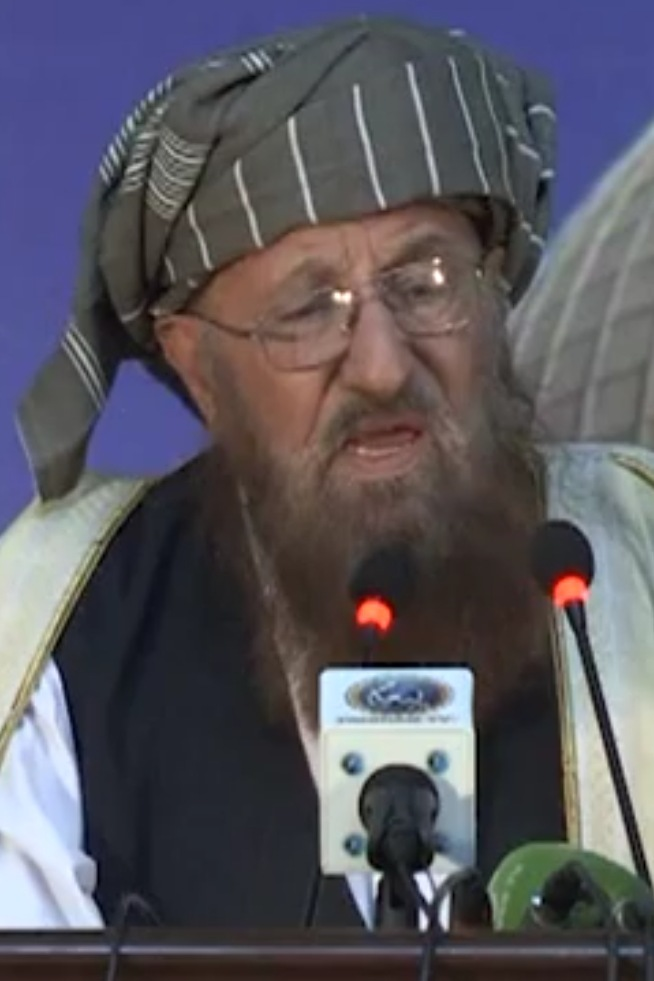
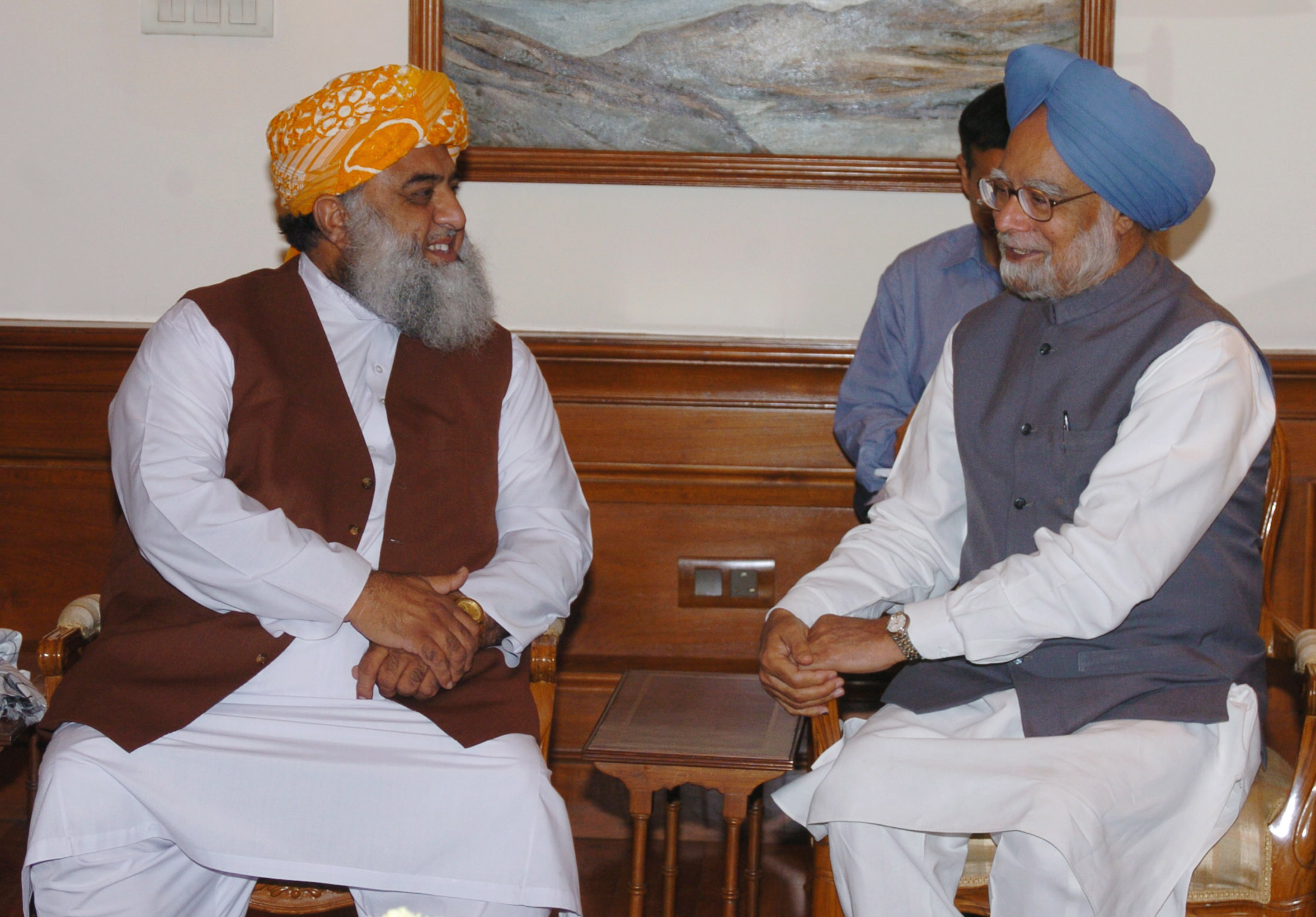
- From top left to right: Flag of the Islamic Emirate of Afghanistan, Mahmud Hasan Deobandi, Hussain Ahmad Madani, Sabbir Ahmad Usmani, Sami-ul-Haq, Fazal-ur-Rehman (left) with Prime minister of India

Ideologies
- Deobandi jihadism, Deobandi composite nationalism

Parties
- Jamiat Ulema-e-Hind, Majlis-e Ahrar-e Islam, Jamiat Ulema-e-Islam, Taliban, Muslim Union Party, Jamiat Ulema-e-Islam (F), Jamiat Ulema-e-Islam (S), Jamiat Ulema-e-Islam Bangladesh, Nizam-e-Islam Party, Bangladesh Khilafat Andolan, Islami Andolan Bangladesh

Deobandi politics refers to a political phenomenon that originated during the 1857 Indian Rebellion in British India. Its primary objective is to establish Sharia law in various parts of the world, with a particular focus on South Asia. The movement is associated with the promotion of a conservative and orthodox interpretation of Islam that emphasizes strict adherence to Islamic law and tradition, and frequently concentrates on moral and social issues, such as the promotion of Islamic education and the defense of traditional values. The Deobandi movement has not adopted a singular model to achieve its objectives and has utilized both militant struggle and mainstream politics. Deobandi politics has undergone three waves of armed struggle, which can be identified as Deobandi jihadism. The first two waves failed, but the third wave resulted in the establishment of an Islamic state named the Islamic Emirates of Afghanistan. During the second wave of armed struggle, Mahmud Hasan Deobandi attempted to defeat the British in India with the assistance of the Ottoman Empire. However, his attempt failed, and he was arrested by the British. After his release, he and his disciples engaged in mainstream politics and were associated with the creation of political parties and social movements, such as the Jamiat Ulema-e-Hind. During the Indian freedom struggle, the Jamiat Ulema-e-Hind evolved and embraced composite nationalism, rejecting the partition of India as the better future for Indian Muslims. Nevertheless, other Deobandis refused to accept this and developed Muslim nationalism against composite nationalism, establishing the Jamiat Ulema-e-Islam to support the creation of Pakistan.

== Background ==
In 1600, Elizabeth I of England granted a charter to the East India Company, giving it the privilege to conduct trade in the Orient. The company later secured the right to trade in Surat from the Mughal administration in 1612. In 1615, with the approval of Mughal Emperor Jahangir, the company established trading posts on both the western and eastern coasts of South India. Over time, the British East India Company steadily expanded its trade and political influence throughout India. The company's rule over India began in 1757 when it defeated the Siraj ud-Daulah in the Battle of Plassey.

By the 12th century, the Indian subcontinent had been under the control of Muslim rulers. However, the power of the Muslims began to wane, and the British eventually took over as a result of their comprehensive efforts to undermine the economic, social, and political power of Muslim society. Shah Waliullah Dehlawi initiated efforts to revive the Muslim community in India, which had been in decline. Following his death, his son, Shah Abdul Aziz Dehlavi, carried on his work, declaring jihad as a duty to save India and issuing a fatwa to that effect. To lead this movement, he selected Syed Ahmad Barelvi, who was later killed in the Battle of Balakot in 1831 along with his disciple Shah Ismail Dehlvi. Despite these losses, the movement of Muslims in India continued to persist.

In 1857, it took the form of the Indian Rebellion. During this time, an independent Islamic territory was briefly established in the Thana Bhawan area of the Saharanpur district in Uttar Pradesh. The temporary government that was formed in this area was led by Chief Justice Rashid Ahmad Gangohi, Commander in Chief Muhammad Qasim Nanautavi, and Amir al-Mu'minin Imdadullah Muhajir Makki. On September 14, 1857, the Battle of Shamli was fought against the British under the leadership of this temporary government, in which Hafiz Muhammad Zamin was martyred. The leadership subsequently went into hiding, and the government of the independent Thana Bhawan ultimately fell. Despite the failure of the Indian Rebellion, it marked a turning point in British colonial rule and paved the way for significant changes in the administration of India. The British government responded to the rebellion by announcing the arrest and offering rewards for the capture of Imdadullah Muhajir Makki, Muhammad Qasim Nanautavi, and Rashid Ahmad Gangohi. In 1858, the Government of India Act put an end to the East India Company's rule in India and established direct control of the British government over the country. After a long period of hiding, Imdadullah Muhajir Makki was eventually able to emigrate to Mecca in 1859. A few days later, when a general amnesty was declared, Muhammad Qasim Nanautavi and Rashid Ahmad Gangohi were released from hiding and resumed their activities.

In 1857, it was propagated that the British had won the war on behalf of God. In an effort to persuade and encourage the common people to convert to Christianity, they sought to change the educational system. As a result of the struggle for independence, war, and British intrigue, Muslim education and culture were left behind, and religious educational institutions lacked patronage and were destroyed. Non-Islamic culture spread within Muslim society. In this situation, with the goal of creating activism and awareness about Islam and the independence movement against imperialism and colonialism, a group of individuals under the guidance of Imdadullah Muhajir Makki and the leadership of Muhammad Qasim Nanautavi founded Darul Uloom Deoband on May 30, 1866. The institution was established under a pomegranate tree in the courtyard of the Chatta Mosque in the Saharanpur district of Uttar Pradesh, India. The founding members included those who had participated in the Indian Rebellion of 1857.

== Ideology ==
=== Deobandi jihadism ===
Deobandi jihadism refers to a militant interpretation of Islam that draws upon the teachings of the Deobandi movement.

=== Deobandi composite nationalism ===
Deobandi composite nationalism emerged in late 1930s British India, advocating for composite nationalism in the country's struggle for independence while opposing its partition.

== See also ==
- Index of Deobandi movement–related articles
