= Deobandi movement in Iran =

History of Deobandi movement

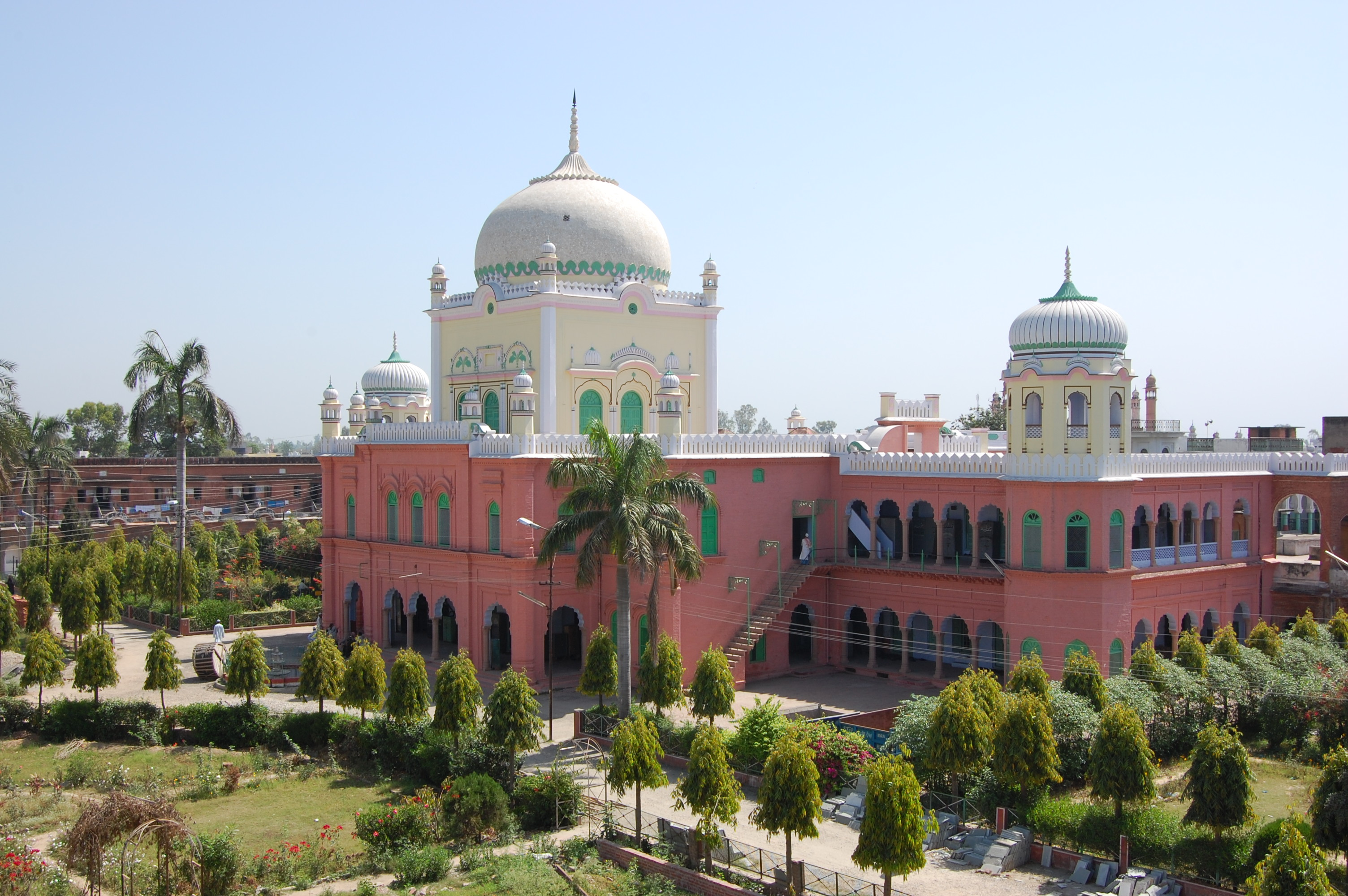
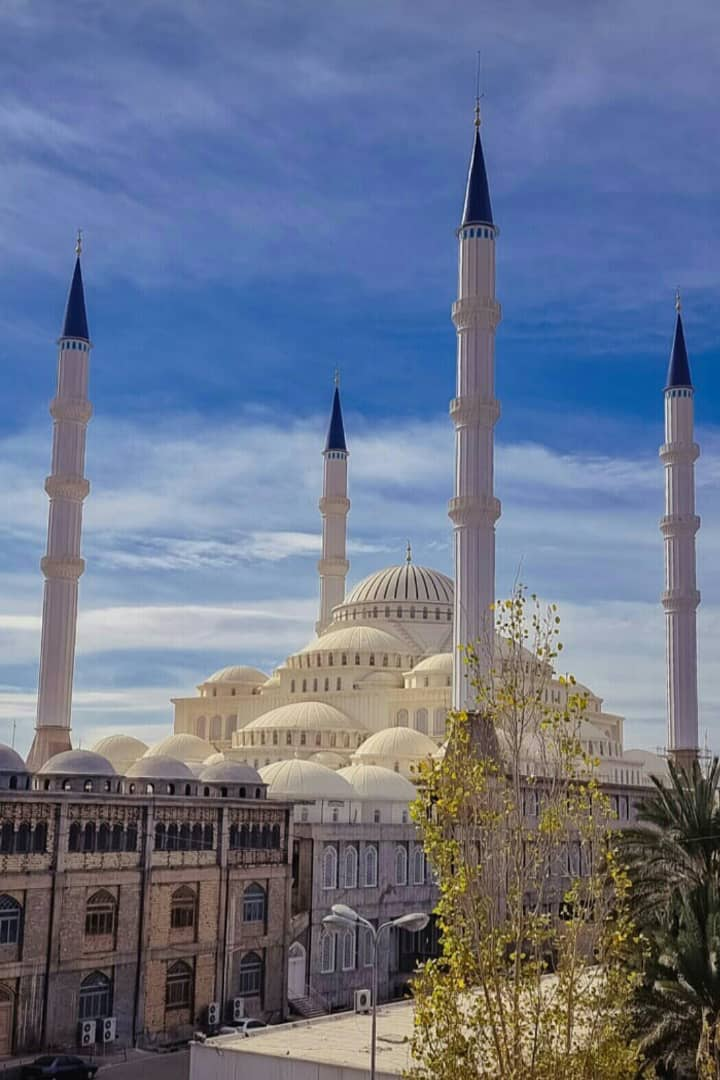
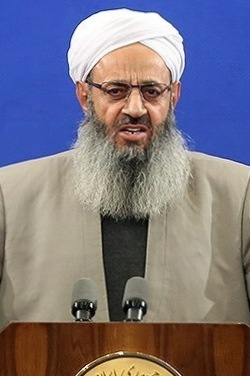
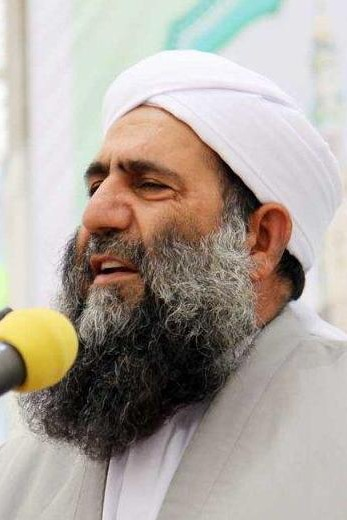
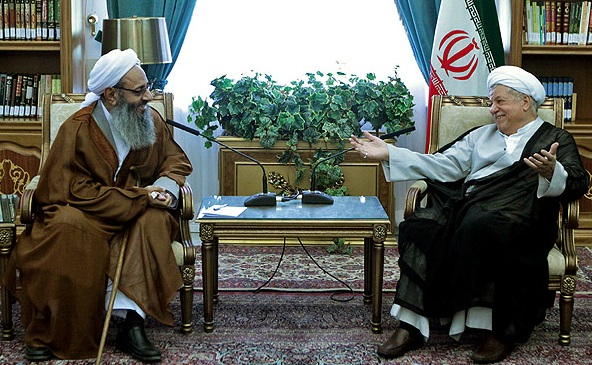
- Clockwise from top: Darul Uloom Deoband, Abdul Aziz Malazada, Ahmad Narouei, Akbar Hashemi Rafsanjani with Abdolhamid Ismaeelzahi, Abdolhamid Ismaeelzahi, Jameh Mosque of Makki

Darul Uloom Deoband was established in 1866 in the Saharanpur district of Uttar Pradesh, India, as part of the anti-British movement. It gave rise to a traditional conservative Sunni movement known as the Deobandi movement. Students from various regions, including Sistan and Baluchestan in Iran, attended Deoband, which led to the spread of its founders ideas. This movement had a significant impact on some of the new generation of Iranian intellectuals in the late 19th and early 20th centuries. After entering Iran, the students of this madrasa continued to expand this thinking and with the formation of missionary groups. These thoughts have been strengthened on one hand due to the cultural relationships between the Baloch tribes and on the other hand due to the connection of Sistan and Baluchestan's Iran and India's Hanafi religious leaders in Iran. Today, the Deobandi movement is one of the intellectual currents in Sistan and Baluchestan and preaching groups are active in different cities and villages. Its playing a crucial role in Iran's political landscape. The Deobandis aimed to homogenize religious schools and were opposed to certain popular practices.The Naqshbandi order played an important role in the Deobandi school of thought in the Persian-speaking world.

== Background ==
During the Qajar era, by separating a large part of Balochistan, Baloch tribes (who had been living in the southeast of Iran for centuries in a unified manner) became separated. However, the long-standing ties between the Baloch peoples led to the continuation of cultural relationships. With the occupation of Multan and Okara by Mir Chakar Rind and the settlement of Baloch tribes, these relationships entered a new phase. Mir Chakar died in Okara and was buried there. At the same time, a non-Muslim ethnic group called Jats harassed the Muslims of this region, prompting some commanders like Dost Mohammad Khan Baloch and Moses Khan to fight against them after receiving permission from Shah Waliullah.

Another way of cultural communication between Iran's Balochistan and India was the movement of followers of the Naqshbandi Sufi order. Among the Sufis of this order, Ahmad Sirhindi held a high position and thought of Darul Uloom Deoband was influenced by him also. Ahmad of Kalat in Iranian Balochistan requested in a letter in 1939 that scholars be sent to Kalat to draft laws and create unity in Balochistan. In response to this request, Qari Muhammad Tayyib and Shamsul Haq Afghani were dispatched to Kalat. After drafting some laws, Shamsul Haq Afghani remained in Balochistan at the insistence of the ruler of Kalat and took charge of the administration of religious affairs.

Following the growth of the Deobandi madrasa, a number of Baloch youth went to this madrasas. This group was in a difficult economic situation, but after Mir Ahmad Yar Khan's trip to Delhi, he became familiar with the situation of Baloch students and decided to financially support each of them with a monthly amount of ten rupees. After that, Mir Ahmad Yar Khan founded a madrasa called "Jamia Nasiriya" in memory of his grandfather to educate Baloch students.

In 1942, the governor of Kalat instructed the head of the Jamia Nasiriya to select thirty talented students who were academically advanced to send to Darul Uloom Deoband for further study. The scholars who went to Deoband returned to Balochistan after completing their studies and created a new academic movement in religious schools. Their ideas not only influenced the religious beliefs of the Baloch people, but also had an impact on their customs, culture, and even their outward appearance.

After returning to Balochistan, the Deobandi students started extensive activities to bring about social and cultural reforms. Prior to their arrival, there was a low level of religious awareness in the region, and the people's thoughts were a mixture of superstition, traditionalism, sacredness of stones and trees, and worship of natural phenomena. The mentioned students began a fight against superstition in remote villages and areas, cutting down trees that were considered sacred by the locals and eliminating the sanctity of natural phenomena. The support of religious leaders and local rulers was also effective in the success of these scholars. Some of the Deobandi clerics destroyed centers that they considered to be engaged in polytheism with hammers and axes. They strongly opposed the presence of both men and women at the graves of false saints and strongly rejected the belief that the souls of the saints became aware of people's conditions and could help them if they visited their graves. The Deobandi scholars also condemned the mystics who played music and used tobacco and condemned their claims that they considered begging to be permissible in the guise of being a leader or a mystic. Taking soil from the graves of saints and martyrs and eating or rubbing their bodies was declared forbidden by the Deobandi scholars. They also paid attention to reforming the customs and traditions related to death, mourning, and marriage. Some of the Deobandi scholars were judges in Balochistan. Individuals such as Abdullah Malazada, Abdul Aziz Malazada, Abdul Samad Sarbazi. Qazi Khair Mohammad Hassan Zahi and Qazi Dad Rahman Riyasi also reached the highest judicial positions, namely Qazi-ul-Quzat (Chief Justice).

Some of the Deobandi clerics were called Qadi due to their fame in the field of judging. Nowadays, many of the disputes among people are also resolved by the Mullahs. In the Madrasa of each city, the "Dar al-Ifta" department is responsible for answering legal issues.

Another impact of Deobandi scholars was their inclination towards Sufism. They were associated with mentors in the Indian subcontinent to achieve spiritual and ethical purification. After returning to Iran, Deobandi scholars maintained their connection with the Naqshbandi Sufis of Herat and pledged allegiance to them as disciples. However, due to the prevalence of inappropriate practices among their successors in Balochistan, these relationships were severed.

With the expansion of the activities of Deobandi seminary students, people's participation in religious ceremonies and attention to the rules of the Sharia increased in Balochistan. Many of the nomadic tribes of Balochistan also received religious education and the mullahs gained great influence among the people. As a result of the activities of the clergy, who had mostly studied in madrasas in Pakistan or India, mosques or places for religious ceremonies were built in many villages in Balochistan. This group of clergy, called "mullahs", generally refrained from participating in political activities and were mostly engaged in teaching and education. The expansion of the central governments of Iran and Pakistan in recent decades has led to a reduction in the power of tribal leaders and an increase in the power of educated mullahs in Iranian Balochistan. The replacement of religious power for the power of tribal leaders in the region is one of the factors in the increase of religious awareness among the Baloch people.

Today, religious schools in Balochistan such as Ain al-Ulum Gosht, Majma al-Ulum Saravan, Dar al-Ulum Zangiyan, Jamia Aziziya Anzai, Manba al-Ulum Kohon Sarbaz, Ishaaat al-Tawhid and Jamiah Darul Uloom Zahedan, Jamiat al-Haramayn Chabahar and Dar al-Ulum Haqqania Iranshahr have expanded based mostly on the Deobandi school of thought.

The officials of these religious schools have formed the "Coordination Council of Sunni Religious Schools of Balochistan" since 1979, following the Deobandi movement in Pakistan. According to 2013 Statistics, 49 small and large madrasa with over eight thousand students in Sistan and Balochistan are under the umbrella of these schools. In recent years, girls madrasa called "Maktab al-Banat" have been established in most major cities and villages.

Another action taken by scholars affiliated with the Deobandi ideology was joining the Tablighi Jamaat circle. The formation of Tablighi Jaamat in Iran dates back to the time of the life of Abdul Aziz Malazada in Delhi. One day, he went to meet Ilyas Kandhlawi, the founder of the Tablighi Jaamat in India, and asked him for guidance on how to propagate religious affairs in Iran. Ilyas Kandhlawi promised to come to Iran and emphasized his support for them. After this meeting, in around 1952, a group of eighteen people visited Abdul Aziz Malazada's residence in the village of Depokur. This group was from the Tablighi Jaamat Raiwind in Pakistan, who, with the support of Abdul Aziz and other scholars in the region, engaged in preaching in Iran for three years. They were the first group of Tablighi Jaamat to enter Balochistan and the Sarbaz region. They were led by a person named Mushtaq. Nowadays, mosques in Zahedan, Iran Shahr, Khash, Saravan, Chabahar, Nikshahr and Konarak have Tablighi Jaamat circles.

Through two fundamentalist movements in Iran, the revival process of Sunni Islam is ongoing, one is the Deobandi movement and the other is the Muslim Brotherhood.

== Scholars ==
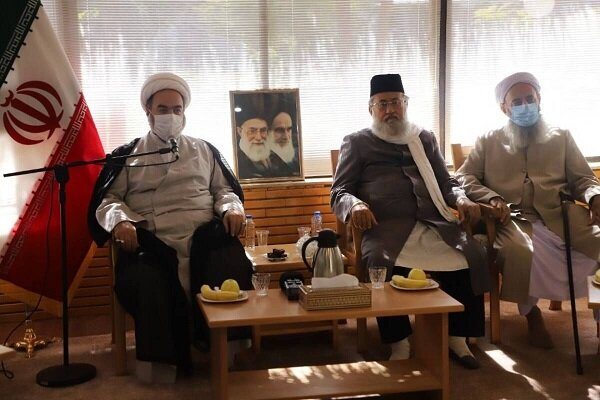
Salman Nadwi and Abdolhamid Ismaeelzahi with Ayatollah Mustafa Mahami

Prominent Deobandi scholars from Iran:

Abdul Aziz Malazada (d. 1987)	Founder of Jamiah Darul Uloom Zahedan, Muslim Union Party and member of Assembly for the Final Review of the Constitution.
Abdolhamid Ismaeelzahi (b. 1946)	He is regarded as a "spiritual leader for Iran’s Sunni Muslim population", according to Reuters. He enjoys support of the overwhelming majority of Baloch people in Iran, who hail him as their Molavi. He is the imam of the Jameh Mosque of Makki.
Ahmad Narouei (d. 2014)	Human rights activist, journalist and was a vice president of Jamiah Darul Uloom Zahedan.
Abdul Malik Malazada (d. 1995)	A political activist who was the head of the "Mohammadi Islamic Organization," which represented the Sunni community in Iran. He was assassinated in Karachi in 1995, and his murder is believed to be related to the chain murders of Iran.
Abdur Rahim Malazada (b. 1958)	Preacher and co-founder of the Persian-language Wahdat TV network (currently known as Tawhid Network). He was a critic of the Shia sect and the Islamic Republic of Iran.
Abdur Rahman Mollazahi (b. 1906)	Member of the Planning Council for Sunni religious schools in the country, the founder of the "Jamiah al-Haramain al-Sharifain Chabahar", and a member of the Coordination Council for Sunni schools in Sistan and Baluchestan province.
Mohammad Omar Sarbazi (d. 2007)	Founder of the "Manba al-Ulum Kohvan". His mastery of mysticism, exegesis, hadith, jurisprudence, fatwa gave him great influence and credibility among both the general public and the elite of the Sunni community in Balochistan.

== Institutions ==
Some notable Deobandi institutions in Iran:

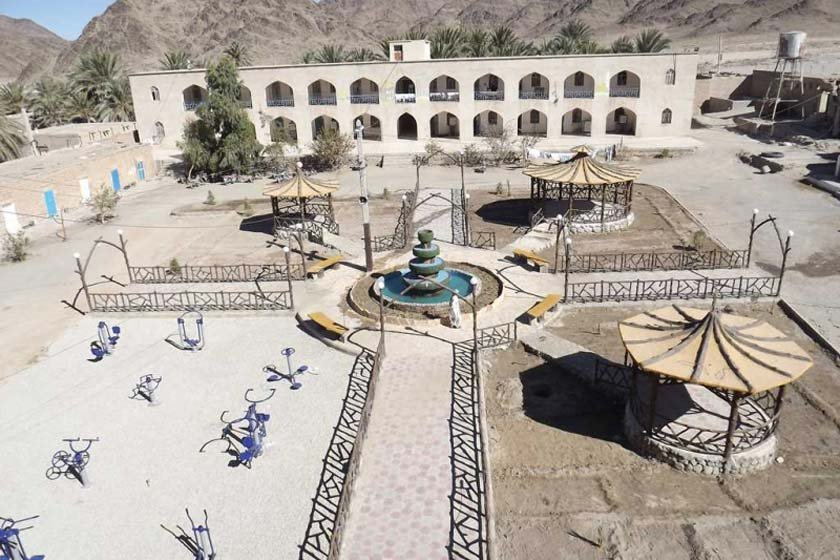
Ain al-Ulum Gosht

Jamiah Darul Uloom Zahedan	Largest and highest seat of Deobandis in Iran.
Jameh Mosque of Makki	Largest Sunni mosque in Iran and is located in the center of Zahedan, the capital of the province Sistan and Baluchestan.
Ain al-Ulum Gosht	It was founded in 1939 by Abdulwahid Seyyedzadeh and is considered the oldest religious school in eastern Iran.

== Organizations ==
Some notable Deobandi organizations in Iran:

Muslim Union Party	A political party based in Sistan and Baluchestan province, founded in early 1979 by clerics under the leadership of Abdul Aziz Malazada. It gained 2 seats in the Assembly for the Final Review of the Constitution.

== See also ==
- Index of Deobandi movement–related articles
