= Jameh Mosque of Makki =

Mosque in Zahedan, Sistan and Baluchestan, Iran

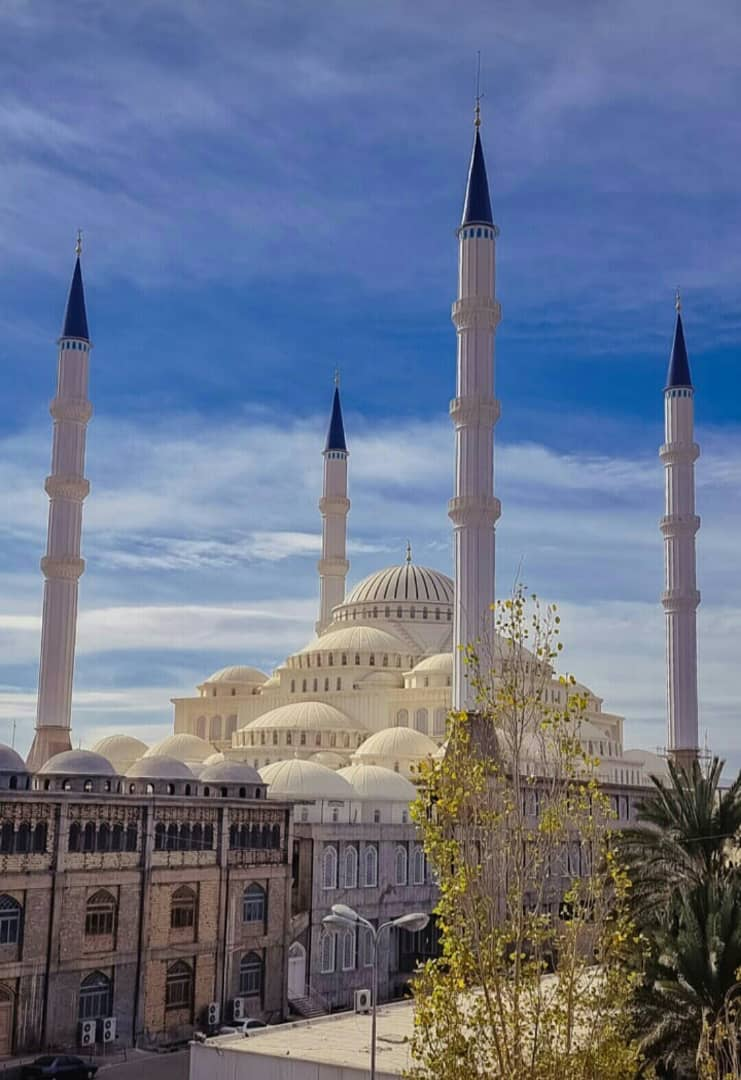

- Location of the mosque in Iran

Religion
- Affiliation: Sunni Islam
- Sect: Hanafi Deobandi
- Ecclesiastical or organisational status: Friday mosque
- Leadership: Molavi Abdul Hamid (imam)
- Status: Active

Location
- Location: Zahedan, Sistan and Baluchestan
- Country: Iran
- Coordinates: 29°29′19.8″N 60°51′14.4″E

Architecture
- Type: Mosque architecture
- Style: Ottoman
- Founder: Abdul Aziz Malazada
- Completed: 1971 (first structure); c. 2010 (expansion)

Specifications
- Capacity: 60,000 worshippers
- Interior area: 33,000 m^{2} (360,000 sq ft)
- Dome: 52
- Dome height (outer): 46 m (151 ft)
- Minaret: Four
- Minaret height: 92 m (302 ft)
- Site area: 50,000 m^{2} (540,000 sq ft)

The Jameh Mosque of Makki, officially the Grand Makki Mosque of Zahedan (Persian: مسجد جامع مکی زاهدان), also known as the Makki Mosque, is one of the world's largest Hanafi mosques, and the largest Sunni Friday mosque in Iran, located in the center of Zahedan, the capital of the Sistan and Baluchestan province. The mosque has a capacity of over 60,000 worshippers at any time.

== History ==
The founder of the mosque was Abdul Aziz Malazada who, until his death in 1987, had the most important Sunni religious authority of the Baloch in Sistan Baluchistan in Iran. The Makki Mosque was founded in 1971 as part of the Jamiat Darul Uloom seminary which is located next to the Makki mosque. The Darul Uloom is part of the Deobandi School.

The Darul Uloom in Zahedan is the center for the Sunni Baloch people who live in eastern Iran. From its founding in the early 1970s, it has become the center of a network of thousands of mosques in the region, 120 Deobandi madrasas and about seventy seminaries of which forty are under direct leadership of the Zahedan-based Darul Uloom.

For years, the mosque was overcrowded with a large number of worshippers and its space was inadequate for everyone to be able to pray inside the mosque. Prayers often had to be offered on the nearby streets. An expansion project was started which made the Makki Mosque the largest Sunni mosque in Iran after completion. In 2010, the old mosque building with its two minarets were demolished to make room for the new 50,000-square-metre (540,000 sq ft) mosque with four minarets.

Annual gatherings and conferences in the Makki Mosque attract large numbers of Deobandi and other Sunni scholars from Iran and neighboring countries like Afghanistan and Pakistan. These gatherings and conferences have often prominent Deobandi speakers like the president of the Darul Uloom in Karachi and speakers linked to the Tablighi Jamaat.

== Leadership ==
The founder of the Makki mosque Maulana Abd-al-Aziz Mullahzada (1916–1987) was a well-respected Deobandi scholar. He was the major proponent of the spread of the Deobandi thought in Sistan-Baluchistan. After being acknowledged as the religious authority of the Baluch people, his religious authority spread all over the Sunni communities in Iran.

As of 2025, the imam of the congregation is Molavi Abdul Hamid.

== Gallery ==
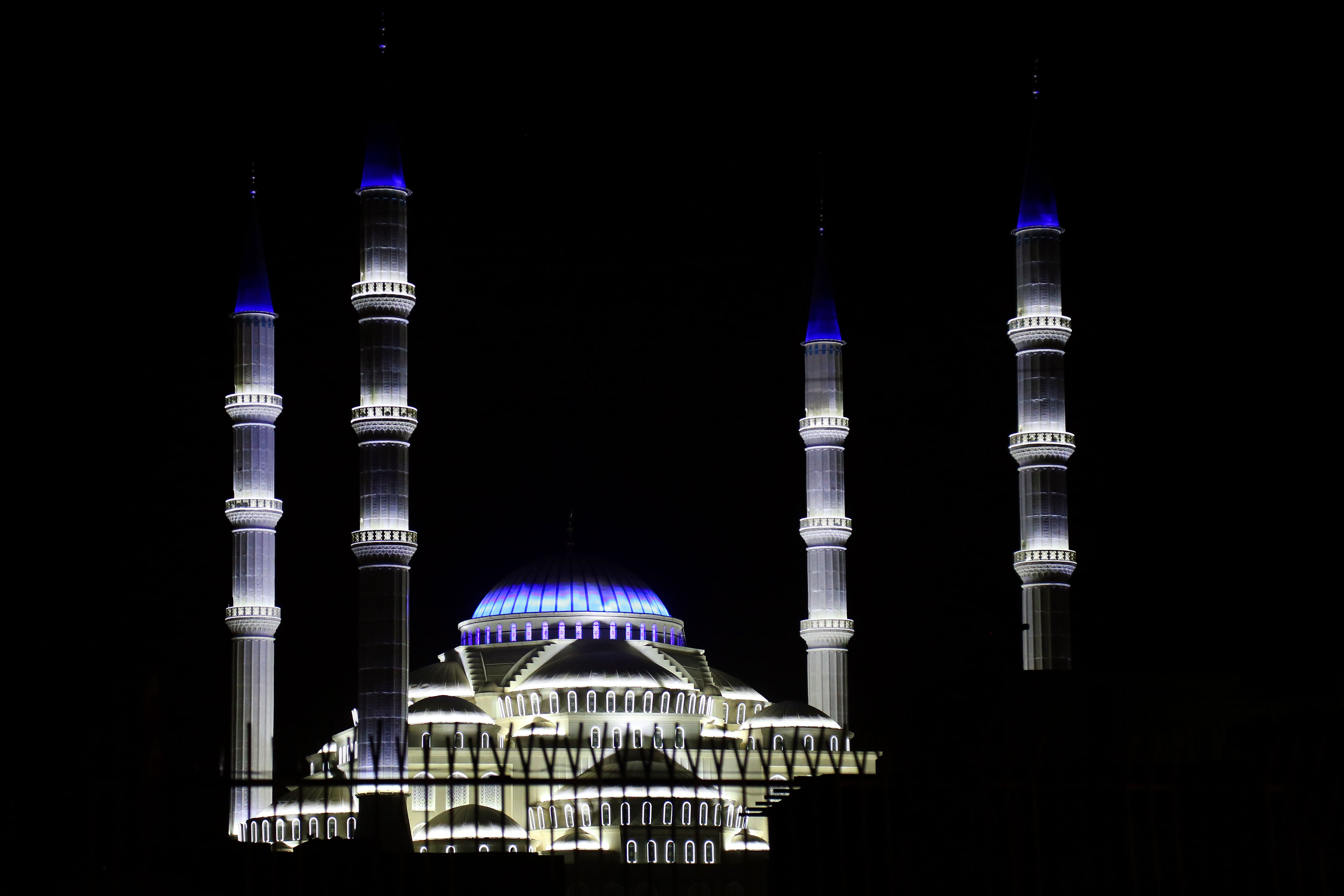

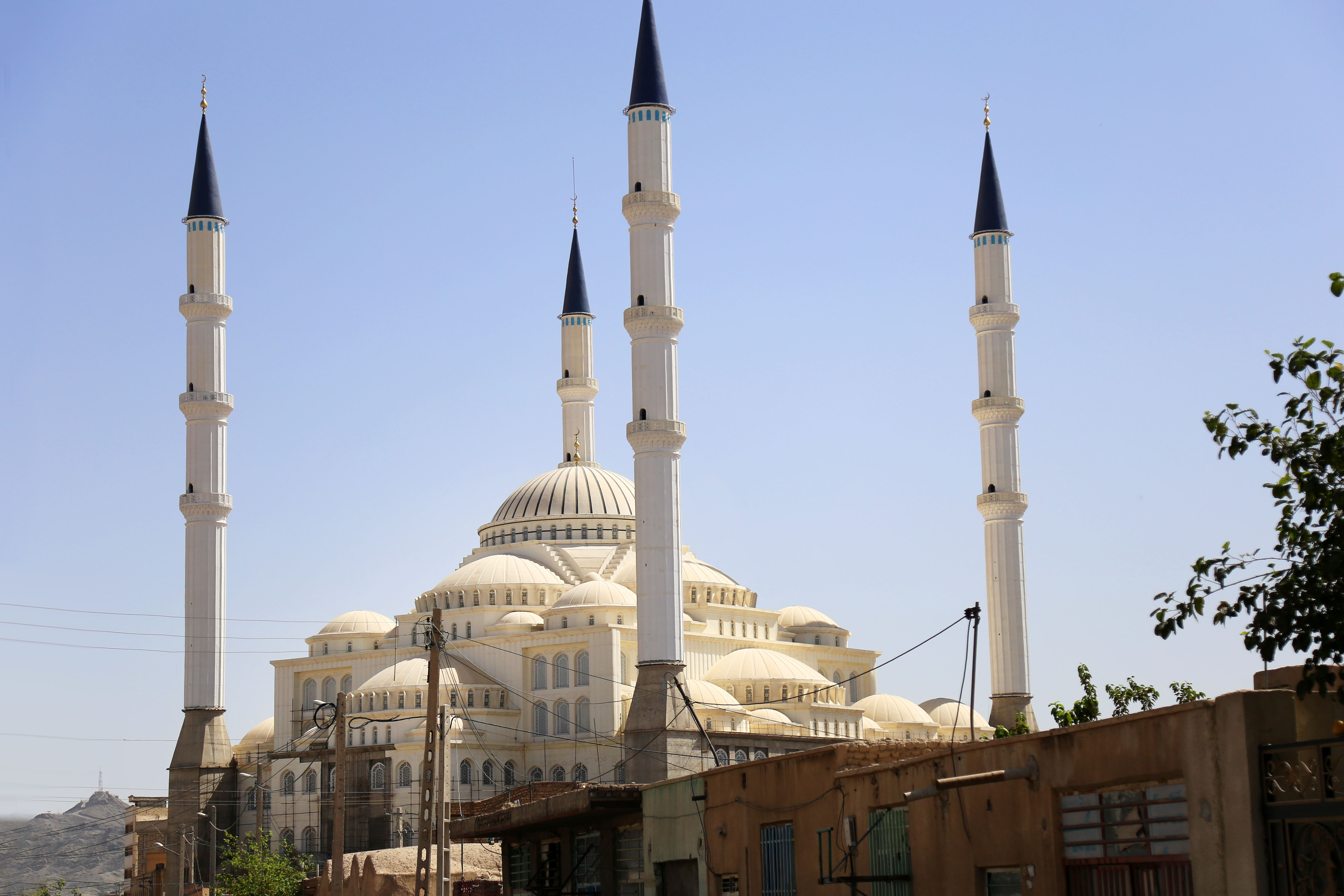

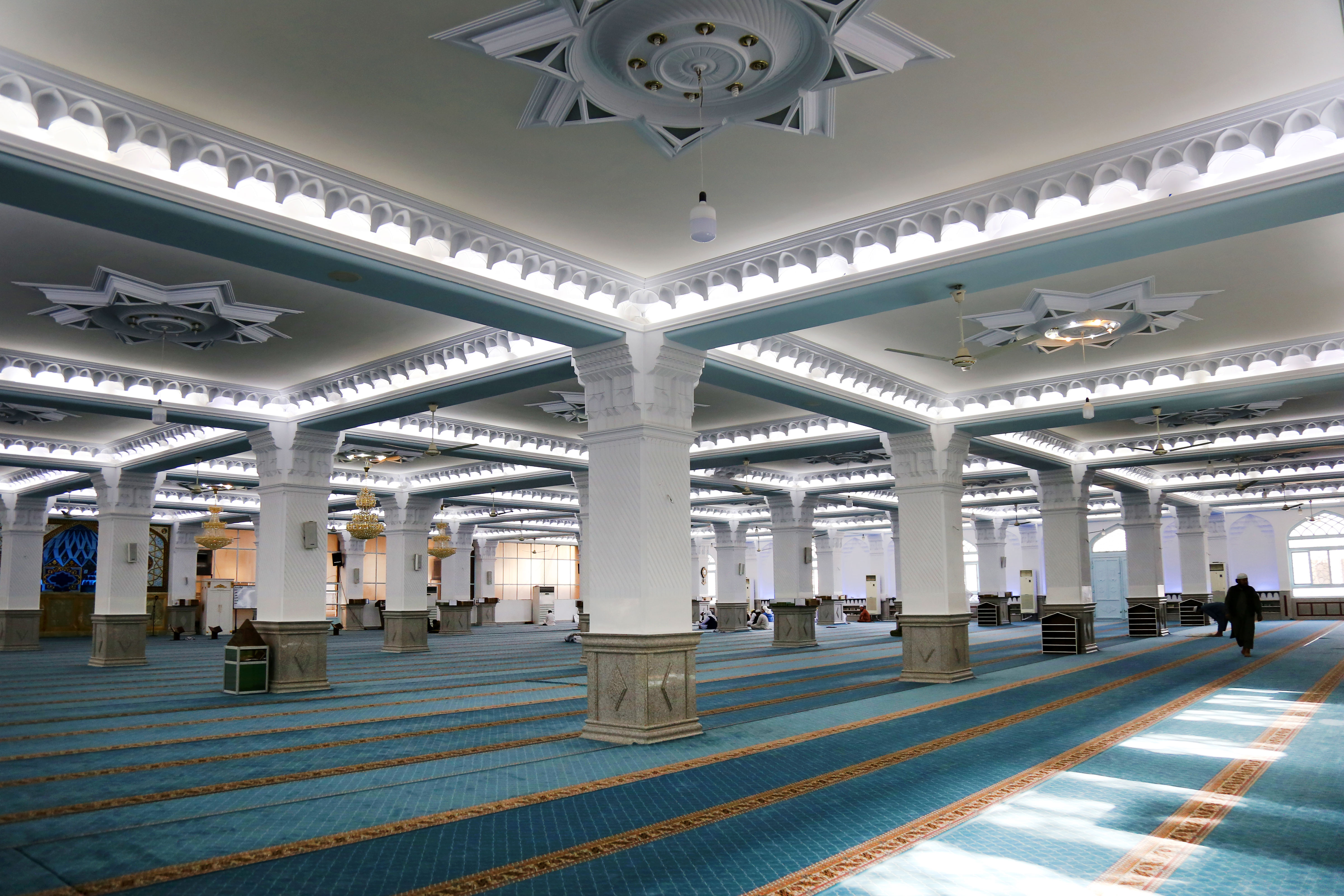

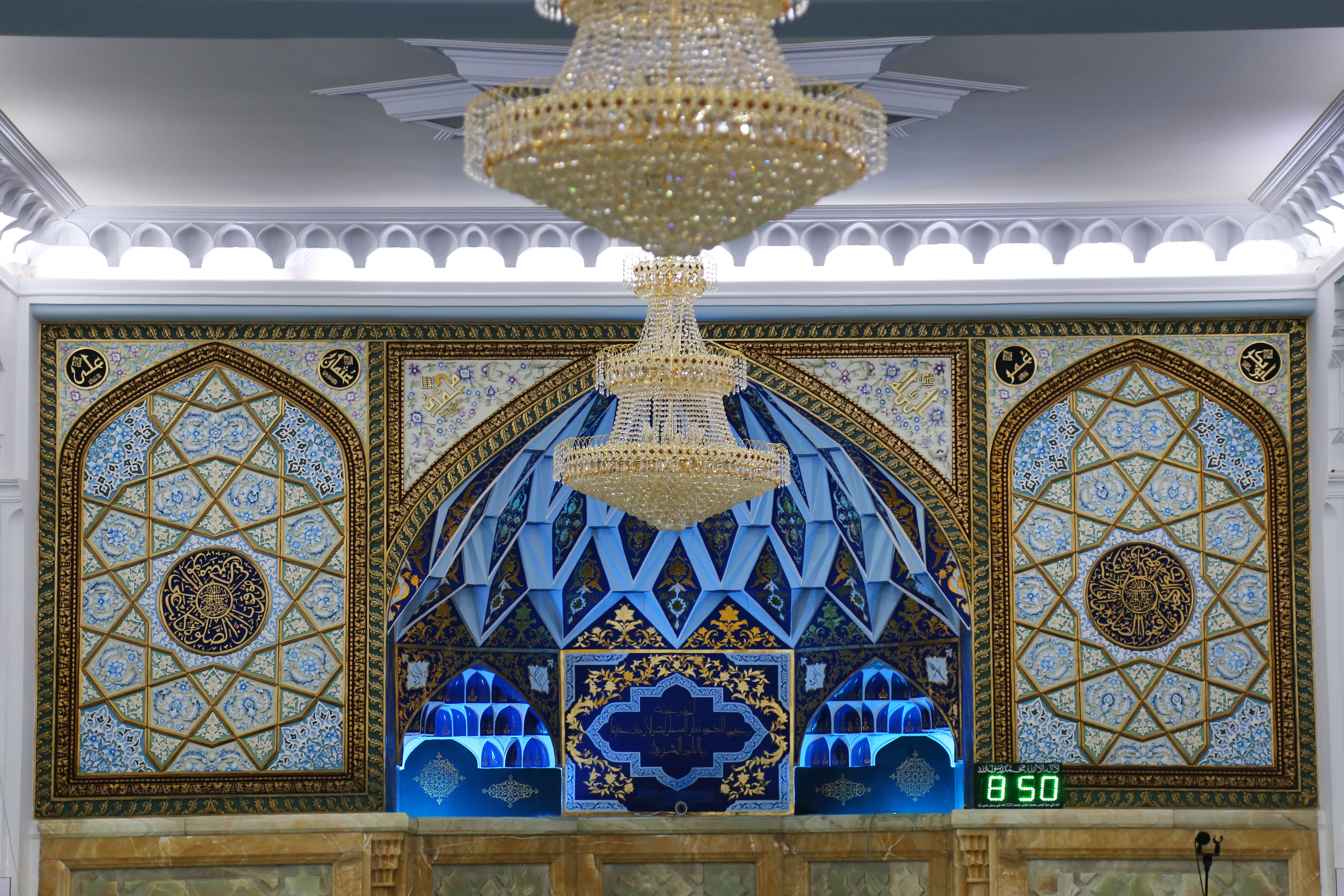

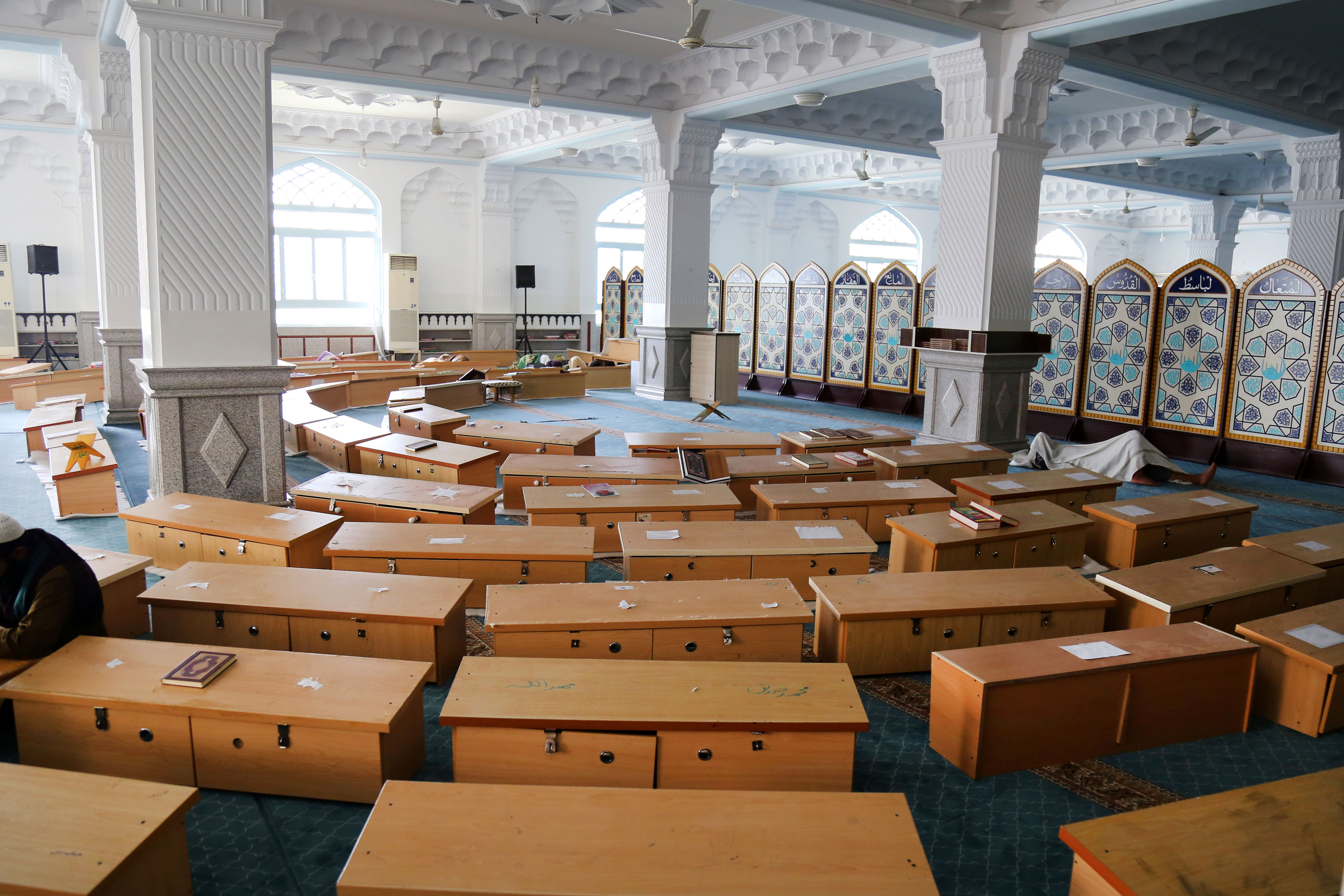

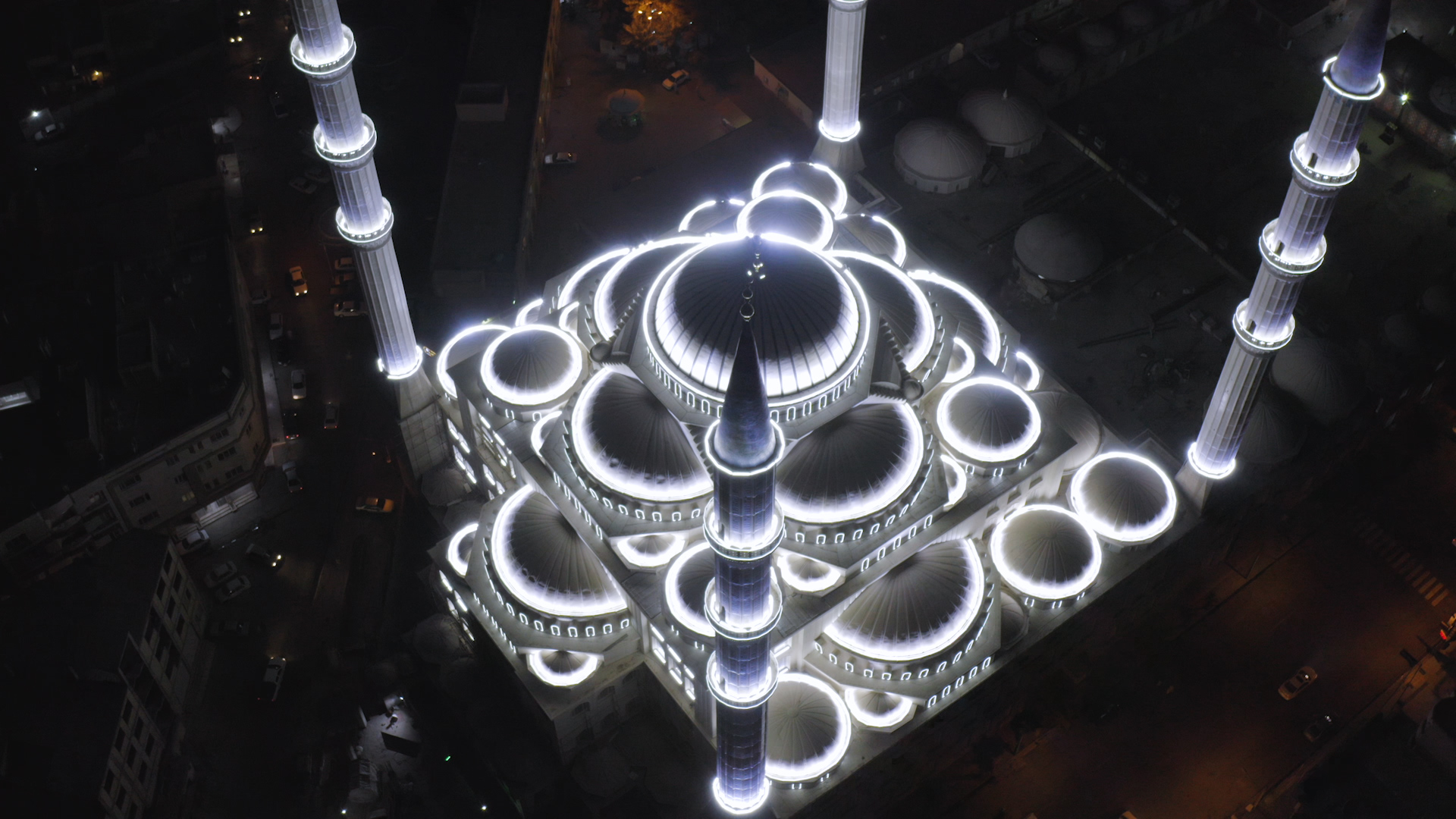

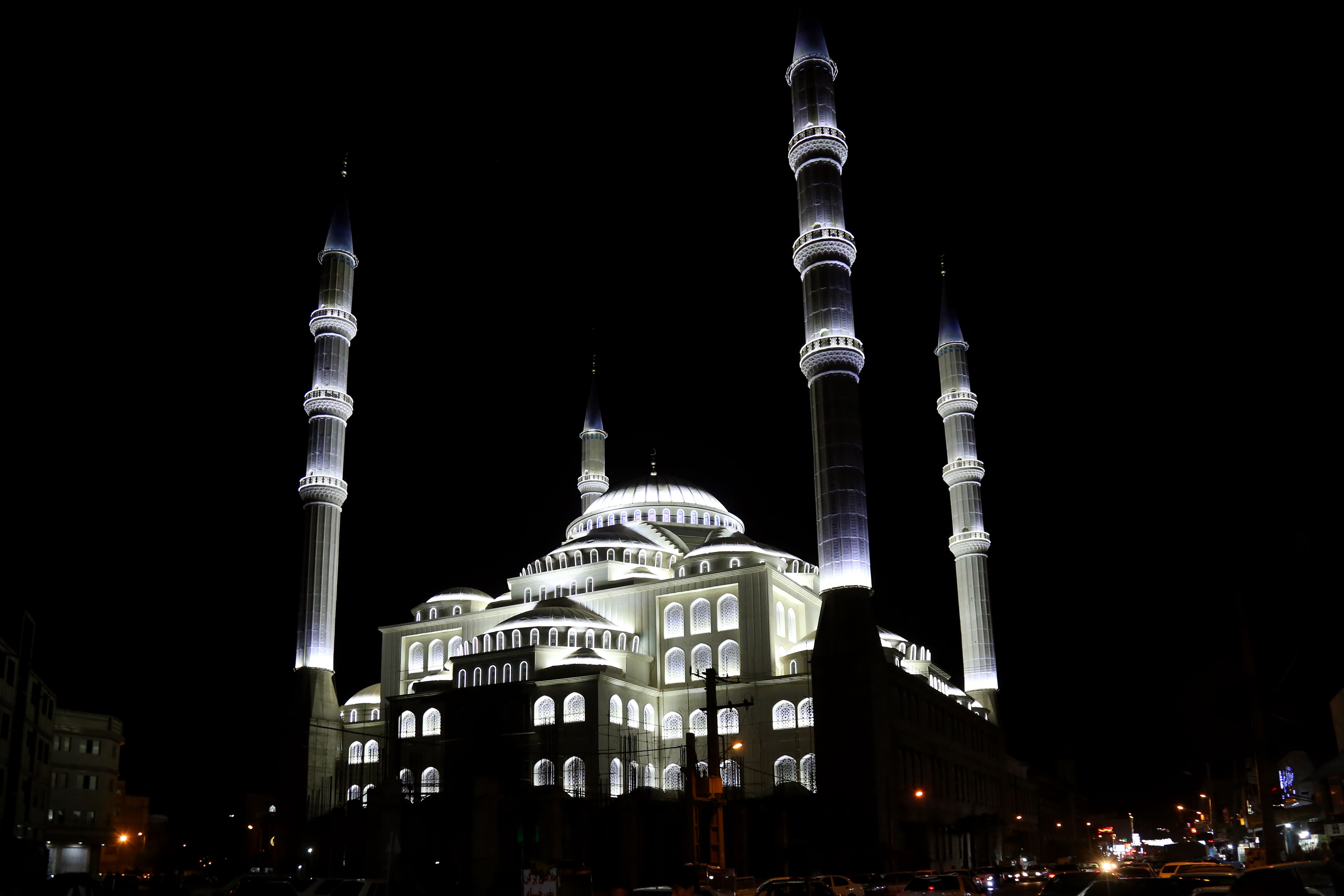

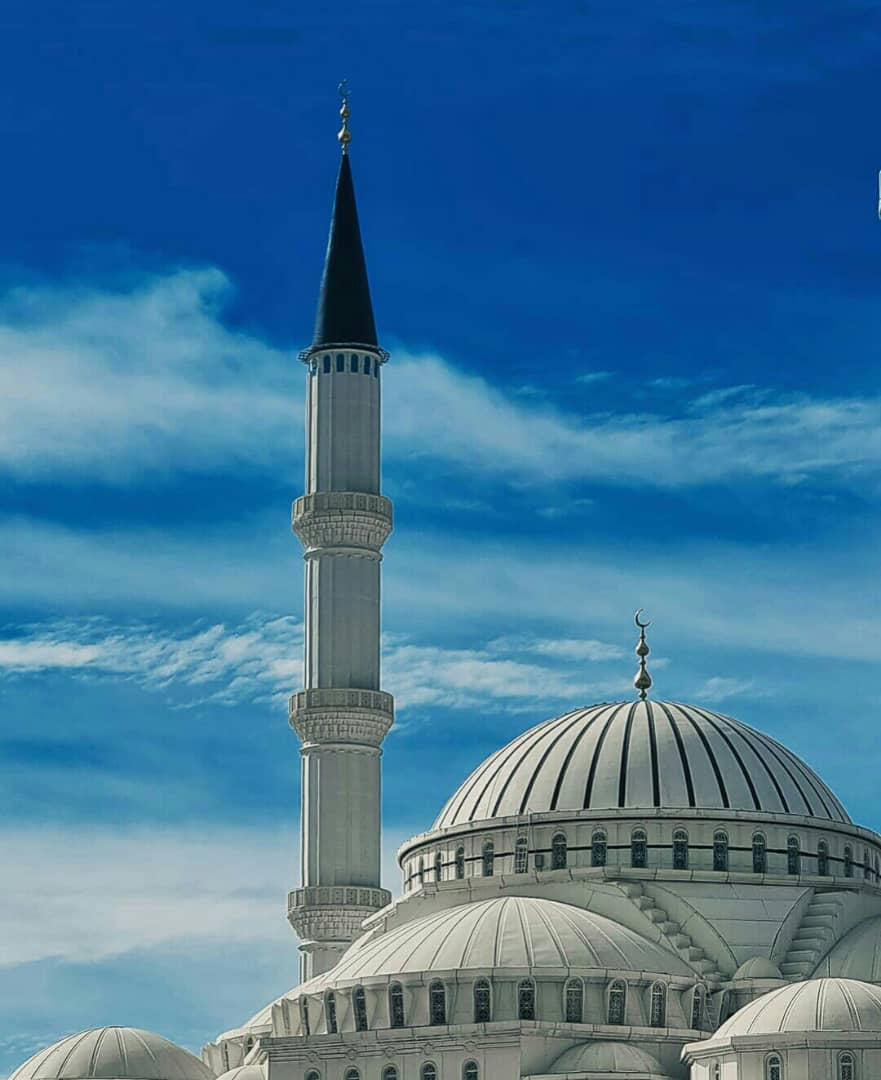

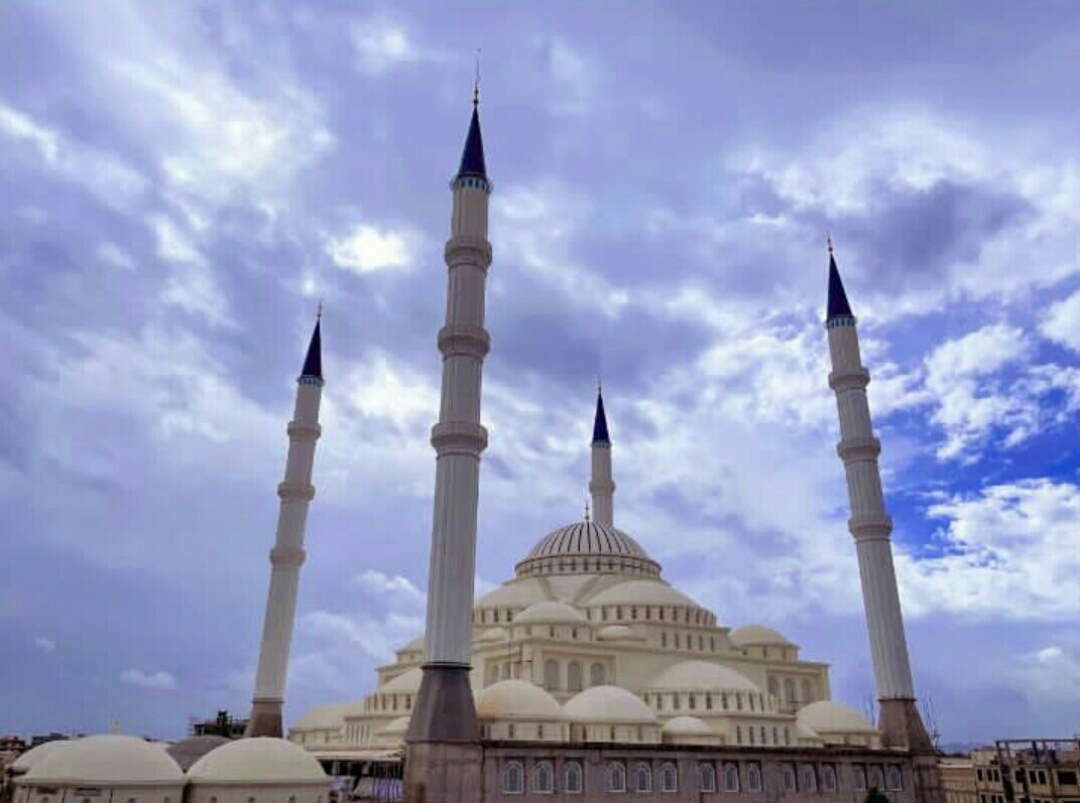

== See also ==
- Sunni Islam in Iran
- List of mosques in Iran
- List of largest mosques
- Deobandi movement in Iran
