= Progressivism in Iran =

Progressivism in Iran refers to a broad range of political, intellectual, and social movements advocating social reform, modernization, social justice, and expanded political and social rights. Its roots can be traced to nineteenth-century reformist thought and the Constitutional Revolution of 1905–1911, when reformers promoted representative government, the rule of law, social justice, modern education, and limits on arbitrary political power.

Progressive currents subsequently developed through social democracy, women's rights activism, nationalist and social-reform movements, and religious and secular responses to modernity. The women's rights movement became an important force for democratic change, advocating expanded access to education, employment, political participation, and legal equality.

Following the Iranian Revolution of 1979, progressive trends included Islamic reformism, democratic and civil society activism, women's-rights campaigns, and movements seeking political and legal reform. These developments have differed in their approaches to religion, democracy, economic policy, and social reform.

== Historical development ==
The intellectual origins of progressive politics in Iran can be traced to the reformist developments that emerged during the late 19th century and culminated in the Constitutional Revolution of 1905–1911. Reformers sought to replace arbitrary rule with constitutional government, representative institutions, modern education, and social and economic reform. The Constitutional movement also brought together diverse political trends, including liberal constitutionalists, nationalists, and social democrats.

The constitutional period also saw the emergence of competing political developments, including liberals, nationalists, and social democrats. Social Democratic organizations advocated measures including land redistribution, protection of poorer sections of society, separation of religion from politics, and economic reforms. These developments formed part of a wider process of intellectual modernization in which Iranian political thought increasingly engaged with nationalism, socialism, constitutionalism, and other international political ideas.

Women's rights activism also emerged as an important component of Iran's reformist and democratic development. Women's organizations and activists advocated modern education, greater participation in public life, employment opportunities, political representation, and reform of marriage and family laws. The movement was closely connected with the liberal, nationalist, social-democratic, and other reformist currents that developed around the Constitutional Revolution and subsequently became an enduring element of Iranian political and social activism.

A major nationalist and democratic current emerged after the Second World War around Mohammad Mosaddegh and the National Front. Founded in 1949, the National Front was a broad coalition whose principal objectives included the nationalization of Iran's oil industry and democratization of the political system.

Following the 1979 Revolution, progressive political currents developed within the new Islamic Republic as well as outside its governing institutions. They included secular democratic and nationalist groups, the Freedom Movement of Iran, women's-rights activists, and religious reformers who sought to reconcile Islamic thought with constitutional government, political participation, and civil rights. The Green Movement that emerged after the disputed 2009 Iranian presidential election marked another major development in Iran's modern democratic opposition. In 2022, the Woman, Life, Freedom movement marked a further development in Iranian progressive and reformist activism. The nationwide movement began after the death in custody of Mahsa Amini.

=== Reform movement ===
A major reformist current emerged in the Islamic Republic during the 1990s. New political and social groups developed interpretations of Islam and politics that emphasized greater political participation, representation, and reform of state institutions. These shifts contributed to the emergence of the Second Khordad Movement following the election of Mohammad Khatami as president in 1997.

Khatami's political program emphasized the rule of law, civil society, accountability, moderation, and the protection of constitutional civil liberties. Reformist candidates subsequently achieved victories in the 1999 municipal elections and the 2000 parliamentary elections.

The reform movement also promoted greater participation by women and the development of civil society institutions. During the reform period, women's-rights advocates became prominent among reformist political and social activists, while campaigns such as the One Million Signatures campaign sought changes to laws regarded by their organizers as discriminatory against women.

The reform movement faced institutional and political constraints, and its influence declined during Khatami's second term. The movement nevertheless became an important expression of demands for political participation, civil society, and institutional reform within the Islamic Republic.

== Prominent thinkers and political figures ==
A number of Iranian thinkers, writers, activists, and political figures contributed progressive movements in Iran.

=== Reformist and constitutional thinkers ===
Mirza Malkom Khan (1833–1908) was a reformist writer whose works popularized concepts including constitutional government, codified law, political consultation, national representation, and the rights of citizens.

Ali-Akbar Dehkhoda (1879–1956) was a writer, intellectual, and political activist associated with the Constitutional Revolution. Through his journalism he criticized political corruption, authoritarianism, and the conservative religious establishment and promoted political and social reform.

Ahmad Kasravi (1890–1946) was a historian who criticized superstition and aspects of established religious authority. His reformist writings formed part of a broader current of secular and social criticism that developed in Iran following the Constitutional Revolution.

=== Nationalist and social-democratic figures ===
Mohammad Mosaddegh (1882–1967) was a politician and leader of the National Front. His political program combined Iranian nationalism, parliamentary politics, and the nationalization of the country's oil industry. He also advocated free elections and, during his premiership, maintained relatively broad freedom of speech and press compared with the subsequent political order.

=== Religious and democratic reformers ===
Mehdi Bazargan (1907–1995) was an engineer, politician, and religious intellectual who combined Islamic thought with support for constitutional government and political participation. He founded the Freedom Movement of Iran and became an important figure in the development of democratic and reformist politics in the 20th century.

Ali Shariati (1933–1977) was a sociologist and religious intellectual whose sought to reinterpret Shi'a Islam in relation to social justice, political activism, and resistance to established forms of authority. His ideas had a substantial influence on politically engaged religious intellectuals and activists before the Iranian Revolution.

== Major political groups and movements ==
A number of political parties and organizations have contributed to the development of progressive political thought in Iran. They represented different and sometimes competing ideologies, including constitutionalism, social democracy, nationalism, religious reformism, communism, feminism, and democratic reform.

=== Social-democratic movements ===
The Democratic Party (Persia) adopted a parliamentary and nationalist program, while continuing to advocate political and social reform, separation of religion from politics, and protection of peasants.

=== Left-wing movements ===
The Tudeh Party of Iran was founded in 1941 by former political prisoners and intellectuals. In its early years, the party adopted a populist and democratic ideologies that included labor legislation and political rights for women. After the Iranian Revolution, the organization initially supported the Islamic Republic, but its leadership was arrested and the organization was suppressed in 1983.

The People's Mujahedin Organization of Iran, which was founded in the 1960s, became an exile-based opposition organization and developed a political program centered on secularism, democracy, and gender equality. The group's ideology has been shaped by revolutionary and reformist Islamic philosophy, particularly through a reinterpretation of Shia Islam and the influence of Ali Shariati.

The Iranian Green Movement emerged following the disputed 2009 Iranian presidential election and was closely connected to the reformist political current. It mobilized large demonstrations around demands concerning electoral accountability and political rights.

=== Women's rights movements ===
Iran's Iranian women's rights movement has been an important component of progressive political activism since the Constitutional Revolution. Women's organizations and activists have campaigned for access to education, political participation, employment, legal equality, and changes to discriminatory laws.

The Woman, Life, Freedom movement that emerged in 2022 and was sparked by the death of Mahsa Amini, brought together protests concerning women's rights, political freedom, and opposition to authoritarian rule.
