= 1979 Iranian local elections =

Iranian politics

City and Village Councils elections
← 1976	October 1979	1999 →

In October 1979, Ministry of Interior held elections for local councils in 150 cities along with elections coordinated and overseen for councils in thousands of villages and nomadic communities. It was a move to address the importance of the local councils raised by the revolutionaries and to replace the councils with those existing since the Pahlavi dynasty.

Kian Tajbakhsh argues that the councils were put on hold on fears of separatist aspirations, mainly because of eruptions of armed conflict in the provinces amidst Iran–Iraq War.

According to Wilfried Buchta, in Kurdish and Turkmen regions the councils were "dominated by secular left-wing groups, wielded considerable influence both at the municipal and at the village level".

In Zahedan, the clerical and regionalist Muslim Union Party (hezb-e ettehad al-Moslemin) led by Abdulaziz Mullazadeh that advocated more representation of Baluch people in the central government, played an active role in the campaigns and fueled the tensions between Sunni and Shia communities despite boycotting the election. The majority of the seats were won by non-Baluch candidates and on 12 October 1979 ethnic unrest occurred in the city, before the result was annulled.
