= Abdolhamid Ismaeelzahi =

Iranian Sunni cleric

Shaykh al-Islām Molavi Abdolhamid
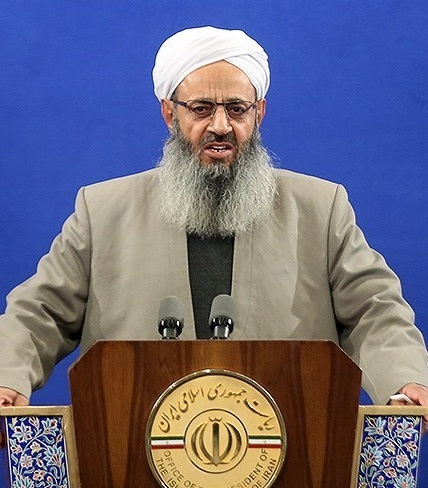
- Abdolhamid in 2014
- Official name: Abdolhamid

Personal life
- Born: Abdolhamid Ismaeelzahi c. 1946 or 1947 (age 78–79) Galugah, Zahedan County, Imperial State of Iran
- Region: Baluchistan
- Education: PhD
- Other name: Sheikh Islam
- Occupation: Imam, Khatib
- Website: http://abdolhamid.net/

Religious life
- Religion: Islam
- Denomination: Sunni
- Jurisprudence: Hanafi
- Movement: Deobandi

Abdolhamid Ismaeelzahi (Persian: عبدالحمید اسماعیل‌زهی; born 1946/1947) is an Iranian Sunni Muslim Deobandi cleric who is regarded as a "spiritual leader for Iran’s Sunni Muslim population" though his influence is limited to the Baloch population, according to Reuters. Ismaeelzahi, a Baloch, enjoys support of the overwhelming majority of Baloch people in Iran, who hail him as their Molavi.

He is the imam of the Makki Mosque in Zahedan and the director of the Jamiah Darul Uloom Zahedan, the main seminary in the city.

== Views ==
Ismaeelzahi is a vocal critic of the status of freedom of religion in Iran and an advocate of nonviolence. He has stated that capital punishment is "not suitable" and should be "used only when there are no other alternatives".

On 2 August 2017, he sent a letter to Ali Khamenei addressing concerns over the "issue of religious discrimination in Iran", which was publicly replied to.

== Relations with Taliban ==
Ismaeelzahi traveled to Chabahar on 25 November 2013, and told the directors of religious schools in Sistan and Baluchistan:

All these groups are not takfiris. For example, the Taliban group is not takfiri. The differences that we have with the method of their functions will remain, but this group is not takfiri.

In 2020, Ismaeelzahi issued a statement and considered the signing of the peace agreement between the "Afghan Taliban Movement" and the "American Government" as "a great success of the present era" and an example of "the victory of right over wrong".

In August 2021, Ismaeelzahi said that the vast advances of the Taliban in Afghanistan are the result of God's help and the people's support for them, and the goal of the Taliban is to implement the Islamic law and the way of the Prophet and the decree of God.

== Travel restrictions ==
Ismaeelzahi is under alleged travel restrictions imposed by the government. In July 2014, he was barred from leaving the country. In 2017, it was reported that the restriction was intensified, barring him from any travel except to Tehran. However, in December 2018, he was allowed to visit Muscat, Oman to meet the Balochi minority living there.

== Accolades ==
- Defenders of Human Rights Center's Activist of the Year (2013)

== See also ==
- Deobandi movement in Iran
- List of Deobandis
