= 1999 Iranian local elections =

City and Village Councils elections
- 26 February 1999

≈200,000 Seats in City and Village Councils
- Registered: 36,739,982
- Turnout: 64.42%
Alliance	2nd of Khordad	Right wing
Major cities	579 / 815 (71%)	119 / 815 (15%)

The elections for City and Village Councils of Iran were held on 26 February 1999, for the first time in the history of the Islamic Republic of Iran to elect some 200,000 seats. Though many sources consider the elections the first local elections since the Iranian Revolution, two decade earlier 1979 local elections took place in a more limited scope.

These elections saw great levels of public participation and civic engagement and still tend to be viewed as an "historic moment" and important opportunity for citizens to play an active part in the management of their municipalities at a local level.

In many large cities, especially Tehran and Isfahan, candidates from 2nd of Khordad movement won the elections. Independents were elected in most rural areas, reflecting concern for local issues which competed with the wider national debate over an emerging “civil society.”

The elections marked an unprecedented presence of women in politics of Iran, 114 women won first or second place in 109 cities.

There were 23,668,739 votes cast in this election.

== Results ==
City	2nd of Khordad	Right wing	Independents	Ref
Ahvaz	4 / 9 (44%)	0 / 9 (0%)	5 / 9 (56%)	
Hamedan	0 / 9 (0%)	0 / 9 (0%)	9 / 9 (100%)	
Isfahan	8 / 11 (73%)	2 / 11 (18%)	1 / 11 (9%)	
Isfahan	8 / 11 (73%)	—N/a		
Isfahan	7 / 11 (64%)	—N/a		
Tabriz	8 / 11 (73%)	—N/a		
Kermanshah	4 / 9 (44%)	0 / 9 (0%)	5 / 9 (56%)	
Mashhad	4 / 11 (36%)	5 / 11 (45%)	2 / 11 (18%)	
Mashhad	6 / 11 (55%)	—N/a		
Qom	0 / 9 (0%)	9 / 9 (100%)	0 / 9 (0%)	
Qom	—N/a	8 / 9 (89%)	—N/a	
Sari	4 / 9 (44%)	0 / 9 (0%)	5 / 9 (56%)	
Shiraz	6 / 11 (55%)	0 / 11 (0%)	5 / 11 (45%)	
Shiraz	8 / 11 (73%)	—N/a		
Tehran	14 / 15 (93%)	0 / 15 (0%)	1 / 15 (7%)	
Zahedan	4 / 9 (44%)	0 / 9 (0%)	5 / 9 (56%)	
Khomein	5 / 5 (100%)	0 / 5 (0%)	0 / 5 (0%)	
Najafabad	7 / 7 (100%)	0 / 7 (0%)	0 / 7 (0%)	
Total	579 / 815 (71%)	119 / 815 (15%)	117 / 815 (14%)	
Total	331 / 665 (50%)	82 / 665 (12%)	—N/a	
