= Deoband–Aligarh relations =

Relationship between Deobandi and Aligarh Movements

The Deoband–Aligarh relations refers to the historical and ideological tensions that existed between the Deobandi and Aligarh movements in British India during the late 19th and early 20th centuries.

Darul Uloom Deoband and Aligarh Muslim University are two influential Islamic educational institutions in India that have played significant roles in the country's history. Darul Uloom Deoband is a conservative Sunni Islamic seminary that was founded in 1866 and has focused on traditional Islamic learning and the promotion of Islamic values and practices. Aligarh Muslim University, primarily Muhammadan Anglo-Oriental College, on the other hand, is a modernist Islamic institution that was founded in 1875 and has focused on modern education and the promotion of rationalism, science, and social reform. The relationship between Deoband and Aligarh has been complex and has often been marked by tensions and disagreements.

The Deobandi movement was a traditionalist Islamic movement that sought to preserve and promote Islamic knowledge and practices, while the Aligarh movement was a more liberal and modernist movement that sought to promote Western-style education and social reform. The tensions between the two movements arose from their differing visions of the role of Islam in Indian society. The Deobandis were opposed to Western-style education and sought to preserve traditional Islamic knowledge and practices, while the Aligarh movement embraced Western education and sought to modernise and reform Indian society. Deoband has been critical of Aligarh's emphasis on modern education and has accused it of promoting Western values and undermining traditional Islamic values. Aligarh, in turn, has criticised Deoband's conservatism and resistance to change, seeing it as an obstacle to progress and modernisation.

Despite their differences, both movements played a significant role in the development of Islamic thought and culture in India. The Deoband movement was instrumental in the spread of Islamic knowledge and education, and played a key role in the development of Islamic scholarship and institutions in India. The Aligarh movement, on the other hand, was influential in the development of a modern and secular Muslim identity in India, and played a significant role in the political and cultural life of the country.

Over time, the tensions between the two movements began to subside, and many scholars and intellectuals began to bridge the gap between the traditionalist and modernist schools of thought. Today, both the Deoband and Aligarh movements continue to play important roles in the intellectual and cultural life of the Muslim world, and their legacy continues to shape the development of Islamic thought and practice.

== History ==
=== Aligarh Movement ===
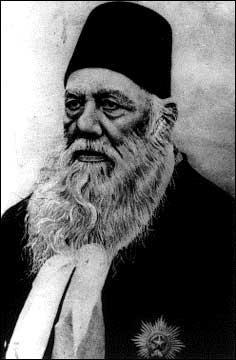
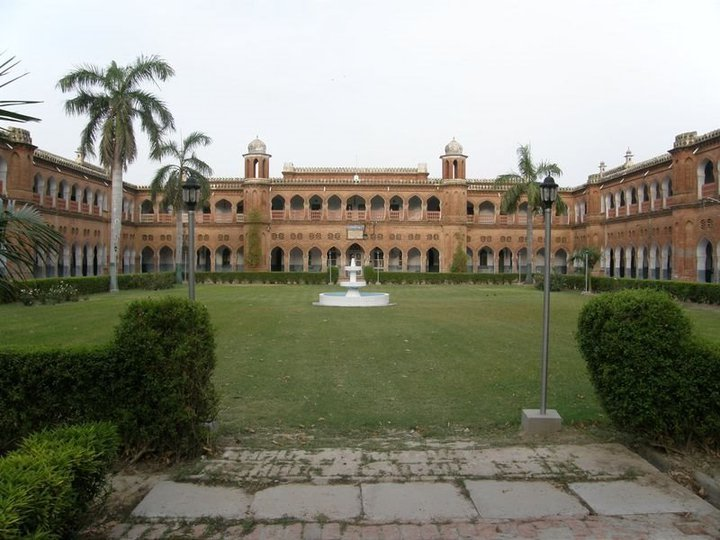
Syed Ahmad Khan & Aligarh Muslim University

After Indian Rebellion of 1857, Britain captured all of India. Syed Ahmad Khan was a government employee at that time. He cannot see British behaviour towards his nation. On the other hand, Muslims also do not want to shake hand with the British. Syed Ahmad Khan wrote booklet Reasons of Indian Revolt just for overcome the tension among Muslims and the British. Syed Ahmad Khan contemplated that Muslims have just a way of negotiations with the Britishers and their educational system regarding leaving their backwardness. Syed Ahmad affirmed that British educational system have so many faults that if it was adopted over all then national identity and Islamic civilisation will be destroyed in all over the India. He started Aligarh movement just to save Islamic identity along getting benefits from western educational system. Aligarh College was established for this purpose, because Syed Ahmad wanted to make its status like Oxford and Cambridge. In fact, there were several reasons of initiating Aligarh school of thought. For escaping Muslims from the drawbacks of British educational system and adopting its good attributes, Syed Ahmad took several steps which are considered to be a part of Aligarh movement under his ideology. Reasons of Aligarh movement are as follows:

1. After annihilating in 1857 war, and facing crucial behaviour of the British, Muslims had realised that there is no way except co-operation with the British, because they are not so strong militarily like them. Aligarh College was the first motive regarding adopting this approach.
2. The British had got Hindus co-operation and both wanted to devalue Muslims in Indian economy. Syed Ahmad realised that only modern education can help Muslims get a strong financial position. This thinking also became a reason of starting Aligarh Movement.
3. Hindus, after assimilating modern professional education, had got a status of literate nation, and now they had to get government jobs. Syed Ahmad was feeling that if this routine will remain continue then a day will not far away when India will be led by Hindus. So, this was also a motive to start Aligarh movement.
4. After 1857, all the educational institutes were under the control of British government. So, there was an avid of independent Muslim institution which can protect Muslim civilisation and identity. Therefore, Aligarh College established.
5. British educational system was an effort to destroy Muslims culture. Therefore, Muslims were forced to keep far away their children from such schools.
6. The way of teaching in government schools was in English language that was difficult to understand by unvaried Muslim students. Therefore, there was a need of such educational institute where Muslims can feel comfortable regarding getting education.
7. Government schools were using for preaching of Christianity, and also syllabus was against Muslims history and culture. Even religious education was prohibited but Christianity was preached in schools openly. Therefore, Muslims avoided sending their children in such schools.

=== Deobandi movement ===
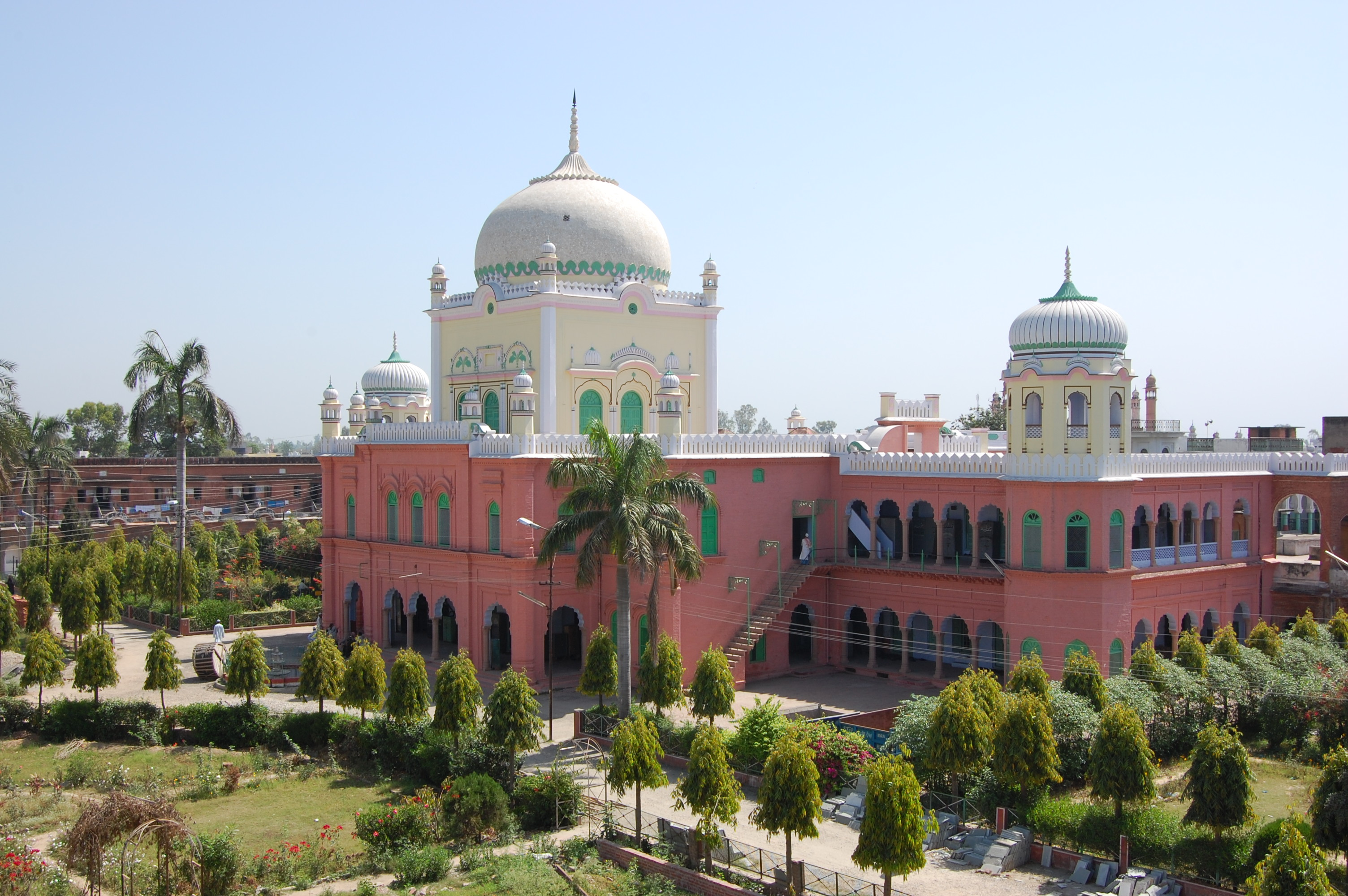
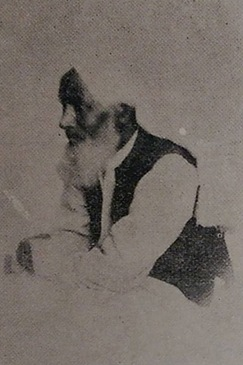
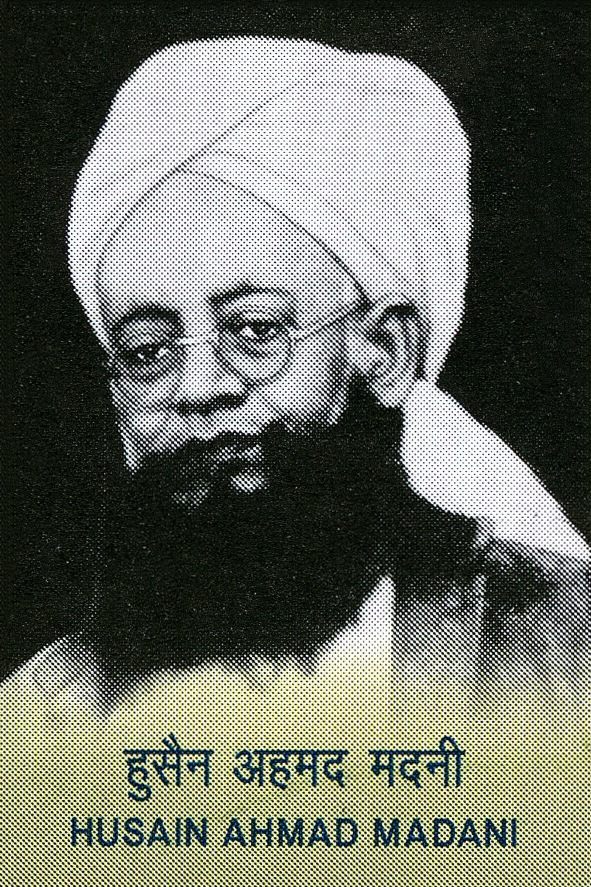
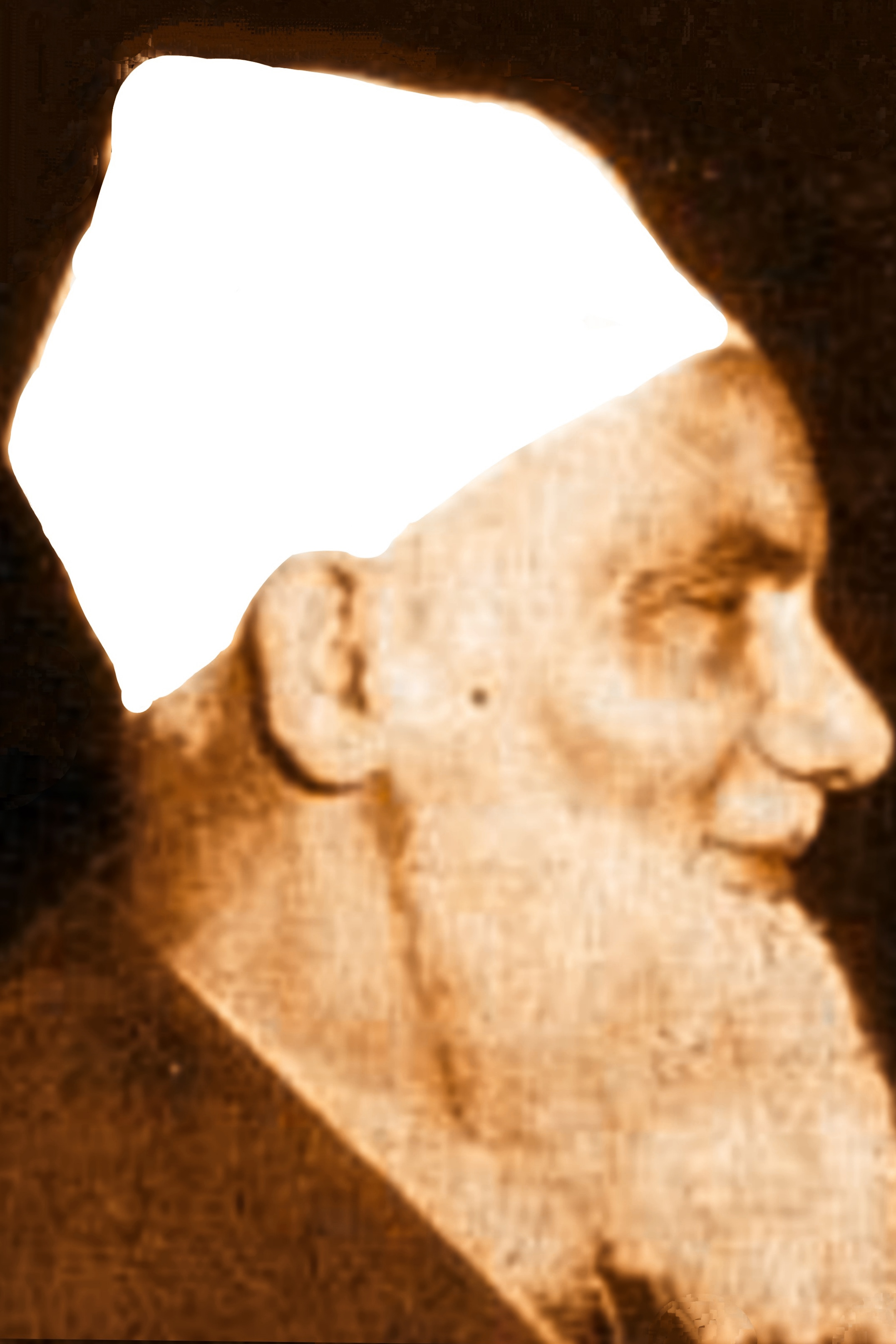
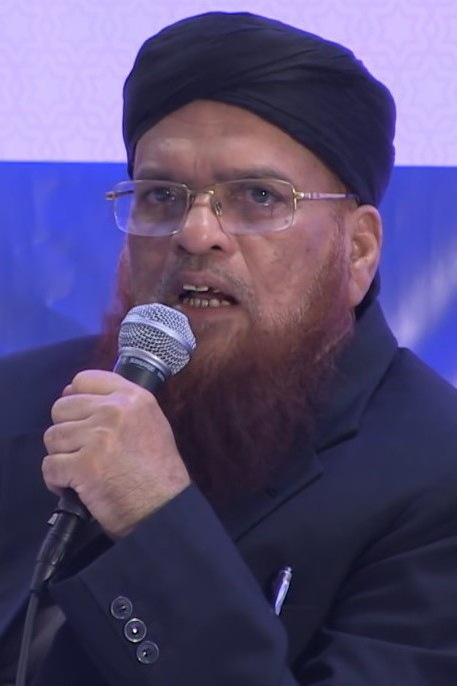
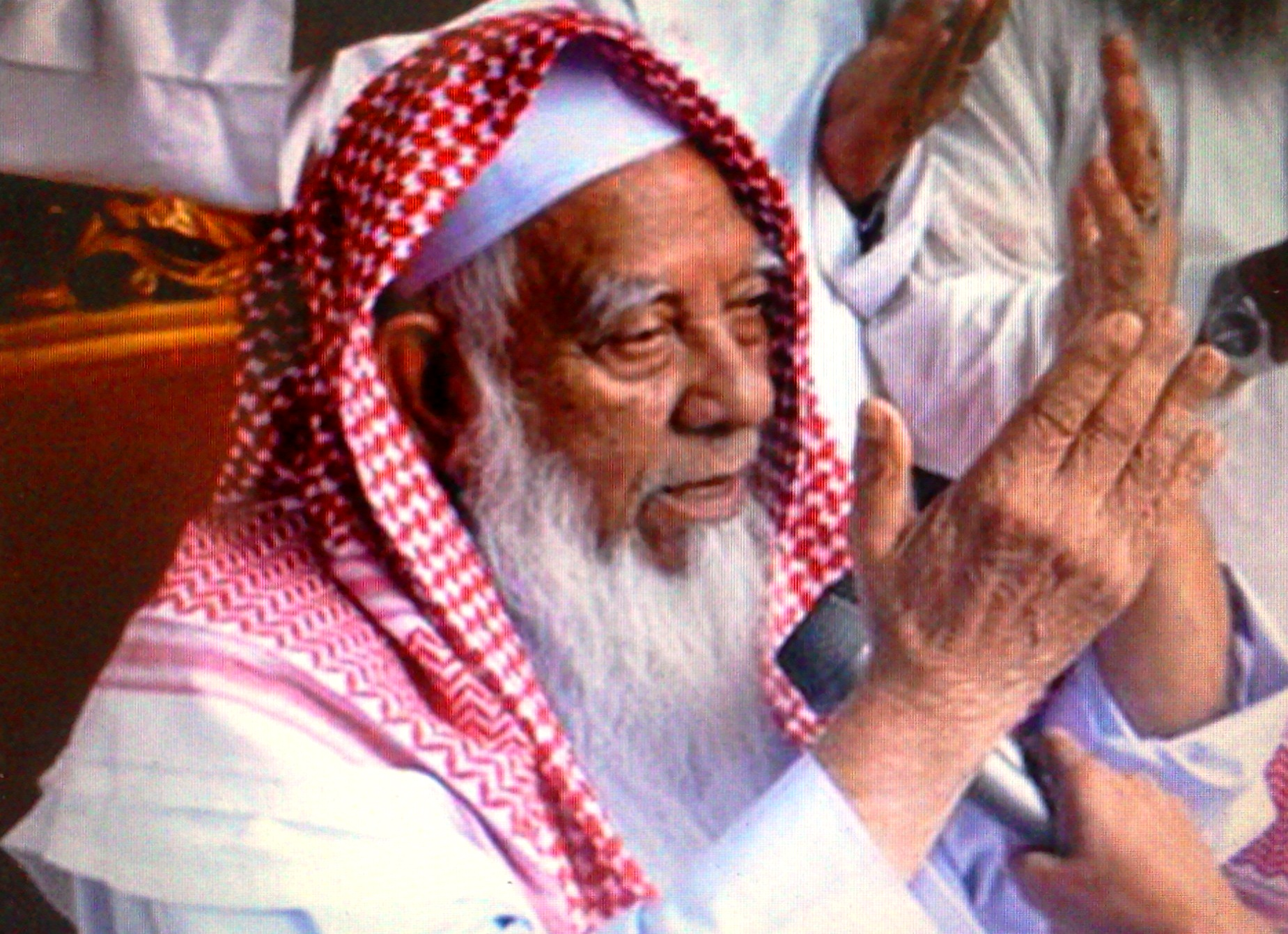
Clockwise from top: Darul Uloom Deoband, Hussain Ahmad Madani, Taqi Usmani, Shah Ahmad Shafi, Shabbir Ahmad Usmani, Mahmud Hasan Deobandi

Due to British educational policies against Islam and Muslim identity, it was felt intensely to protect the Islamic values and education. For this purpose, Muhammad Qasim Nanautavi opened a little madrasa in Deoband, Saharanpur district. He was a pupil of Mamluk Ali Nanautawi who was a student of Shah Waliullah Dehlawi. Therefore, Darul Uloom Deoband became a reason of revival of Shah Wali-Ullah's thoughts. This institute was non-align from the funding of British government. Even it does not accept funded of those Muslims who were westernise in their thinking. This institution is still running since 1866, which generated great Muslim philosophers like Mahmud Hasan Deobandi, Ubaidullah Sindhi, Shabbir Ahmad Usmani, Ilyas Kandhlawi, Hussain Ahmad Madani and Ashraf Ali Thanwi. The reasons of Deoband movement under the ideology of this school of thought were as follows:

1. Its basic objective was to restore Islamic education which had been almost destroyed by the British government through policies regarding closings of Muslims religious institutions.
2. As government was supporting preaching of Christianity, it was an intense need of that time to preach an actual shape of Islam.
3. As British educational system was motivating Indian Muslims towards materialism, this movement was started to socialise spiritually.
4. British government and Hindus were trying that time to create differences among Muslims, and they were funding to generate different sects among Muslims. This movement was an effort to unite Muslims under their pure identification of Muslim.
5. To eliminating impacts of Western civilisation through new inducted educational system by British government, this movement played vital role.

== Impact ==
=== Pakistan ===
Both Aligarh and Deoband movements left considerable socio-political impacts on Pakistani society. Before the independence of Pakistan, the movements shared a similar goal of achieving a free homeland for the Muslims of the Subcontinent. After 1947, the differences between the two movements have become more evident, especially after the September 11 attacks.

Aligarh School of Thought gave a modern direction to the new generation in a sense that they got theocratic knowledge at new patterns. There was a relationship between religion and science. Syed Ahmad Khan's work "Ilmul-kalaam" which is also called "New Theology" or "Islamic Modernisation" changed the way of thinking in the Muslims of Subcontinent. Pakistan got independence but this school of thought left an inspired group which is still working on that rational approach that was introduced by the Syed Ahmed Khan. There is some analysis about socio-political impacts of Aligarh School of Thought on Pakistan society that can be entitled as:

1. This movement developed the trends of getting western knowledge.
2. Western knowledge became a reason of getting strong financial status.
3. Although students of Aligarh were spoken Urdu language and they developed the trends of speaking Urdu language. So, Urdu language became a symbol of elite class language.
4. The basic theme of Aligarh movement was to infuse morals and manners in the Muslims of Subcontinent and after independence of Pakistan, the followers of Aligarh School of Thought were shown their specific look and manners and that had been considered idealism among Pakistani society.
5. The slandered of civilised nation have been changed in getting Islamic as well as modern western knowledge rather than the adopting militant attitude after getting religious education from traditional madrassas of rigid mind-set.
6. Modern education was considered as an essential with the religious education.
7. The concept of rationality and Ijtehad became very popular and people found the solution of their modern socio-religious problems in the teaching of Islam under following this concept.
8. The patterns of cultural conservatism were gone towards liberalisation.

On the other hand, population inspired by Deoband School of Thought is almost consisted upon 65 percent of total. Their major desire and demand is to make the Pakistan a theocratic Islamic state. Since 1947, its role in the society is most dominant. From the presentation of Objective Resolution in 1949 to the movement against Ahmadiyya community in 1970s and from anti-Shia sectarian movement in the decades of 1980 and 1990 to the militant struggle in Kashmir and Afghanistan, this school of thought participated a lot. Several organisations like Lashkar-e-Jhangvi, Sipah-e-Sahaba Pakistan, Jaish-e-Mohammed and Harkat-ul-Mujahideen which have been declared as terrorist organisations from the Government of Pakistan, are belonged to this ideology. Similarly, in July 2007, Siege of Lal Masjid became a big challenge for Pakistani government. According to the survey report of 1988, Deoband School of thought has deep roots in the society. There were 590 Deobandi institutions in Punjab. While the ratio of other sectarian institutions was very low. In Sindh, there were 208 Deobandi institutions, 278 Deobandi institutions were in Balochistan. Similarly, 51 Deobandi institutions were in Azad Kashmir. In Islamabad, the capital of Pakistan, Deobandi institutions were 22. In Gilgit-Baltistan (Northern areas of Pakistan), Deobandi institutions were 60. But in Khyber Pakhtunkhwa (NWFP), the number of Deoband institutions was very high. There were 631 Deoband institutions. So, according to this survey, there were 1840 Deobandi institutions in all over the Pakistan in 1988 that covering huge mind-set of Pakistani society. During analyses the socio-political impacts of this school of thought can be entitled as:

1. Westernisation and modernisation is un-Islamic.
2. Only religious education must be study in educational institutions.
3. Method of teachings must be according to the teachings of Islam.
4. Modern education is a reason of un-Islamic attitude in the new generation.
5. The Jihad (Militant struggle) is only a source of Islamic orders implementation.
6. Women are not allowed to go out from her home without their blood relation.
