= Jamiah Darul Uloom Zahedan =

Sunni Islamic university in Iran

- دارالعلوم زاهدان
- Type: Islamic university
- Established: 1971
- Chancellor: Mawlana Abdul Hameed Ismaeelzahi
- Vice-Chancellor: Abdul Ghani Badri
- Academic staff: 65 (2011)
- Administrative staff: 90 (2011)
- Students: 1200+ (2011)
- Location: Zahedan, Sistan and Baluchestan, Iran
- Campus: Omar Khayyam Road

Jamiah Darul Uloom Zahedan (Persian: دارالعلوم زاهدان) is the largest and highest seat of Deobandi Sunni Muslims in Iran. The Jamiah was founded by Abdolazeez, son of Mojahid Sheikh Abdollah.

The Jamiah started its education activities in 1971 for the first time along with around 60 to 80 students and only 6 teachers in the new building of Darul Uloom on Khayyam Road. A number of students studying at Jamiah Darul Uloom Zahedan.

== Education pattern ==
The Jamiah has divided its education system into seven stages. These stages are given below along with years each stage requires:

- Primary Stage: two years
- Junior Stage: two years
- General Secondary Stage: two years
- Special Courses Stage: two years
- Higher Level (BA) Stage: four years
- Alameya (MA) Stage: two years
- Specialization in Fiqh (Islamic jurisprudence): two years

The total term of study besides having primary certificate of any government school, including two-year of specialization, is 16 years.

== Department and administrative divisions ==
The Jamiah has following departments and divisions:

Dar-ul-Iftaa, Specialization in Islamic Jurisprudence, Tafseer and Da'wah, Darulqadha and Tahkeem, Girls School, Hefz-e-Quran section, Tajweed section, Da'wat and guidance centre, Office for Students' Affairs, Central Library, Translation and Research Centre, Publication, Fiqh Academy of Ahlus-Sunnah, Institute of Arabic Language and Islamic Studies, Union of Islamic schools of Balochistan, SunniOnline Website, Medical Centre, Office for Islamic Institutes, etc.

Grand Makki Mosque in Zahedan, Iran, the largest mosque of the Sunnis in Iran situated next to the Seminary.

== Publication ==
The Jamiah is publishing the Neday Islam Magazine. The Jamiah has also published many articles.

== See also ==
- Deobandi movement in Iran
- List of Deobandi madrasas
