= Ahmad Naruyi =

Iranian Sunni Islamic scholar (1963–2014)

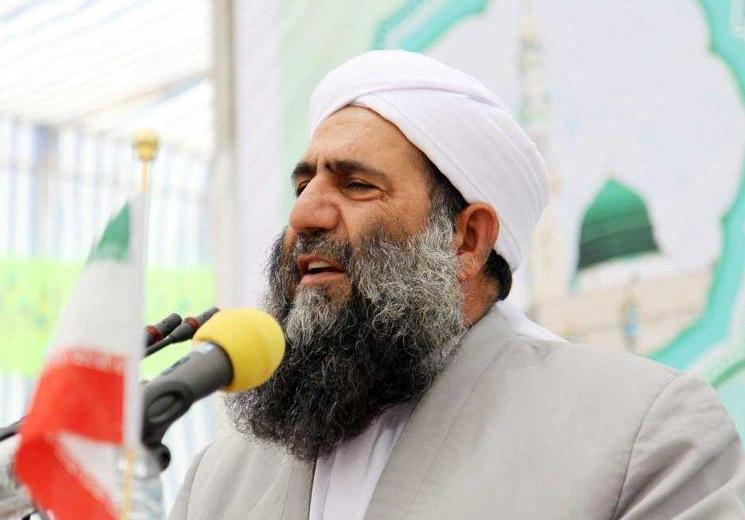
- Born: 1 March 1963; Zahedan, Iran
- Died: 18 March 2014 (aged 51); Zahedan, Iran

Ahmad Naruyi (Persian: احمد نارویی, romanized: Aḥmad Nārūyī; 1963 – 18 March 2014) was a notable Iranian Sunni theologian, human rights activist, journalist and a vice president of Zahedan seminary.

He was a prominent Sunni theologian and expert on Islamic jurisprudence. Ahmad Naruyi is also a social and human rights activist in Sistan and Baluchistan Province.
