= Kampong Melabau =

Village in Brunei

Kampong Melabau Kampung Melabau
- Neighbourhood and village
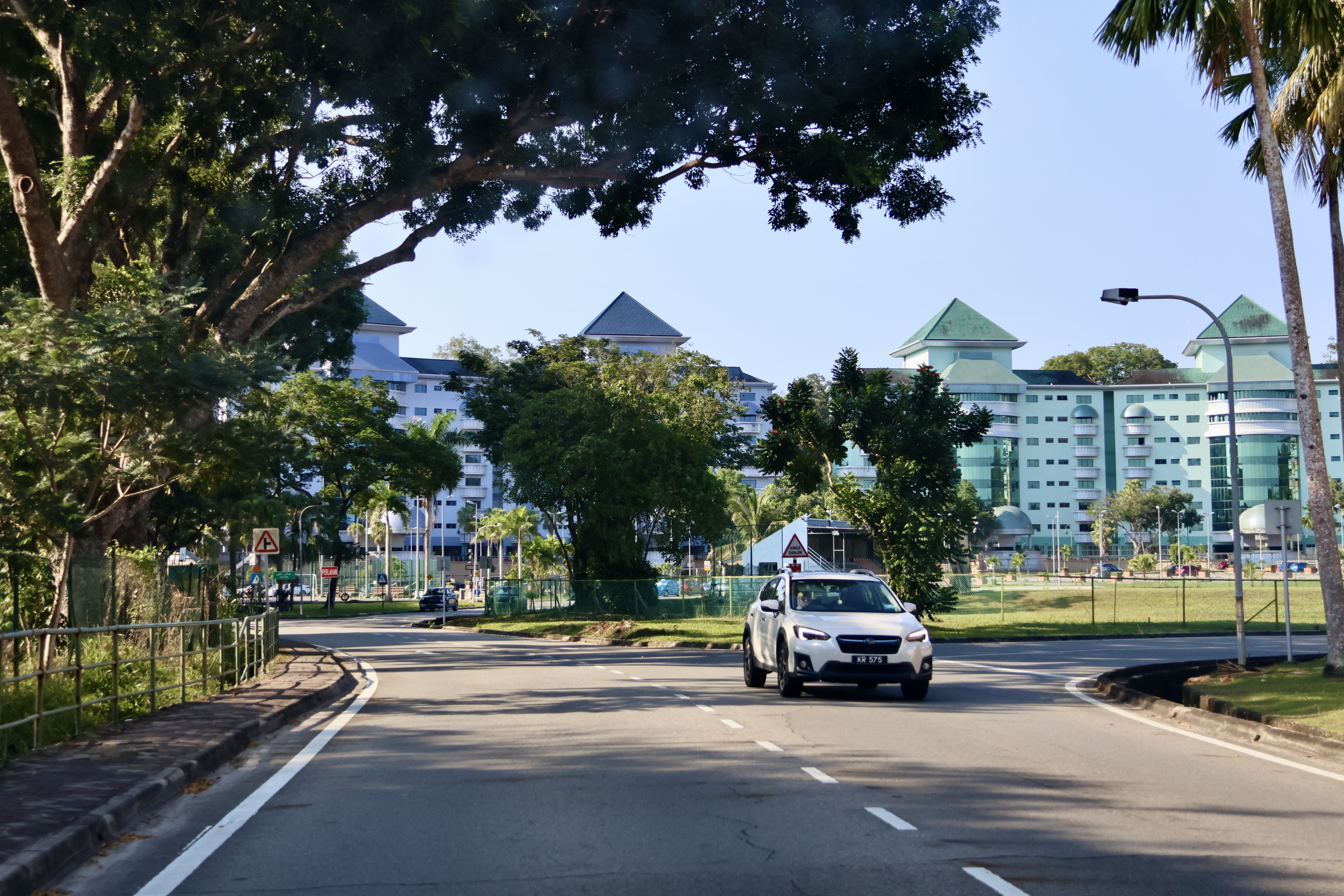
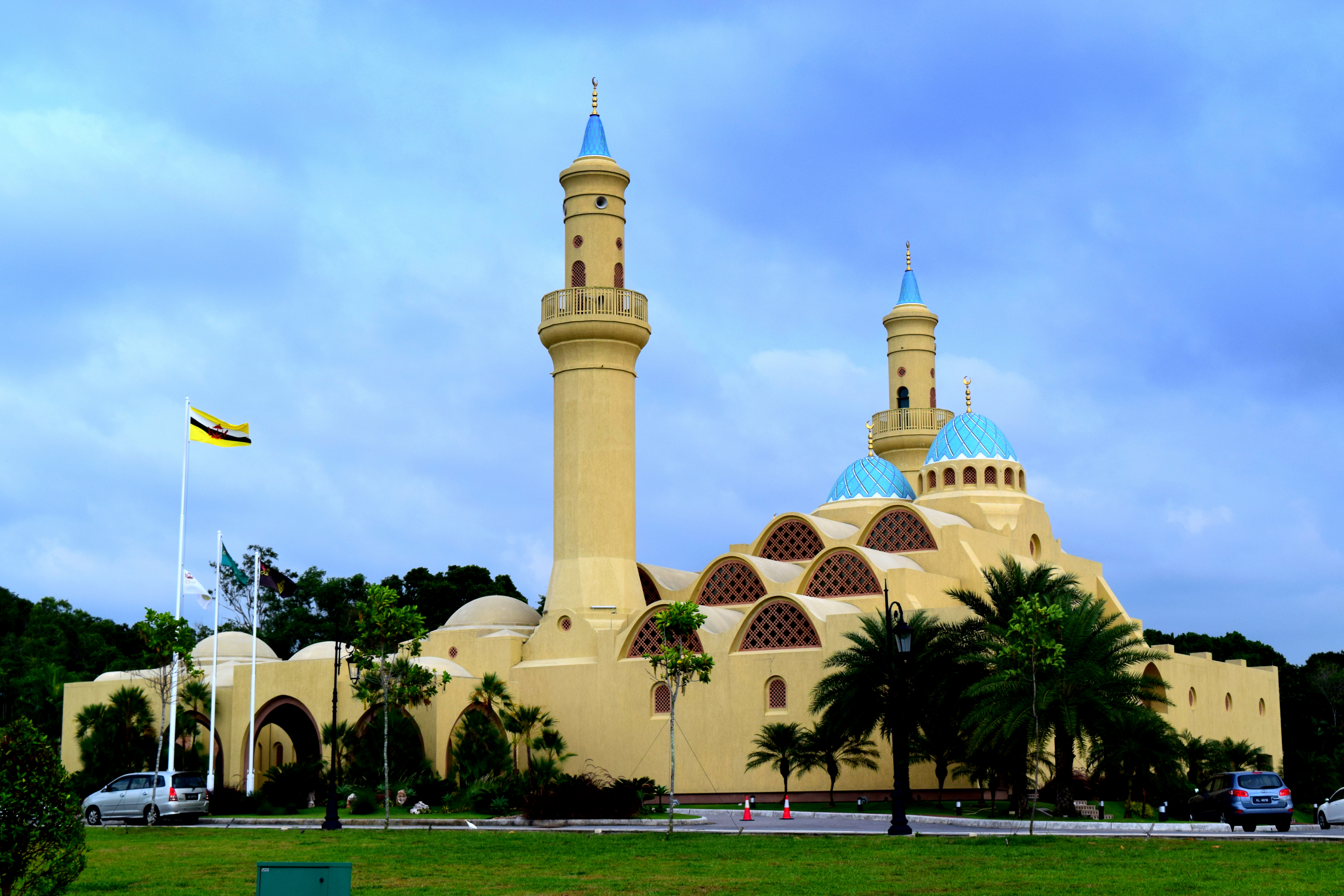
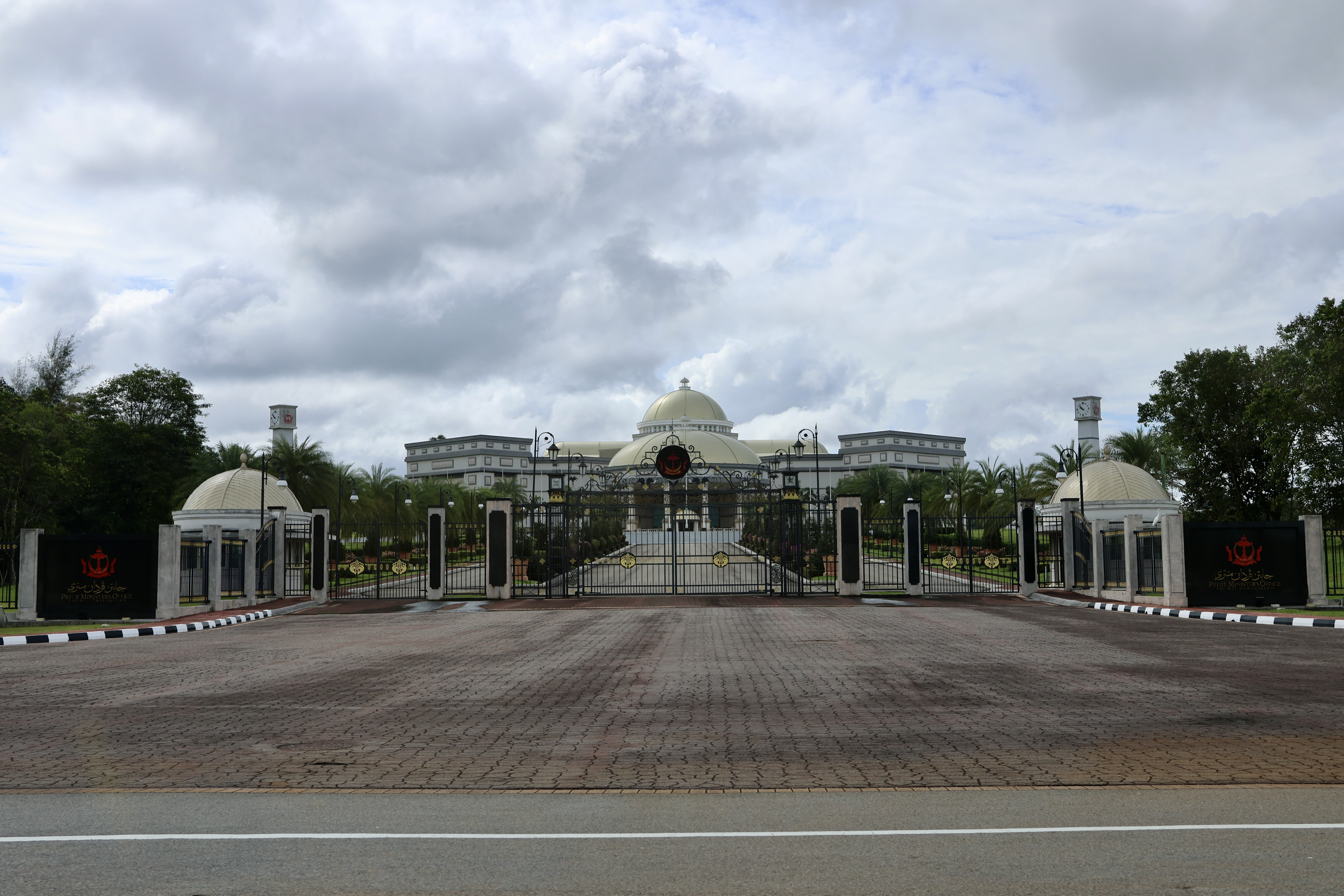
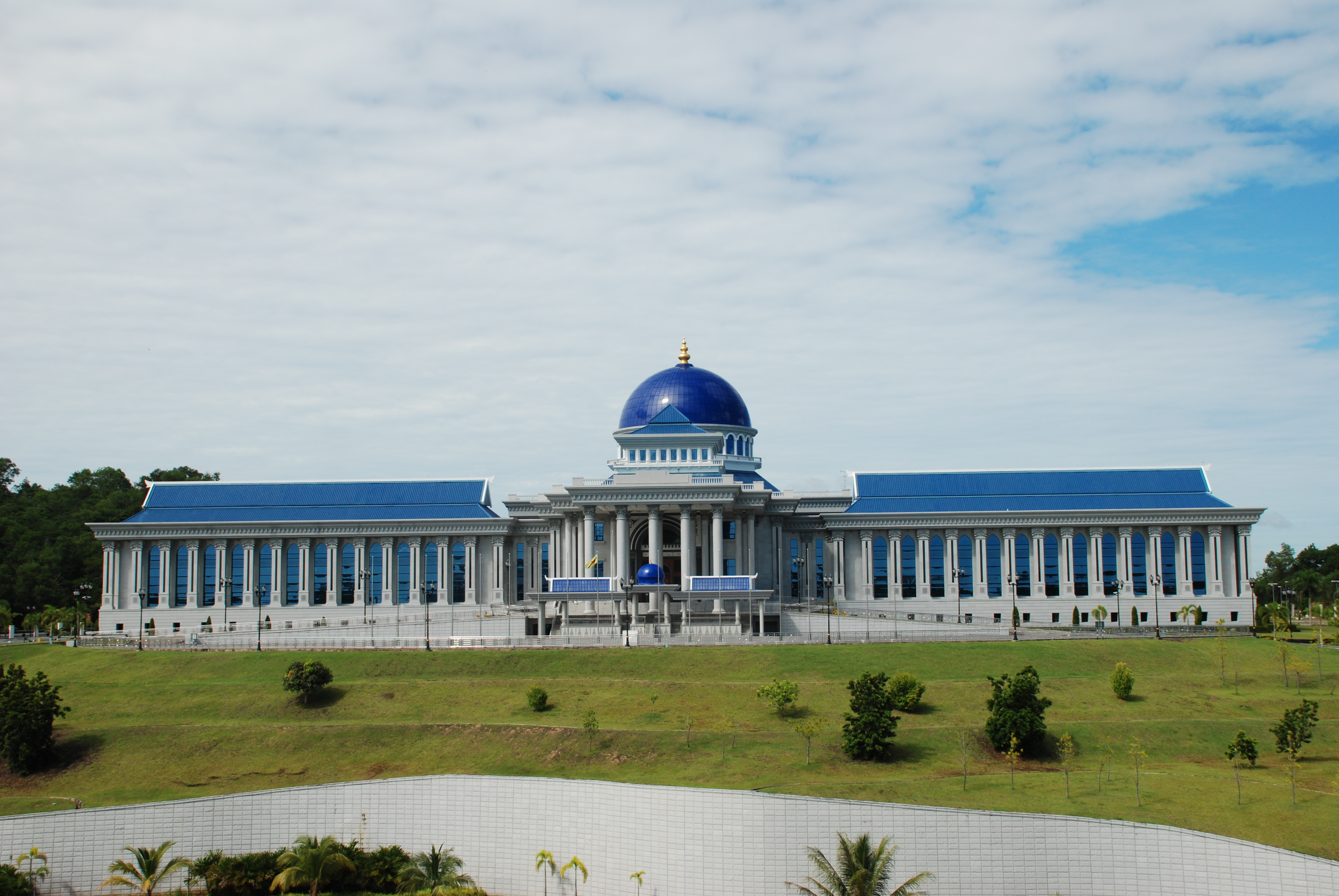
- Clockwise from top left: Jalan Ong Sum Ping, Ash-Shaliheen Mosque, Dewan Majlis, Prime Minister's Office

- Location in Brunei
- Coordinates: 4°54′50″N 114°56′07″E
- Country: Brunei
- District: Brunei–Muara
- Mukim: Kianggeh

Government
  - Village head: Lawi Lamat

Population (2021)
  - Total: 296
- Time zone: UTC+8 (BNT)
- Postcode: BA2511

Kampong Melabau (Malay: Kampung Melabau) is a neighbourhood in Brunei–Muara District, Brunei, as well as the capital Bandar Seri Begawan. The population was 288 in 2016. It is one of the villages within Mukim Kianggeh. The postcode is BA2511.

== Etymology ==
"Melabau" comes from two different places. First, it is linked to the Melabau River, which runs between Brunei River and Tungkadeh River. Secondly, it is associated with a big tree species called the Mabau tree, which flourished along the riverside and eventually became known as "Melabau." Thus, these combined factors led to the creation of the term Melabau.

The term "Orang Melabau" designates a revered group that has been passed down through the centuries and is renowned for its moral rectitude and religious dedication. In technical terms, "Melabau" means "ruler of the land." Additionally referred to as "Orang Kaya" (rich people), members of this group were well-known as powerful individuals in the palace, as shown by titles such as "Seri Laila Paduka Orang Kaya Besar." Tombstone inscriptions in Bukit Luba, Melabau, which frequently include words like "Ibnu" and "Al-Marhum," highlighting their aristocratic rank, reinforce this lineage.

== Infrastructure ==
One 800,000 gallons service reservoir at Melabau was documented in 1964. In 1965, site construction for four blocks (24 units) of teacher's apartments at Jalan Ong Sum Ping was underway, as was preparation for two blocks of Class C, E, and F apartments each on a site at Jalan Melabau. The village is also home to the first Department of Town and Country Planning headquarters at Jalan Tapak Kuda.

The Melabau area features several notable royal properties, including Qashr Al-Meezan, the private residence of the Crown Prince of Brunei. This residence is complemented by Assaraa, a private compound that hosts several villas, guest houses and a banquet hall.

=== Education ===
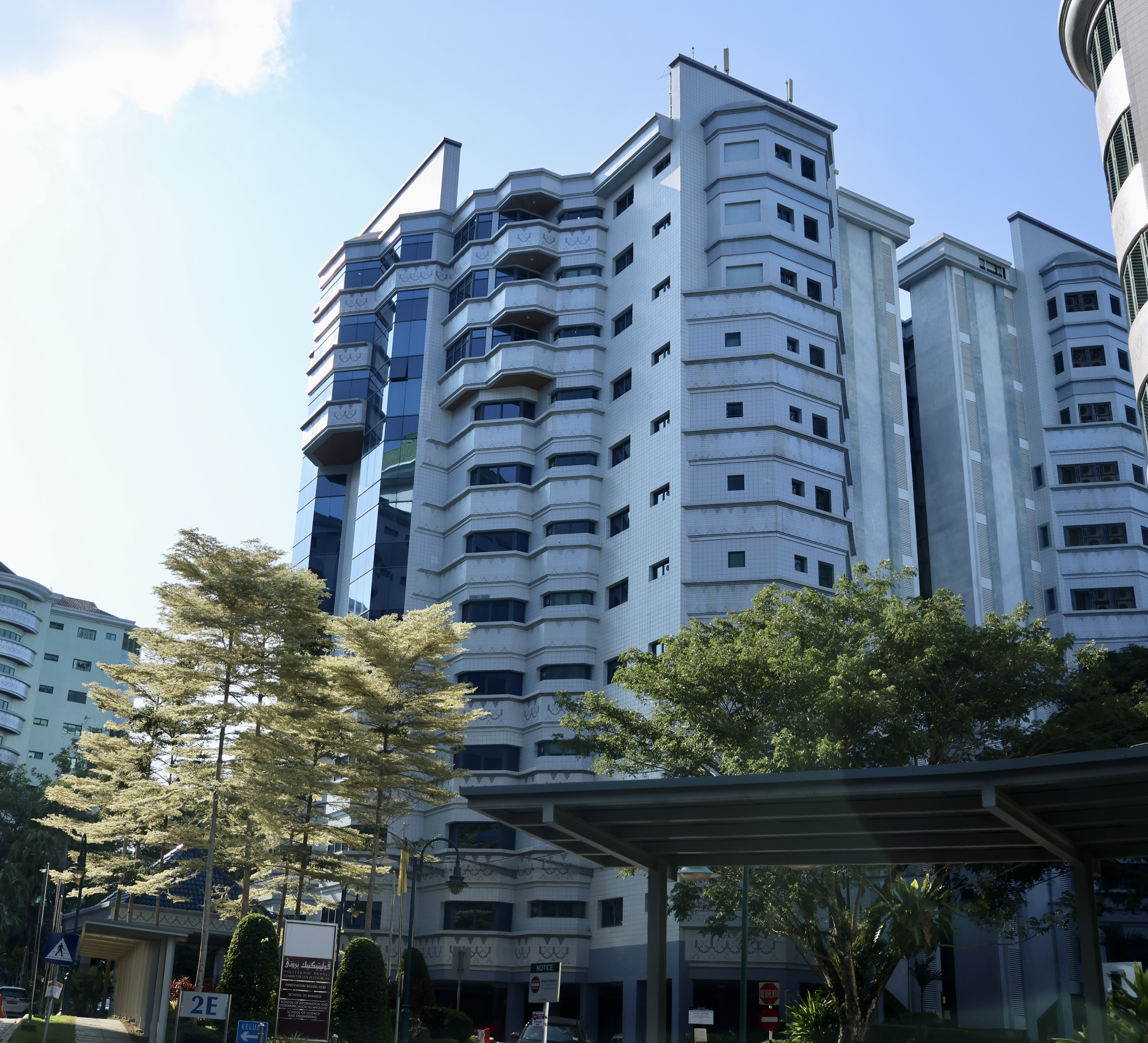
Ong Sum Ping Campus

The Ong Sum Ping Condominium in Melabau hosts several key educational institutions, including the main campus of Brunei Polytechnic at its Ong Sum Ping Campus and the JPMC College of Health Sciences, both of which operate in converted blocks of the complex.

=== Government ===
Melabau is home to a range of key government buildings that support Brunei's administrative and public services. This area includes multiple ministries such as the Ministry of Primary Resources and Tourism, the Ministry of Transport and Infocommunications, and the Ministry of Religious Affairs. Additionally, it houses essential departments including the Audit Department, Royal Customs and Excise Department, National Archive, Meteorological Department, Labour Department, Public Service Department and the Department of Immigration and National Registration. The Department of Economic Planning and Statistics, Brunei Darussalam Food Authority, Brunei Medical Board, and Department of Schools are all located in converted blocks of the Ong Sum Ping Condominium.

The new Dewan Majlis building, developed under Brunei's 8th National Development Plan and set on a 10.7 hectares (26 acres) site along Jalan Kebangsaan, aims to serve as a secure and independent facility symbolising Brunei's Melayu Islam Beraja philosophy, with its completion anticipated by 2007.

The Prime Minister's Office (PMO) building complex in Melabau, completed in time for Brunei's 22nd ASEAN Summit in April 2013, is a six-story, 92,000 square metres (990,000 sq ft) structure designed by Nizam Wahab, featuring two symmetrical wings around a central dome with landscape fountains, funded by the 10th National Development Plan.

=== Religion ===
The Ash-Shaliheen Mosque, located beside PMO building complex, is a Moroccan-style mosque designed by Egyptian architect Abdel-Wahed El-Wakil, completed in June 2012 with a retractable glass roof and seating for up to 1,000 worshippers.

== See also ==
- List of neighbourhoods in Bandar Seri Begawan
