= Halawa House =

The Halawa House or Agamy Beach House is a house located in Agami, Egypt that incorporates traditional Islamic and Egyptian prototypes. The project was completed in 1975 by Abdel-Wahed El-Wakil and was among the first recipients of the Aga Khan Award for Architecture in 1980. It is named after the project's client, Esmat Ahmed Halawa. The project was conceived as a method to bridge traditional forms and indigenous elements into a functional design for modern living.

== History ==
Agami is a seaside resort near Alexandria. Most of the housing projects in the area were bungalows of a low standard of quality. Running water and electricity are available, but no sewage. As the area is generally populated by the Bedouins, who have limited knowledge of the construction trade. Over time, plot sizes have generally shrunk, leading to limits on privacy.

== Design and construction ==
The house is built on a narrow plot of land, which is consistent with plot sizes in Agami. Although usually considered a disadvantage, the architect used the courtyard area as the focus of the house in order to maintain a level of privacy. The internal structure of the house is sparsely furnished in order to enhance a feeling of space within the narrow plot. The house is built from various materials, which re-enforce the theme of the bridging of the traditional and modern. These elements include reinforced concrete strip foundations, local limestone walls and red bricks for the arches. In addition to the courtyard and its fountain, the house has a loggia (a gallery or room with one or more open sides, especially one that forms part of a house and has one side open to the garden), a wind catch, alcoves, masonry benches and a belvedere (a summerhouse or open-sided gallery, commanding a fine view). The technology for the construction was low, with most of the workforce being local Bedouins. The only skilled labour on the project were the master mason, the plasterer and carpenter.

== Timeline and cost ==
The project was initiated in 1972 and construction commenced in January 1974. The project was completed in April 1975 and first occupancy in July of the same year. The project encountered minor delays, due to labour issues and late deliveries of carpentry materials. The complete cost for labour and materials was US $29,000.
