= King Saud Mosque =

Mosque in Jeddah, Saudi Arabia

- Arabic: مسجد الملك سعود
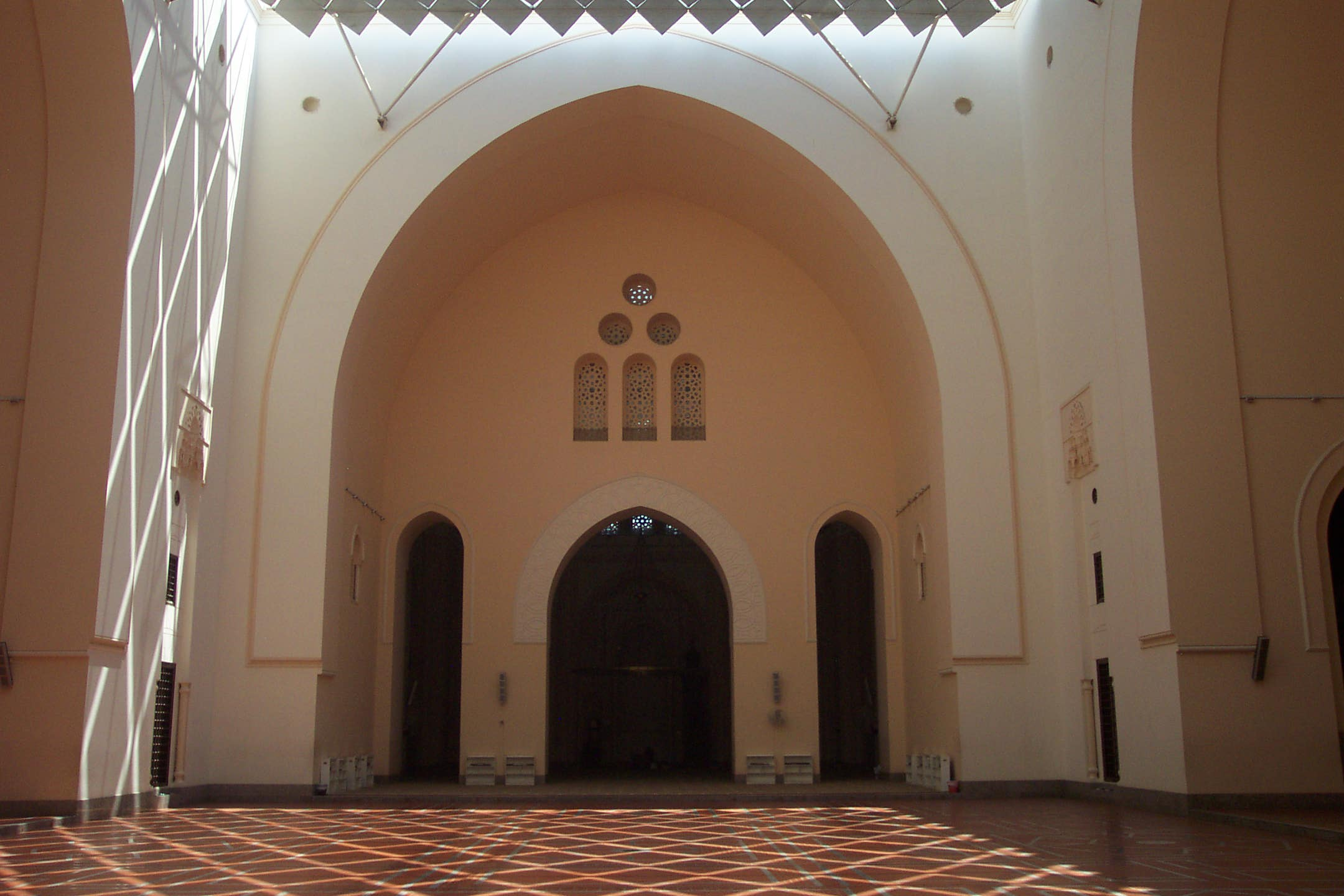
- The inside of the mosque

- Location within Saudi Arabia

Religion
- Affiliation: Sunni Islam
- Ecclesiastical or organizational status: Mosque
- Status: Active

Location
- Location: Jeddah, Al-Sharafeyyah
- Country: Saudi Arabia
- Interactive map of King Saud Mosque
- Coordinates: 21°31′18″N 39°10′57″E

Architecture
- Architect: Abdel-Wahed El-Wakil
- Type: Mosque architecture
- Style: Islamic New Classical
- Completed: 1987
- Construction cost: SAR 60,000,000

Specifications
- Interior area: 7,642 m^{2} (82,260 sq ft)
- Dome: Many
- Dome height (outer): 42 m (138 ft) (central)
- Dome dia. (outer): 20 m (66 ft) (central)
- Minaret: 1
- Minaret height: 60 m (200 ft)
- Site area: 9,700 m^{2} (104,000 sq ft)
- Materials: Bricks

His Majesty King Saud Mosque (Arabic: مسجد الملك سعود) is a Sunni Islam mosque, in the city of Jeddah, in the Al-Sharafeyyah District, in Saudi Arabia.

The mosque was designed by Abdel-Wahed El-Wakil and construction was completed in 1987. It is mainly built of bricks and covers an area of 9,700 square metres (104,000 ft^{2}) with the prayer hall alone covering 2,464 square metres (26,520 ft^{2}), making it the largest mosque in Jeddah. The largest dome has a span of 20 metres (66 ft) and reaches a height of 42 metres (138 ft). The minaret is 60 metres (200 ft) tall.

The 1987 mosque replaced an earlier mosque structure, built on the same site in c. 1950s, poorly constructed using reinforce concrete.

== Architecture ==
The layout is reminiscent of Persian four-iwan designs, such as the Great Mosque of Esfahan in Iran. The Mosque-Madrassa of Sultan Hassan in Cairo in Egypt may have served as a model for the minaret and other features such as the decoration of the attic.

The mosque itself is rectangular, almost square, with a rectangular court built somewhat offset to the west. Four iwans open to the central court. The iwans are not emphasized as individual structures as in the Persian examples but are mere openings in a large screen wall. The north and south iwans are each set in front of a domed hall that separate four pillared halls to the east and west. The west halls are divided by two pillars each into three naves with two bays. The larger east halls have three naves with five bays and eight pillars each. The east iwan is the largest and connects the court to the largest domed hall that rises between the longer pillared halls in front of the qibla wall.

Irregularly shaped rooms fill the triangular spaces between the actual mosque and the outside facade on the north, south and east wall because the mosque is built at an angle to the street grid so that the qibla wall may point to Makkah. The west facade opens to the Medinah Road with a large cubic structure added to the northern end. The minaret of the mosque towers over the south west corner of this structure that has a large iwan opening to the south leading into a domed hall that connects to a corridor that runs along the west wall of the mosque. This large Iwan with the minaret on the left and the mosque connecting at a right angle to the right, both accessible by a flight of steps, form an iconic group that easily catches the eye when looking north along the Medinah road.

The mosque was shortlisted for the Aga Khan Award for Architecture in 1989. The project was estimated to have cost SAR 60,000,000.

== Gallery ==
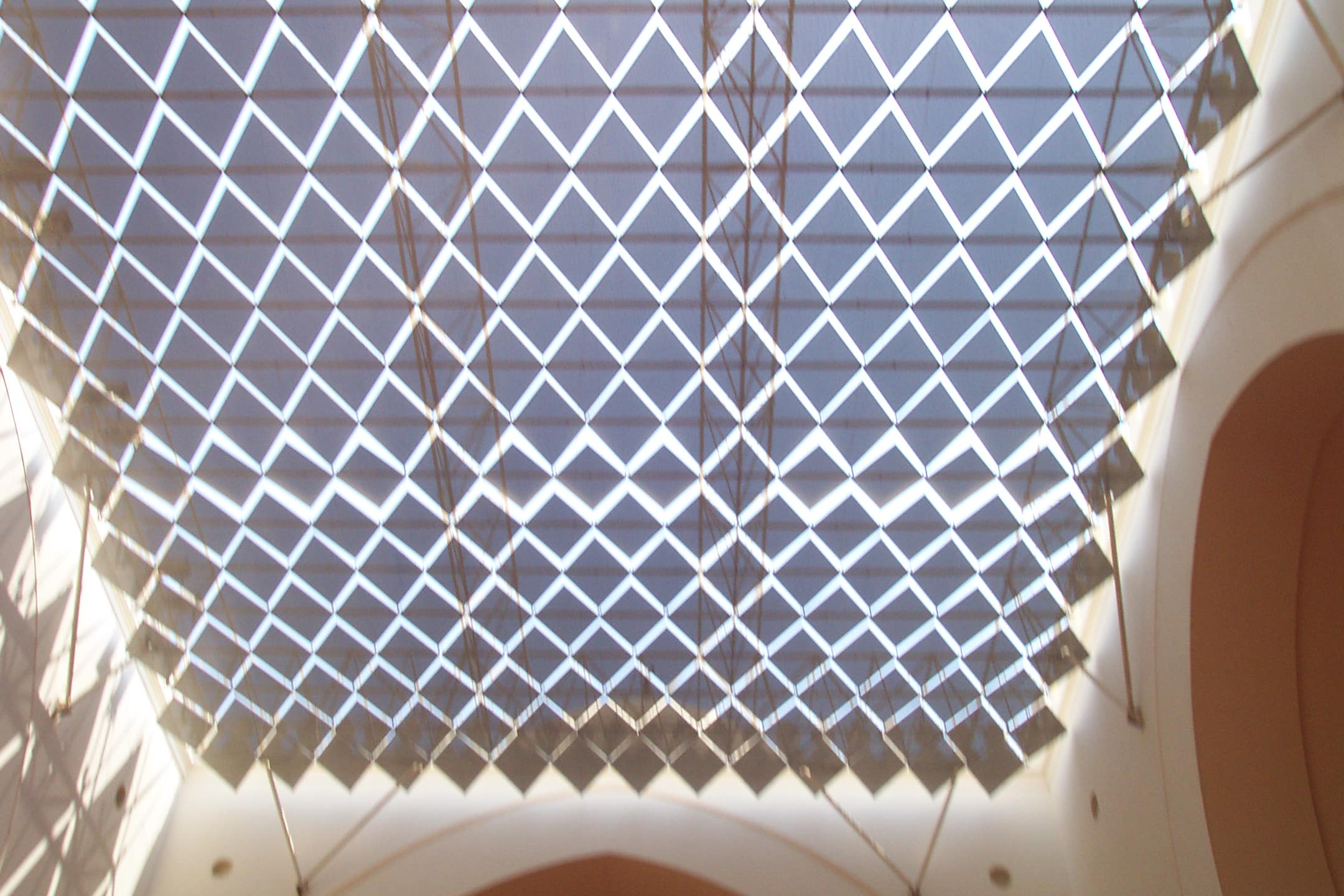
The sun shade over the central court

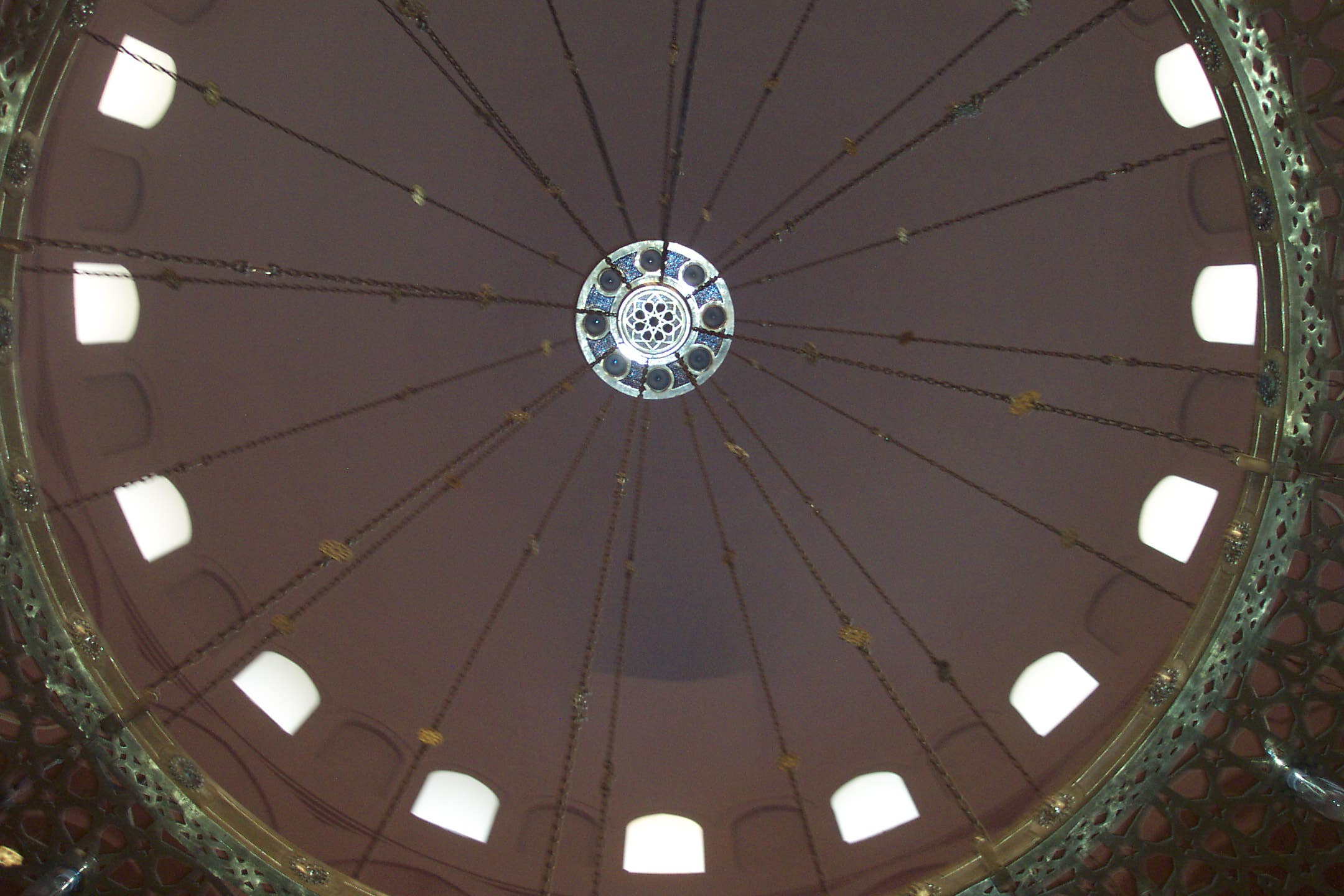
A dome seen from the inside

== See also ==
- List of mosques in Saudi Arabia
- Islam in Saudi Arabia
- List of things named after Saudi kings
