= Ash-Shaliheen Mosque =

Sunni mosque in Bandar Seri Begawan, Brunei

Ash Shaliheen Mosque
- Masjid Ash-Shaliheen
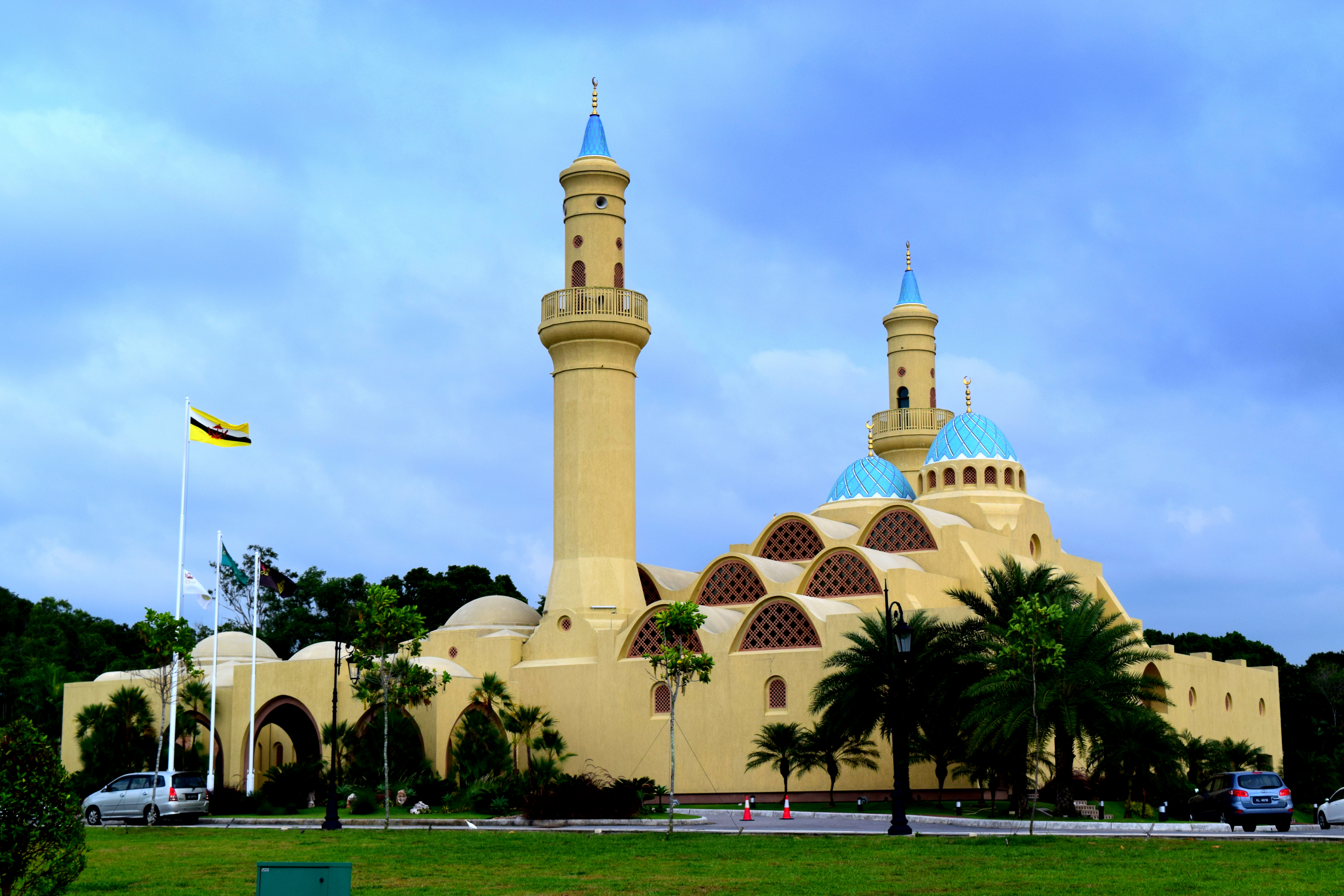
- The mosque in 2016

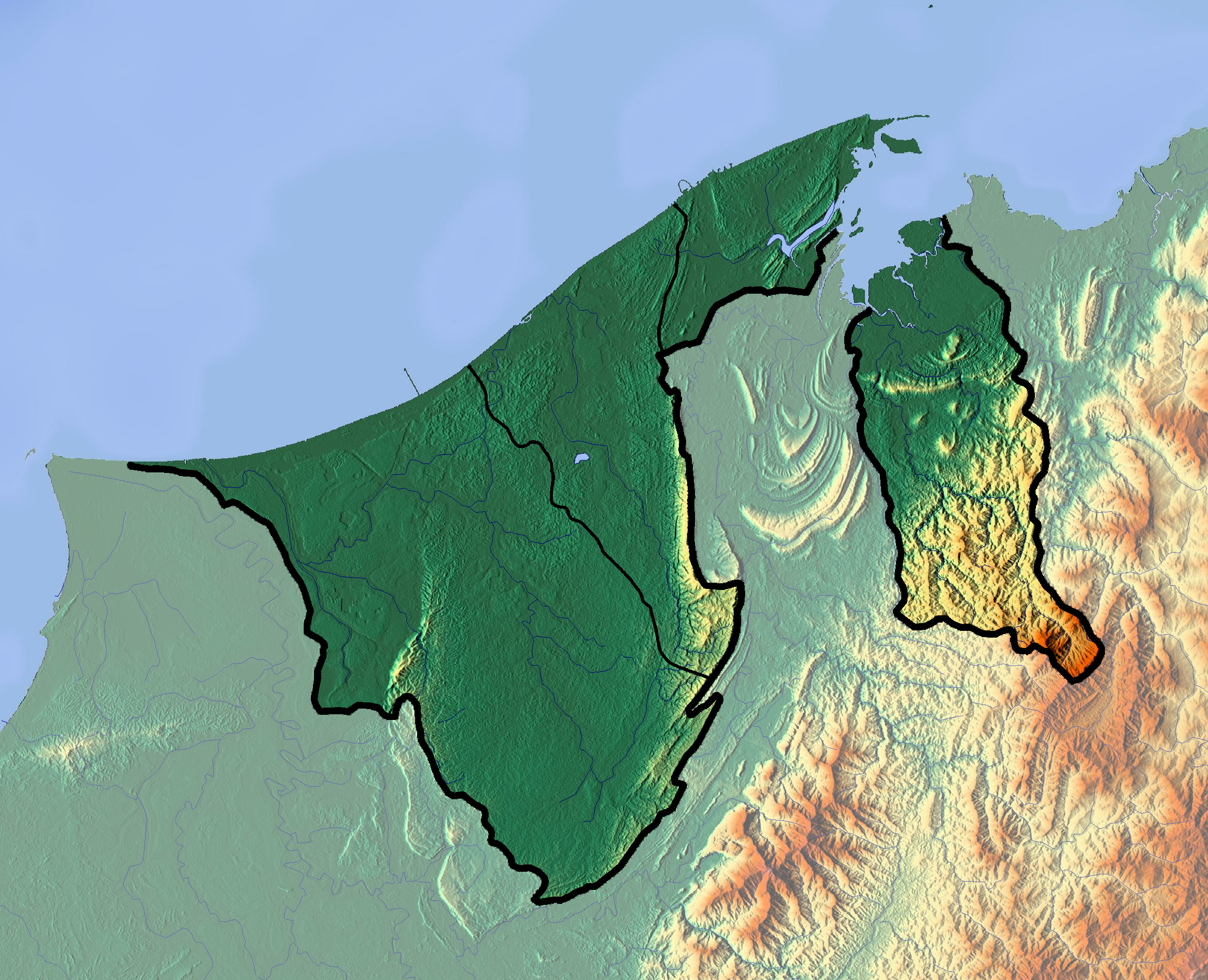
- Location of the mosque in Brunei

Religion
- Affiliation: Sunni Islam
- Ecclesiastical or organizational status: Mosque
- Ownership: Government of Brunei
- Governing body: Department of Mosque Affairs
- Status: Active

Location
- Location: Kampong Melabau, Bandar Seri Begawan
- Country: Brunei
- Interactive map of Ash Shaliheen Mosque
- Coordinates: 4°55′07″N 114°56′09″E

Architecture
- Architect: Abdel-Wahed El-Wakil
- Type: Mosque
- Style: Moorish
- Completed: 13 July 2012

Specifications
- Capacity: 1,000 worshipers
- Minaret: 2
- Site area: 2,100 m^{2} (23,000 sq ft)

The Ash Shaliheen Mosque (Malay: Masjid Ash-Shaliheen) is a mosque located in the Prime Minister's Office complex on Jalan Kumbang Pasang, in Kampong Melabau, Bandar Seri Begawan, Brunei, that was opened in 2012. Blending Moorish and Andalusian styles, features of the mosque include Brunei's first retractable roof, Moroccan mosaics, and an Italian dome. The mosque accommodates 700 worshippers.

== History ==
Sultan Hassanal Bolkiah was present for the first Friday prayer on 13 July 2012. Other members of the royal family, senior and deputy ministers, as well as representatives from the Ministry of Religious Affairs and the PMO, were with him. The Minister of Religious Affairs Pengiran Mohammad led the call of "Allahu Akbar" after the sultan signed a commemorative plaque to mark the occasion. Then, under the direction of State Mufti Abdul Aziz Juned, the sultan and the royal entourage joined the congregation for Friday prayers.

== Design and features ==
The Ash-Shaliheen Mosque spans 2,100 square metres (23,000 sq ft) and accommodates up to 700 worshippers, (Note: The mosque can accommodate up to 1,000 people at a time.) showcases a blend of Andalusian and Moorish Maghrebi architecture. Features of the mosque include water elements in the sahn, a central area adorned with Moroccan mosaics, a marble fountain with Moroccan brass lamps, an Italian mosaic dome, a Middle Eastern-style mimbar, and prayer hall walls that were embellished with hand-carved Moroccan mosaics and Arabic calligraphy.

Designed by Abdel-Wahed El-Wakil in 2012, the mosque combines traditional aesthetics with influences from Isfahan and Hassan Fathy's architectural style, evident in its blue domes, tall minarets, low domes, and stacked spherical arches for ventilation.

It is Brunei's first mosque with a retractable roof and offers modern amenities, including a multipurpose hall, separate restrooms and ablution areas for men and women, an imam’s office, and parking facilities for approximately 130 vehicles.

== Gallery ==
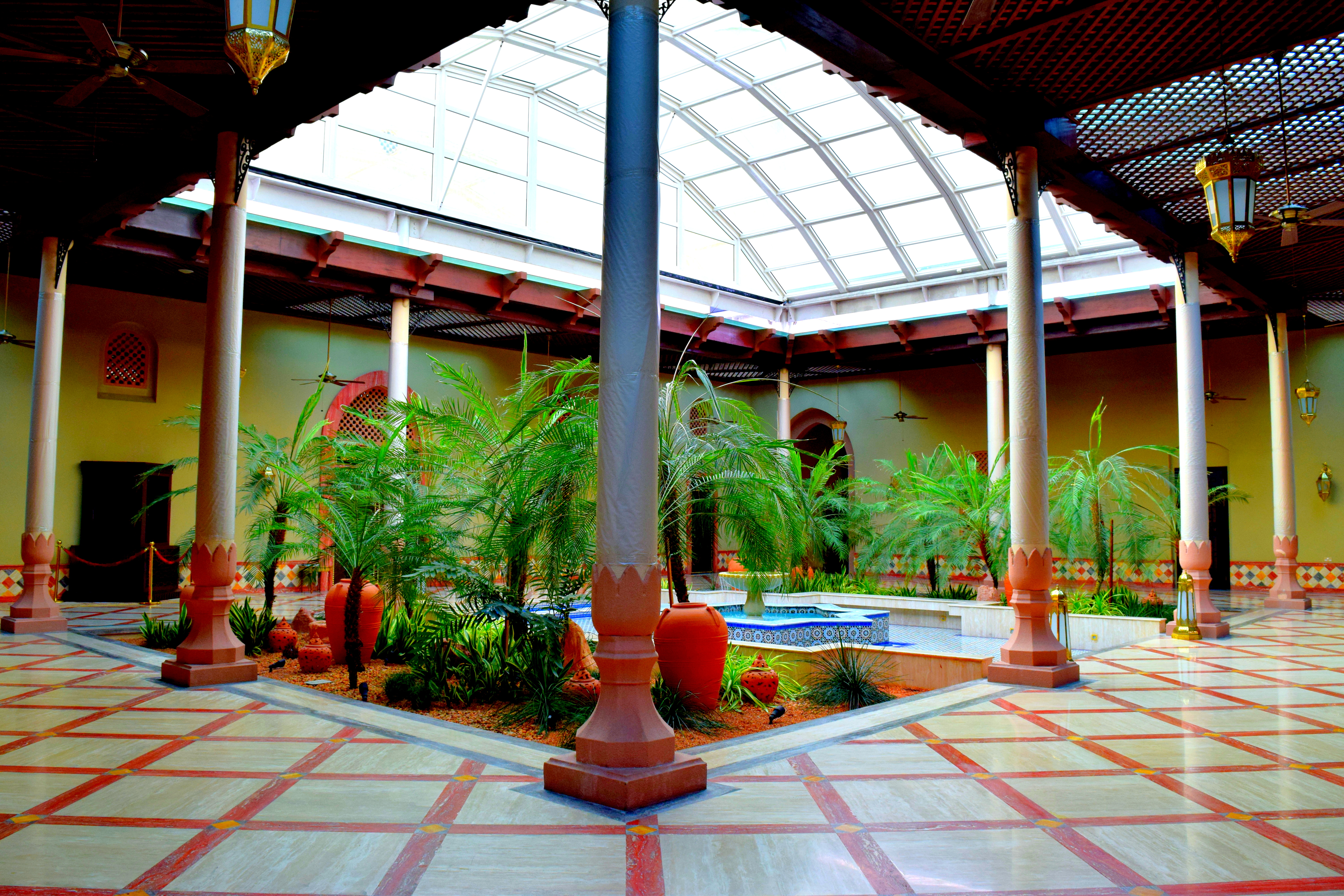
The mosque's marble fountain

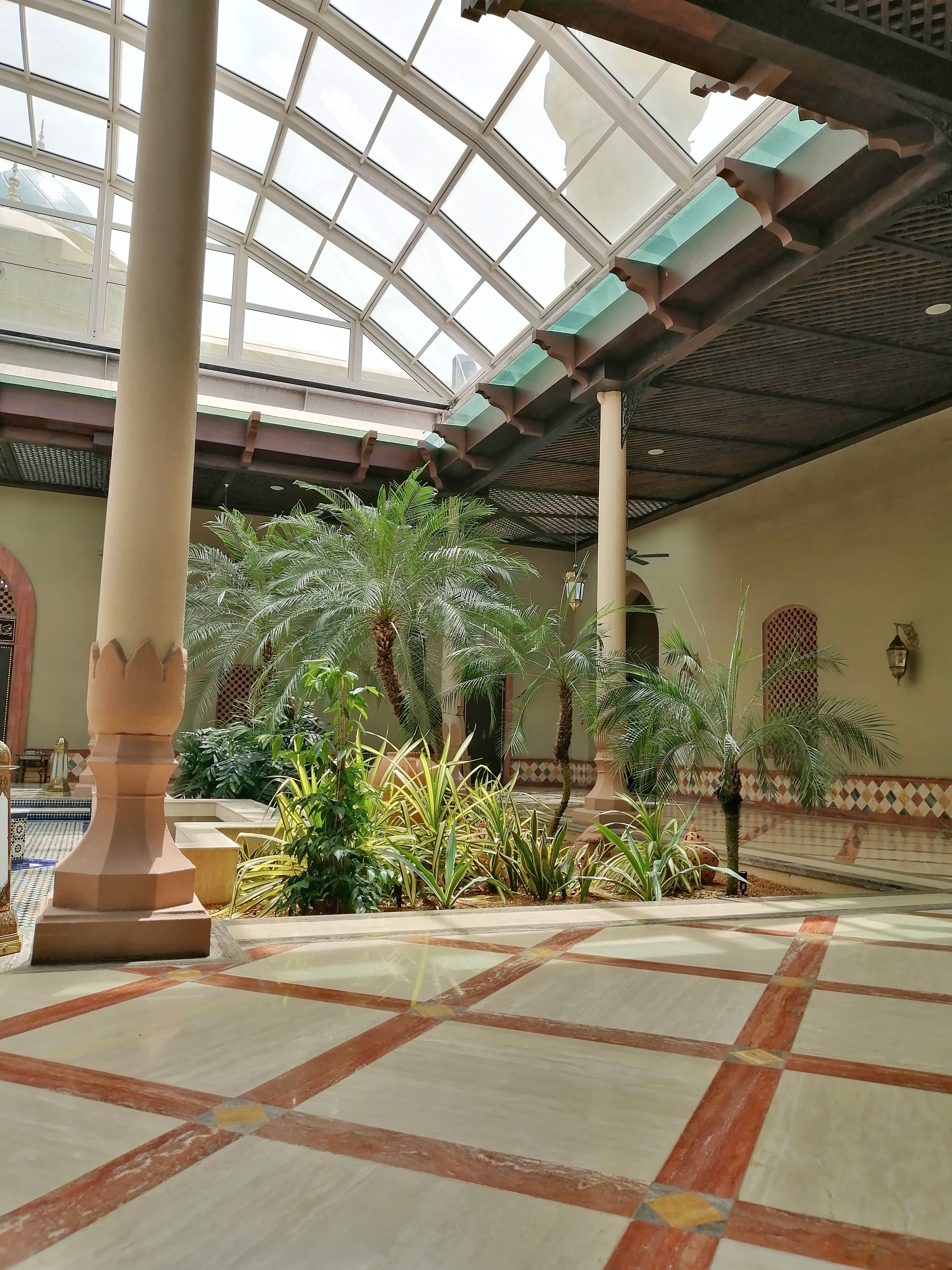
The interior of the mosque

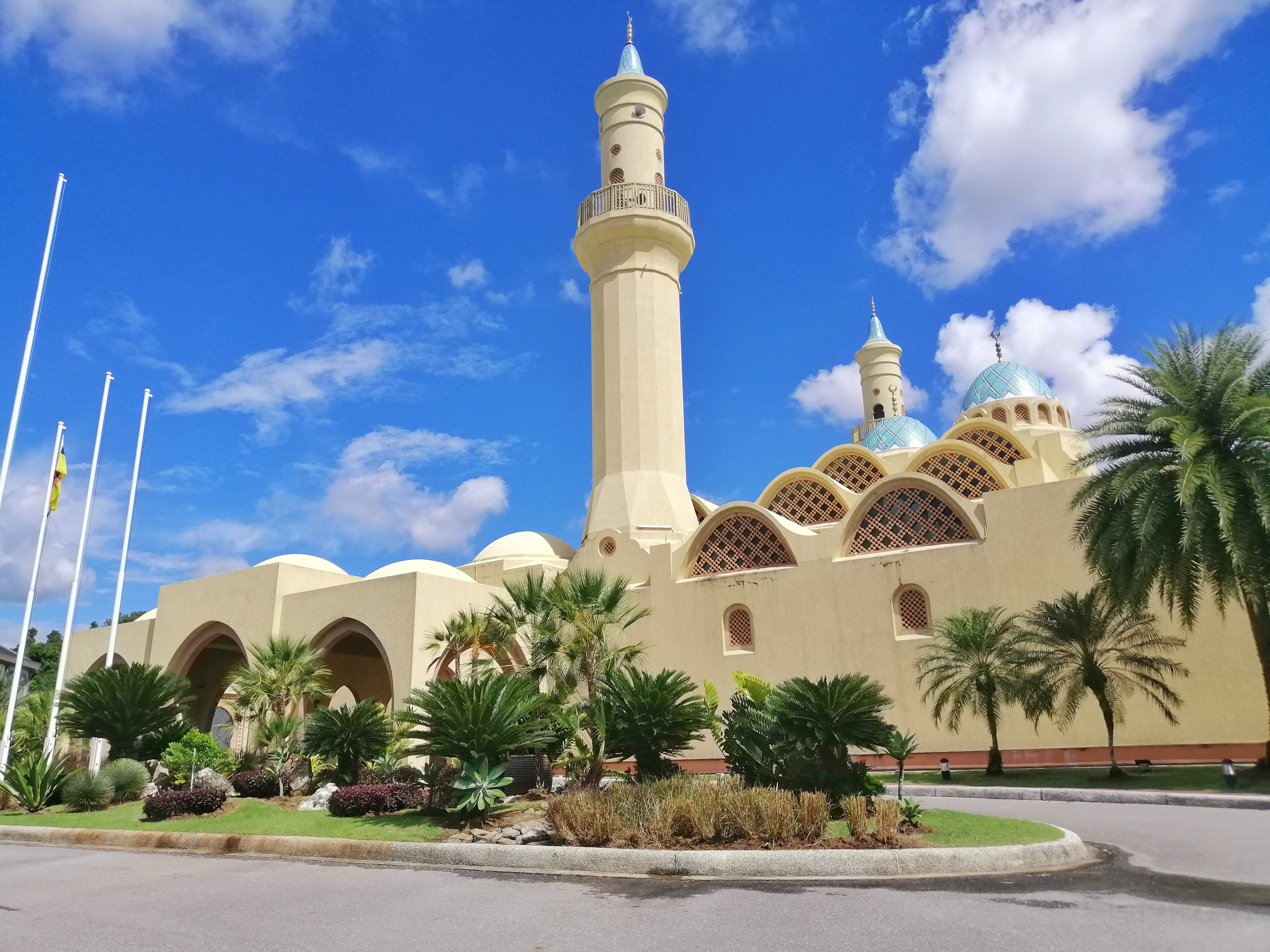
The mosque in 2021

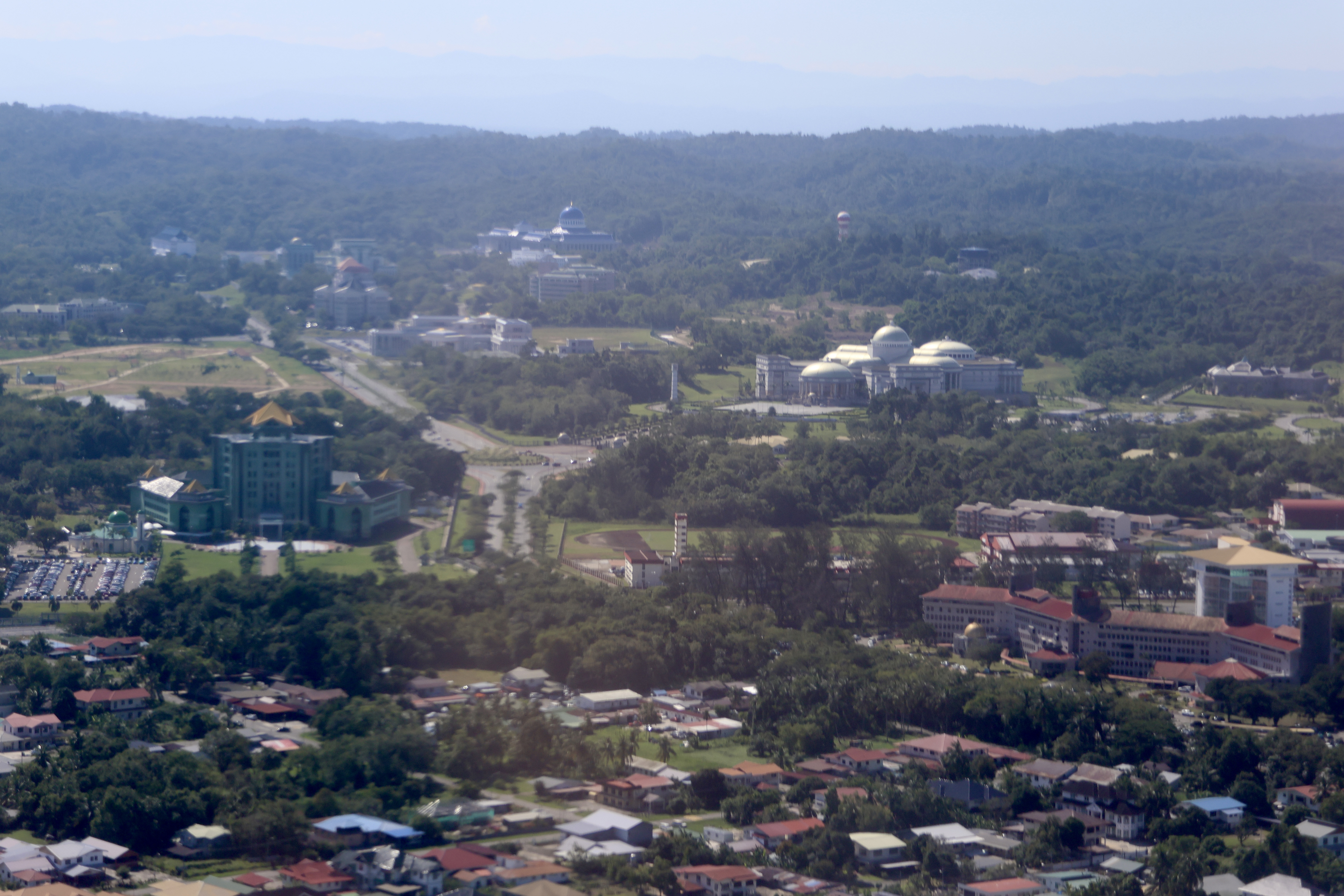
The PMO building and mosque in 2024

== See also ==
- Islam in Brunei
- List of mosques in Brunei
