= Oxford Centre for Islamic Studies =

Research centre in Oxford, England

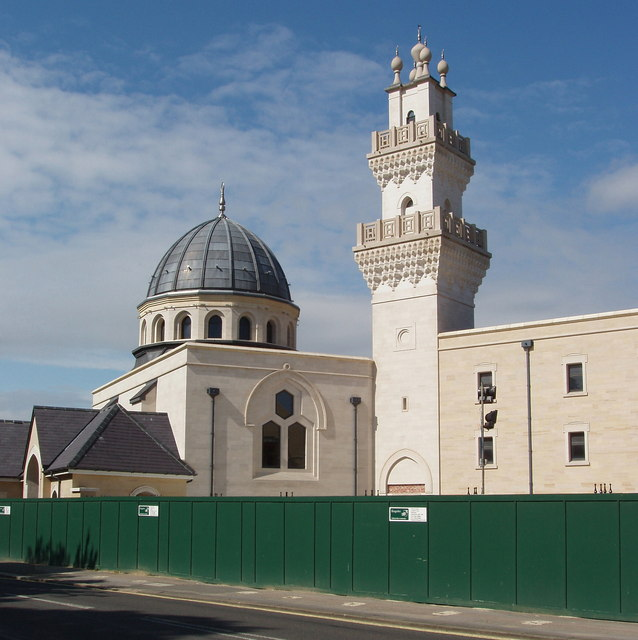
Oxford Centre for Islamic Studies building, operational from 2016.

The Oxford Centre for Islamic Studies (OXCIS) is an independent centre and University of Oxford affiliate, established in 1985 for advanced research into Islam and Muslim societies and located on Marston Road.

The centre's governance is overseen by a board of trustees comprising scholars, statespeople from around the world, and representatives of the University of Oxford. King Charles III serves as its patron.

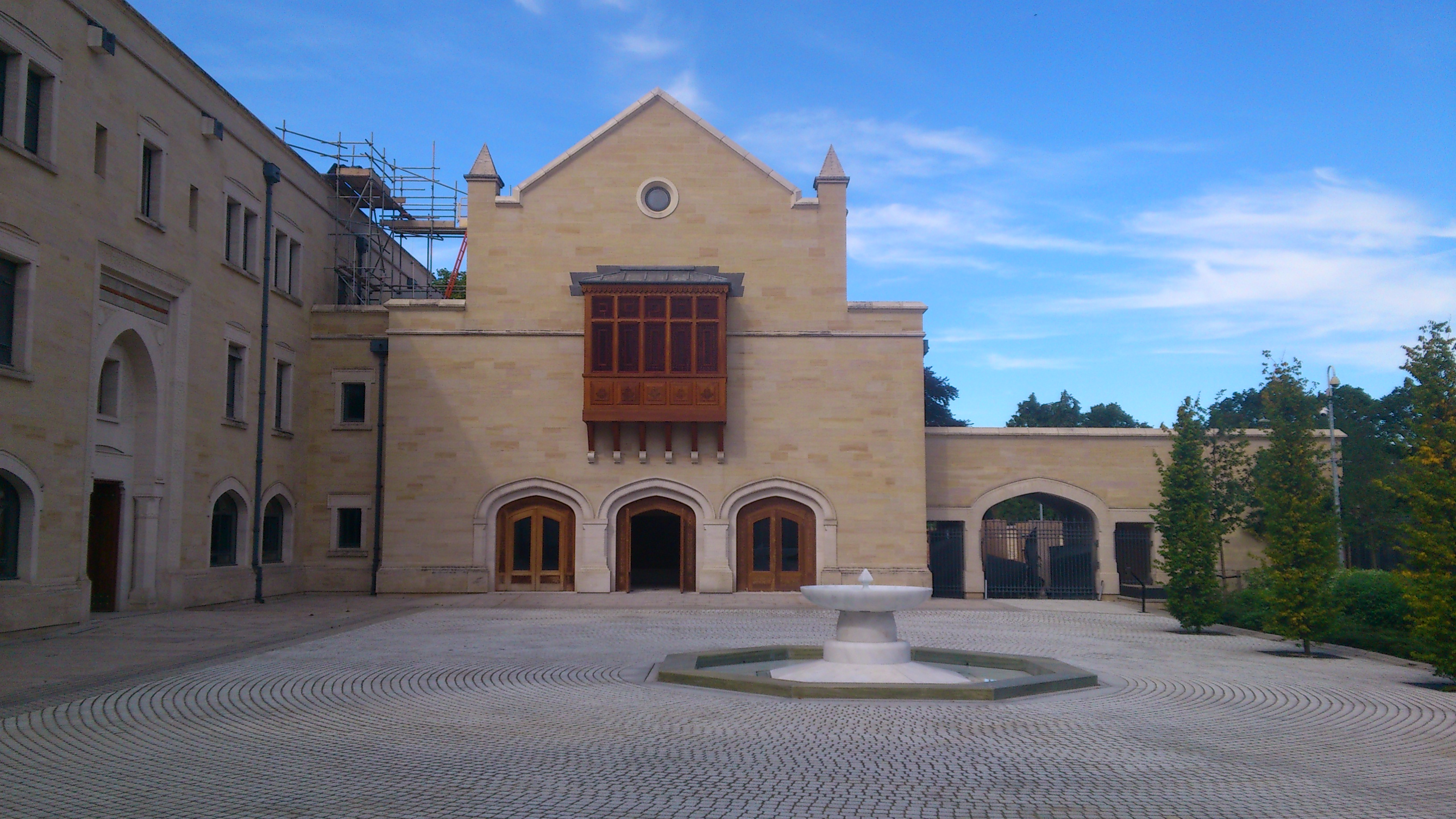
The front courtyard inside the Oxford Centre for Islamic Studies (2012)

Dedicated to studying Islamic culture, civilization, and contemporary Muslim societies through a multi-disciplinary lens, the centre's fellows contribute to various departments, faculties, and colleges within the university. Students and senior academics have visited Oxford over the years through the centre's Scholarships and Visiting Fellowships programmes. The centre organises lectures, seminars, workshops, conferences, exhibitions, and other academic events throughout the academic year.

== History ==
Since 1993, when the then-Prince of Wales delivered his inaugural lecture, "Islam and the West", the centre has hosted lectures by distinguished statespeople and scholars. Speakers have included heads of state and government, internationally renowned scholars from the Muslim world and beyond, and secretaries-general of international organizations, including the United Nations, the Organisation of Islamic Cooperation, the Arab League, UNESCO, and the Commonwealth of Nations.

In 2012, it received a royal charter from Queen Elizabeth II.

The centre began in a wooden hut on St Cross Road before relocating to offices on George Street in 1990. In the 2016/2017 academic year, it moved into a new building designed by Abdel-Wahed El-Wakil.
