= Abdel-Wahed El-Wakil =

Egyptian architect (born 1943)

- Born: 7 August 1943 (age 83); Cairo, Kingdom of Egypt
- Education: Victoria College, Alexandria; Ain Shams University
- Occupation: Architect
- Awards: Aga Khan Award for Architecture (1980, 1989); Driehaus Architecture Prize 2009
- Buildings: Corniche Mosque (Jeddah); Quba Mosque (Medinah); Qiblatain Mosque (Medinah); King Saud Mosque (Jeddah)

Abdel-Wahed El-Wakil (Arabic: عبد الواحد الوكيل, born 7 August 1943) is an Egyptian architect who has designed over fifteen mosques in Saudi Arabia and is considered by many as the foremost contemporary authority in Islamic architecture. For designing in traditional styles, he is also a representative of New Classical architecture.

== Life ==
=== Education and early teaching career ===
El-Wakil's early education was in Egypt at the British schools of Victoria College in Alexandria; and the English School. In 1960, he obtained his General Certificate of Education (GCE) and graduated with a distinction in applied mathematics, art, physics, and chemistry. In the same year, he joined the Faculty of Engineering at Ain Shams University and in 1965 acquired his BSc in Architecture with Distinction and First Honours Degree. It was while studying for his degree that El-Wakil became acquainted with the writings of English critic John Ruskin. Ruskin's descriptions of what he termed an "arborescent" quality in architecture (a bold structure of decoration, legible at a distance, reveals ever-finer sub-structures as you approach it) had a lasting effect upon him.

From 1965 to 1970, he was appointed as an instructor and lecturer at the Architecture Department of his Faculty.

In 1967, El-Wakil's whole approach to architecture was altered when he met with his mentor professor Hassan Fathy. Having previously built three apartment buildings in the idioms of his former education in modern-style architecture, El-Wakil decided to become an apprentice to Fathy. As with Frank Lloyd Wright, Fathy's mention was taboo at the Ain Shams Department of Architecture and that forced El-Wakil to end his teaching post at the Faculty and begin his new education with his mentor.

=== Career ===
Fathy's quest for indigenous architecture had taken the momentum from the post-war crisis of World War II. The war caused an economic shortage in industrial construction materials. It then occurred to Fathy that the Nubians of Upper Egypt managed to build the most beautiful houses with mud – the humble material below their feet.

After five years of working with Fathy, El-Wakil had the opportunity to design and build a house by the beach of Agami near Alexandria. The 1967 Six-Day War had brought Egypt into an economic disaster and again modern building materials became scarce and expensive. It was a unique opportunity for El-Wakil to interpret Fathy's design philosophy of architecture for the poor. The Halawa house at Agami made use of the abundant limestone within the area, introducing the first indigenous Egyptian architecture in a resort that began with a pseudo–French Riviera style and finished with pseudo-Modern.

El-Wakil built two more houses in Egypt. The Hamdy house, and the Chourbagy house, both by the Pyramids Road on the outskirts of Cairo.

The Hamdy house was conceived as a small weekend house with a sleeping loft. The design encapsulated in an embryonic form the main elements in traditional Arab houses.

The Chourbagy house was conceived as a model for a typical townhouse on a narrow frontage plot. The house made extensive use of traditional design elements and local craftsmanship.

== Saudi Arabian career ==
With the oil boom in 1973, Saudi Arabia provided a majority of commissions for El-Wakil. He undertook the design of a number of grand mansions, developing a design approach of internalised spaces of atriums, patios, and courtyards, which appeared unfamiliar to the prevailing trend of extrovert villa-type houses.

The first in this series of houses was the Zahran mansion, as a precursor to the Suleiman palace in Jeddah. The Suleiman palace became a unique expression of contemporary architecture applying traditional Arab design concepts. In a survey of architecture in Saudi Arabia, the AIA Journal nominated it as one of the best designs accomplished.

Two more houses were built in Saudi Arabia; the Alireza mansion in Riyadh and the Kandiel house in Jeddah, both in load-bearing brick construction.

Another three interesting house designs in Saudi Arabia, that failed to get built, were the Mansur Badr residence in Riyadh, the Mansur Badr townhouse in Makkah, and the Hossam Khashoggi residence in Taif.

=== Other works ===
Beyond Saudi Arabia, El-Wakil designed a contemporary Arab courtyard town house for Farouk Sultan in Kuwait. The University of Durham in the U.K. taught the design of the Farouk Sultan house as an example of environmental design.

Another small house was designed on the Island of Hydra in Greece. In his book A Vision of Britain, the Prince of Wales presented it as an example for his ideas on traditional architecture.

In 1993, El-Wakil designed a mansion for Thomas Kramer in Miami, Florida. Vincent Scully, in his book Between the Two Towers, gave it generous mention.

By the time the Suleiman mansion had been completed, El-Wakil's work had caught the attention of Sheikh Said Farsi, the mayor of Jeddah, who appointed him as advisor.

== Mosque works ==
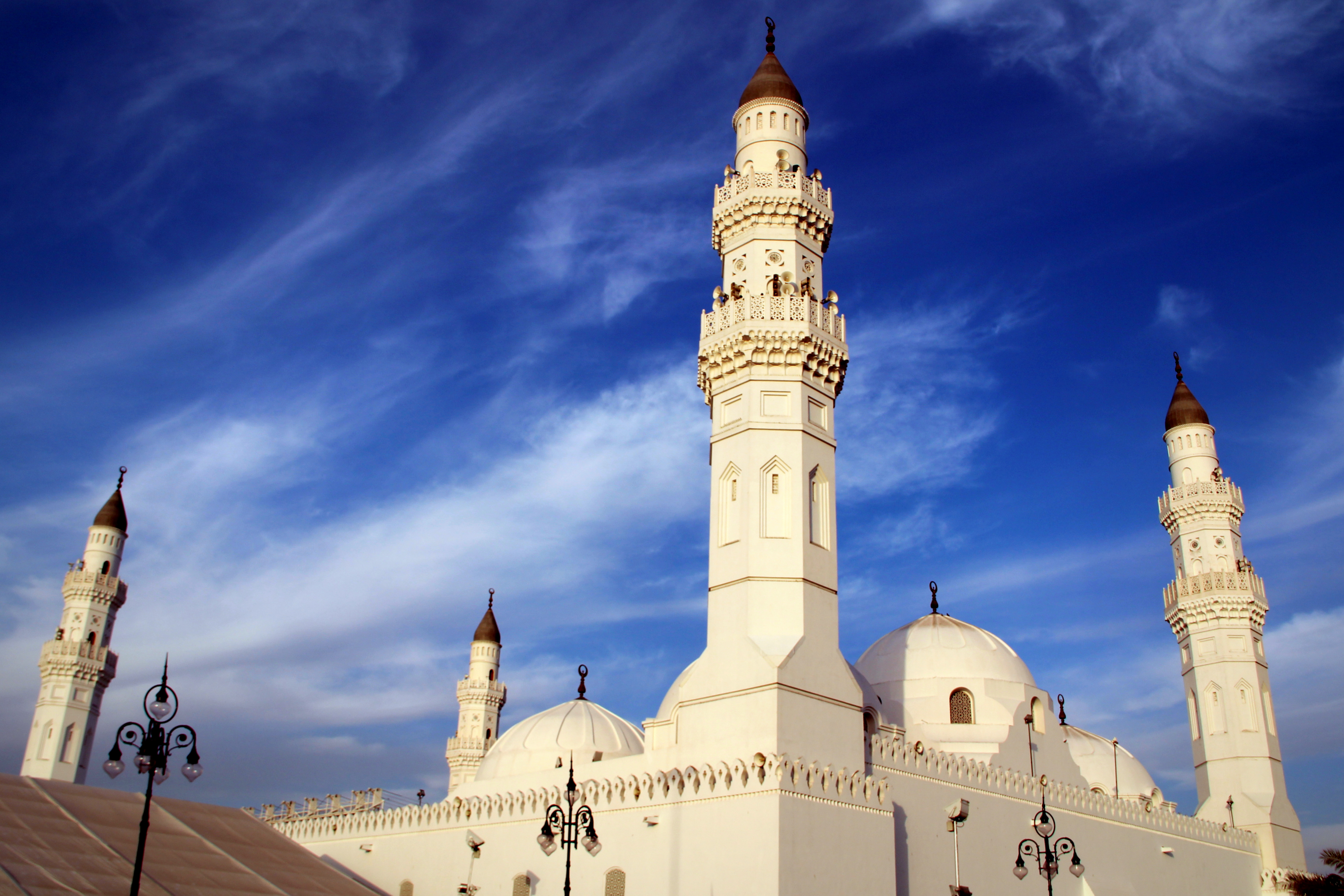
The Quba Mosque in Medina, Saudi Arabia (2014)

In collaboration with the Ministry of Pilgrimage and Endowment, a program for mosque architecture was established for the reconstitution of traditional architecture, for the first time enabling the construction of compressive brick structures devoid of concrete.

With support from mayor Said Farsi and deputy minister Hossam Khashoggi, El-Wakil designed more than fifteen mosques over a period of ten years. He worked individually on detailed designs, developed building techniques, and designed minarets, and vaulted and domed structures.

Four little mosques; the Island mosque, the Corniche mosque, the Ruwais mosque and the Abraj mosque were commissioned as part of the beautification of New Jeddah.

Five other grand mosques were commissioned in Jeddah; the Suleiman mosque, the Harithy mosque, the Azizeyah mosque, the Jufalli mosque and the monumental King Saud Mosque. They were all in brick construction and provided an opportunity to develop traditional building crafts. The brick dome of the King Saud Mosque with a diameter of twenty meters and a peak height of forty meters challenged structural engineers who refused liability for its construction without concrete. El-Wakil signed an affidavit taking full responsibility for its structure. Being directly commissioned by King Fahd and promoted by the mayor of Jeddah, El-Wakil managed to circumvent all the bureaucratic regulations that would have prevented the mosque ever being built.

Four Pilgrimage mosques of great historic significance were commissioned in Medina:

- The design and reconstruction of the Quba Mosque built on the site where the very first mosque in Islam was erected.
- The design and reconstruction of the Qiblatain Mosque said to have been the mosque where the worshipers first changed the direction of their prayers from Jerusalem towards Mecca according to divine revelation.
- The design and reconstruction of the Prophet's Mosque, the congregation mosque, said to have been the mosque where the first Friday prayers in Islam were performed.
- The Miqat Dhu al-Hulayfah complex, designed for pilgrims to perform their purification rites and prayers before entering the Holy city of Madinah.

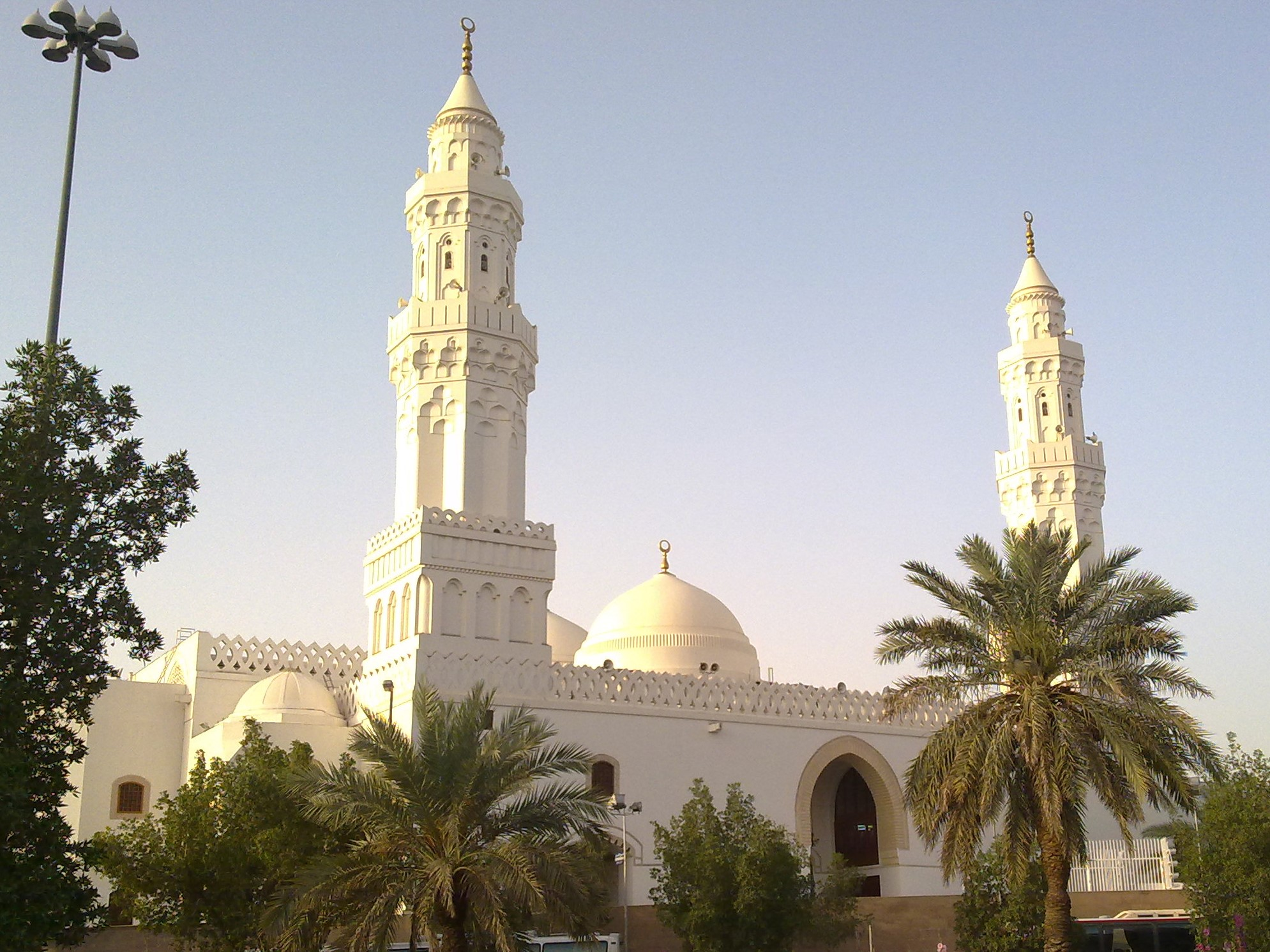
The Qiblatayn Mosque in Medina, Saudi Arabia (2011)

He later designed two mosques in Riyadh and one in Diraiyah on the outskirts of Riyadh. The Maydani Mosque in Riyadh was the only one built.

He designed another two mosques for the city of Makkah:

- The Bilal Mosque, never built, was named after the muezzin who announced the call to prayer for Muhammad. The earlier mosque had been demolished with the new expansions of the Haram.
- The Hafayer mosque near the Haram was completed for prayers in the month of Ramadan2008.

=== Mosques outside Saudi Arabia ===
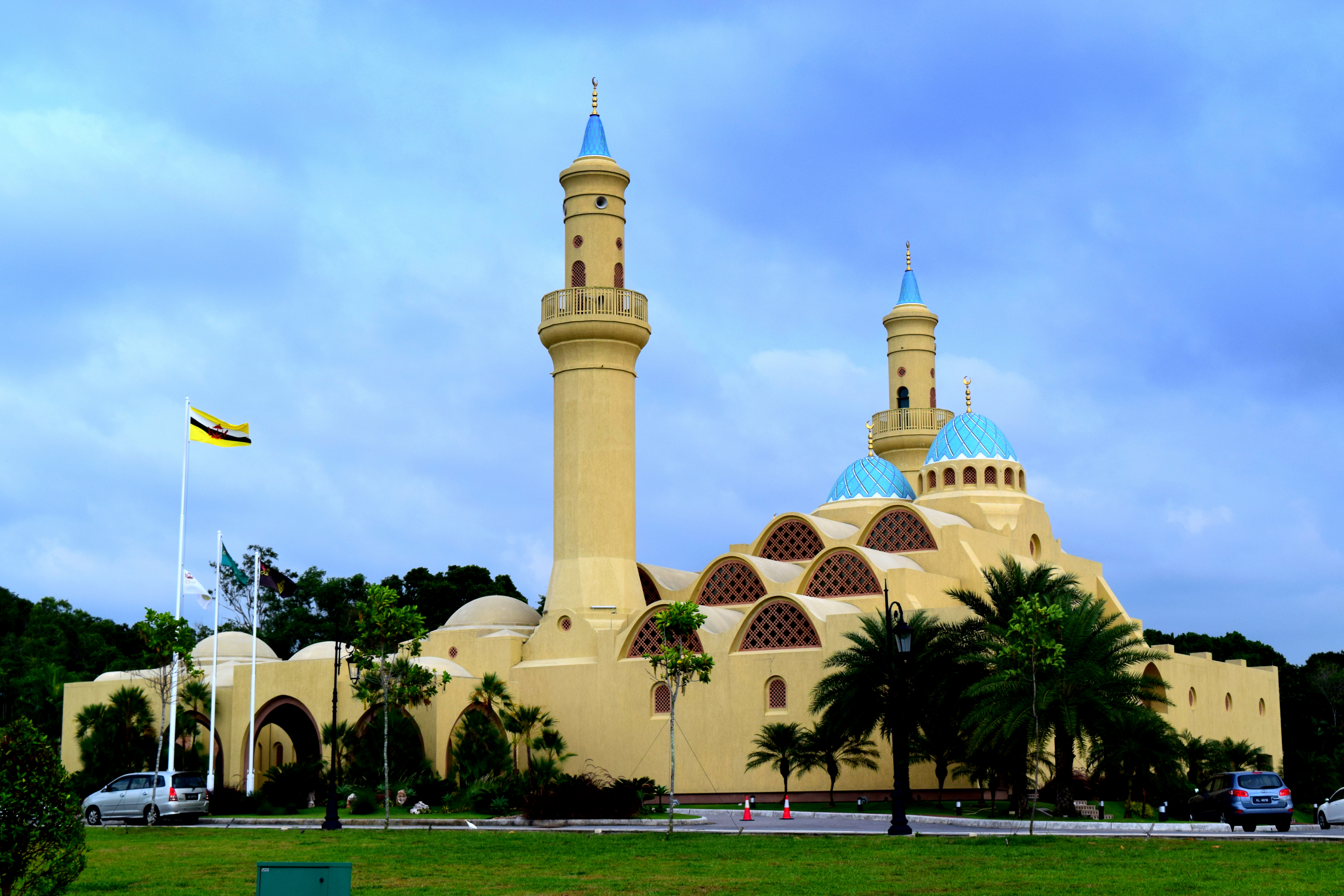
Ash-Shaliheen Mosque in Bandar Seri Begawan, Brunei (2014)

He designed several mosques outside Saudi Arabia:

- The Kerk Street Mosque, built in downtown Johannesburg, South Africa, replaced the 150-year-old mosque to accommodate a larger number of worshipers. The restricted site imposed five prayer levels and an unsparingly efficient use of space.
- The Yateem Mosque in Bahrain was designed on a challenging narrow plot. The minaret is unique as it incorporates a custom-designed clock.
- The Houghton Mosque and community centre on the outskirts of Johannesburg, South Africa.
- The Ash-Shaliheen Mosque, a mosque in Brunei designed to consider the traditional spatial character of Malay architecture.
- A Muslim Community Centre in Miami, Florida: the design of which went no further than its conceptual stage.

Taken as a body of work, the mosques of El-Wakil can now be seen to show great leaps of the imagination, while invariably being rooted in tradition. Not only are the fine ornamental details remarkable, the vast variety of columns and stalactites, pendentives and multiple other elements all created without repetition. The structural forms, such as the triangular minaret at Miqat in Madinah, grow organically from functional and programmatic exigencies.

=== Other buildings ===
Apart from mosques and houses, El-Wakil has designed and built a variety of building types:

- An early project in Jeddah was the design of a car showroom and offices, a pioneer example of the integration of Saudi Arabian elements with conventional concrete structure.
- A later project was the Souk Al-Dawoodiah at Al-Madinah Al-Munawarah; consisting of a shopping mall and office building; this also was a commercial building using traditional forms.
- A lighthouse by the coast in Jeddah, inspired by medieval Islamic towers, was of interesting design although never built.
- Two public buildings designed but not built were the Ministry of Pilgrimage and Endowment Head office in Jeddah and the offices of Public Waterworks.

== International works ==
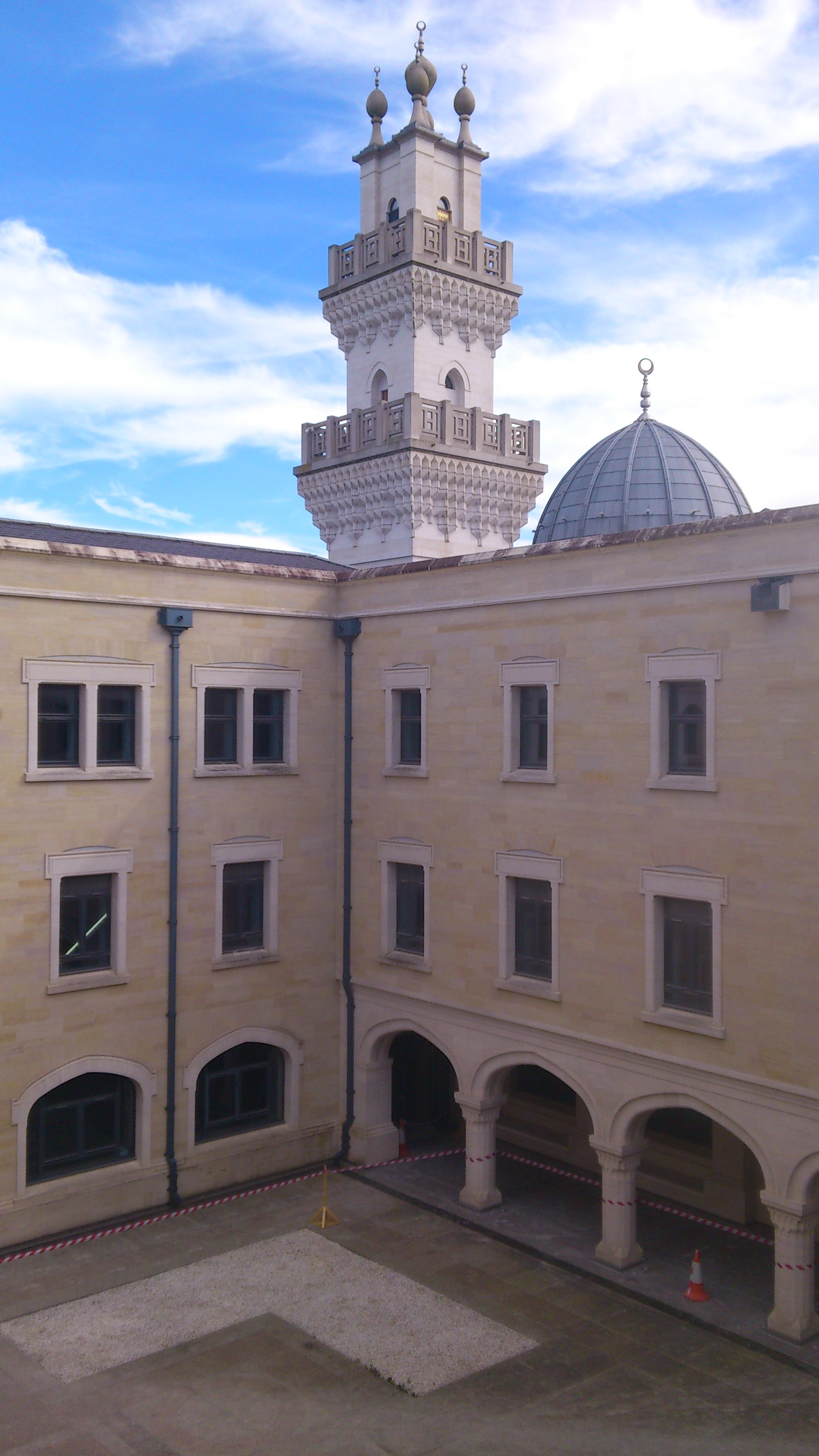
Oxford Centre for Islamic Studies in Oxford, England (2012)

In 1991, the crisis of the Gulf War forced the closure of El-Wakil's offices in the U.K. Being aware of the situation, Andrés Duany invited El-Wakil to come to Miami as visiting professor at the University of Miami. El-Wakil also joined a charette organised by Duany for the development of South Beach.

The developer Thomas Kramer, impressed by El-Wakil, asked him to design his new residence on Star Island, a neighborhood in Miami Beach. Duany presented El-Wakil with several consultancy opportunities of which The Kemer County Development offered him the opportunity to experiment with traditional Turkish architecture in the design of the country club. El-Wakil kept a base in Miami until the tragic events of September 11 attacks in the U.S.

El-Wakil has been championed by the former Prince of Wales, now King Charles III who shares his approach to architecture. The then-prince selected him among his advisors for the Prince of Wales School of Architecture, and as patron to the Oxford Centre for Islamic Studies (OXCIS); the prince commended him for the design of the centre's building. El-Wakil cherishes this recognition as he personally believes King Charles to be the true patron of tradition.

The OXCIS went through a long and sometimes painful process but has recently neared completion. The building blended the tradition of Oxford architecture with the spirit of traditional Islamic architecture. The medieval character of both architectures made it a happy marriage. The building reintroduced load-bearing brick structures, eliminating steel and concrete.

The almost-completed centre appeared on the front cover of the U.K. Financial Times magazine section on 10/11 March 2007.

== Awards ==
El-Wakil has received recognition for his contributions to traditional architecture and sustainable building technology for the third world, addressing at an early date the now-more-widely understood issues of sustainability.

- 1980 – the Agamy Beach house claimed the first Aga Khan Award for Architecture; shared the award with his mason, Ala-el-Din Moustafa, who was one of the master masons to build Hassan Fathy's village in Gourna.
- 1985 – received the King Fahd Award for Research in Islamic Architecture.
- 1986 – work was recognized by the American Institute of Architects and was made Honorary Fellow at San Antonio in Texas.
- 1987 – on the occasion of The International Year of Shelter for the Homeless (IYSH), a competition was organised for New Technological Solutions for Social Housing (CINTUS). Out of entries from 75 nations, El-Wakil's design won him an award.
- 1988 – accorded the title of professor by the International Academy of Architecture and the International Union of Architects.
- 1989 – acquired a second Aga Khan Award for the design of the Corniche Mosque in Jeddah. The Award Ceremony was held in Cairo, El-Wakil's hometown and was presented to him by the First Lady Suzanne Mubarak.
- 1993 – received a Certificate of Appreciation from Dade County, Florida, for his entry, within a charette of 20 architectural firms organised by Andres Duany, for the urban design development for South Beach, Miami.
- 1994 – received an Award and Trophy for his achievements within the city Al-Madinah Munawarah, an achievement unique for a non-Saudi.
- 1994 – received a Certificate of Appreciation from Solidere in Beirut, Lebanon, for his contribution as president of the jury for the reconstruction of the Beirut Souks.
- 1999 – honoured in Riyadh at the International Congress for Mosque Architecture with the First Prize for the Design of the Contemporary Mosque Architecture.
- 2008 – named the 2009 winner of the Richard H. Driehaus Prize for his contributions to classical architecture.
- 2024 – winner of the Arthur Ross Award for Excellence in the Classical Tradition

== Memberships ==
El-Wakil has also participated as a member of several juries on architecture and advisor to several institutions. He has been:

- A Member of the Board of Trustees of the International Heritage Trust (founded by Lord Duncan Sands);
- A Member of the Academic Board of the Prince of Wales school of Architecture;
- Advisor to Astronaut Prince Sultan bin Salman bin Abdulaziz Al Saud High Commissioner of Tourism and of Saudi Heritage Trust;
- President of the Jury for the reconstruction of the Old Souks of Beirut;
- A member of the Jury and Think tank for the Aga Khan Prize for architecture;
- Advisor to UNESCO for the development of a village to relocate the Bedul tribe in Petra, Jordan;
- A member of the King Fahd award for the International Youth of the World Competition for Islamic Architecture;
- A Member of the Jury for the competition of the urban development for Samarkhand historical centre;

El- Wakil has also participated in many International symposiums and lectures; in the US at Pratt Institute and the Museum of Modern Art in New York, the Rowlett Lectures at Texas A&M University, and the University of Texas at Austin.

== Recent activities ==
El Wakil continues in vigorous professional activity, dividing his time between Middle Eastern capitals.

In Beirut, Lebanon, he has designed three projects including the Ministry of Foreign Affairs on a prominent downtown site within the Solidere master plan; a town house re-interpreting traditional Levantine architecture to accommodate contemporary usage; and the Bank of Kuwait in the downtown Solidere district.

In Qatar he is undertaking the Master Planning of a city quarter, integrating low-energy planning practice with climate-tempered Islamic built form.

El Wakil has designed a boutique hotel in El-Gouna, Red Sea, Egypt, and a mixed-use residential quarter within the Solidere International project Cairo Eastown.

He is also doing small town houses, and a new mosque, in Riyadh.

With Prince Sultan, the Saudi astronaut, he worked on developing and restoring the old Al-'Udhaibat traditional farm in the Wadi Hanifa in Diriyah on the western outskirts of Riyadh. A book ‘Back to Earth’ recorded the project.

On a recent visit with the President of Senegal, El-Wakil was invited to develop experimental social housing in mud brick.

He has also been involved in the design development of a compressed-earth brick making machine in South Africa with the development of interlocking brick shapes.

El Wakil retains his aim of designing, in homage to Fathy, a sustainable village retaining the culture and forms of tradition. He avows that green architecture need not look industrial.

== See also ==
- List of Egyptian architects
