= Agami =

Agami العجمي
- District
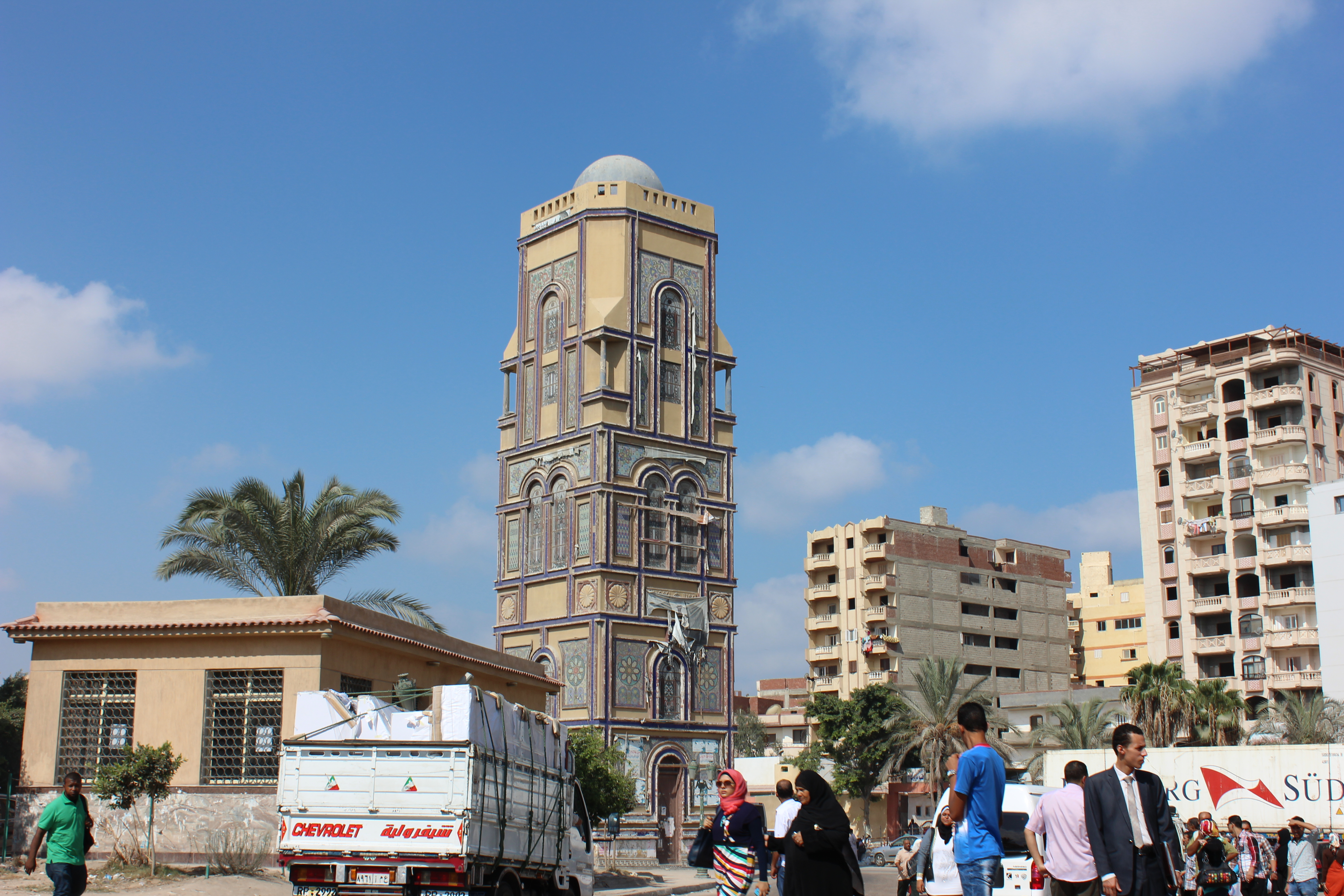
- The clock tower at the entrance to El-Agamy, Alexandria, Egypt

- Location in Egypt
- Coordinates: 31.095866°N 29.760389°E
- Country: Egypt
- Governorate: Alexandria

Population
  - Estimate (2016): 300,000
- Time zone: UTC+2 (EET)
  - Summer (DST): UTC+3 (EEST)

Agami (Arabic: العجمي, romanized: el-ʿAgami, commonly shortened to عجمي [ˈʕæɡæmi]; full name عجمي البيطاش [elˈʕæɡæmi l.biˈtˤɑːʃ]) is a city and administrative district (hayy) the Alexandria Governorate of Egypt. Twenty kilometres (12 mi) west of Alexandria, the town is a popular destination for both local Alexandrines and tourists from Greater Cairo.

== Overview ==
The city was first established as a compound for the elite class of Egypt in the 1950s. Nowadays, the city is a popular local tourist destination for middle-class Egyptians, famous for its turquoise waters. The city also has a number of monuments, including a French fort built during the French campaign in Egypt under Napoleon Bonaparte, and also has several watch towers built during the Ottoman era.

The city was also a famous hunting spot in the early 1940s for hunting turtles, doves, and quails.

== Geography ==
=== Location ===
The city has flourished mainly for its relatively small distance from central Alexandria and its favourable location on the intersection of the Cairo-Alexandria Desert Road and the North Coast road, which has made it a preferred spot for vacationers in Egypt.

=== Neighborhoods ===
- Abu Yusuf
- El Max
- Nakheel
- El Bitash
- Hanoville
- Dekhela
- Sidi Kreir

=== Climate ===
Köppen-Geiger climate classification system classifies its climate as hot desert (BWh), but prevailing Mediterranean Sea winds highly moderate the temperatures, which is similar to the rest of the northern coast of Egypt. Its climate is very similar to Alexandria, but Alexandria is wetter.

Climate data for Agami
Month	Jan	Feb	Mar	Apr	May	Jun	Jul	Aug	Sep	Oct	Nov	Dec	Year
Mean daily maximum °C (°F)	18 (64)	18.5 (65.3)	20.5 (68.9)	23.7 (74.7)	26.2 (79.2)	29.7 (85.5)	29.5 (85.1)	30.7 (87.3)	29.5 (85.1)	28.2 (82.8)	24.5 (76.1)	20.2 (68.4)	24.9 (76.9)
Daily mean °C (°F)	13.7 (56.7)	14.2 (57.6)	15.9 (60.6)	18.5 (65.3)	21.4 (70.5)	25.3 (77.5)	25.7 (78.3)	26.5 (79.7)	25.5 (77.9)	23.3 (73.9)	19.8 (67.6)	15.7 (60.3)	20.5 (68.8)
Mean daily minimum °C (°F)	9.4 (48.9)	10 (50)	11.3 (52.3)	13.3 (55.9)	16.6 (61.9)	20.9 (69.6)	21.9 (71.4)	22.3 (72.1)	21.5 (70.7)	18.5 (65.3)	15.2 (59.4)	11.3 (52.3)	16.0 (60.8)
Average precipitation mm (inches)	43 (1.7)	30 (1.2)	9 (0.4)	4 (0.2)	1 (0.0)	0 (0)	0 (0)	0 (0)	0 (0)	5 (0.2)	26 (1.0)	44 (1.7)	162 (6.4)
Source: Climate-Data.org
